= 1961 in the United States =

- Decades: 1940s; 1950s; 1960s; 1970s; 1980s
- See also: History of the United States (1945–1964); Timeline of United States history (1950–1969); List of years in the United States

Events from the year 1961 in the United States.

== Incumbents ==
=== Federal government ===
- President:

Dwight D. Eisenhower (R-Kansas/Pennsylvania) (until January 20)
John F. Kennedy (D-Massachusetts) (starting January 20)

- Vice President:

Richard Nixon (R-California) (until January 20)
Lyndon B. Johnson (D-Texas) (starting January 20)

- Chief Justice: Earl Warren (California)
- Speaker of the House of Representatives:

Sam Rayburn (D-Texas) (until November 16)
vacant (starting November 16)

- Senate Majority Leader:

Lyndon B. Johnson (D-Texas) (until January 3)
Mike Mansfield (D-Montana) (starting January 3)

- Congress: 86th (until January 3), 87th (starting January 3)

==== State governments ====
Governors and lieutenant governors

=== Governors ===
- Governor of Alabama: John M. Patterson (Democratic)
- Governor of Alaska: William A. Egan (Democratic)
- Governor of Arizona: Paul Fannin (Republican)
- Governor of Arkansas: Orval Faubus (Democratic)
- Governor of California: Pat Brown (Democratic)
- Governor of Colorado: Stephen L. R. McNichols (Democratic)
- Governor of Connecticut: Abraham A. Ribicoff (Democratic) (until January 21), John N. Dempsey (Democratic) (starting January 21)
- Governor of Delaware: David P. Buckson (Republican) (until January 17), Elbert N. Carvel (Democratic) (starting January 17)
- Governor of Florida: LeRoy Collins (Democratic) (until January 3), C. Farris Bryant (Democratic) (starting January 3)
- Governor of Georgia: Ernest Vandiver (Democratic)
- Governor of Hawaii: William F. Quinn (Republican)
- Governor of Idaho: Robert E. Smylie (Republican)
- Governor of Illinois: William G. Stratton (Republican) (until January 9), Otto Kerner, Jr. (Democratic) (starting January 9)
- Governor of Indiana: Harold W. Handley (Republican) (until January 9), Matthew E. Welsh (Democratic) (starting January 9)
- Governor of Iowa: Herschel C. Loveless (Democratic) (until January 12), Norman A. Erbe (Republican) (starting January 12)
- Governor of Kansas: George Docking (Democratic) (until January 9), John Anderson, Jr. (Republican) (starting January 9)
- Governor of Kentucky: Bert T. Combs (Democratic)
- Governor of Louisiana: Jimmie H. Davis (Democratic)
- Governor of Maine: John H. Reed (Republican)
- Governor of Maryland: J. Millard Tawes (Democratic)
- Governor of Massachusetts: Foster Furcolo (Democratic) (until January 5), John A. Volpe (Republican) (starting January 5)
- Governor of Michigan: G. Mennen Williams (Democratic) (until January 1), John Swainson (Democratic) (starting January 1)
- Governor of Minnesota: Orville L. Freeman (Democratic) (until January 2), Elmer L. Andersen (Republican) (starting January 2)
- Governor of Mississippi: Ross R. Barnett (Democratic)
- Governor of Missouri: James T. Blair, Jr. (Democratic) (until January 9), John M. Dalton (Democratic) (starting January 9)
- Governor of Montana: J. Hugo Aronson (Republican) (until January 2), Donald Grant Nutter (Republican) (starting January 2)
- Governor of Nebraska: Dwight Burney (Republican) (until January 5), Frank B. Morrison (Democratic) (starting January 5)
- Governor of Nevada: Grant Sawyer (Democratic)
- Governor of New Hampshire: Wesley Powell (Republican)
- Governor of New Jersey: Robert B. Meyner (Democratic)
- Governor of New Mexico: John Burroughs (Democratic) (until January 1), Edwin L. Mechem (Republican) (starting January 1)
- Governor of New York: Nelson Rockefeller (Republican)
- Governor of North Carolina: Luther H. Hodges (Democratic) (until January 5), Terry Sanford (Democratic) (starting January 5)
- Governor of North Dakota: John E. Davis (Republican) (until January 4), William L. Guy (Democratic) (starting January 4)
- Governor of Ohio: Michael DiSalle (Democratic)
- Governor of Oklahoma: J. Howard Edmondson (Democratic)
- Governor of Oregon: Mark Hatfield (Republican)
- Governor of Pennsylvania: David L. Lawrence (Democratic)
- Governor of Rhode Island: Christopher Del Sesto (Republican) (until January 3), John A. Notte, Jr. (Democratic) (starting January 3)
- Governor of South Carolina: Ernest Hollings (Democratic)
- Governor of South Dakota: Ralph Herseth (Democratic) (until January 3), Archie M. Gubbrud (Republican) (starting January 3)
- Governor of Tennessee: Buford Ellington (Democratic)
- Governor of Texas: Price Daniel (Democratic)
- Governor of Utah: George Dewey Clyde (Republican)
- Governor of Vermont: Robert T. Stafford (Republican) (until January 5), F. Ray Keyser, Jr. (Republican) (starting January 5)
- Governor of Virginia: J. Lindsay Almond (Democratic)
- Governor of Washington: Albert D. Rosellini (Democratic)
- Governor of West Virginia: Cecil H. Underwood (Republican) (until January 16), William Wallace Barron (Democratic) (starting January 16)
- Governor of Wisconsin: Gaylord A. Nelson (Democratic)
- Governor of Wyoming: John J. Hickey (Democratic) (until January 2), Jack R. Gage (Democratic) (starting January 2)

=== Lieutenant governors ===
- Lieutenant Governor of Alabama: Albert B. Boutwell (Democratic)
- Lieutenant Governor of Alaska: Hugh Wade (Democratic)
- Lieutenant Governor of Arkansas: Nathan Green Gordon (Democratic)
- Lieutenant Governor of California: Glenn Malcolm Anderson (Democratic)
- Lieutenant Governor of Colorado: Robert Lee Knous (Democratic)
- Lieutenant Governor of Connecticut: John N. Dempsey (Democratic) (until January 21), Anthony J. Armentano (Democratic) (starting January 21)
- Lieutenant Governor of Delaware: vacant (until January 17), Eugene Lammot (Democratic) (starting January 17)
- Lieutenant Governor of Georgia: Garland T. Byrd (Democratic)
- Lieutenant Governor of Hawaii: James Kealoha (Republican)
- Lieutenant Governor of Idaho: William Drevlow (Democratic)
- Lieutenant Governor of Illinois: John William Chapman (Republican) (until January 9), Samuel H. Shapiro (Democratic) (starting January 9)
- Lieutenant Governor of Indiana: Crawford F. Parker (Republican) (until January 9), Richard O. Ristine (Republican) (starting January 9)
- Lieutenant Governor of Iowa: Edward J. McManus (Democratic) (until January 12), W. L. Mooty (Democratic) (starting January 12)
- Lieutenant Governor of Kansas: Joseph W. Henkle, Sr. (Democratic) (until January 9), Harold H. Chase (Republican) (starting January 9)
- Lieutenant Governor of Kentucky: Wilson W. Wyatt (Democratic)
- Lieutenant Governor of Louisiana: C. C. Aycock (Democratic)
- Lieutenant Governor of Massachusetts: vacant (until January 5), Edward F. McLaughlin, Jr. (Democratic) (starting January 5)
- Lieutenant Governor of Michigan: John B. Swainson (Democratic) (until January 1), T. John Lesinski (Democratic) (starting January 1)
- Lieutenant Governor of Minnesota: Karl Rolvaag (Democratic)
- Lieutenant Governor of Mississippi: Paul B. Johnson, Jr. (Democratic)
- Lieutenant Governor of Missouri: vacant (until January 9), Hilary A. Bush (Democratic) (starting January 9)
- Lieutenant Governor of Montana: Paul Cannon (Democratic) (until January 2), Tim M. Babcock (Republican) (starting January 2)
- Lieutenant Governor of Nebraska: Dwight Burney (Republican)
- Lieutenant Governor of Nevada: Rex Bell (Republican)
- Lieutenant Governor of New Mexico: Ed V. Mead (Democratic) (until January 1), Tom Bolack (Republican) (starting January 1)
- Lieutenant Governor of New York: Malcolm Wilson (Republican)
- Lieutenant Governor of North Carolina:
  - until January 5: Luther E. Barnhardt (Democratic)
  - January 5-August 19: Harvey Cloyd Philpott (Democratic)
  - starting August 19: vacant
- Lieutenant Governor of North Dakota: Clarence P. Dahl (Republican) (until January 4), Orville W. Hagen (Republican) (starting January 4)
- Lieutenant Governor of Ohio: John W. Donahey (Democratic)
- Lieutenant Governor of Oklahoma: George Nigh (Democratic)
- Lieutenant Governor of Pennsylvania: John Morgan Davis (Democratic)
- Lieutenant Governor of Rhode Island: John A. Notte, Jr. (Democratic) (until January 3), Edward P. Gallogly (Democratic) (starting January 3)
- Lieutenant Governor of South Carolina: Burnet R. Maybank, Jr. (Democratic)
- Lieutenant Governor of South Dakota: John F. Lindley (Democratic) (until January 3), Joseph H. Bottum (Republican) (starting January 3)
- Lieutenant Governor of Tennessee: William D. Baird (Democratic)
- Lieutenant Governor of Texas: Ben Ramsey (Democratic) (until September 18), vacant (starting September 18)
- Lieutenant Governor of Vermont: Robert S. Babcock (Republican) (until January 5), Ralph A. Foote (Republican) (starting January 5)
- Lieutenant Governor of Virginia: Allie Edward Stokes Stephens (Democratic)
- Lieutenant Governor of Washington: John Cherberg (Democratic)
- Lieutenant Governor of Wisconsin: Philleo Nash (Democratic) (until January 2), Warren P. Knowles (Republican) (starting January 2)

== Events ==
=== January–March ===
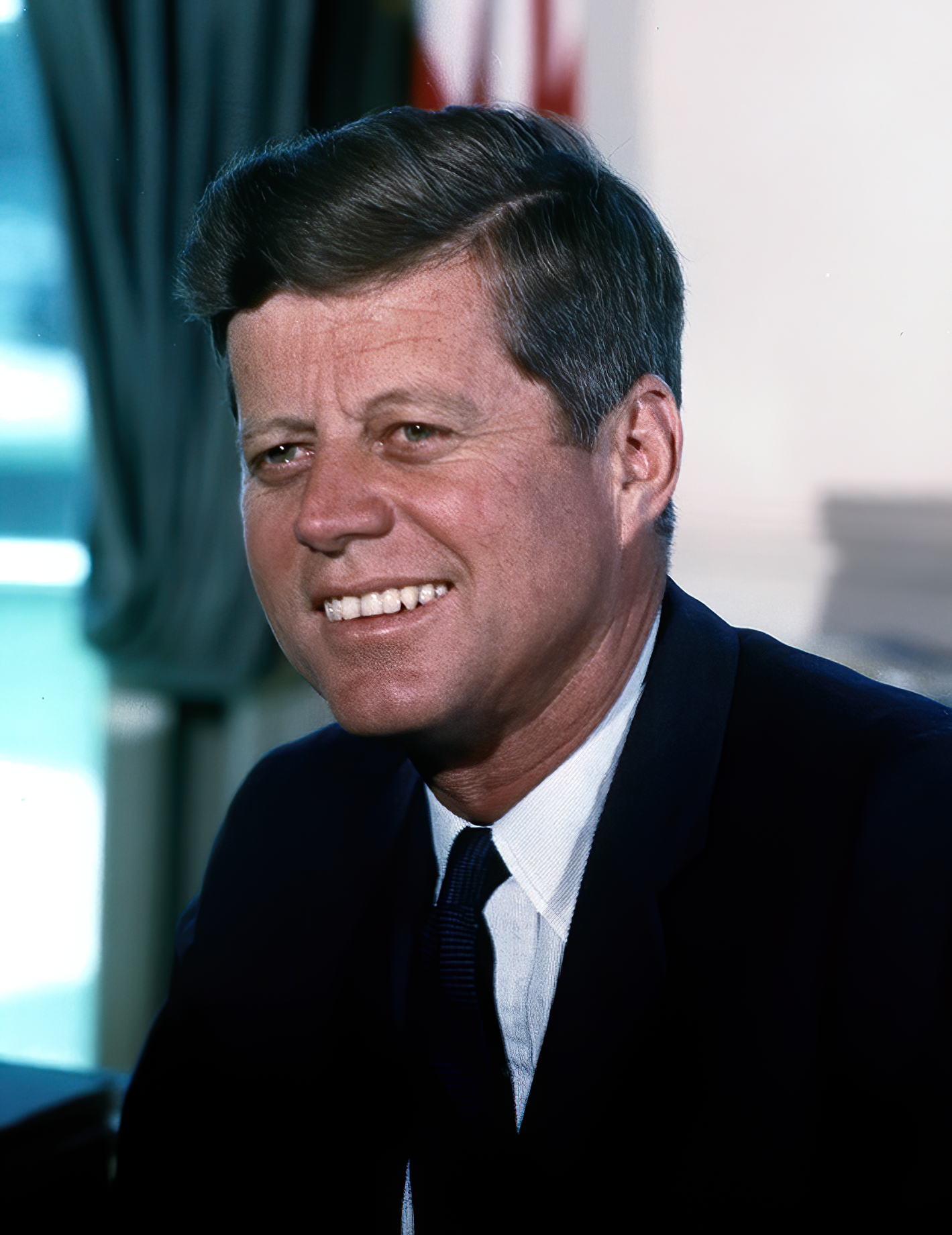
January 20: John F. Kennedy becomes the 35th U.S. president

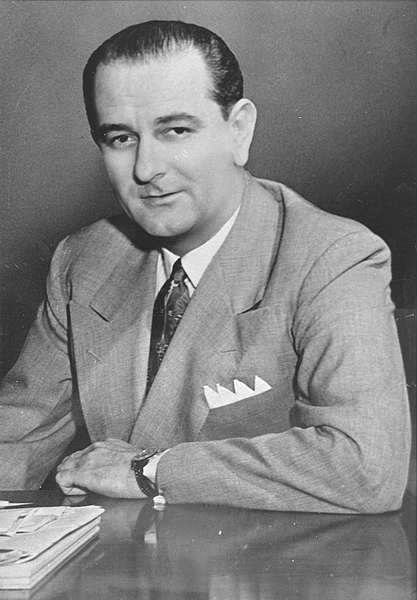
Lyndon B. Johnson becomes the 37th U.S. vice president

- January 3
  - President Dwight Eisenhower announces that the United States has severed diplomatic and consular relations with Cuba.
  - At the National Reactor Testing Station near Idaho Falls, Idaho, atomic reactor SL-1 explodes, killing 3 military technicians.
- January 5 – Italian sculptor Alfredo Fioravanti marches into the U.S. Consulate in Rome, and confesses that he was part of the team that forged the Etruscan terracotta warriors in the Metropolitan Museum of Art.
- January 17 – President Dwight Eisenhower gives his Farewell Address, during which he warns of the increasing power of a "military-industrial complex".
- January 20 – John F. Kennedy is sworn in as the 35th president of the United States, and Lyndon B. Johnson is sworn in as the 37th vice president.
- January 24
  - A U.S. B-52 Stratofortress, with two Mark 39 nuclear bombs, crashes near Goldsboro, North Carolina.
  - Musician Bob Dylan reportedly makes his way to New York City after bumming a ride in Madison, Wisconsin. Dylan is likely on his way to visit his idol Woody Guthrie. He later finds fame in the Greenwich Village protest folk music scene.
- January 25
  - In Washington, D.C. John F. Kennedy delivers the first live presidential news conference. In it, he announces that the Soviet Union has freed the 2 surviving crewmen of a USAF RB-47 reconnaissance plane shot down by Soviet flyers over the Barents Sea July 1, 1960 (see 1960 RB-47 shootdown incident).
  - Disney's animated film, One Hundred and One Dalmatians, is released. Its financial success pulling the studio out of another financial slump from the initial underperformance of Sleeping Beauty.
- January 26 – John F. Kennedy appoints Janet G. Travell to be his physician, the first woman to hold this appointment.
- January 30 – President John F. Kennedy delivers his first State of the Union Address.
- January 31 – Ham, a 37-pound (17-kg) male chimpanzee, is rocketed into space aboard Mercury-Redstone 2, in a test of the Project Mercury capsule, designed to carry United States astronauts into space.
- February 1 – The United States launches its first test of the Minuteman I intercontinental ballistic missile.
- February 14 – Discovery of the chemical elements: Element 103, Lawrencium, is first synthesized in Berkeley, California.
- February 15
  - President Kennedy warns the Soviet Union to avoid interfering with the United Nations pacification of the Congo.
  - A Sabena Boeing 707 crashes near Brussels, Belgium, killing 73, including the entire United States figure skating team and several coaches (Sabena Flight 548).
- March 1 – President of the United States John F. Kennedy establishes the Peace Corps.
- March 8 – The first U.S. Polaris submarines arrive at Holy Loch in Scotland.
- March 11 – "Barbie" gets a boyfriend, when the "Ken" doll is introduced in the United States.
- March 13
  - United States delegate to the United Nations Security Council Adlai Stevenson votes against Portuguese policies in Africa (Portuguese Colonial War)
  - President of the United States John F. Kennedy proposes a long-term Alliance for Progress between the United States and Latin America.
- March 29 – The Twenty-third Amendment to the United States Constitution is ratified, allowing residents of Washington, D.C. to vote in presidential elections.
- March 30 – The Single Convention on Narcotic Drugs is signed at New York City.

=== April–June ===
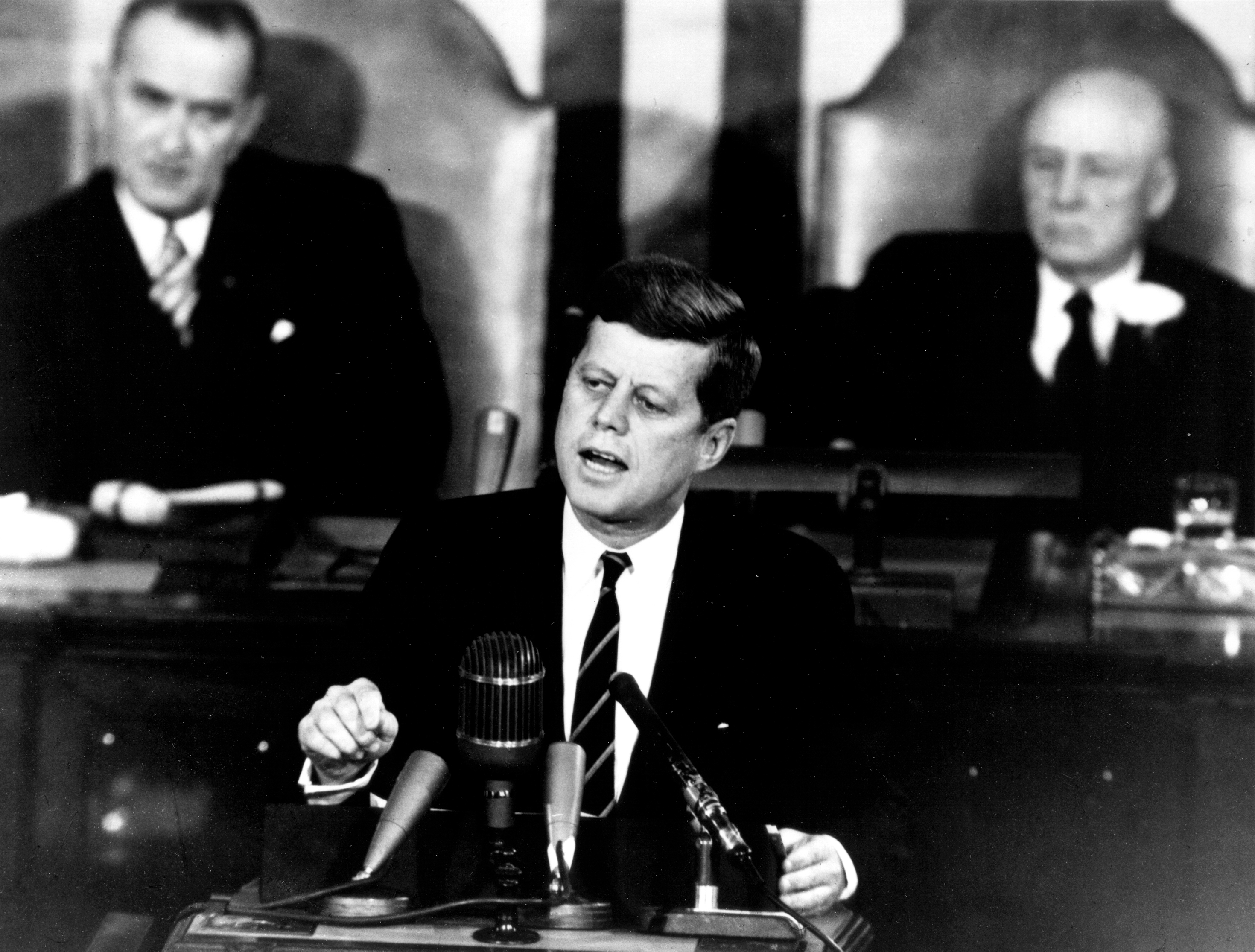
President Kennedy delivers his proposal to put a man on the Moon before a joint session of Congress, May 25, 1961

"I believe that this nation should commit itself to achieving the goal, before this decade is out, of landing a man on the Moon and returning him safely to the Earth."

— President John F. Kennedy before a joint session of Congress, May 25, 1961
- April 17
  - The Bay of Pigs Invasion of Cuba begins; it fails by April 19.
  - The 33rd Academy Awards ceremony, hosted by Bob Hope, is held at Santa Monica Civic Auditorium. Billy Wilder's The Apartment wins and receives the most respective awards and nominations with five and ten, winning Best Motion Picture and Best Director for Wilder. It is the last black-and-white film to win for Best Picture until 1993.
- 19 April – President Kennedy presented the National Geographic Society's Gold Medal, in the White House Rose Garden, to Jacques Cousteau, the inventor of the Aqua-Lung, undersea explorer, and filmmaker. The medal was inscribed: "To earthbound man he gave the key to the silent world."
- April 23 – Judy Garland performs in a legendary comeback concert at Carnegie Hall in New York City.
- April 27 – President Kennedy delivers a revealing speech: The President and the Press: Address before the American Newspaper Publishers Association.
- May 4 – U.S. Freedom Riders begin interstate bus rides to test the new U.S. Supreme Court integration decision.
- May 5 – Mercury program: Alan Shepard becomes the first American in space aboard Mercury-Redstone 3.
- May 9 – In a speech on "Television and the Public Interest" to the National Association of Broadcasters, FCC chairman Newton N. Minow describes commercial television programming as a "vast wasteland".
- May 14 – American civil rights movement: A Freedom Riders bus is fire-bombed near Anniston, Alabama and the civil rights protestors are beaten by an angry mob of Ku Klux Klan members.
- May 21 – American civil rights movement: Alabama Governor John Patterson declares martial law in an attempt to restore order after race riots break out.
- May 24 – American civil rights movement: Freedom Riders are arrested in Jackson, Mississippi for "disturbing the peace" after disembarking from their bus.
- May 25 – Apollo program: President Kennedy announces before a special joint session of Congress his goal to put a man on the Moon before the end of the decade.
- May 31 – President John F. Kennedy and French President Charles De Gaulle meet in Paris, France.
- June 4 – Vienna summit: John F. Kennedy and Nikita Khrushchev meet during two days in Vienna. They discuss nuclear tests, disarmament and Germany.

=== July–September ===
- July 21 – Mercury program: Gus Grissom, piloting the Mercury-Redstone 4 capsule Liberty Bell 7, becomes the second American to go into space (sub-orbital). Upon splashdown, the hatch prematurely opens, and the capsule sinks (it is recovered in 1999).
- July 31 – At Fenway Park in Boston, Massachusetts, the first All-Star Game tie in major league baseball history occurs, when the game is stopped in the 9th inning due to rain (the only tie until 2002 in MLB All-Star Game history).
- August – USA founds Alliance for Progress.
- August 5 – The Six Flags over Texas theme park officially opens to the public.
- August 7 – Cape Cod National Seashore is established.
- August 18 – Mass seabird attack on Capitola, California (the result of phycotoxin intake).
- September 7 – Tom and Jerry make a return with their first episode since 1958, Switchin' Kitten.
- September 17 – The world's first retractable roof stadium, the Civic Arena, opens in Pittsburgh, Pennsylvania.
- September 24 – The Walt Disney anthology television series, renamed Walt Disney's Wonderful World of Color, moves from ABC to NBC after seven years on the air, and begins telecasting its programs in color for the first time.
- September 25 – Black voting rights activist Herbert Lee is killed by Mississippi state representative E. H. Hurst.

=== October–December ===
- October 1 – Baseball player Roger Maris of the New York Yankees hits his 61st home run in the last game of the season, against the Boston Red Sox, beating the 34-year-old record held by Babe Ruth.
- October 9 – The New York Yankees defeat the Cincinnati Reds, 4 games to 1, to win their 19th World Series Title.
- October 27 – A standoff between Soviet and American tanks in Berlin, Germany heightens Cold War tensions.
- November – The Fantastic Four #1 comic debuts, launching the Marvel Universe and revolutionizing the American comic book industry.
- November 2 – Kean opens at Broadway Theater in New York City for 92 performances.
- November 6 – The U.S. government issues a stamp honoring the one-hundredth birthday of James Naismith.
- November 9 – Robert M. White records a world record speed in a rocket plane of 6,585 km/h flying an X-15.
- November 17 – Michael Rockefeller, son of New York Governor, and later Vice President Nelson Rockefeller, disappears in the jungles of New Guinea.
- November 18 – U.S. President John F. Kennedy sends 18,000 military advisors to South Vietnam.
- November 20 – The funeral of longtime House Speaker Sam Rayburn is held in Washington, D.C. Two former presidents (Truman, Eisenhower) and one future one (Lyndon B. Johnson) join President Kennedy in paying their respects.
- December 5 – U.S. President John F. Kennedy gives support to the Volta Dam project in Ghana.
- December 11 – The Vietnam War officially begins, as the first American helicopters arrive in Saigon along with 400 U.S. personnel.

=== Ongoing ===
- Cold War (1947–1991)
- Space Race (1957–1975)
- Vietnam War (1955-1975)

== Sport ==
- April 16 - Chicago Black Hawks win their third (and last until 2010) Stanley Cup by defeating the Detroit Red Wings 4 games to 2; the deciding game is played at Olympia Stadium in Detroit.

== Births ==
=== January ===
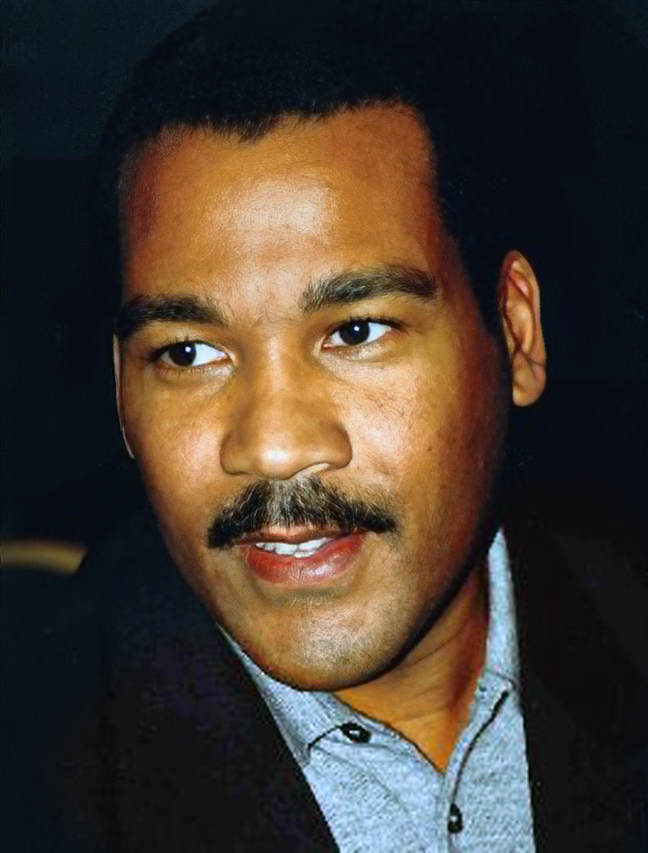
Dexter King

- January 2
  - Gabrielle Carteris, actress and trade union leader
  - Todd Haynes, director and screenwriter
- January 4
  - Lee Curreri, actor and pianist
  - Sidney Green, basketball player and coach
- January 5 – Iris DeMent, singer-songwriter
- January 7 – John Thune, U.S. Senator from South Dakota from 2005
- January 9
  - Al Jean, animator and television writer
  - Candi Milo, actress
  - Oliver Goldstick, screenwriter and producer
- January 10
  - Evan Handler, actor
  - Janet Jones, actress
- January 13
  - Wayne Coyne, musician, frontman of The Flaming Lips
  - Julia Louis-Dreyfus, actress, producer and comedian
  - Rich Fields, announcer and weather reporter
- January 15 – Leni Wylliams, dancer/choreographer/master-teacher (died 1996)
- January 18 – Bob Peterson, animator and voice actor
- January 19 – William Ragsdale, actor
- January 22
  - Quintin Dailey, basketball player (died 2010)
  - Daniel Johnston, musician (died 2019)
- January 29 – Mike Aldrete, baseball player and coach
- January 30 – Dexter King, social activist, son of Martin Luther King Jr. (died 2024)

=== February ===
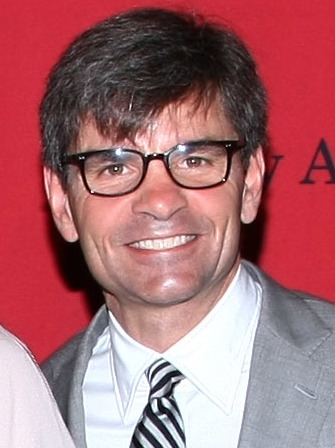
George Stephanopoulos

- February 2 – Michael Kay, sportscaster
- February 4 – Stewart O'Nan, novelist
- February 8 – Vince Neil, singer
- February 9 – John Kruk, baseball player and commentator
- February 10 – George Stephanopoulos, political consultant and commentator
- February 12 – David Graeber, anthropologist, anarchist activist and author (died 2020)
- February 17 – Chris Champion, wrestler (died 2018)

=== March ===
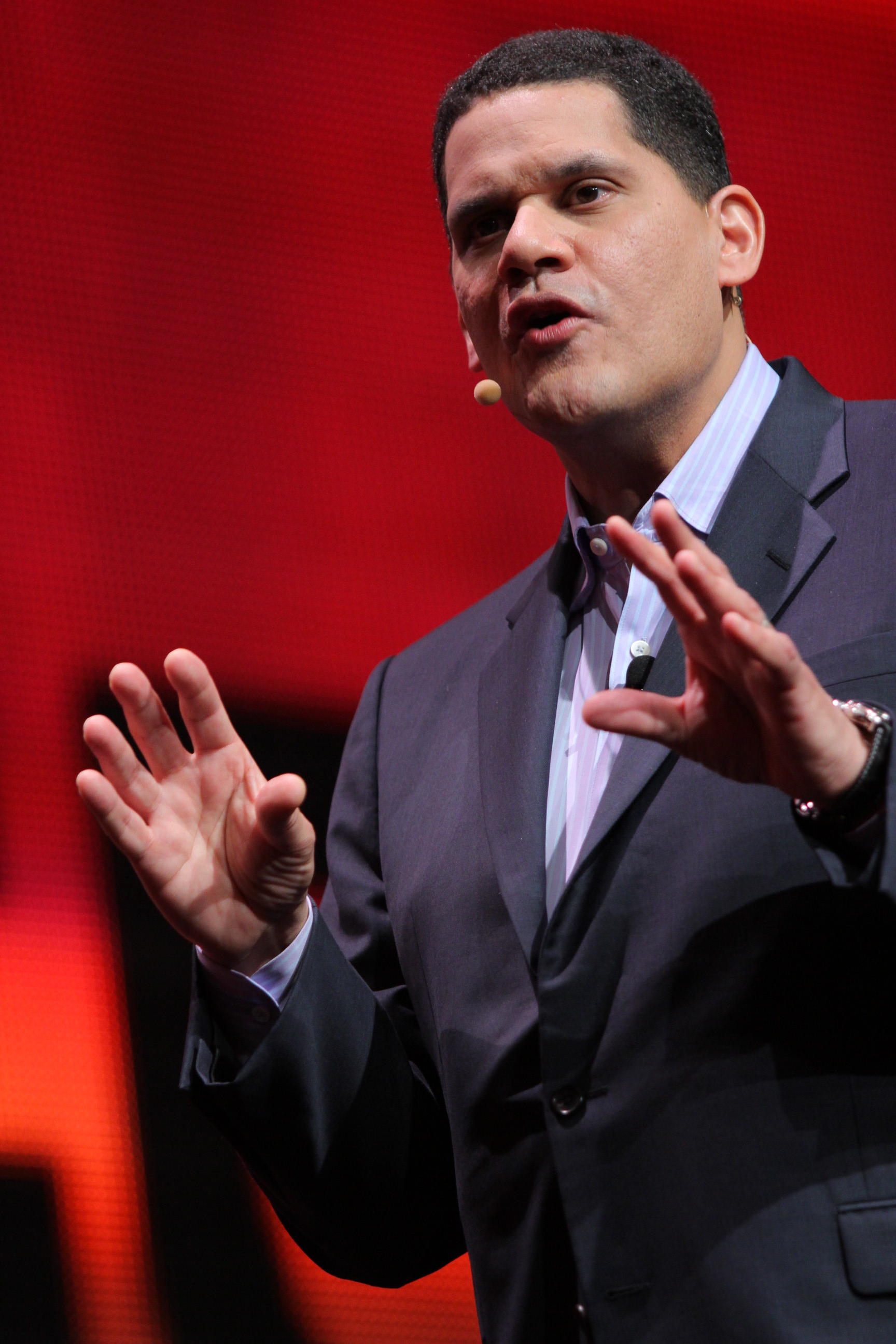
Reggie Fils-Aimé

- March 4
  - Ray Mancini, boxer
  - Steven Weber, actor, producer, and screenwriter
- March 6 – John Blake, American football coach (died 2020)
- March 14 – Gary Dell'Abate, radio producer, best known for his work on The Howard Stern Show
- March 25 – Reggie Fils-Aimé, president of Nintendo of America
- March 30 – Maria Maricich, alpine skier

=== April ===
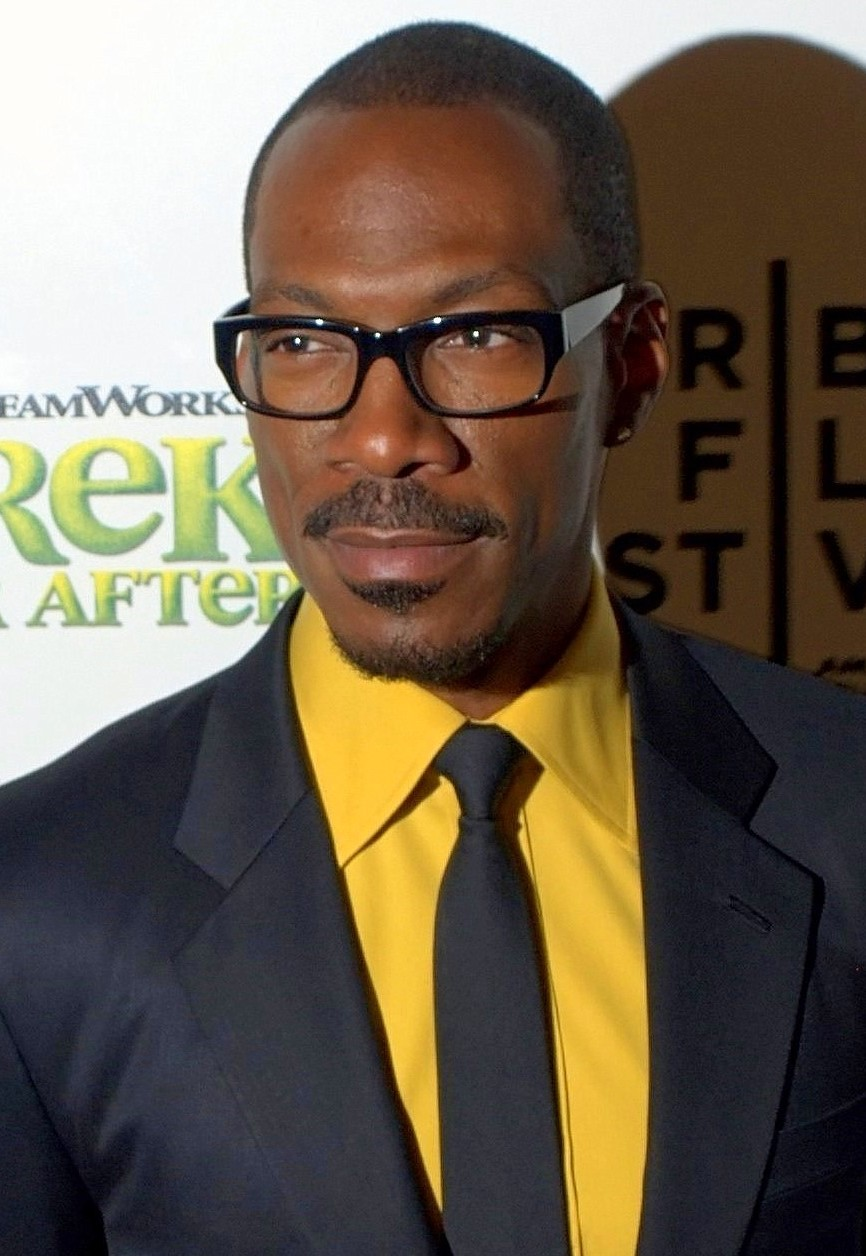
Eddie Murphy

- April 2 – Christopher Meloni, actor
- April 3 – Eddie Murphy, actor
- April 10
  - Mark Jones, basketball player
  - Quency Williams, football player (died 2022 in Canada)
- April 14 – Daniel Clowes, cartoonist and screenwriter
- April 17 – Rebecca Luker, actress and singer (died 2020)
- April 20
  - Don Mattingly, baseball player
  - Mike Pniewski, actor and public speaker
- April 26 – Chris Mars, singer-songwriter, drummer and producer

=== May ===
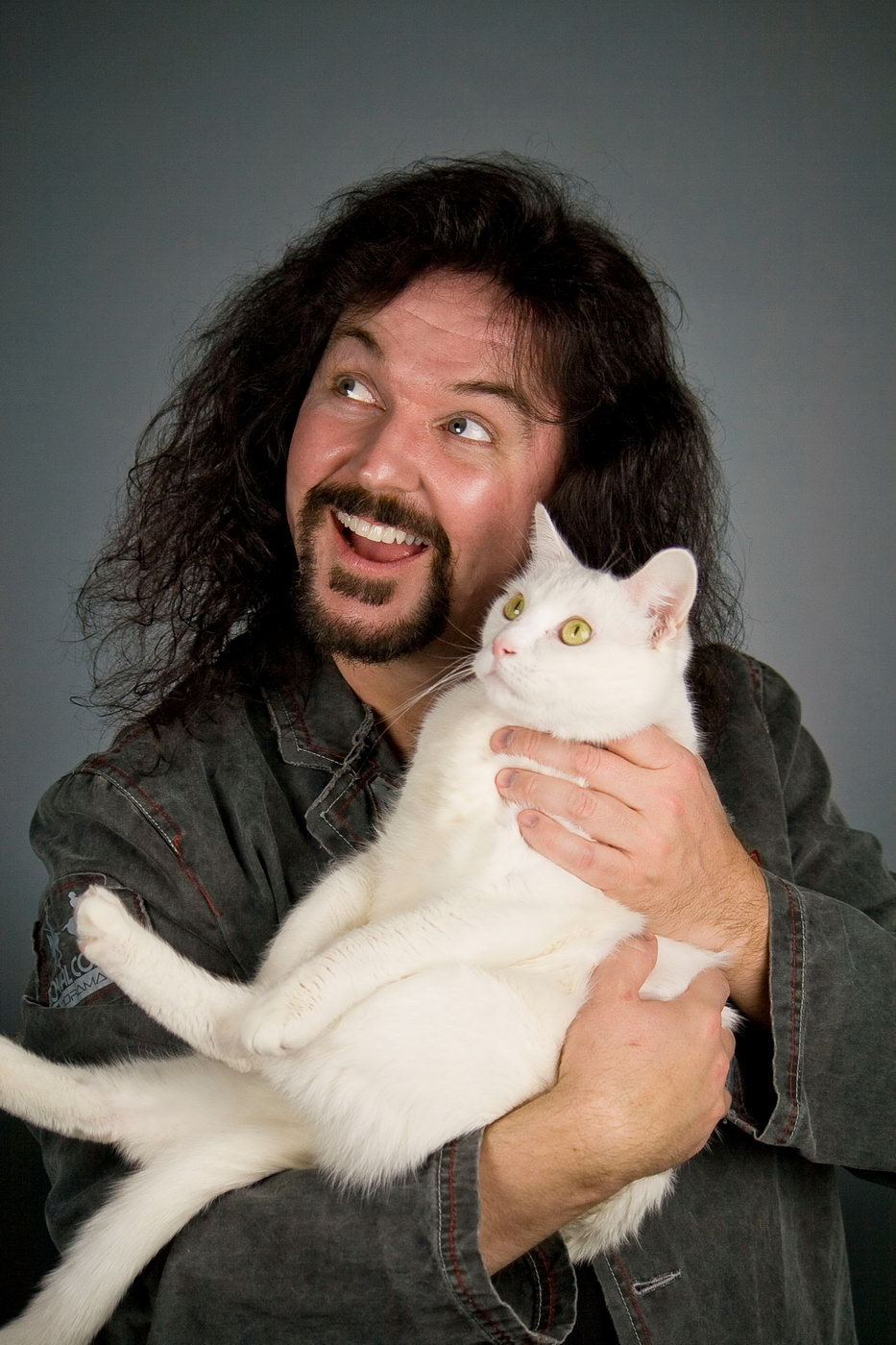
Wally Wingert

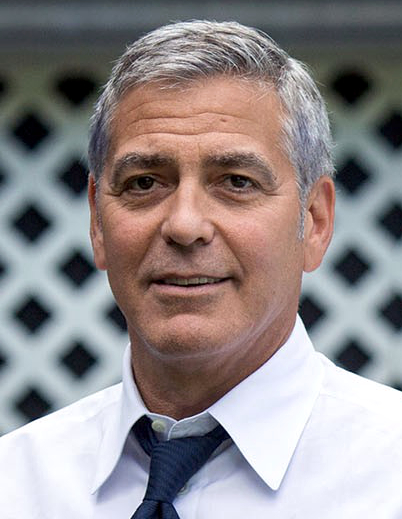
George Clooney

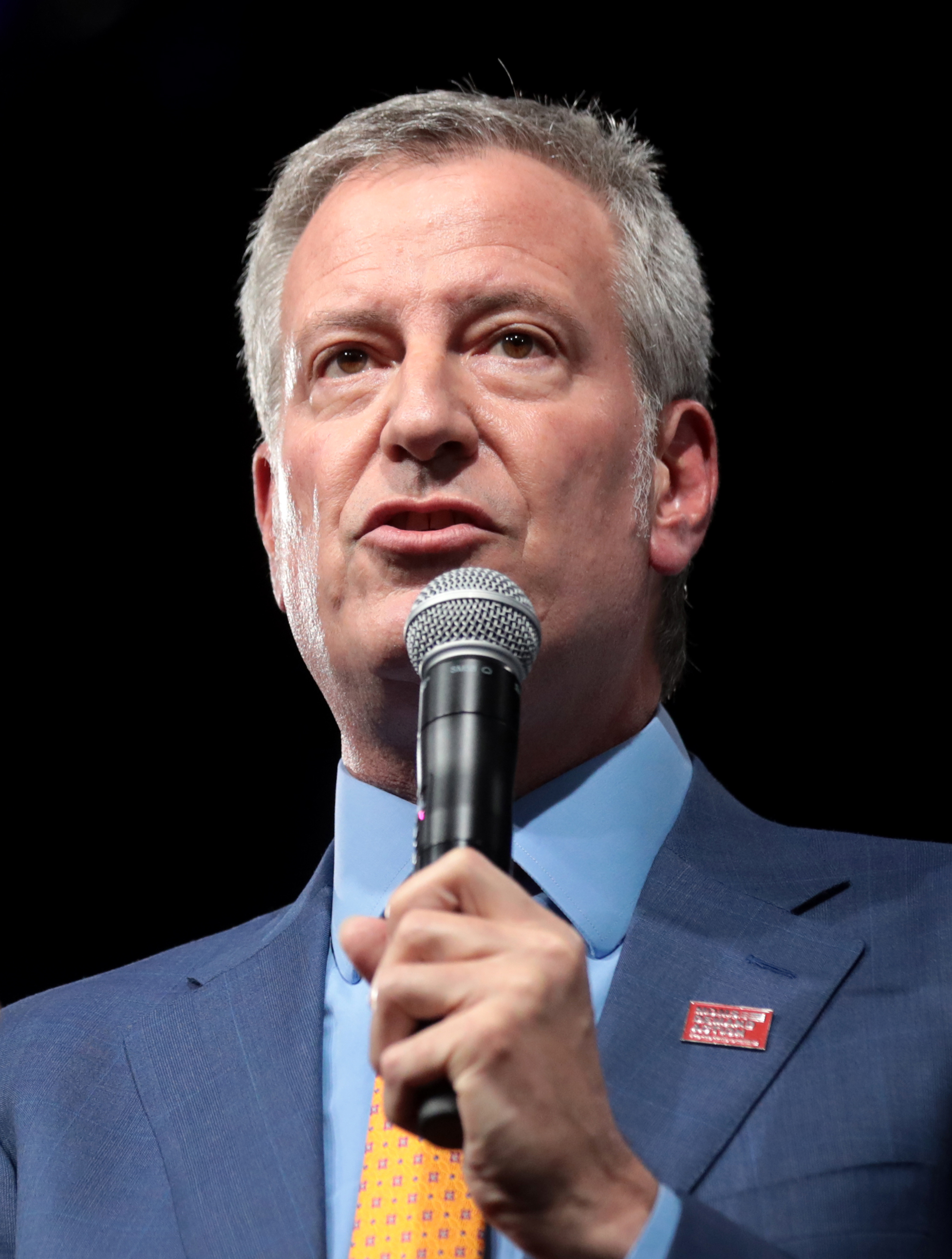
Bill de Blasio

- May 3
  - David Vitter, U.S. Senator from Louisiana from 2005 to 2017
  - Joe Murray, animator, writer, illustrator, producer, director, and voice actor
- May 6
  - George Clooney, actor, film director, producer and screenwriter
  - Wally Wingert, voice actor and radio personality
- May 7 – Robert Spano, conductor and pianist
- May 8 – Bill de Blasio, politician, Mayor of New York City from 2014
- May 11
  - Paul Begala, political commentator
  - Lar Park Lincoln, actress
- May 12
  - Paul Begala, journalist and academic
  - Lar Park Lincoln, actress (died 2025)
  - Jerry Trimble, actor and stuntman
- May 28 – Mark F. Giuliano, law enforcement official (died 2024)
- May 31 – Lea Thompson, actress and director

=== June ===
- June 5 – Mary Kay Bergman, voice actress (died 1999)
- June 16 – David Adkins, member of the West Virginia House of Delegates
- June 28
  - Mike Lindell, businessman and political activist
  - Charles M. Roessel, Navajo photographer and journalist (died 2025)

=== July ===
- July 6 – Robin Antin, American dancer, choreographer, and businesswoman
- July 7 – Eric Jerome Dickey, author (died 2021)
- July 14 – Jackie Earle Haley, actor
- July 15 – Scott Ritter, soldier and international weapons inspector
- July 23 – Woody Harrelson, actor and playwright

=== August ===
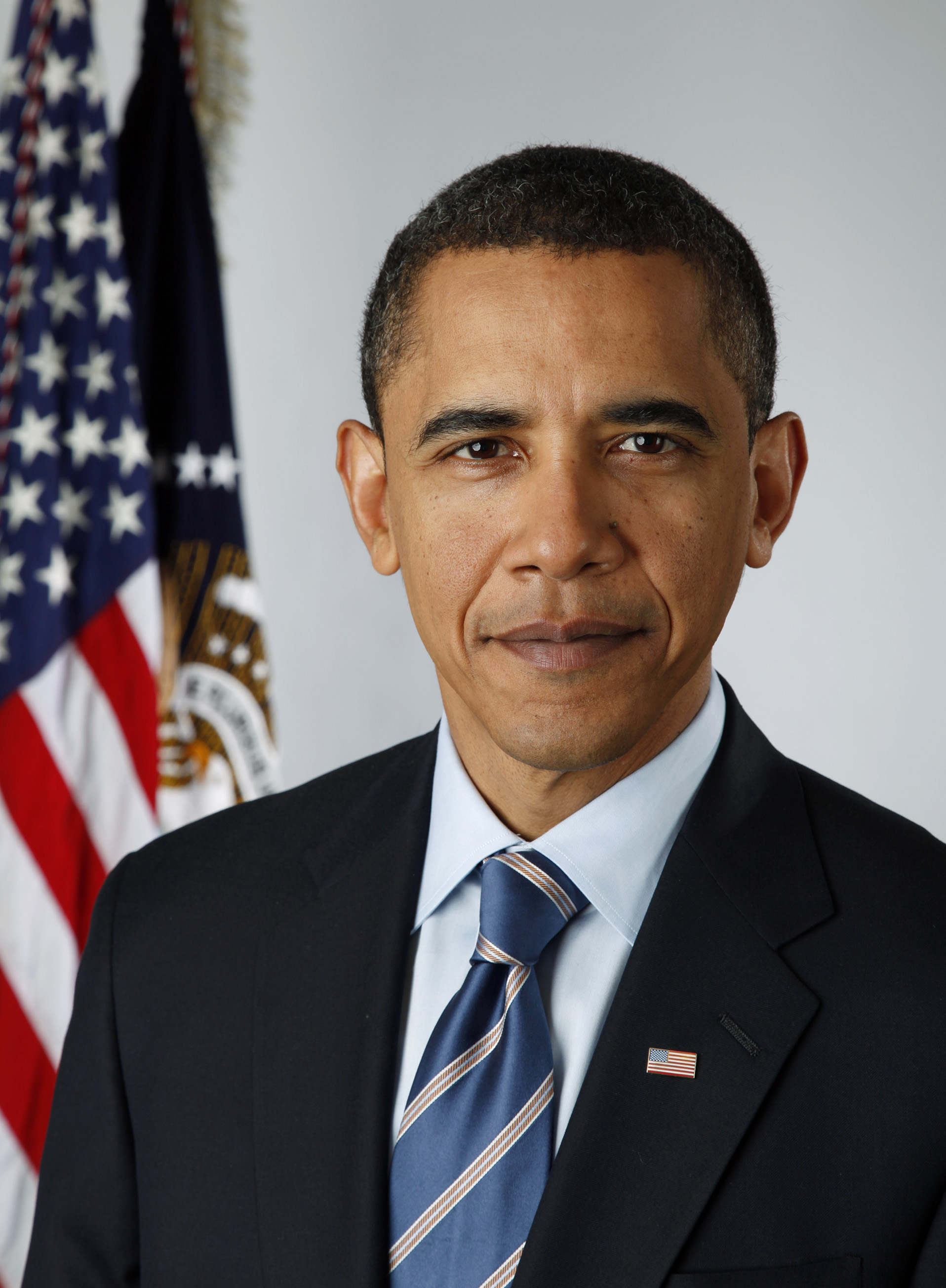
Barack Obama

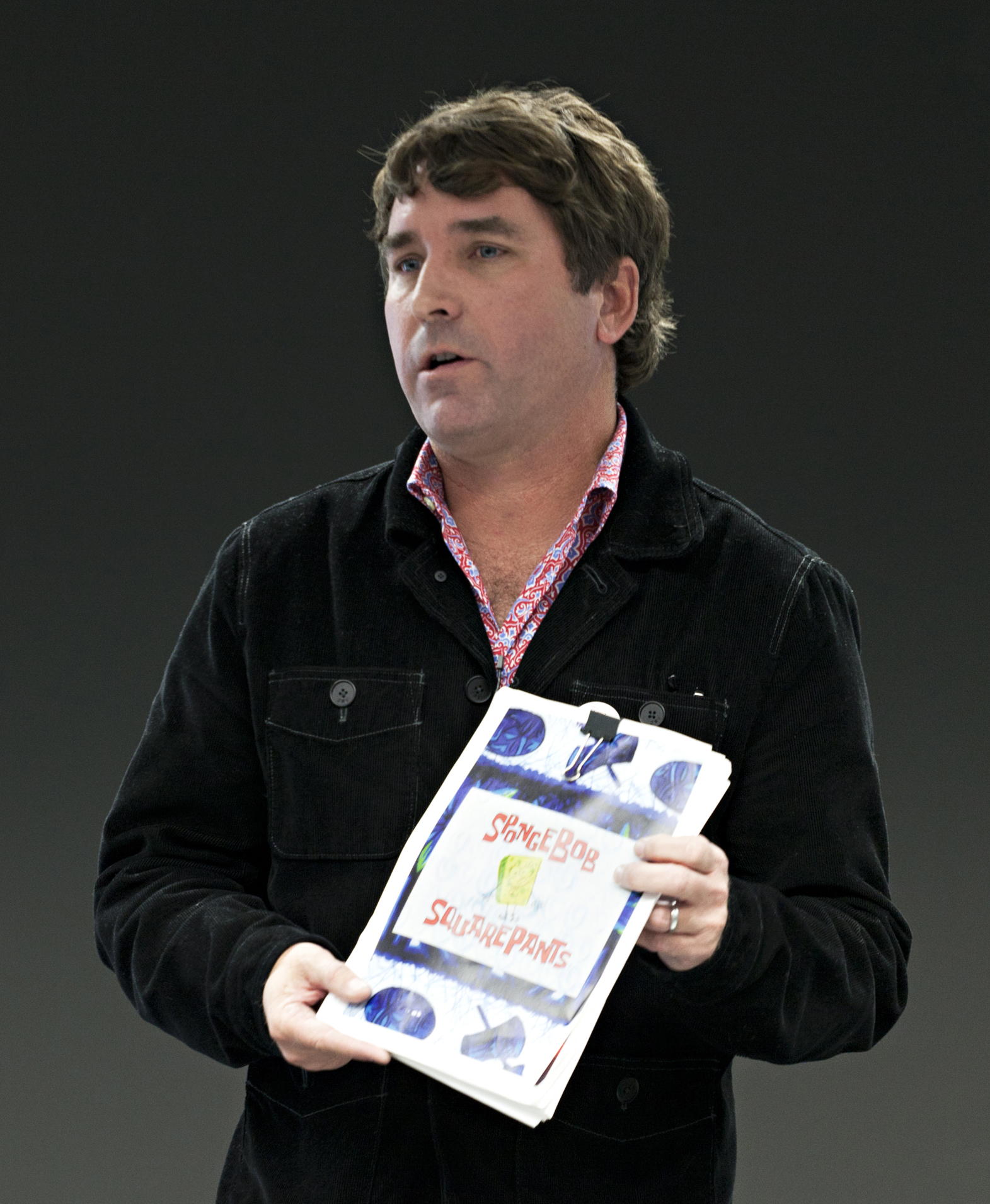
Stephen Hillenburg

- August 4
  - Robin Carnahan, lawyer and politician
  - Eddie James, convicted murderer (executed 2025)
  - Barack Obama, 44th president of the United States from 2009 to 2017
- August 5 – Tawny Kitaen, actress and model (died 2021)
- August 9 – Amy Stiller, actress, daughter of Jerry Stiller and Anne Meara and sister of Ben Stiller
- August 10 – Billy Ray Smith Jr., American football player (died 2026)
- August 21 – Stephen Hillenburg, marine biologist, cartoonist (died 2018)
- August 25 – Billy Ray Cyrus, singer
- August 28 – Jennifer Coolidge, actress

=== September ===
- September 8 – Wendi Richter, wrestler
- September 9 – Jim Corsi, baseball player (died 2022)
- September 11 – E.G. Daily, actress, voice actress and singer
- September 23 – Chi McBride, actor
- September 25 – Frankie Randall, boxer, welterweight world champion (died 2020)

=== October ===
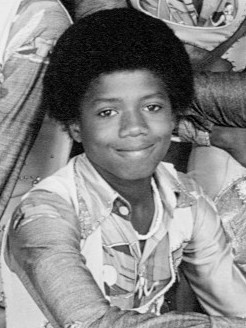
Randy Jackson

- October 5
  - David Bryson, guitarist and singer-songwriter
  - Sharon Cheslow, singer-songwriter and guitarist
- October 10 – Jodi Benson, actress and singer
- October 26 – Dylan McDermott, actor
- October 28 – Derek Bunch, former NFL linebacker
- October 29 – Randy Jackson, younger brother of Michael Jackson and member of the Jackson 5.

=== November ===
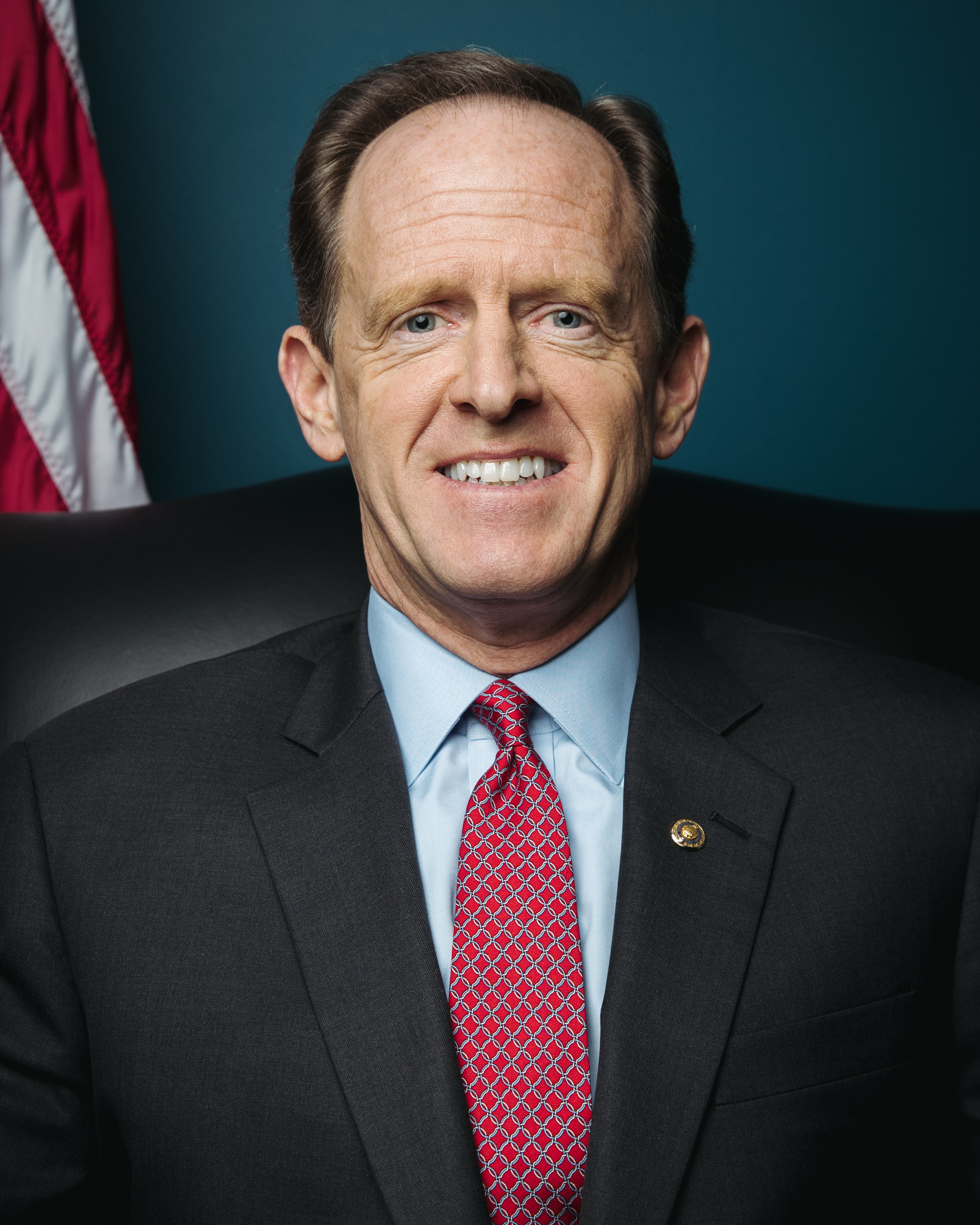
Pat Toomey

- November 1 – Ryan Zinke, 52nd United States Secretary of the Interior
- November 17
  - Pat Toomey, U.S. Senator from Pennsylvania from 2011 to 2023.
  - Robert Stethem, U.S. Navy Seabee diver murdered by Hezbollah terrorists during the hijacking of TWA Flight 847 (killed 1985)
- November 18 – Gwen Knapp, sports journalist (died 2023)
- November 19 - Meg Ryan, American actress
- November 20
  - Jim Brickman, singer-songwriter and pianist
  - Phil Joanou, TV director
- November 22
  - Mariel Hemingway, actress and sister of Margaux Hemingway
  - John Schnatter, entrepreneur and the founder of Papa John's Pizza
- November 26 - Lisa Moretti, wrestler
- November 29 – Tom Sizemore, actor (died 2023)

=== December ===
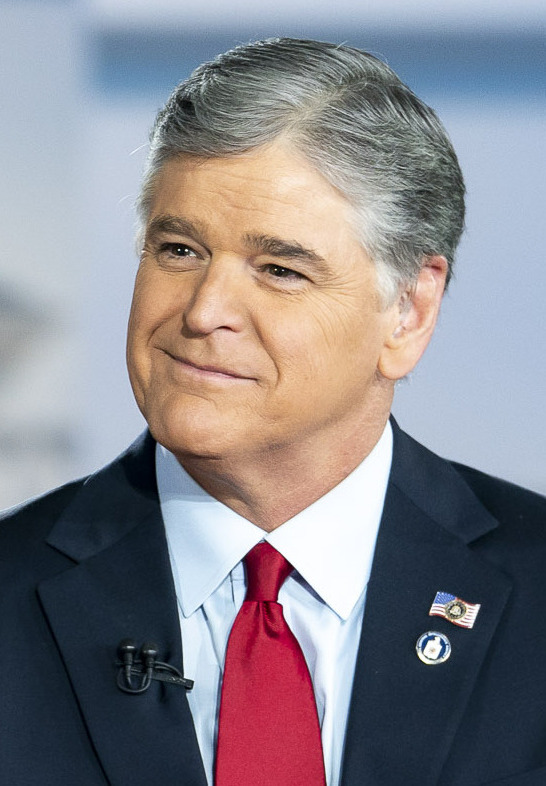
Sean Hannity

- December 8 – Ann Coulter, political commentator
- December 9 – Joe Lando, actor
- December 12 – Jack Ciattarelli, politician
- December 13 – Maurice Smith, martial artist
- December 16
  - Bill Hicks, comedian (died 1994)
  - Jon Tenney, actor
  - Sam Robards, actor
  - Shane Black, film director
- December 22 – Andrew Fastow, businessman
- December 24 – Mary Barra, CEO of General Motors
- December 30 – Sean Hannity, talk show host

== Deaths ==
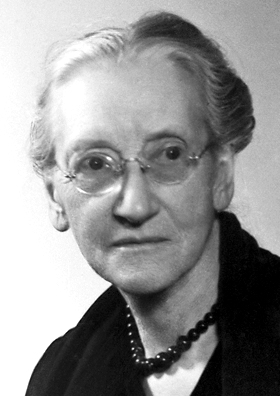
Emily Greene Balch

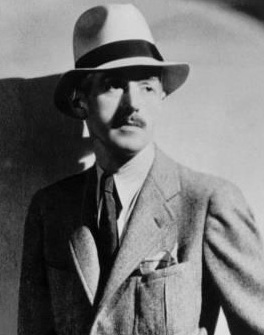
Dashiell Hammett

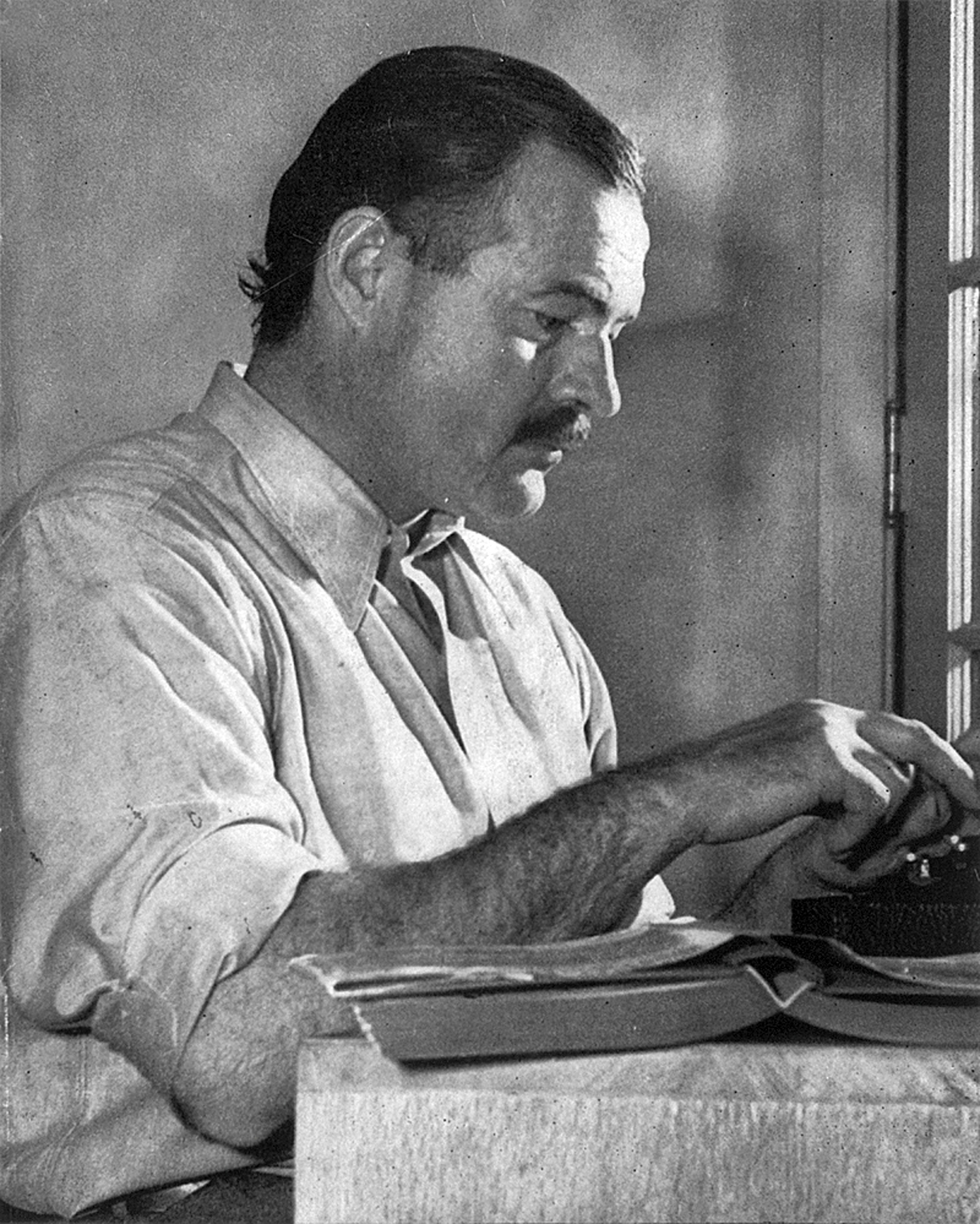
Ernest Hemingway

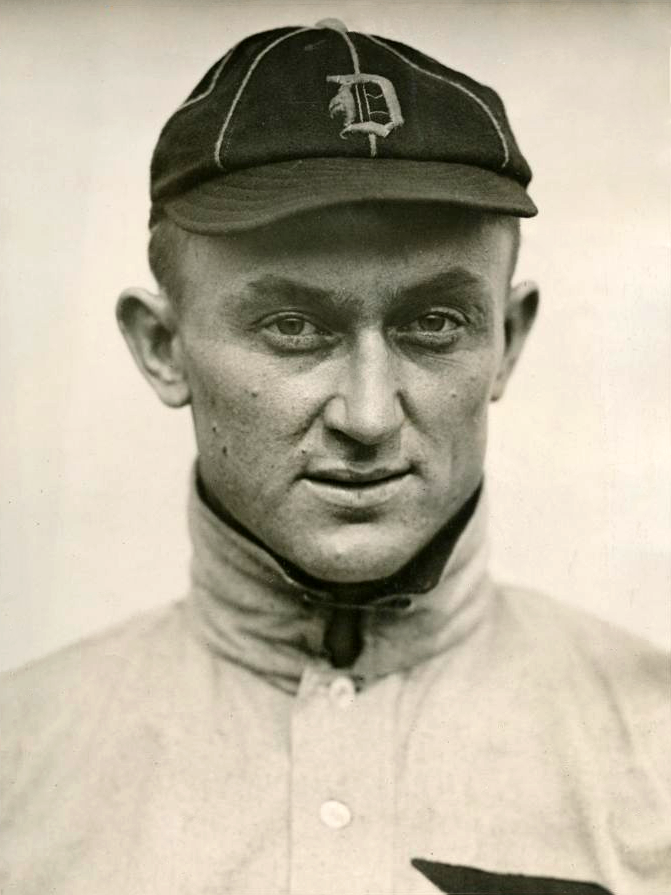
Ty Cobb

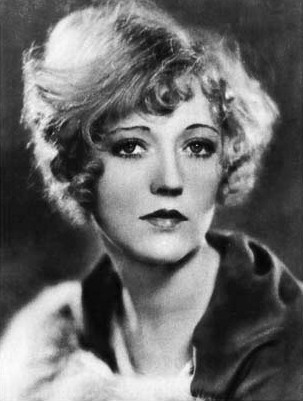
Marion Davies

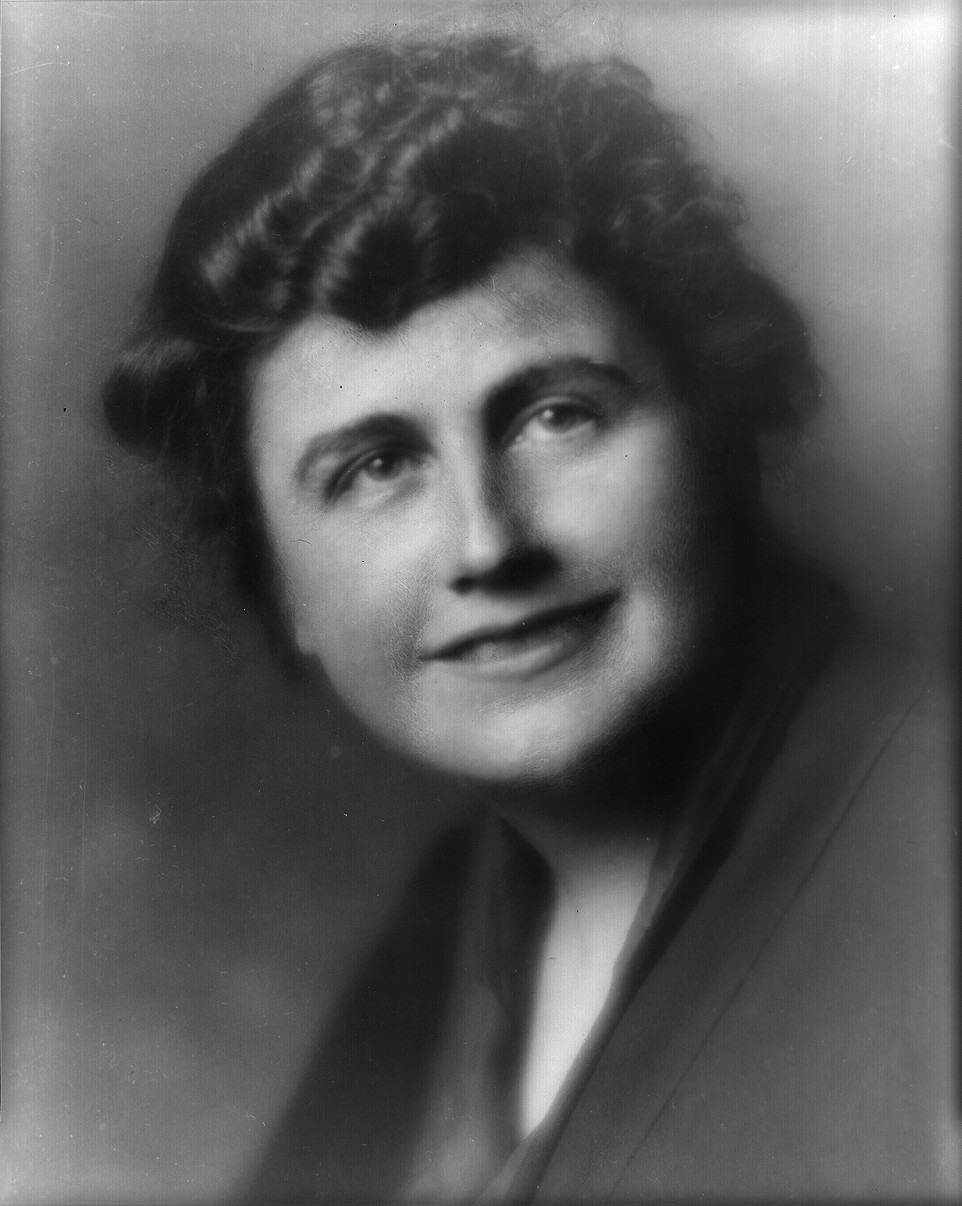
Edith Wilson

- January 9 – Emily Greene Balch, writer, pacifist and winner of the Nobel Peace Prize in 1946 (born 1867)
- January 10 – Dashiell Hammett, writer (born 1894)
- January 19 – Nathaniel Baldwin, inventor and Mormon fundamentalist (born 1878)
- January 24 – Alfred Carlton Gilbert, inventor, athlete, magician, businessman, and toy maker (born 1884)
- January 29 – John F. O'Ryan, soldier, lawyer and politician (born 1874)
- February 3 – Anna May Wong, film actress (born 1905)
- March 12 – Belinda Lee, English actress (born 1935 in the United Kingdom)
- March 17 – Susanna M. Salter, politician and activist (born 1860)
- April 7 – Marian Driscoll Jordan, actress and radio personality (born 1898)
- May 8 – Raymond DeWalt, inventor and businessman (born 1885)
- May 13 – Gary Cooper, actor (born 1901)
- May 16 – George A. Malcolm, jurist and educator (born 1881)
- May 19 – Grace George, actress (born 1879)
- May 23 – Joan Davis, comedic actress and vaudevillian (born 1912)
- June 1 – Melvin Jones, founder of Lions Clubs International (born 1879)
- June 2 – George S. Kaufman, playwright (born 1889)
- June 17
  - Jeff Chandler, actor (born 1918)
  - Thomas Darden, rear admiral, 37th Governor of American Samoa (born 1900)
- June 24 – William J. Connors, politician (born 1891)
- June 27 – Paul Guilfoyle, actor (born 1902)
- June 30 – Lee de Forest, inventor (born 1873)
- July 2 – Ernest Hemingway, fiction writer, journalist and winner of the Pulitzer Prize for The Old Man and the Sea (born 1899)
- July 4 – Franklyn Farnum, actor (born 1878)
- July 6 – Woodall Rodgers, lawyer and politician, Mayor of Dallas (born 1890)
- July 9 – Alan Marshal, Australian-born actor (born 1909)
- July 17 – Ty Cobb, baseball player (born 1886)
- August 26 – Gail Russell, actress (born 1924)
- August 30 – Charles Coburn, actor (born 1877)
- September 3 – Fay-Cooper Cole, anthropologist (born 1881)
- September 10 – Leo Carrillo, actor (born 1880)
- September 11 – George Irving, actor (born 1874)
- September 13 – Fay Roope, actor (born 1893)
- September 22 – Marion Davies, actress (born 1897)
- September 23 – John Eldredge, actor (born 1904)
- September 25 – Frank Fay, actor (born 1897)
- October 1 – Donald Cook, actor (born 1901)
- October 11
  - Lucy Tayiah Eads, Kaw tribal chief (born 1888)
  - Chico Marx, comedian (born 1887)
- October 22 – Joseph M. Schenck, studio film executive (born 1876 in Russia)
- October 31 – Jim Aiken, football and basketball player and coach (born 1899)
- November 2 – James Thurber, cartoonist, writer, humorist, journalist, and playwright (born 1894)
- November 13 – Wally Brown, actor and comedian (born 1904)
- November 16 – Sam Rayburn, politician (born 1882)
- November 29 – Sidney Siegel, psychologist (born 1916)
- December 13 – Grandma Moses, painter and folk artist (born 1860)
- December 20 – Moss Hart, playwright, librettist, and theater director (born 1904)
- December 22 – Dick Elliott, actor (born 1886)
- December 25 – Otto Loewi, pharmacologist (born 1873 in Germany)
- December 28 – Edith Wilson, First Lady of the United States (born 1872)

== See also ==
- List of American films of 1961
- Timeline of United States history (1950–1969)
