= 1891 in the United States =

- Decades: 1870s; 1880s; 1890s; 1900s; 1910s
- See also: History of the United States (1865–1918); Timeline of United States history (1860–1899); List of years in the United States

Events from the year 1891 in the United States.

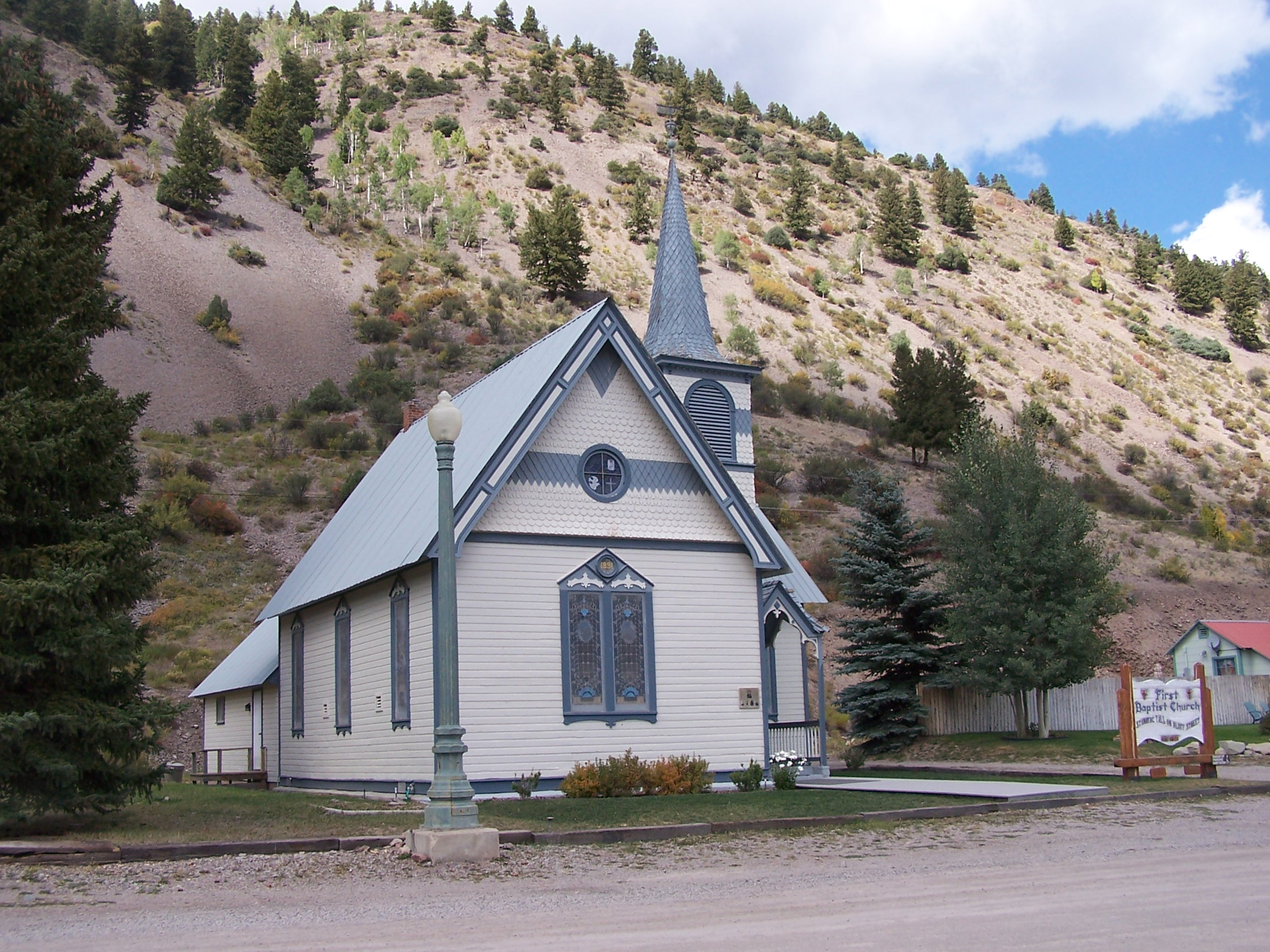
First Baptist Church in Lake City, Colorado, built in 1891

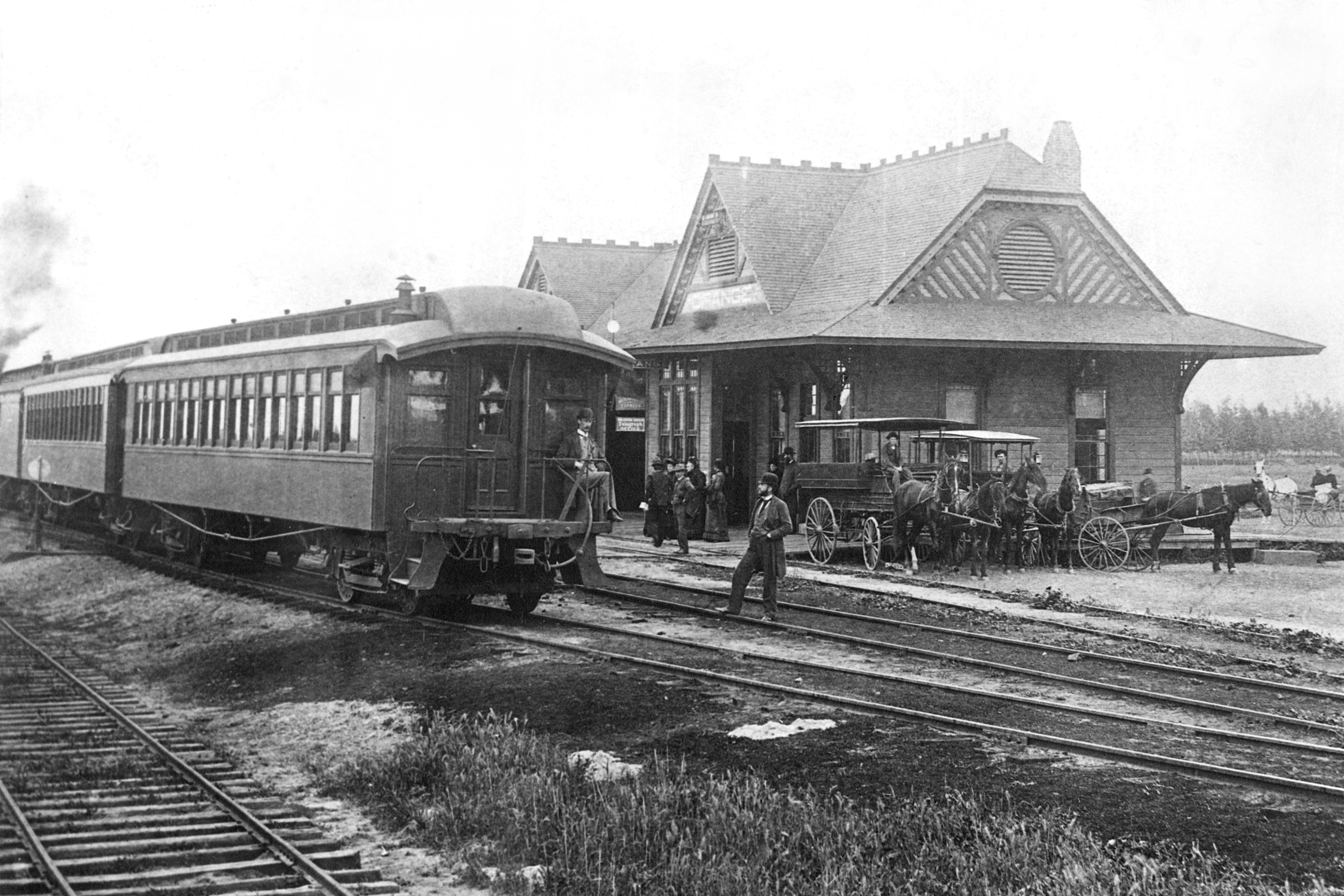
Santa Fe Railroad Depot, Orange, California in 1891

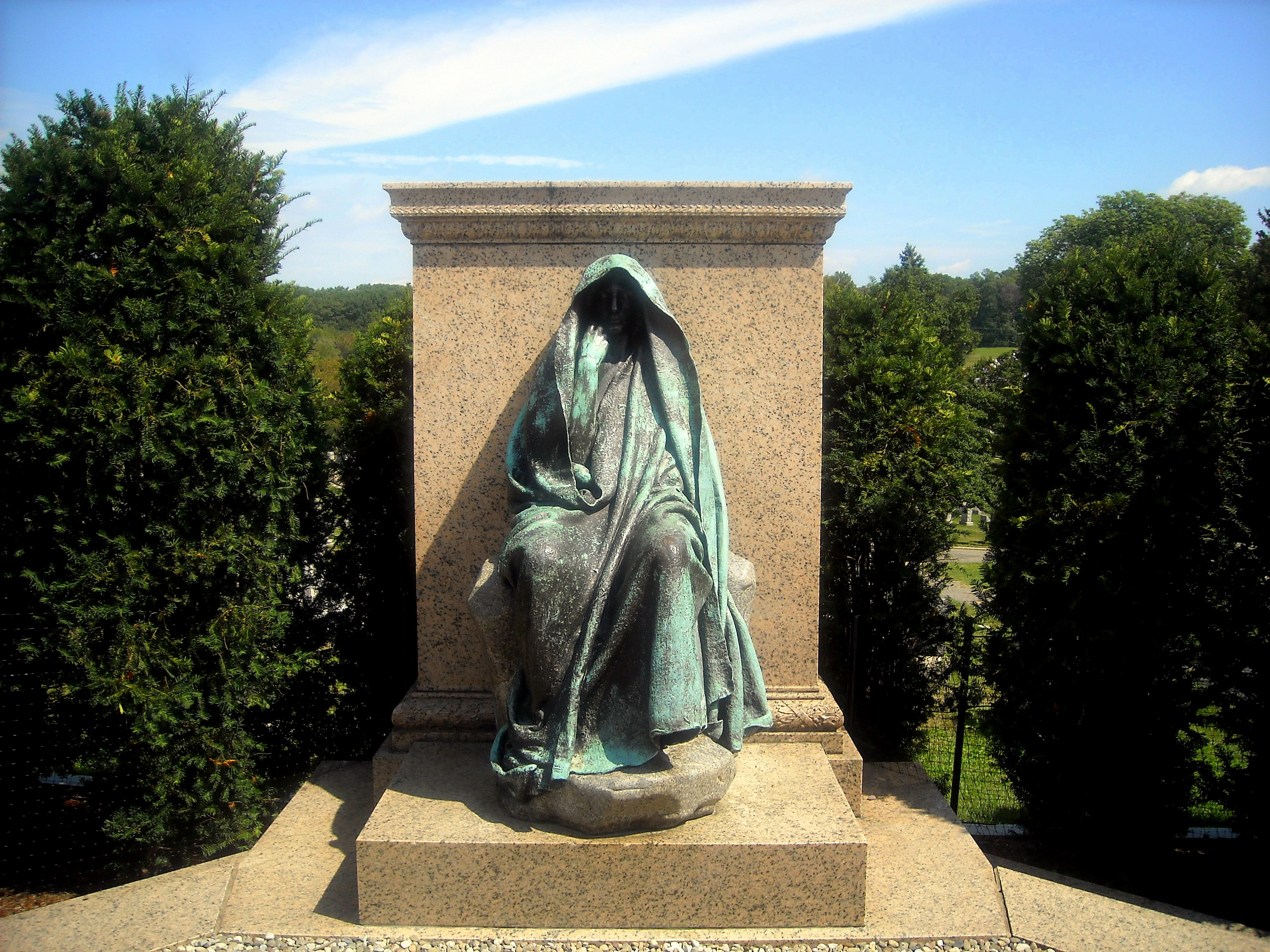
Adams Memorial by Augustus Saint-Gaudens, built in 1891, Washington, D.C.

== Incumbents ==
=== Federal government ===
- President: Benjamin Harrison (R-Indiana)
- Vice President: Levi P. Morton (R-New York)
- Chief Justice: Melville Fuller (Illinois)
- Speaker of the House of Representatives:

Thomas Brackett Reed (R-Maine) (until March 4)
Charles Frederick Crisp (D-Georgia) (starting December 8)

- Congress: 51st (until March 4), 52nd (starting March 4)

==== State governments ====
Governors and lieutenant governors

=== Governors ===
- Governor of Alabama: Thomas G. Jones (Democratic)
- Governor of Arkansas: James Philip Eagle (Democratic)
- Governor of California: Robert Waterman (Republican) (until January 8), Henry Markham (Republican) (starting January 8)
- Governor of Colorado: Job Adams Cooper (Republican) (until January 13), John Long Routt (Republican) (starting January 13)
- Governor of Connecticut: Morgan G. Bulkeley (Republican)
- Governor of Delaware: Benjamin T. Biggs (Democratic) (until January 20), Robert J. Reynolds (Democratic) (starting January 20)
- Governor of Florida: Francis P. Fleming (Democratic)
- Governor of Georgia: William J. Northen (Democratic)
- Governor of Idaho: N. B. Willey (Republican)
- Governor of Illinois: Joseph W. Fifer (Republican)
- Governor of Indiana: Alvin P. Hovey (Republican) (until November 23), Ira Joy Chase (Republican) (starting November 23)
- Governor of Iowa: Horace Boies (Democratic)
- Governor of Kansas: Lyman U. Humphrey (Republican)
- Governor of Kentucky: Simon B. Buckner (Democratic) (until September 2), John Y. Brown (Democratic) (starting September 2)
- Governor of Louisiana: Francis T. Nicholls (Democratic)
- Governor of Maine: Edwin C. Burleigh (Republican)
- Governor of Maryland: Elihu Emory Jackson (Democratic)
- Governor of Massachusetts: John Q. A. Brackett (Republican) (until January 8), William E. Russell (Democratic) (starting January 8)
- Governor of Michigan: Cyrus G. Luce (Republican) (until January 1), Edwin B. Winans (Democratic) (starting January 1)
- Governor of Minnesota: William R. Merriam (Republican)
- Governor of Mississippi: John M. Stone (Democratic)
- Governor of Missouri: David R. Francis (Democratic)
- Governor of Montana: Joseph Toole (Democratic)
- Governor of Nebraska: John Milton Thayer (Republican)
- Governor of Nevada: Frank Bell (Republican) (until January 5), Roswell K. Colcord (Republican) (starting January 5)
- Governor of New Hampshire: David H. Goodell (Republican) (until January 8), Hiram A. Tuttle (Republican) (starting January 8)
- Governor of New Jersey: Leon Abbett (Democratic)
- Governor of New York: David B. Hill (Democratic) (until end of December 31)
- Governor of North Carolina: Daniel Gould Fowle (Democratic) (until April 7), Thomas Michael Holt (Democratic) (starting April 7)
- Governor of North Dakota: John Miller (Republican) (until January 7), Andrew H. Burke (Republican) (starting January 7)
- Governor of Ohio: James E. Campbell (Democratic)
- Governor of Oregon: Sylvester Pennoyer (Democratic)
- Governor of Pennsylvania: James A. Beaver (Republican) (until January 20), Robert E. Pattison (Democratic) (starting January 20)
- Governor of Rhode Island: John W. Davis (Democratic) (until May 26), Herbert W. Ladd (Republican) (starting May 26)
- Governor of South Carolina: Benjamin Ryan Tillman (Democratic)
- Governor of South Dakota: Arthur C. Mellette (Republican)
- Governor of Tennessee: Robert Love Taylor (Democratic) (until January 19), John P. Buchanan (Democratic) (starting January 19)
- Governor of Texas: Lawrence Sullivan Ross (Democratic) (until January 20), James Stephen Hogg (Democratic) (starting January 20)
- Governor of Vermont: Carroll S. Page (Republican)
- Governor of Virginia: Philip W. McKinney (Democratic)
- Governor of Washington: Elisha Peyre Ferry (Republican)
- Governor of West Virginia: Aretas B. Fleming (Democratic)
- Governor of Wisconsin: William D. Hoard (Republican) (until January 5), George W. Peck (Democratic) (starting January 5)
- Governor of Wyoming: Amos W. Barber (Republican)

=== Lieutenant governors ===
- Lieutenant Governor of California: Stephen M. White (Democratic) (until January 8), John B. Reddick (Republican) (starting January 8)
- Lieutenant Governor of Colorado: William Grover Smith (Republican) (until January 13), William Story (Republican) (starting January 13)
- Lieutenant Governor of Connecticut: Samuel E. Merwin (Republican)
- Lieutenant Governor of Idaho: John S. Gray (Republican)
- Lieutenant Governor of Illinois: Lyman Ray (Republican)
- Lieutenant Governor of Indiana: Ira Joy Chase (Republican) (until November 23), Francis M. Griffith (Republican) (starting November 23)
- Lieutenant Governor of Iowa: Alfred N. Poyneer (Republican)
- Lieutenant Governor of Kansas: Andrew J. Felt (Republican)
- Lieutenant Governor of Kentucky: James William Bryan (Democratic) (until September 2), Mitchell Cary Alford (Democratic) (starting September 2)
- Lieutenant Governor of Louisiana: James Jeffries (Democratic)
- Lieutenant Governor of Massachusetts: William H. Haile (political party unknown)
- Lieutenant Governor of Michigan: William Ball (Republican) (until January 1), John Strong (Democratic) (starting January 1)
- Lieutenant Governor of Minnesota: Albert E. Rice (Republican) (until January 5), Gideon S. Ives (Republican) (starting January 5)
- Lieutenant Governor of Mississippi: M. M. Evans (Democratic)
- Lieutenant Governor of Missouri: Stephen Hugh Claycomb (Democratic)
- Lieutenant Governor of Montana: John E. Rickards (Republican)
- Lieutenant Governor of Nebraska: George D. Meiklejohn (Republican) (until month and day unknown), Thomas J. Majors (Republican) (starting month and day unknown)
- Lieutenant Governor of Nevada: Frank Bell (Republican) (until month and day unknown), Joseph Poujade (political party unknown) (starting month and day unknown)
- Lieutenant Governor of New York: Edward F. Jones (Democratic) (until end of December 31)
- Lieutenant Governor of North Carolina: Thomas M. Holt (Democratic) (until April 7), vacant (starting April 7)
- Lieutenant Governor of North Dakota: Alfred Dickey (Republican) (until January 7), Roger Allin (Republican) (starting January 7)
- Lieutenant Governor of Ohio: William V. Marquis (Republican)
- Lieutenant Governor of Pennsylvania: William T. Davies (Republican) (until January 20), Louis Arthur Watres (Republican) (starting January 20)
- Lieutenant Governor of Rhode Island: William T. C. Wardwell (political party unknown) (until May 26), Henry A. Stearns (political party unknown) (starting May 26)
- Lieutenant Governor of South Carolina: Eugene B. Gary (Democratic)
- Lieutenant Governor of South Dakota: James H. Fletcher (Republican) (until month and day unknown), George H. Hoffman (Republican) (starting month and day unknown)
- Lieutenant Governor of Tennessee: Benjamin J. Lea (Democratic) (until month and day unknown), William C. Dismukes (Democratic) (starting month and day unknown)
- Lieutenant Governor of Texas: Thomas B. Wheeler (Democratic) (until January 19), George Cassety Pendleton (Democratic) (starting January 19)
- Lieutenant Governor of Vermont: Henry A. Fletcher (Republican)
- Lieutenant Governor of Virginia: James Hoge Tyler (Democratic)
- Lieutenant Governor of Washington: Charles E. Laughton (Republican)
- Lieutenant Governor of Wisconsin: George W. Ryland (Republican) (until January 5), Charles Jonas (Democratic) (starting January 5)

== Events ==
- January 2 – A. L. Drummond of New York is appointed Chief of the Treasury Secret Service.
- January 5 – Henry B. Brown, of Michigan, is sworn in as an Associate Justice of the Supreme Court.
- January 13 – In California, Leland Stanford (Rep.) re-elected Senator.
- January 17 – George Bancroft dies at Washington DC at age 91, all government buildings flying flags lower to half mast until after the funeral.
- January 20 – Jim Hogg becomes the first native Texan to be governor of that state.
- January 27 – Mammoth Mine disaster
- January 29 – Liliuokalani is proclaimed Queen of Hawaii.
- March 3
  - The International Copyright Act of 1891 is passed by the Fifty-first United States Congress.
  - The Ocean Mail Act of 1891 is passed by the Fifty-first United States Congress, providing subsidies to steamships for the carrying of mails between US and foreign ports.
  - Yellowstone Timberland Reserve, predecessor of Shoshone National Forest, in Wyoming is established as the first United States National Forest.
- March 14 – In New Orleans, a lynch mob storms the Old Parish Prison and lynches 11 Italian Americans who had been found not guilty of the murder of Police Chief David Hennessy.
- March 30 – Shoshone National Forest is established in Wyoming, the first U.S. National Forest.
- April 1 – The Wrigley Company is founded in Chicago.
- May 5 – The Music Hall in New York (later known as Carnegie Hall) has its grand opening and first public performance, with Tchaikovsky as guest conductor.
- May 20 – Thomas Edison's prototype kinetoscope is first displayed at Edison's Laboratory, for a convention of the National Federation of Women's Clubs.
- June – Profitable Advertising was established in Boston
- June 1 – The Johnstown Inclined Plane opens in Johnstown, Pennsylvania.
- June 21 – First long-distance transmission of alternating current by the Ames power plant near Telluride, Colorado by Lucien and Paul Nunn.
- July 7 – The Home Alliance was established in Woodland, California
- September 23 – California Institute of Technology in California is founded.
- October 1 – Stanford University in California opens its doors.
- October 16 – White River National Forest is established in Colorado.
- November 28 – The International Brotherhood of Electrical Workers is organized in St. Louis, Missouri.
- December 17 – Drexel University is inaugurated as the Drexel Institute of Art, Science and Industry in Philadelphia.

=== Undated ===
- Seattle University is established as the Immaculate Conception school.
- Marie Owens becomes (probably) the first female police officer in the U.S., with the Chicago Police Department.
- Jesse W. Reno invents the first working escalator, installed as an attraction at the Old Iron Pier, Coney Island, New York City.

=== Ongoing ===
- Gilded Age (1869–c. 1896)
- Gay Nineties (1890–1899)
- Progressive Era (1890s–1920s)
- Garza Revolution in Texas and Mexico (1891–1893)

== Births ==
=== January–June ===
- January 1 – Charles Bickford, actor (died 1967)
- January 2 – Charles P. Thompson, actor (died 1979)
- January 7 – Zora Neale Hurston, Harlem Renaissance writer (died 1960)
- January 25 – Wellman Braud, jazz bassist (died 1966)
- January 28 – Bill Doak, baseball player (died 1954)
- January 30 – Walter Beech, aviator and aircraft manufacturer (died 1950)
- February 10 – Elliot Paul, writer (died 1958)
- February 12 – Eugene Millikin, U.S. Senator from Colorado from 1941 to 1957 (died 1958)
- February 13 – Grant Wood, painter (died 1942)
- February 15 – Henry J. Knauf, politician (died 1950)
- March 10 – Sam Jaffe, actor (died 1984)
- March 19 – Earl Warren, Chief Justice of the United States (died 1974)
- March 26 – Will Wright, actor (died 1962)
- April 13 – Nella Larsen, novelist (died 1964)
- April 15 – Wallace Reid, actor (died 1923)
- April 19 – W. Alton Jones, industrialist and philanthropist (died 1962)
- April 26 – Lucy Mercer Rutherfurd, mistress of Franklin D. Roosevelt (died 1948)
- May 21 – John Peale Bishop, writer (died 1944)
- May 22 – Eddie Edwards, jazz trombonist (died 1963)
- May 24 – William F. Albright, archeologist and Biblical scholar (died 1971)
- May 26 –
  - Maxwell Bodenheim, poet and novelist (murdered 1954)
  - Mamie Smith, African American blues singer (died 1946)
- May 30 – Ben Bernie, bandleader (died 1943)
- June 3 – Jim Tully, vagabond, pugilist and writer (died 1947)
- June 8 – Audrey Munson, model and silent film actress (died 1996)
- June 9 – Cole Porter, composer and songwriter (died 1964)
- June 28
  - Esther Forbes, historical fiction writer (died 1967)
  - Carl Panzram, serial killer and rapist (executed 1930)
- June 30 – Man Mountain Dean, wrestler (died 1953)

=== July–December ===
- July 5 – John Howard Northrop, biochemist, winner of the Nobel Prize in Chemistry in 1946 (suicide 1987)
- July 10 – Edith Quimby, medical researcher and physicist (died 1982)
- July 16 – Blossom Seeley, singer and vaudeville performer (died 1974)
- July 18 – Billy Sullivan, actor (died 1946)
- July 26 – William J. Connors, politician (died 1961)
- August 1 – Edward Streeter, humorist (died 1976)
- August 15 – Chief Yowlachie, Native American actor (died 1966)
- August 29 – Joyce Hall, founder of Hallmark Cards (died 1982)
- September 3 – Annie Elizabeth Delany, African American physician and author (died 1995)
- September 28 – Myrtle Gonzalez, silent film actress (died 1918)
- October 7 – Charles R. Chickering, illustrator (died 1970)
- October 25 – Charles Coughlin, antisemitic radio host and Catholic priest (died 1979)
- October 29 – Fanny Brice, actress, comedian and singer (died 1951)
- November 2 – David Townsend, art director (died 1935)
- November 7 – Miriam Cooper, silent film actress (died 1976)
- November 10 – Carl Stalling, cartoon film composer (died 1972)
- November 15 – Vincent Astor, philanthropist (died 1959)
- November 20 – Leon Cadore, baseball pitcher (died 1958)
- December 14
  - Katherine MacDonald, silent film actress (died 1956)
  - Lester Melrose, record producer of the Chicago blues genre (died 1968)
- December 26 – Henry Miller, novelist (died 1980)

== Deaths ==
- January 5 – Emma Abbott, operatic soprano (born 1850)
- January 17 – George Bancroft, historian (born 1800)
- January 29 – William Windom, U.S. Senator from Minnesota from 1870 to 1881 and from 1881 to 1883 (born 1827)
- February 14 – William Tecumseh Sherman, Civil War general (born 1820)
- February 21 – James Timberlake, law enforcement officer (born 1846)
- February 28 – George Hearst, U.S. Senator from California from 1887 to 1891 (born 1820)
- March 6
  - George M. Chilcott, U.S. Senator from Colorado from 1882 to 1883 (born 1828)
  - Joshua Hill, U.S. Senator from Georgia from 1871 to 1873 (born 1812)
- March 21 – Joseph E. Johnston, Confederate Army general (born 1807)
- April 2 – Albert Pike, Confederate military officer, attorney, writer and Freemason (born 1809)
- April 7 – P. T. Barnum, showman, businessman, and politician (b. 1810)
- April 14 – Annie Nowlin Savery, suffragist (born 1831 in the United Kingdom)
- June 9 – Henry Edwards, entomologist and actor (born 1827 in the United Kingdom)
- June 17 – Harrison Ludington, 13th Governor of Wisconsin from 1876 to 1878 (born 1812)
- June 21 – Joseph E. McDonald, U.S. Senator from Indiana from 1875 to 1881 (born 1819)
- July 4 – Hannibal Hamlin, 15th vice president of the United States from 1861 to 1865 (born 1809)
- August 5 – Thomas S. Bocock, U.S. Congressman, Speaker of the Confederate States House of Representatives (born 1815)
- August 12 – James Russell Lowell, Romantic poet, critic, satirist, writer, diplomat and abolitionist (born 1819)
- August 14
  - John Henry Hopkins Jr., clergyman and hymnist (born 1820)
  - Sarah Childress Polk, First Lady of the U.S. (born 1803)
- August 27 – Samuel C. Pomeroy, U.S. Senator from Kansas from 1861 to 1873 (born 1816)
- September 10 – Charles B. Clark, politician and entrepreneur (born 1844)
- September 28 – Herman Melville, novelist, short story writer and poet (born 1819)
- October 16 – Sarah Winnemucca, Northern Paiute author, activist and educator (born 1844)
- November 6 – J. Gregory Smith, Vermont governor (born 1818)
- November 17 – George H. Cooper, admiral (born 1821)
- December 7 – Mary Crane, activist; mother of writer Stephen Crane (born 1827)
- December 12 – Julia A. Ames, reformer (born 1861)
- December 20 – Preston B. Plumb, U.S. Senator from Kansas from 1877 to 1891 (born 1837)
- December 29 – Marion McKinley Bovard, academic administrator, 1st president of the University of Southern California (born 1847)

== See also ==
- List of American films of the 1890s
- Timeline of United States history (1860–1899)
