= 1894 in the United States =

- Decades: 1870s; 1880s; 1890s; 1900s; 1910s
- See also: History of the United States (1865–1918); Timeline of United States history (1860–1899); List of years in the United States

Events from the year 1894 in the United States.

== Incumbents ==
=== Federal government ===
- President: Grover Cleveland (D-New York)
- Vice President: Adlai E. Stevenson I (D-Illinois)
- Chief Justice: Melville Fuller (Illinois)
- Speaker of the House of Representatives: Charles Frederick Crisp (D-Georgia)
- Congress: 53rd

==== State governments ====
Governors and lieutenant governors

=== Governors ===
- Governor of Alabama: Thomas G. Jones (Democratic) (until December 1), William C. Oates (Democratic) (starting December 1)
- Governor of Arkansas: William Meade Fishback (Democratic)
- Governor of California: Henry Markham (Republican)
- Governor of Colorado: Davis Hanson Waite (People's)
- Governor of Connecticut: Luzon B. Morris (Democratic)
- Governor of Delaware: Robert J. Reynolds (Democratic)
- Governor of Florida: Henry L. Mitchell (Democratic)
- Governor of Georgia: William J. Northen (Democratic) (until October 27), William Yates Atkinson (Democratic) (starting October 27)
- Governor of Idaho: William J. McConnell (Republican)
- Governor of Illinois: John Peter Altgeld (Democratic)
- Governor of Indiana: Claude Matthews (Democratic)
- Governor of Iowa: Horace Boies (Democratic) (until January 11), Frank D. Jackson (Republican) (starting January 11)
- Governor of Kansas: Lorenzo D. Lewelling (Populist)
- Governor of Kentucky: John Y. Brown (Democratic)
- Governor of Louisiana: Murphy James Foster Sr. (Democratic)
- Governor of Maine: Henry B. Cleaves (Republican)
- Governor of Maryland: Frank Brown (Democratic)
- Governor of Massachusetts: William E. Russell (Democratic) (until January 4), Frederic T. Greenhalge (Republican) (starting January 4)
- Governor of Michigan: John T. Rich (Republican)
- Governor of Minnesota: Knute Nelson (Republican)
- Governor of Mississippi: John M. Stone (Democratic)
- Governor of Missouri: William Joel Stone (Democratic)
- Governor of Montana: John E. Rickards (Republican)
- Governor of Nebraska: Lorenzo Crounse (Republican)
- Governor of Nevada: Roswell K. Colcord (Republican)
- Governor of New Hampshire: John Butler Smith (Republican)
- Governor of New Jersey: George Theodore Werts (Democratic)
- Governor of New York: Roswell P. Flower (Democratic) (until end of December 31)
- Governor of North Carolina: Elias Carr (Democratic)
- Governor of North Dakota: Eli C. D. Shortridge (Democratic)/(Independent)
- Governor of Ohio: William McKinley (Republican)
- Governor of Oregon: Sylvester Pennoyer (Democratic)
- Governor of Pennsylvania: Robert E. Pattison (Democratic)
- Governor of Rhode Island: D. Russell Brown (Republican)
- Governor of South Carolina: Benjamin Ryan Tillman (Democratic) (until December 4), John Gary Evans (Democratic) (starting December 4)
- Governor of South Dakota: Charles H. Sheldon (Republican)
- Governor of Tennessee: Peter Turney (Democratic)
- Governor of Texas: James Stephen Hogg (Democratic)
- Governor of Vermont: Levi K. Fuller (Republican) (until October 4), Urban A. Woodbury (Republican) (starting October 4)
- Governor of Virginia: Philip W. McKinney (Democratic) (until January 1), Charles Triplett O'Ferrall (Democratic) (starting January 1)
- Governor of Washington: John McGraw (Republican)
- Governor of West Virginia: William A. MacCorkle (Democratic)
- Governor of Wisconsin: George W. Peck (Democratic)
- Governor of Wyoming: John E. Osborne (Democratic)

=== Lieutenant governors ===
- Lieutenant Governor of California: John B. Reddick (Republican)
- Lieutenant Governor of Colorado: David Hopkinson Nichols (Democratic)
- Lieutenant Governor of Connecticut: Ernest Cady (Democratic)
- Lieutenant Governor of Idaho: F. B. Willis (Republican)
- Lieutenant Governor of Illinois: Joseph B. Gill (Democratic)
- Lieutenant Governor of Indiana: Mortimer Nye (Democratic)
- Lieutenant Governor of Iowa: Samuel L. Bestow (Democratic) (until January 11), Warren S. Dungan (Republican) (starting January 11)
- Lieutenant Governor of Kansas: Percy Daniels (Populist)
- Lieutenant Governor of Kentucky: Mitchell Cary Alford (Democratic)
- Lieutenant Governor of Louisiana: Hiram R. Lott (Democratic)
- Lieutenant Governor of Massachusetts: Roger Wolcott (Republican)
- Lieutenant Governor of Michigan: John Strong (Democratic) (until month and day unknown), J. Wight Giddings (Republican) (starting month and day unknown)
- Lieutenant Governor of Minnesota: Gideon S. Ives (Republican) (until month and day unknown), David M. Clough (Republican) (starting month and day unknown)
- Lieutenant Governor of Mississippi: M. M. Evans (Democratic)
- Lieutenant Governor of Missouri: Stephen Hugh Claycomb (Democratic) (until January 9), John B. O'Meara (Democratic) (starting January 9)
- Lieutenant Governor of Montana: John E. Rickards (Republican) (until month and day unknown), Alexander Campbell Botkin (Republican) (starting month and day unknown)
- Lieutenant Governor of Nebraska: Thomas J. Majors (Republican)
- Lieutenant Governor of Nevada: Joseph Poujade (political party unknown)
- Lieutenant Governor of New York: William F. Sheehan (Democratic) (until end of December 31)
- Lieutenant Governor of North Carolina: vacant (until month and day unknown), Rufus A. Doughton (Democratic) (starting month and day unknown)
- Lieutenant Governor of North Dakota: Elmer D. Wallace (Democratic)
- Lieutenant Governor of Ohio: Andrew L. Harris (Republican)
- Lieutenant Governor of Pennsylvania: Louis Arthur Watres (Republican)
- Lieutenant Governor of Rhode Island: Melville Bull (Republican) (until month and day unknown), Edwin Allen (Republican) (starting month and day unknown)
- Lieutenant Governor of South Carolina: Washington H. Timmerman (Democratic)
- Lieutenant Governor of South Dakota: Charles N. Herreid (Republican)
- Lieutenant Governor of Tennessee: William C. Dismukes (Democratic)
- Lieutenant Governor of Texas: Martin McNulty Crane (Democratic)
- Lieutenant Governor of Vermont: F. Stewart Stranahan (Republican) (until October 4), Zophar M. Mansur (Republican) (starting October 4)
- Lieutenant Governor of Virginia: James Hoge Tyler (Democratic) (until month and day unknown), Robert Craig Kent (Democratic) (starting month and day unknown)
- Lieutenant Governor of Washington: F. H. Luce (Republican)
- Lieutenant Governor of Wisconsin: Charles Jonas (Democratic) (until month and day unknown), vacant (starting month and day unknown)

== Events ==
- January 7 – William Kennedy Dickson receives a patent for motion picture film.
- January 9 – New England Telephone and Telegraph installs the first battery-operated telephone switchboard, in Lexington, Massachusetts.
- February 7 – 5-month Cripple Creek miners' strike of 1894 begins.
- February 9 – Milton S. Hershey establishes the Hershey Chocolate Company in Lancaster, Pennsylvania.
- February 17 – Outlaw John Wesley Hardin is released from prison.
- March 12 – Coca-Cola is sold in bottles for the first time.
- March 25 – Coxey's Army, the first significant American protest march, departs from Massillon, Ohio for Washington, D.C.
- April 21 – A bituminous coal miners' strike closes mines across the central US.
- May 1
  - Coxey's Army arrives in Washington, D.C.
  - The May Day Riots of 1894 break out in Cleveland, Ohio.
- May 11 – Pullman Strike: Three thousand Pullman Palace Car Company workers go on a "wildcat" (without union approval) strike to protest lowered wages without an equivalent reduction in expenses charged in the company town of Pullman, Chicago.
- June 6 – Cripple Creek miners' strike of 1894: Governor Davis Hanson Waite orders the Colorado state militia to protect and support the striking miners.
- July – A fire at the site of the 1893 World's Columbian Exposition in Chicago destroys most of the remaining buildings.
- July 4 – The short-lived Republic of Hawaii is proclaimed by Sanford B. Dole.
- August 6 – William C. Oates is elected the 29th governor of Alabama defeating Reuben Kolb.
- September 1 – Great Hinckley Fire: A forest fire in Hinckley, Minnesota kills more than 450 people.
- September 4 – In New York City, 12,000 tailors strike against sweatshop working conditions.
- October 3 – Pomfret School is founded in Connecticut.
- November 1 – The first issue of Billboard magazine is published in Cincinnati, Ohio by William Donaldson and James Hennegan. Initially, it covers the advertising and bill posting industry, and is at the time known as Billboard Advertising.
- November 5 – West Palm Beach, Florida is incorporated as a city.
- November 6 – Republican win by a landslide in the House of Representatives elections, which sets the stage for the decisive 1896 presidential election.
- December 1 – William C. Oates is sworn in as the 29th governor of Alabama replacing Thomas G. Jones.
- December 6 – Kate Chopin's feminist short story "The Story of an Hour" is first published, in the magazine Vogue.

=== Undated ===
- Oil is discovered on the Osage Indian reservation, making the Osage the "richest group of people in the world".
- The Society of Beaux-Arts Architects is founded.
- The National Society of Pershing Rifles is founded at the University of Nebraska-Lincoln.
- Chatham Episcopal Institute (modern-day Chatham Hall) is founded as a girls' college-preparatory boarding school in Chatham, Virginia.
- Frederick W. Tamblyn founds Tamblyn Studio & School of Penmanship which later becomes Ziller of Kansas City, the oldest calligraphy studio in the U.S.
- National Civic League established.
- New York Giants defeat Baltimore Orioles 4 games to 0 to win the First Temple Cup in the National League of Professional Baseball Clubs.

=== Ongoing ===
- Gilded Age (1869–c. 1896)
- Gay Nineties (1890–1899)
- Progressive Era (1890s–1920s)
- Panic of 1893 (1893–1894)

== Births ==
- January 2 – Robert Nathan, poet and novelist (died 1985)
- January 11 – Alexander Hall, film director, film editor and theater actor (died 1968)
- January 20 – Walter Piston, composer (died 1976)
- January 31
  - Percy Helton, screen actor (died 1971)
  - Isham Jones, bandleader and composer (died 1956)
- February 1
  - John Ford, film director (died 1973)
  - Dick Merrill, aviation pioneer (died 1982)
- February 3 – Norman Rockwell, painter and illustrator (died 1978)
- February 14 – Jack Benny, actor and comedian (died 1974)
- February 18 – Paul Williams, architect (died 1980)
- February 22 – Enid Markey, actress (died 1981)
- February 25 – Frank P. Briggs, U.S. Senator from Missouri from 1945 to 1947 (died 1992)
- February 28 – Ben Hecht, playwright and film writer (died 1964)
- March 14 – Osa Johnson (née Leighty), adventurer and filmmaker, wife of Martin Johnson (died 1953)
- March 17 – Paul Green, playwright (died 1981)
- March 19 – Moms Mabley, African American comedian (died 1975)
- March 31 – Francis T. Maloney, U.S. Senator from Connecticut from 1935 to 1945 (died 1945)
- April 3 – Dooley Wilson, African American pianist and singer (died 1953)
- April 15 – Bessie Smith, African American blues singer (died 1937)
- April 19 – Elizabeth Dilling, right-wing political activist (died 1966)
- May 2 – Norma Talmadge, silent film actress (died 1957)
- May 5 – August Dvorak, educational psychologist (died 1975)
- May 11 – Martha Graham, dancer and choreographer (died 1991)
- May 15 – Eddie Stumpf, baseball player (died 1978)
- May 16 – Walter Yust, encyclopædia editor (died 1960)
- May 27 – Dashiell Hammett, detective fiction writer (died 1961)
- May 31 – Fred Allen, comedian (died 1956)
- June 5 – James Glenn Beall, U.S. Senator from Maryland from 1953 to 1965 (died 1971)
- June 23 – Alfred Kinsey, biologist, professor of entomology and zoology and sexologist, founder of the Institute for Sex Research at Indiana University (Bloomington) in 1947 (died 1956)
- June 28 – Arthur Dewey Struble, admiral (died 1983)
- July 9 – Phelps Putnam, poet (died 1948)
- July 20 – Wiley Rutledge, jurist (died 1949)
- July 26 – Aldous Huxley, philosopher and author of Brave New World (died 1963)
- August 3 – Harry Heilmann, baseball player (died 1951)
- August 12 – Dick Calkins, comic book writer (Buck Rogers) (died 1962)
- August 16 – George Meany, labor leader (died 1980)
- August 29 – Henry Dworshak, U.S. Senator from Idaho from 1946 to 1949 and from 1949 to 1962 (died 1962)
- September 6 – Howard Pease, adventure novelist (died 1974)
- September 7 – George Waggner, film director, producer and actor (died 1984)
- September 12 – Billy Gilbert, comedian and actor (died 1971)
- September 19 – Rachel Field, author and poet (died 1942)
- September 24 – Harry B. Liversedge, general (died 1951)
- September 25 – J. Mayo Williams, African American blues music producer (died 1980])
- September 26 – Vaughn De Leath, crooner, "The Original Radio Girl" (died 1943)
- October 2 – Thomas L. Sprague, admiral (died 1972)
- October 4 – Patrick V. McNamara, U.S. Senator from Michigan from 1955 to 1966 (died 1966)
- October 7 – Del Lord, film director (died 1970)
- October 9 – Ernest McFarland, U.S. Senator from Arizona from 1941 to 1953 (died 1984)
- October 14 – E. E. Cummings, poet and painter (died 1962)
- October 18 – H. L. Davis, fiction writer (died 1960)
- November 5
  - Jan Garber, jazz bandleader (died 1977)
  - Beardsley Ruml, economist and tax plan author (died 1960)
- November 8 – Claude Beck, cardiac surgeon (died 1971)
- November 23 – Andrew Frank Schoeppel, U.S. Senator from Kansas from 1949 to 1962 (died 1962)
- November 26 – Norbert Wiener, mathematician (died 1964)
- November 28 – Henry Hazlitt, journalist and economist (died 1993)
- December 5 – Philip K. Wrigley, business and sports executive (died 1977)
- December 8
  - E. C. Segar, cartoonist, creator of Popeye (died 1938)
  - James Thurber, cartoonist and humorous writer (died 1961)
- December 15 – Felix Stump, admiral (died 1972)
- December 17 – Arthur Fiedler, orchestral conductor (died 1979)
- December 26 – Jean Toomer (Nathan Eugene Pinchback Toomer), African American poet and novelist (died 1967)
- December 29 – J. Lister Hill, U.S. Senator from Alabama from 1938 to 1969 (died 1984)

== Deaths ==
- January 15 – Henry Mower Rice, U.S. Senator from Minnesota from 1858 to 1863 (born 1816)
- February 4 – Morton S. Wilkinson, U.S. Senator from Minnesota from 1859 to 1865 (born 1819)
- February 28 – James W. McDill, U.S. Senator from Iowa from 1881 to 1883 (born 1834)
- March 2
  - Jubal Early, Confederate general (born 1816)
  - William H. Osborn, railroad tycoon (born 1820)
- March 3 – Ned Williamson, baseball player (born 1857)
- March 26 – Alfred H. Colquitt, U.S. Senator from Georgia from 1883 to 1894 (born 1824)
- March 28 – George Ticknor Curtis, author, lawyer and historian (born 1812)
- April 7 – Benjamin Franklin King Jr., poet and humorist (born 1857)
- April 14 – Zebulon Baird Vance, Confederate military officer in the American Civil War, the 37th and 43rd Governor of North Carolina, U.S. Senator (born 1830)
- April 15 – James Harvey, U.S. Senator from Kansas from 1874 to 1877 (born 1833)
- April 30 – Francis B. Stockbridge, U.S. Senator from Michigan from 1887 to 1894 (born 1826)
- June 17 – William Hart, landscape painter (born 1823 in Scotland)
- June 20 – Bishop W. Perkins, U.S. Senator from Kansas from 1892 to 1893 (born 1841)
- June 24 – George Peter Alexander Healy, American portrait painter (born 1813)
- July 19 – William B. Avery, Union Army soldier and Medal of Honor recipient (born 1840)
- August 15 – Arthur Rotch, architect (born 1850)
- October 7 – Oliver Wendell Holmes Sr., physician and writer (born 1809)
- October 15 – Macon Bolling Allen, first African American to become a lawyer, argue before a jury, and hold a judicial position in the United States (born 1816).
- October 18 – William F. Raynolds, military engineer (born 1820)
- September 1
  - Boston Corbett, England-born Union Army soldier who shot and killed Abraham Lincoln's assassin, John Wilkes Booth (born 1832)
  - Samuel J. Kirkwood, U.S. Senator from Iowa from 1881 to 1882 (born 1813)
- November 30 – Joseph E. Brown, U.S. Senator from Georgia from 1880 to 1891 (born 1821)
- December 19 – James L. Alcorn, U.S. Senator from Mississippi from 1871 to 1877 (born 1816)

== See also ==
- List of American films of the 1890s
- Timeline of United States history (1860–1899)
