= 1819 in the United States =

- Decades: 1790s; 1800s; 1810s; 1820s; 1830s
- See also: History of the United States (1789–1849); Timeline of United States history (1790–1819); List of years in the United States

Events from the year 1819 in the United States.

== Incumbents ==
=== Federal government ===
- President: James Monroe (DR-Virginia)
- Vice President: Daniel D. Tompkins (DR-New York)
- Chief Justice: John Marshall (Virginia)
- Speaker of the House of Representatives: Henry Clay (DR-Kentucky)
- Congress: 15th (until March 4), 16th (starting March 4)

==== State governments ====
Governors and lieutenant governors

=== Governors ===
- Governor of Alabama: William Wyatt Bibb (Democratic-Republican) (starting December 14)
- Governor of Connecticut: Oliver Wolcott Jr. (Toleration)
- Governor of Delaware: John Clark (Federalist)
- Governor of Georgia:
  - until October 24: William Rabun (Democratic-Republican)
  - October 24-November 5: Matthew Talbot (Democratic-Republican)
  - starting November 5: John Clark (Democratic-Republican)
- Governor of Illinois: Shadrach Bond (Independent)
- Governor of Indiana: Jonathan Jennings (Democratic-Republican)
- Governor of Kentucky: Gabriel Slaughter (Democratic-Republican)
- Governor of Louisiana: Jacques Villeré (Democratic-Republican)
- Governor of Maryland:
  - until January 8: Charles Carnan Ridgely (Federalist)
  - January 8-December 20: Charles Goldsborough (Federalist)
  - starting December 20: Samuel Sprigg (Democratic)
- Governor of Massachusetts: John Brooks (Federalist)
- Governor of Mississippi: David Holmes (Democratic-Republican)
- Governor of New Hampshire: William Plumer (Democratic-Republican) (until June 3), Samuel Bell (Democratic-Republican) (starting June 3)
- Governor of New Jersey: Isaac Halstead Williamson (Federalist)
- Governor of New York: DeWitt Clinton (Democratic-Republican)
- Governor of North Carolina: John Branch (Democratic-Republican)
- Governor of Ohio: Ethan Allen Brown (Democratic-Republican)
- Governor of Pennsylvania: William Findlay (Democratic-Republican)
- Governor of Rhode Island: Nehemiah R. Knight (Democratic-Republican)
- Governor of South Carolina: John Geddes (Democratic-Republican)
- Governor of Tennessee: Joseph McMinn (Democratic-Republican)
- Governor of Vermont: Jonas Galusha (Democratic-Republican)
- Governor of Virginia: James Patton Preston (Democratic-Republican) (until December 1), Thomas Mann Randolph Jr. (Democratic-Republican) (starting December 1)

=== Lieutenant governors ===
- Lieutenant Governor of Connecticut: Jonathan Ingersoll (Democratic-Republican)
- Lieutenant Governor of Illinois: Pierre Menard (Democratic-Republican)
- Lieutenant Governor of Indiana: vacant (until December 8), Ratliff Boon (Democratic-Republican) (starting December 8)
- Lieutenant Governor of Kentucky: vacant
- Lieutenant Governor of Massachusetts: William Phillips Jr. (political party unknown)
- Lieutenant Governor of Mississippi: Duncan Stewart (no political party)
- Lieutenant Governor of New York: John Tayler (Democratic-Republican)
- Lieutenant Governor of Rhode Island: Edward Wilcox (political party unknown)
- Lieutenant Governor of South Carolina: William Youngblood (Democratic-Republican)
- Lieutenant Governor of Vermont: Paul Brigham (Democratic-Republican)

== Events ==
- January 2 – The Panic of 1819, the first major financial crisis in the United States, begins.
- January 25 – Thomas Jefferson founds the University of Virginia.
- January 30 – Romney Literary Society established as the Polemic Society of Romney, West Virginia.
- February 2 – The Supreme Court under John Marshall rules in favor of Dartmouth College in the famous Dartmouth College v. Woodward case, allowing Dartmouth to keep its charter and remain a private institution.
- February 15 – The United States House of Representatives agrees to the Tallmadge Amendment barring slaves from the new state of Missouri (the opening vote in a controversy that leads to the Missouri Compromise).
- February 22 – Spain cedes Florida to the United States by the Adams–Onís Treaty signed in Washington, D.C. (effective 2 years hence).
- March 1 – The U.S. naval vessel USS Columbus is launched in Washington, D.C.
- March 2 – Arkansas Territory is created.
- March 6 – McCulloch v. Maryland: The U.S. Supreme Court rules that the Bank of the United States is constitutional.
- May 22 – The SS Savannah leaves port at Savannah, Georgia on a voyage to become the first steamship to cross the Atlantic Ocean. The ship arrives at Liverpool, England on June 20.
- June 22 – In Nacogdoches, Texas, Dr James Long and his force of 195 men declares a new government, with Long as President and a 21-member Supreme Council.
- June 23 – James Long issues a Declaration of Independence for his "Republic of Texas" (known as the Long Republic to avoid confusion with the later Republic of Texas); the document is based on the United States Declaration of Independence and cites grievances including "Spanish rapacity" and "Odious tyranny", promising Religious freedom, Freedom of the Press and Free trade.

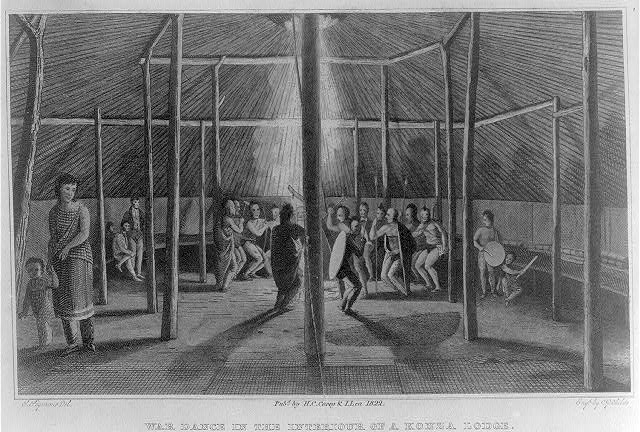
Samuel Seymour's 1819 illustration of a Kansa war dance

- July 4 – Arkansas Territory is effective.
- July 30 – At Edwardsville, Illinois, the United States concludes a treaty with the Kickapoo tribe, receiving their lands in return for their relocation to Missouri.
- August 6 – Norwich University is founded by Captain Alden Partridge in Vermont as the first private military school in the United States.
- August 24 – Samuel Seymour sketches a Kansa lodge and war dance at the present location of Manhattan, Kansas, while part of Stephen Harriman Long's exploring party. This work is now the oldest drawing known to be made in the state of Kansas.
- September 8 – The Balloon Riot occurs in the U.S. at Vauxhall Garden in Philadelphia after guards beat a boy unconscious when he attempts to avoid buying a ticket. Crowds break down the fence and rip the hot air balloon to pieces.
- September 21 – William W. Bibb is elected the first governor of Alabama defeating Marmaduke Williams.
- October – The ʻAi Noa movement assumes power in Hawaii.
- November 3 – The USS Congress, commanded by Captain John D. Henley, becomes the first U.S. warship to visit China, landing at Lintin Island off of the coast of Canton.
- November 9 – William W. Bibb is sworn in as the first governor of Alabama replacing himself as the only governor of the Alabama Territory.
- December 14 – Alabama is admitted as the 22nd U.S. state (see History of Alabama).
- The African Slave Trade Patrol is founded to stop the slave trade on the coast of West Africa.

=== Ongoing ===
- Era of Good Feelings (1817–1825)

== Births ==
- January 3 – Thomas H. Watts, 18th Governor of Alabama, 3rd Confederate States Attorney General (died 1892)
- January 14 – Frederick Steele, army officer (died 1868)
- January 22 – Morton S. Wilkinson, U.S. Senator from Minnesota from 1859 to 1865 (died 1894)
- February 12 – William Wetmore Story, sculptor, art critic, poet and editor (died 1895)
- February 22 – James Russell Lowell, poet (died 1891)
- February 23 – George S. Cook, prominent early photographer (died 1902)
- March 29 – Edwin Drake, first American to drill for oil successfully (died 1880)
- April 11 – Margaret Lea Houston, First Lady of the Republic of Texas (died 1867)
- June 29 – Thomas Dunn English, politician and poet (died 1902)
- June 30 – William A. Wheeler, 19th vice president of the United States from 1877 to 1881 (died 1887)
- July 17 – Eunice Newton Foote, physicist and women's rights campaigner (died 1888)
- July 24 – Josiah Gilbert Holland, novelist and poet (died 1881)
- July 26 – Justin Holland, classical guitarist and civil rights activist (died 1887)
- May 27 – Julia Ward Howe, poet and abolitionist (died 1910)
- May 28 – William Birney, Union Army general, abolitionist, attorney and writer (died 1907)
- May 31 – Walt Whitman, poet, essayist and journalist (died 1892)
- August 1 – Herman Melville, novelist, short story writer and poet (died 1891)
- August 9 – William T. G. Morton, pioneer of anesthesia (died 1868)
- August 29 – Joseph E. McDonald, U.S. Senator from Indiana from 1875 to 1881 (died 1891)
- September 7 – Thomas A. Hendricks, U.S. Senator from Indiana from 1863 to 1869 and 21st vice president of the United States from March to November 1885 (died 1885)
- September 14 – Henry Jackson Hunt, Chief of Artillery in the Army of the Potomac during the American Civil War (died 1889)
- October 2 – Théonie Rivière Mignot, restaurateur (died 1875)
- December 26 – E. D. E. N. Southworth, née Emma Nevitte, novelist (died 1899)
- Mary Jane Richardson Jones, abolitionist (died 1909)

== Deaths ==
- February 5 – Hannah Van Buren, wife of Martin Van Buren, 8th president of the U.S. (born 1783)
- March 8 – Benjamin Ruggles Woodbridge, doctor and Massachusetts militia commander (born 1739)
- April 15 – Oliver Evans, inventor and pioneer in the fields of automation and steam power (born 1755)
- May 22 – Hugh Williamson, Founding Father (born 1735)
- July 1 – the Public Universal Friend, preacher (born 1754)
- July 4 – Prince Greene, formerly enslaved Continental Army soldier, and musician of Rhode Island
- August 23 – Oliver Hazard Perry, naval officer (born 1785)
- September 18 – John Langdon, Founding Father (born 1741)
- October 7 – William Samuel Johnson, Founding Father (born 1727)
- November 7 – Caleb Strong, lawyer and politician, 6th and 10th Governor of Massachusetts (born 1745)
- November 9 – Simon Snyder, politician (born 1759)
- n.d. – Tahlonteeskee, chief and one of the Old Settlers, Cherokee Nation—West, Arkansas Territory
