= 1816 in the United States =

- Decades: 1790s; 1800s; 1810s; 1820s; 1830s
- See also: History of the United States (1789–1849); Timeline of United States history (1790–1819); List of years in the United States

Events from the year 1816 in the United States.

== Incumbents ==
=== Federal government ===
- President: James Madison (DR-Virginia)
- Vice President: vacant
- Chief Justice: John Marshall (Virginia)
- Speaker of the House of Representatives: Henry Clay (DR-Kentucky)
- Congress: 14th

==== State governments ====
Governors and lieutenant governors

=== Governors ===
- Governor of Connecticut: John Cotton Smith (Federalist)
- Governor of Delaware: Daniel Rodney (Federalist)
- Governor of Georgia: David Brydie Mitchell (Democratic-Republican)
- Governor of Indiana: Thomas Posey (Democratic-Republican) (until December 11), Jonathan Jennings (Democratic-Republican) (starting December 11)
- Governor of Kentucky:
  - until September 5: Isaac Shelby (Democratic-Republican)
  - September 5-October 14: George Madison (Democratic-Republican)
  - starting October 14: Gabriel Slaughter (Democratic-Republican)
- Governor of Louisiana: William C. C. Claiborne (Democratic-Republican) (until December 16), Jacques Villeré (Democratic-Republican) (starting December 16)
- Governor of Maryland: Levin Winder (Federalist) (until January 2), Charles Carnan Ridgely (Federalist) (starting January 2)
- Governor of Massachusetts: Caleb Strong (Federalist) (until May 30), John Brooks (Federalist) (starting May 30)
- Governor of New Hampshire: John Taylor Gilman (Federalist) (until June 6), William Plumer (Democratic-Republican) (starting June 6)
- Governor of New Jersey: Mahlon Dickerson (Democratic-Republican)
- Governor of New York: Daniel D. Tompkins (Democratic-Republican)
- Governor of North Carolina: William Miller (Democratic-Republican)
- Governor of Ohio: Thomas Worthington (Democratic-Republican)
- Governor of Pennsylvania: Simon Snyder (Democratic-Republican)
- Governor of Rhode Island: William Jones (Federalist)
- Governor of South Carolina: David Rogerson Williams (Democratic-Republican) (until December 10), Andrew Pickens (Democratic-Republican) (starting December 10)
- Governor of Tennessee: Joseph McMinn (Democratic-Republican)
- Governor of Vermont: Jonas Galusha (Democratic-Republican)
- Governor of Virginia: Wilson Cary Nicholas (Democratic-Republican) (until December 1), James Patton Preston (Democratic-Republican) (starting December 1)

=== Lieutenant governors ===
- Lieutenant Governor of Connecticut: vacant (until month and day unknown), Jonathan Ingersoll (Democratic-Republican) (starting month and day unknown)
- Lieutenant Governor of Indiana: Christopher Harrison (Democratic-Republican) (starting December 11)
- Lieutenant Governor of Kentucky:
  - until month and day unknown: Richard Hickman (political party unknown)
  - month and day unknown: Gabriel Slaughter (political party unknown)
  - starting month and day unknown: vacant
- Lieutenant Governor of Massachusetts: William Phillips, Jr. (political party unknown)
- Lieutenant Governor of New York: DeWitt Clinton (Democratic-Republican)
- Lieutenant Governor of Rhode Island: Simeon Martin (political party unknown) (until month and day unknown), Jeremiah Thurston (political party unknown) (starting month and day unknown)
- Lieutenant Governor of South Carolina: Robert Creswell (Democratic-Republican) (until month and day unknown), John A. Cuthbert (Democratic-Republican) (starting month and day unknown)
- Lieutenant Governor of Vermont: Paul Brigham (Democratic-Republican)

== Events ==
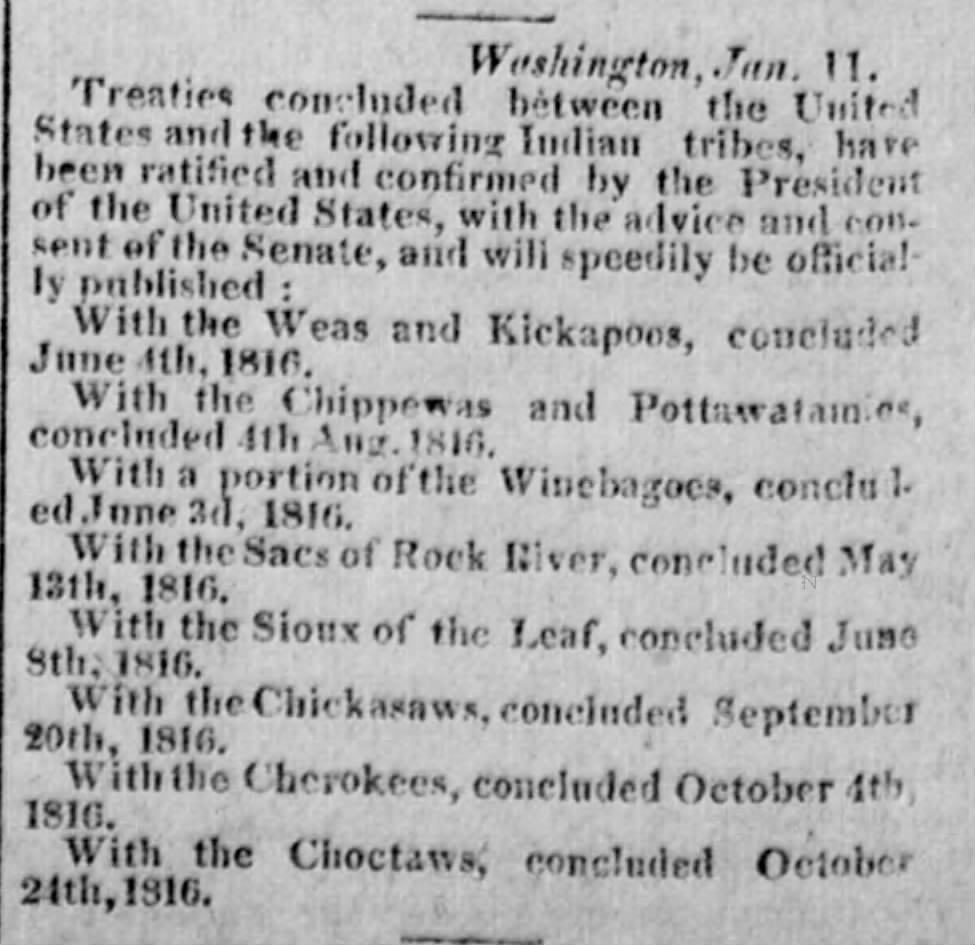
"Treaties Concluded" Richmond Enquirer, January 14, 1817

- April 11 – In Philadelphia, the African Methodist Episcopal Church is established by Richard Allen and other African-American Methodists, the first such denomination completely independent of White churches.
- April 27 – The Dallas tariff is passed in Congress seeking to protect American manufacturing against an influx of cheaper British goods following the War of 1812.
- May 11 – The American Bible Society is founded in New York City, New York.
- June – Fort Dearborn is reestablished in the place that will become Chicago, Illinois.
- July 27 – U.S. forces destroy the Negro Fort in Spanish Florida.
- August 24 – The Treaty of St. Louis is signed in St. Louis, Missouri.
- November – James Monroe defeats Rufus King in the 1816 United States presidential election.
- November 7 – Jonathan Jennings is sworn in as the first governor of Indiana.
- December 11 – Indiana is admitted as the 19th U.S. state (see History of Indiana).

=== Undated ===
- 1816 was known as 'the year without a summer' in North America and elsewhere, with widespread unseasonal weather and crop failures.
- The Second Bank of the United States obtains its charter.
- E. Remington and Sons (the firearm and later typewriter manufacturing company) is founded in Ilion, New York.
- George Bourne, possibly the first immediate and total U.S. abolitionist, publishes The Book and Slavery Irreconcilable.

== Births ==
- January 3 – Samuel C. Pomeroy, U.S. Senator from Kansas from 1861 to 1873 and railroad president (died 1891)
- January 30 – Nathaniel P. Banks, politician and general (died 1894)
- March 1 – John Souther, mechanical engineer (died 1911)
- March 14 – William Marsh Rice, university founder (died 1900)
- April 25 – Eliza Daniel Stewart, temperance leader (died 1908)
- May 3 – Montgomery C. Meigs, career United States Army officer and civil engineer, who served as Quartermaster General of the United States Army during and after the American Civil War (died 1892)
- June 19 – William Henry Webb, industrialist and philanthropist (died 1899)
- July 4 – James B. Howell, U.S. Senator from Iowa from 1870 to 1871 (died 1880)
- July 23 – Charlotte Cushman, actress (died 1876)
- July 31 – George Henry Thomas, U.S. Army general (died 1870)
- August 4
  - William Julian Albert, Congressman (died 1879)
  - Russell Sage, financier, railroad president and politician (died 1906)
- October 11 – William W. Eaton, U.S. Senator from Connecticut from 1875 to 1881 (died 1898)
- October 20 – James W. Grimes, U.S. Senator from Iowa from 1859 to 1869 (died 1872)
- October 26 – Philip Pendleton Cooke, lawyer and poet (died 1850)
- November 3 – Jubal Early, Confederate general (died 1894)
- November 4 – James L. Alcorn, U.S. Senator from Mississippi from 1871 to 1877 (died 1894)
- November 29
  - Henry Mower Rice, U.S. Senator from Minnesota from 1858 to 1863 (died 1894)
  - Morrison Waite, 7th Chief Justice of the Supreme Court (died 1888)
- December 12 – Thomas C. McCreery, U.S. Senator from Kentucky from 1868 to 1871 (died 1890)
- December 13 – Clement Claiborne Clay, U.S. Senator from Alabama from 1853 to 1862, Confederate States Senator from Alabama from 1862 to 1864 (died 1882)

== Deaths ==
- April 3 – Thomas Machin, military engineer (born 1744 in Great Britain)
- May 4 – Samuel Dexter, 3rd United States Secretary of the Treasury, 4th United States Secretary of War (born 1761)
- June 25 – Hugh Henry Brackenridge, writer and Pennsylvania Supreme Court justice (born 1748 in Great Britain)
- August 12 – Mary Katherine Goddard, publisher and postmistress (born 1738)
- September 18 – Bernard McMahon, horticulturalist (born c. 1775 in Ireland)
- November 8 – Gouverneur Morris, statesman and Founding Father of the U.S. (born 1752)

== See also ==
- Timeline of United States history (1790–1819)
