= Gwen Knapp =

American sports journalist (1961–2023)

- Born: Mary Gwen Knapp; November 18, 1961; Wilmington, Delaware, U.S.
- Died: January 20, 2023 (aged 61); Manhattan, New York City, U.S.
- Education: Harvard University
- Occupation: Sports journalist

Mary Gwen Knapp (November 18, 1961 – January 20, 2023) was an American sports journalist. During her career as sportswriter, she wrote for newspapers including The Philadelphia Inquirer, the San Francisco Examiner, the San Francisco Chronicle, and The New York Times. She also wrote for the Sports on Earth website. As one of the few female sports columnists at major metropolitan newspapers in the 1990s, Knapp developed a national reputation for going beyond the headlines to explore issues such as drugs, sexism, homophobia, and racism in sports. She was a finalist for numerous sports journalism awards, and won the Associated Press Sports Writers award for column writing in 1998.

== Early life and education ==
Born in Wilmington, Delaware, on November 18, 1961, Gwen was the daughter of Laurence Knapp, a ship pilot, and Eleanor Knapp (née Agnew), director at Hagley Museum and Library. She had three sisters. Her mother was an avid Philadelphia Phillies fan. Gwen Knapp majored in history at Harvard University, where she was a varsity swimmer, and sports editor for The Harvard Crimson, a student newspaper.

== Career ==
Knapp began her journalism career at The News-Journal in Wilmington, Delaware, covering high school sports.

=== The Philadelphia Inquirer ===
In 1985, she moved to The Philadelphia Inquirer, where she stayed for nearly ten years, and covered the Philadelphia Eagles as a beat reporter. One of her most popular articles at the Inquirer was published on July 4, 1993, when she wrote about a historic doubleheader played by the Philadelphia Phillies which finished at 4:40 in the morning, and interviewed the fans, umpires, groundskeepers, and the announcer, in addition to the baseball players.

=== San Francisco Examiner ===
In 1995, Knapp joined the San Francisco Examiner as a sports columnist, despite not having written columns previously, after impressing sports editor Glenn Schwarz, who said it was clear she was "loaded with opinions". At the time, she was one of only a handful of women with that title across newspapers in the U.S. When Tiger Woods won his first major championship, the 1997 Masters Tournament in Augusta, Georgia, she interviewed four African American golfers in their 50s and 60s who watched and celebrated at the Chuck Corica Golf Complex in Alameda, California, about what his victory meant to them.

In 1998, Knapp won two awards in the Associated Press Sports Writers contest, including first place in column writing on topics such as the "anti-gay posturing" of NFL football player Reggie White, and the near-disqualification of Canadian snowboarder and Olympic gold medalist Ross Rebagliati for testing positive for marijuana use. She also won fourth place in the game story category that year, and was a finalist for best feature story.

=== San Francisco Chronicle ===
From 2000 to 2012, Knapp was writing for the San Francisco Chronicle, after the staffs of the Examiner and Chronicle were combined. Noted for her coverage of doping in sports, Knapp was often cited and interviewed by other media outlets on drug-related topics. As early as 2001, Knapp started expressing concern that cyclist Lance Armstrong might be taking performance-enhancing drugs, and drew an angry letter to the editor from Armstrong himself in 2004, denying her allegations. In 2013, Armstrong finally admitted to taking drugs during his seven consecutive Tour de France wins.

Knapp wrote multiple columns on Barry Bonds of the San Francisco Giants and the BALCO scandal, complementing the investigative reporting of her colleagues, Mark Fainaru-Wada and Lance Williams. Her columns criticized the government's handling of his drug tests, and analyzed the ongoing media "obsession" with his pursuit of an all-time home-run record and induction into the National Baseball Hall of Fame, as well as the twist and turns of his legal saga.

In 2009, Knapp was one of the few American sports journalists who commented on tennis star Andy Roddick's decision to boycott the Dubai Tennis Championships and forego defending his title, commending him for taking a stand against the United Arab Emirates government's refusal to grant a visa to Israeli player Shahar Pe'er to play in the women's tournament.

=== Sports on Earth ===
When Sports on Earth, a new venture between USA Today and MLB Advanced Media, launched in 2012, Knapp was one of the nationally recognized writers hired to help with its stated mission to "restore the great tradition of sports writing and great storytelling". In a column in 2014, Knapp criticized the public backlash against sportscaster Erin Andrews, whom CBS Sports and others had suggested had somehow "provoked" an emotional outburst by NFL player Richard Sherman, because she was an attractive woman.

=== The New York Times ===
In 2014, Knapp joined The New York Times as editor, writing for the foreign and national desks before returning to sports as a senior staff editor.

== Other accolades ==
In awarding her "Best Sports Columnist" in 2007, the SF Weekly described Knapp as "a smart, sharp observer of the sporting life", and "that rare breed of columnist who – gasp! – does her own reporting", arguing that her "legwork" made her "one of the country's best".

== Personal life and death ==
Knapp continued to live in San Francisco while writing for Sports on Earth, but later moved to the East Coast to be closer to her family. She died of lymphoma in New York on January 20, 2023, aged 61.
