= William J. Connors =

American politician

William James "Botchy" Connors (July 26, 1891 – June 24, 1961) was an American politician.

== Career ==
Born in Chicago, Illinois, Connors was an active member of the Democratic Party. In 1932, Connors was elected to the Illinois House of Representatives; in 1934, he was elected to the Illinois State Senate, where he served until his death.

== Death ==
Connors died of uremia in Chicago in 1961.
