= 1892 in the United States =

- Decades: 1870s; 1880s; 1890s; 1900s; 1910s
- See also: History of the United States (1865–1918); Timeline of United States history (1860–1899); List of years in the United States

Events from the year 1892 in the United States.

== Incumbents ==
=== Federal government ===
- President: Benjamin Harrison (R-Indiana)
- Vice President: Levi P. Morton (R-New York)
- Chief Justice: Melville Fuller (Illinois)
- Speaker of the House of Representatives: Charles Frederick Crisp (D-Georgia)
- Congress: 52nd

==== State governments ====
Governors and lieutenant governors

=== Governors ===
- Governor of Alabama: Thomas G. Jones (Democratic)
- Governor of Arkansas: James Philip Eagle (Democratic)
- Governor of California: Henry Markham (Republican)
- Governor of Colorado: John Long Routt (Republican)
- Governor of Connecticut: Morgan G. Bulkeley (Republican)
- Governor of Delaware: Robert J. Reynolds (Democratic)
- Governor of Florida: Francis P. Fleming (Democratic)
- Governor of Georgia: William J. Northen (Democratic)
- Governor of Idaho: N. B. Willey (Republican)
- Governor of Illinois: Joseph W. Fifer (Republican)
- Governor of Indiana: Ira Joy Chase (Republican)
- Governor of Iowa: Horace Boies (Democratic)
- Governor of Kansas: Lyman U. Humphrey (Republican)
- Governor of Kentucky: John Y. Brown (Democratic)
- Governor of Louisiana: Francis T. Nicholls (Democratic) (until May 10), Murphy James Foster, Sr. (Democratic) (starting May 10)
- Governor of Maine: Edwin C. Burleigh (Republican)
- Governor of Maryland: Elihu Emory Jackson (Democratic) (until January 13), Frank Brown (Democratic) (starting January 13)
- Governor of Massachusetts: William E. Russell (Democratic)
- Governor of Michigan: Edwin B. Winans (Democratic)
- Governor of Minnesota: William R. Merriam (Republican)
- Governor of Mississippi: John M. Stone (Democratic)
- Governor of Missouri: David R. Francis (Democratic)
- Governor of Montana: Joseph Toole (Democratic)
- Governor of Nebraska: John Milton Thayer (Republican) (until February 8), James E. Boyd (Democratic) (starting February 8)
- Governor of Nevada: Roswell K. Colcord (Republican)
- Governor of New Hampshire: Hiram A. Tuttle (Republican)
- Governor of New Jersey: Leon Abbett (Democratic)
- Governor of New York: Roswell P. Flower (Democratic) (starting January 1)
- Governor of North Carolina: Thomas Michael Holt (Democratic)
- Governor of North Dakota: Andrew H. Burke (Republican)
- Governor of Ohio: James E. Campbell (Democratic) (until January 11), William McKinley (Republican) (starting January 11)
- Governor of Oregon: Sylvester Pennoyer (Democratic)
- Governor of Pennsylvania: Robert E. Pattison (Democratic)
- Governor of Rhode Island: Herbert W. Ladd (Republican) (until May 31), D. Russell Brown (Republican) (starting May 31)
- Governor of South Carolina: Benjamin Ryan Tillman (Democratic)
- Governor of South Dakota: Arthur C. Mellette (Republican)
- Governor of Tennessee: John P. Buchanan (Democratic)
- Governor of Texas: James Stephen Hogg (Democratic)
- Governor of Vermont: Carroll S. Page (Republican) (until October 6), Levi K. Fuller (Republican) (starting October 6)
- Governor of Virginia: Philip W. McKinney (Democratic)
- Governor of Washington: Elisha Peyre Ferry (Republican)
- Governor of West Virginia: Aretas B. Fleming (Democratic)
- Governor of Wisconsin: George W. Peck (Democratic)
- Governor of Wyoming: Amos W. Barber (Republican)

=== Lieutenant governors ===
- Lieutenant Governor of California: John B. Reddick (Republican)
- Lieutenant Governor of Colorado: William Story (Republican)
- Lieutenant Governor of Connecticut: Samuel E. Merwin (Republican)
- Lieutenant Governor of Idaho: John S. Gray (Republican)
- Lieutenant Governor of Illinois: Lyman Ray (Republican)
- Lieutenant Governor of Indiana: Francis M. Griffith (Republican)
- Lieutenant Governor of Iowa: Alfred N. Poyneer (Republican) (until month and day unknown), Samuel L. Bestow (Democratic) (starting month and day unknown)
- Lieutenant Governor of Kansas: Andrew J. Felt (Republican)
- Lieutenant Governor of Kentucky: Mitchell Cary Alford (Democratic)
- Lieutenant Governor of Louisiana: James Jeffries (Democratic) (until month and day unknown), Charles Parlange (Democratic) (starting month and day unknown)
- Lieutenant Governor of Massachusetts: William H. Haile (Republican)
- Lieutenant Governor of Michigan: John Strong (Democratic)
- Lieutenant Governor of Minnesota: Gideon S. Ives (Republican)
- Lieutenant Governor of Mississippi: M. M. Evans (Democratic)
- Lieutenant Governor of Missouri: Stephen Hugh Claycomb (Democratic)
- Lieutenant Governor of Montana: John E. Rickards (Republican)
- Lieutenant Governor of Nebraska: Thomas J. Majors (Republican)
- Lieutenant Governor of Nevada: Joseph Poujade (political party unknown)
- Lieutenant Governor of New York: William F. Sheehan (Democratic) (starting January 1)
- Lieutenant Governor of North Carolina: vacant
- Lieutenant Governor of North Dakota: Roger Allin (Republican)
- Lieutenant Governor of Ohio: William V. Marquis (Republican) (until January 11), Andrew L. Harris (Republican) (starting January 11)
- Lieutenant Governor of Pennsylvania: Louis Arthur Watres (Republican)
- Lieutenant Governor of Rhode Island: Henry A. Stearns (political party unknown) (until May 31), Melville Bull (Republican) (starting May 31)
- Lieutenant Governor of South Carolina: Eugene B. Gary (Democratic)
- Lieutenant Governor of South Dakota: George H. Hoffman (Republican)
- Lieutenant Governor of Tennessee: William C. Dismukes (Democratic)
- Lieutenant Governor of Texas: George Cassety Pendleton (Democratic)
- Lieutenant Governor of Vermont: Henry A. Fletcher (Republican) (until October 6), F. Stewart Stranahan (Republican) (starting October 6)
- Lieutenant Governor of Virginia: James Hoge Tyler (Democratic)
- Lieutenant Governor of Washington: Charles E. Laughton (Republican)
- Lieutenant Governor of Wisconsin: Charles Jonas (Democratic)

== Events ==
=== January–March ===
- January 1 – Ellis Island begins receiving immigrants to the United States.
- January 15 – James Naismith's rules for basketball are published for the first time in the Springfield YMCA International Training School's newspaper, in an article titled "A New Game".
- January 20 – At the YMCA in Springfield, Massachusetts, the first official basketball game is played.
- February 1 – The historic Enterprise Bar and Grill is established in Rico, Colorado.
- February 12 – Former President Abraham Lincoln's birthday is declared a national public holiday in the United States.
- February 18 – Pennsauken Township, New Jersey is incorporated.
- February 23 – The 7.1–7.2 M_{w} Laguna Salada earthquake shakes Southern California and northern Mexico with a maximum Mercalli intensity of VIII (Severe).
- March 15 – Jesse W. Reno patents the first working escalator, used at Old Iron Pier, Coney Island, New York City.

=== April–June ===
- April – The Johnson County War breaks out between small farmers and large ranchers in Wyoming.
- April 15 – The General Electric Company is established through merger of the Thomson-Houston Company and the Edison General Electric Company.
- April 19 – The 6.4 M_{La} Vacaville–Winters earthquake shakes the North Bay are of California with a maximum Mercalli intensity of IX (Violent). This first event in a doublet earthquake results in one death and is followed two days later by a 6.2 M_{La} shock. Total damage from the events is $225,000–250,000.
- April 28 – Redondo Beach, California, is founded.
- April 30 – Lynching of Ephraim Grizzard, an African American, in Nashville, Tennessee.
- May 10 – Glen Ellyn, Illinois is incorporated.
- May 10 – A gas explosion at Mine No. 1 in Roslyn, Washington kills 45 miners, the worst industrial disaster in Washington State history.
- May 11 – The 18th Kentucky Derby is run in Louisville, Kentucky; Azra finishes first, Huron second and Phil Dwyer third in a race with only three horses.
- May 28 – The Sierra Club is organized by John Muir in San Francisco, California.
- June 6 – The Chicago "L" elevated railway opens.
- June 7 – Homer Plessy, who is one-eighth African heritage with light skin, is arrested for sitting (deliberately) on the whites-only car in Louisiana, leading to the landmark Plessy v. Ferguson court case.
- June 30 – The Homestead Strike begins in Homestead, Pennsylvania, culminating in a battle between striking workers and private security agents on July 6.

=== July–September ===
- July 4 – Samoa changes its time zone to being 3 hours behind California, such that it crosses the international date line and July 4 occurs twice.
- July 6 – Homestead Strike: The arrival of a force of 300 Pinkerton detectives from New York City and Chicago results in a fight in which about 10 men are killed.
- August 1 – Thomas G. Jones is reelected the 28th governor of Alabama defeating Reuben Kolb.
- August 4
  - The father and stepmother of Lizzie Borden are found violently murdered in their Fall River, Massachusetts home; she will be acquitted of their murder.
  - Franklin Park, Illinois is incorporated as a village.
- August 9 – Thomas Edison receives a patent for a two-way telegraph.
- August 13 – The Baltimore Afro-American newspaper, the country's longest-running African American family owned newspaper business, publishes its first issue (publisher, John H. Murphy, Sr.).

=== October–December ===
- October 5 – The Dalton Gang, attempting to rob two banks in Coffeyville, Kansas, is shot by the townspeople; only Emmett Dalton, with 23 wounds, survives to spend 14 years in prison.
- October 12 – To mark the 400th anniversary Columbus Day holiday, the "Pledge of Allegiance" is first recited in unison by students in U.S. public schools.
- October 24 – Boston Beaneaters win their Fifth National League Pennant by defeating Cleveland Spiders 5 games to 0.
- November 8
  - 1892 U.S. presidential election: Grover Cleveland is elected over Benjamin Harrison and James B. Weaver to win the second of his non-consecutive terms.
  - The four-day New Orleans General Strike begins.
- November 12 – Pudge Heffelfinger is paid $525 by the Allegheny Athletic Association, becoming the first professional American football player on record.
- December 17 – Vogue magazine launched.

=== Undated ===
- Shredded wheat breakfast cereal first sold to restaurants by Henry Perky.
- Ithaca College founded as Ithaca Conservatory of Music in New York (state) by William Grant Egbert.
- Lowell High School is founded in Lowell, Indiana.
- Aberdeen, Maryland, is founded.
- The Cadet Band (modern-day Highty-Tighties) of the Virginia Agricultural and Mechanical College (modern-day Virginia Tech) is established in the Virginia Tech Corps of Cadets.
- Andrew Carnegie combines all of his separate businesses into the Carnegie Steel Company, allowing him to gain a monopoly in the United States steel industry.

=== Ongoing ===
- Garza Revolution in Texas and Mexico (1891–1893)
- Gilded Age (1869–c. 1896)
- Gay Nineties (1890–1899)
- Progressive Era (1890s–1920s)

== Births ==
- January 9 – Eva Bowring, U.S. Senator from Nebraska in 1954 (died 1985)
- January 14 – Hal Roach, film and television producer, director and actor (died 1992)
- January 16
  - Homer Burton Adkins, chemist (died 1949)
  - Charles W. Ryder, general (died 1960)
  - William A. Stanfill, U.S. Senator from Kentucky from 1945 to 1946 (died 1971)
- January 26 – Zara Cully, actress (died 1978)
- February 19 – Scott W. Lucas, U.S. Senator from Illinois from 1939 to 1951 (died 1968)
- February 29
  - Ed Appleton, baseball player (died 1932)
  - Augusta Savage, African American sculptor (died 1962)
- March 9 – Arthur Caesar, screenwriter (died 1953)
- March 26 – Paul Douglas, U.S. Senator from Illinois from 1949 to 1967 (died 1976)
- April 8 – Rose McConnell Long, U.S. Senator from Louisiana from 1936 to 1937 (died 1970)
- May 5 – Rajarsi Janakananda, millionaire and disciple of Paramahansa Yogananda (died 1955)
- May 10 – Arthur E. Nelson, U.S. Senator from Minnesota from 1942 to 1943 (died 1955)
- May 16 – Osgood Perkins, actor (died 1937)
- May 19 – Pops Foster, jazz bass player (died 1969)
- May 20 – Harry J. Anslinger, 1st Commissioner of the Federal Bureau of Narcotics (died 1975)
- May 24 – Joe Oeschger, baseball pitcher (died 1986)
- June 6 – Donald F. Duncan, Sr., toymaker and businessman, founder of Duncan Toys Company (died 1971)
- June 15 – Wallace Wade, American football coach, University of Alabama, Duke University (died 1986)
- July 4 – Henry M. Mullinnix, admiral (d. 1943)
- July 10 – Spessard Holland, U.S. Senator from Florida from 1946 to 1971 (died 1971)
- July 24 - Alice Ball, American chemist who developed the "Ball Method", for treating leprosy (died 1916)
- July 26 – Sad Sam Jones, baseball player (died 1966)
- July 29 – William Powell, film actor (died 1984)
- August 6 – Edith Achilles, psychologist (died 1989)
- August 16 – Otto Messmer, cartoonist (died 1983)
- August 20 – George Aiken, U.S. Senator from Vermont from 1941 to 1975 (died 1984)
- August 23 – Alexander G. Barry, U.S. Senator from Oregon from 1938 to 1939 (died 1952)
- October 6 – Jackie Saunders, silent film actress (died 1954)
- October 13 – Malcolm McGregor, silent film actor (died 1945)
- October 28 – Dink Johnson, jazz musician (died 1954)
- November 10 – Frank A. Barrett, U.S. Senator from Wyoming from 1953 to 1959 (died 1962)
- December 15 – J. Paul Getty, industrialist (died 1976)

== Deaths ==
- January 2 – Montgomery C. Meigs, career U.S. Army officer and civil engineer, Quartermaster General of the United States Army during and after the American Civil War (born 1816)
- February 28 – Elias Nelson Conway, 5th Governor of Arkansas from 1852 to 1860 (born 1812)
- March 7 - Horace Bonham, American genre painter (born 1835)
- March 26 – Walt Whitman, poet, author of Leaves of Grass (born 1819).
- April 6 – Willard Saulsbury, Sr., U.S. Senator from Delaware from 1873 to 1892 (born 1820)
- May 14 – John S. Barbour, Jr., U.S. Senator from Virginia from 1889 to 1892 (born 1820)
- June 8 – Robert Ford, outlaw, killer of Jesse James (born 1862)
- July 14 – Newton Booth, U.S. Senator from California from 1875 to 1881 (born 1825)
- August 16 – Thomas H. Watts, 18th Governor of Alabama, 3rd Confederate States Attorney General (born 1819)
- September 7 – John Greenleaf Whittier, Quaker poet and abolitionist (born 1807)
- September 23 – John Pope, career U.S. Army officer and Union general in the Civil War (born 1822)
- October 5 – outlaw members of Dalton Gang (shot)
  - Bob Dalton (born 1869)
  - Grat Dalton (born 1861)
- October 18 – William W. Chapman, politician and lawyer (born 1808)
- October 25 – Caroline Harrison, First Lady of the United States as wife of President Benjamin Harrison (born 1832)
- November 29 – Graham N. Fitch, U.S. Senator from Indiana from 1857 to 1861 (born 1809)
- December 2 – Jay Gould, railroad developer and speculator (born 1836)
- December 15 – Randall L. Gibson, U.S. Senator from Louisiana from 1883 to 1892 (born 1832)
- December 31 – Henry P. Baldwin, Governor of Michigan from 1869 to 1873 and U.S. Senator from Michigan from 1879 to 1881 (born 1814)
- Zenas King, bridge builder (born 1818)

== See also ==
- List of American films of the 1890s
- Timeline of United States history (1860–1899)
