= 1895 Rhode Island gubernatorial election =

- April 3, 1895

Nominee	Charles W. Lippitt	George L. Littlefield	Smith Quimby
Party	Republican	Democratic	Prohibition
Popular vote	25,098	14,289	2,624
Percentage	56.89%	32.39%	5.95%
- Lippitt: 40–50% 50–60% 60–70% 70–80% 80-90% Littlefield: 40–50%
Governor before election
Daniel Russell Brown
Republican
Elected Governor
Charles W. Lippitt
Republican

The 1895 Rhode Island gubernatorial election was held on April 3, 1895. Republican nominee Charles W. Lippitt defeated Democratic nominee George L. Littlefield with 56.89% of the vote.

== General election ==
=== Candidates ===
Major party candidates

- Charles W. Lippitt, Republican
- George L. Littlefield, Democratic

Other candidates

- Smith Quimby, Prohibition
- George Boomer, Socialist Labor
- William Foster Jr., People's

=== Results ===
1895 Rhode Island gubernatorial election
Party	Candidate	Votes	%	±%
Republican	Charles W. Lippitt	25,098	56.89%	
Democratic	George L. Littlefield	14,289	32.39%	
Prohibition	Smith Quimby	2,624	5.95%	
Socialist Labor	George Boomer	1,730	3.92%	
Populist	William Foster Jr.	379	0.86%	
Majority		10,809		
Turnout				
Republican hold		Swing		
