= Senator Goff =

Senator Goff may refer to:

== Members of the United States Senate ==
- Guy D. Goff (1866–1933), U.S. Senator from West Virginia from 1925 to 1931
- Nathan Goff Jr. (1843–1920), U.S. Senator from West Virginia from 1913 to 1919

== United States state senate members ==
- Abe Goff (1899–1984), Idaho State Senate
- Darius Goff (1809–1891), Rhode Island State Senate
