= General Holden =

General Holden may refer to:

- Capel Lofft Holden (1856–1937), British Army brigadier general
- John Holden (British Army officer) (1913–1995), British Army major general
- Michael Holden (character), fictional U.S. Army lieutenant general from the Lifetime TV series Army Wives
- Thomas Holden (general) (1741–1823), Rhode Island Militia major general
