= Pitcher-Goff House =

Historic house in Rhode Island, United States

- U.S. National Register of Historic Places
- U.S. Historic district – Contributing property
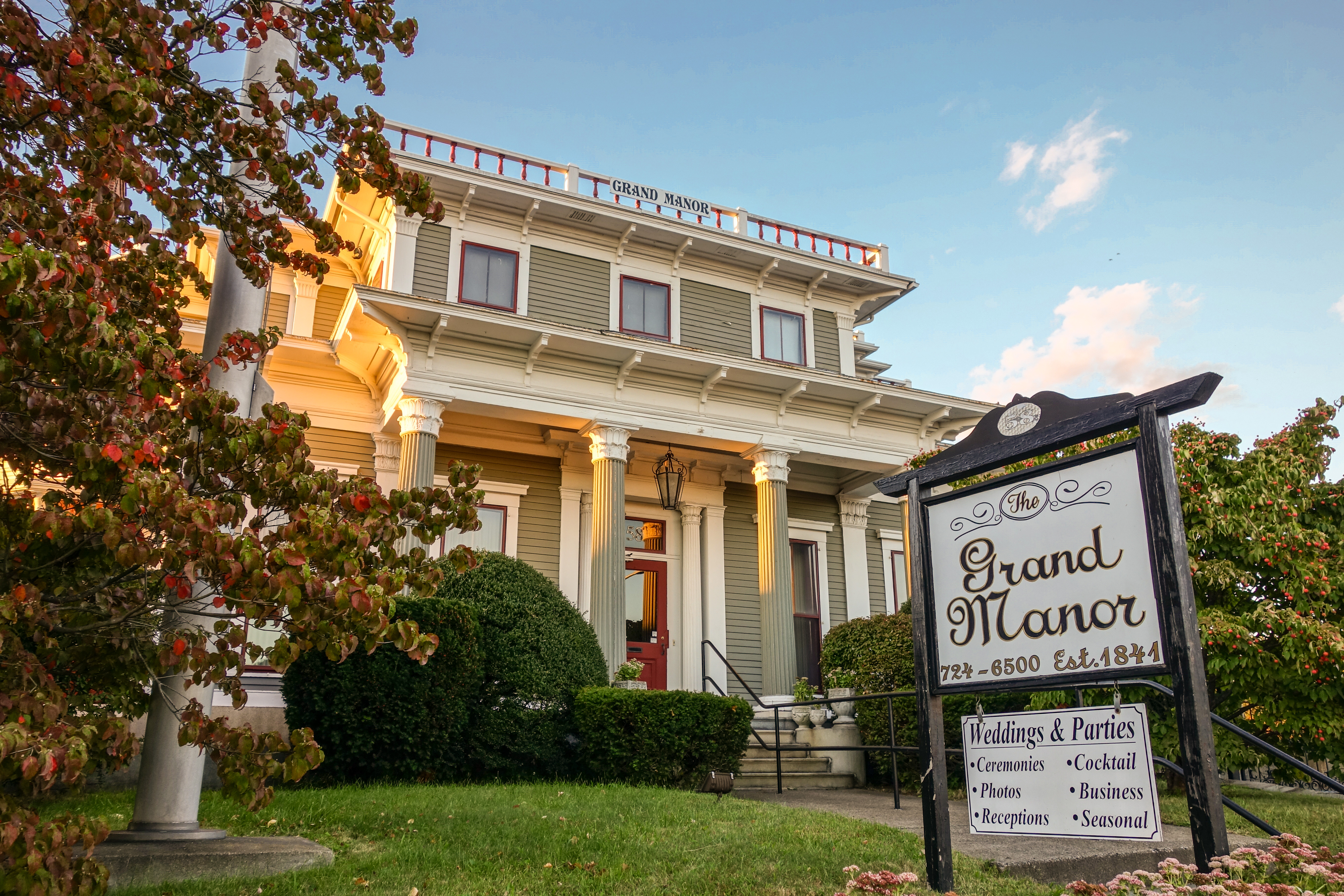
- Pitcher-Goff House was operating as "The Grand Manor" in 2012

- Location within Rhode Island Location within the United States
- Location: 58 Walcott Street, Pawtucket, Rhode Island
- Coordinates: 41°52′37″N 71°22′49″W
- Built: 1840
- Architectural style: Italianate
- Part of: Quality Hill Historic District (ID84002041)
- NRHP reference No.: 76000001

Significant dates
- Added to NRHP: June 24, 1976
- Designated CP: April 13, 1984

The Pitcher-Goff House (formerly known as The Grand Manor), is an historic house at 58 Walcott Street in the Quality Hill neighborhood of Pawtucket, Rhode Island. The house is architecturally eclectic, with a largely Italianate exterior, and a Late Victorian interior. The house was built for Elias B. Pitcher, a cotton textile manufacturer, in 1840. Later it was sold to Lyman B. Goff, another local industrialist, who made significant alterations to the interior, replacing a great deal of the older woodwork with more fashionable Queen Anne styling in 1881. He also modified the exterior, but these changes were largely limited to the porch, which also exhibits fine Queen Anne detailing.

Goff deeded the house to daughter, Elizabeth Goff Wood, in 1922. In 1941 she donated the house to the Pawtucket Congregational Church for use by the local chapter of the American Red Cross. It has since served as a headquarters for the Boy Scouts of America, and in 1970 it was the first location of the Rhode Island Children's Museum. It was added to the National Register of Historic Places in 1976. In the early 2010s, it operated as an event and function space known as The Grand Manor.

The house was purchased by a jewelry maker in 2017, who then departed the property not long after. In February 2020, local preservationists expressed concern that many of the details of the interior had gone missing, including stained glass at the top of the stairs, several chandeliers, and gates. The building was sold again in March 2020 to a local artist and contractor, who stated he appreciates the house as "a valuable part of Pawtucket’s cultural heritage" and intends to restore it as an art studio.

== See also ==
- National Register of Historic Places listings in Pawtucket, Rhode Island
