= 1892 Rhode Island gubernatorial election =

- April 6, 1892

Nominee	Daniel Russell Brown	William T. C. Wardwell
Party	Republican	Democratic
Popular vote	27,461	25,433
Percentage	50.22%	46.51%
- Brown: 40–50% 50–60% 60–70% 80-90% Wardwell: 40–50% 50–60%
Governor before election
Herbert W. Ladd
Republican
Elected Governor
Daniel Russell Brown
Republican

The 1892 Rhode Island gubernatorial election was held on April 6, 1892. Republican nominee Daniel Russell Brown defeated Democratic nominee William T. C. Wardwell with 50.22% of the vote.

== General election ==
=== Candidates ===
Major party candidates

- Daniel Russell Brown, Republican
- William T. C. Wardwell, Democratic

Other candidates

- Alexander Gilbert, Prohibition
- Franklin E. Burton, People's

=== Results ===
1892 Rhode Island gubernatorial election
Party	Candidate	Votes	%	±%
Republican	Daniel Russell Brown	27,461	50.22%	
Democratic	William T. C. Wardwell	25,433	46.51%	
Prohibition	Alexander Gilbert	1,598	2.92%	
Populist	Franklin E. Burton	187	0.34%	
Majority		2,028		
Turnout				
Republican hold		Swing		
