= Daniel Littlefield =

American politician

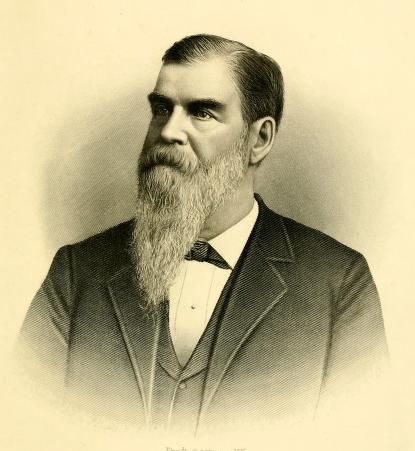
- 1890 sketch of Littlefield

Lieutenant Governor of Rhode Island
- In office 1889–1890
- Governor: Herbert W. Ladd
- Preceded by: Enos Lapham
- Succeeded by: William T. C. Wardwell

Personal details
- Born: November 23, 1822 North Kingstown, Rhode Island, US
- Died: May 31, 1891 (aged 68) Central Falls, Rhode Island, US
- Resting place: Swan Point Cemetery
- Party: Whig; Republican
- Relatives: Alfred H. Littlefield (brother); George L. Littlefield (brother)
- Occupation: Merchant, horsehair manufacturer

Daniel Greene Littlefield (November 23, 1822 – May 31, 1891) was a haircloth mill owner in Central Falls, Rhode Island, and Lieutenant Governor of Rhode Island for one term 1889–1890.

== Early life ==
Littlefield was born on November 23, 1822, in North Kingstown, Rhode Island, but his family moved to Scituate, Rhode Island, when he was young. Starting at age eight, Littlefield worked in the cotton and wollen mills of Scituate, working his way up from bobbin boy to superintendent. From 1846 to 1863, Littlefield lived in Florence, Massachusetts, where he managed various woolen mills and also operated a general store with his brothers George and Alfred. He then relocated to Northampton Center, where he ran a dry goods business. He would later represent the district for two years in the House of Representatives of Massachusetts. Daniel's younger brother Alfred later went on to become Governor of Rhode Island.

== Pawtucket Hair Cloth Company ==
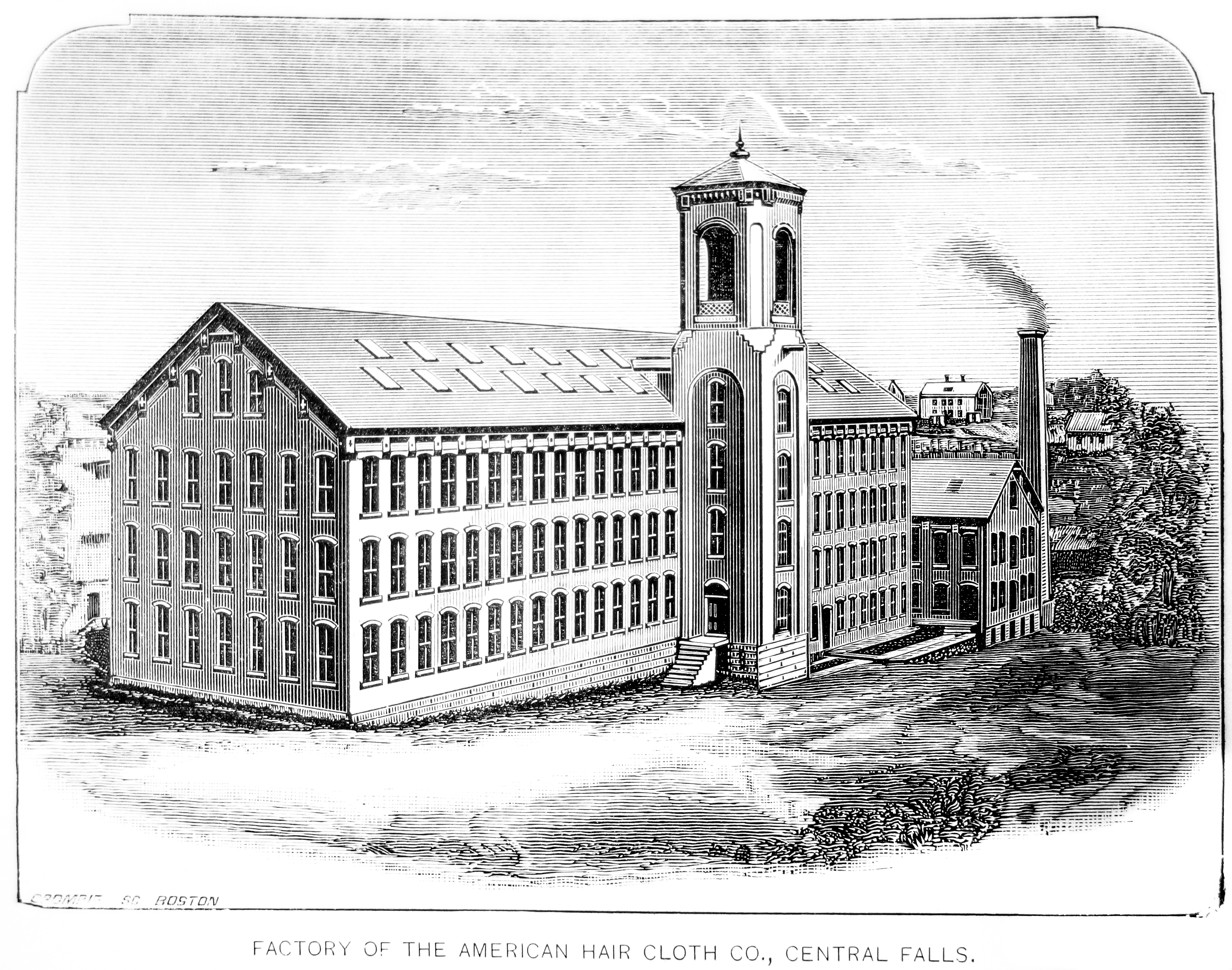
Engraving of the Pawtucket Hair Cloth Co.

In 1863, came the career move that would define the rest of his life: the manufacture of haircloth, which is a stiff fabric made from the hair of a horse's mane or tail. He established the Pawtucket Hair Cloth Company, setting up the factory and placing the equipment. The company previously had small operations but significantly expanded due to the invention by Isaac C. Lindsley of a mechanical loom that could automatically select the single hair from the mass. He had intended to only stay in Rhode Island for a year and return to Massachusetts, but the factory was so profitable that he decided to spend the rest of his life in Central Falls, serving as president of the Pawtucket Hair Cloth Company.

Littlefield traveled extensively in Europe, visiting "all the principal countries" and making a particularly long visit to Southern Russia, the "great horsehair market of the world." During his travels, Littlefield was named honorary commissioner from Rhode Island to the Paris Exposition.

== Political life ==
Littlefield started his political career as a Whig, but joined the Republican Party on its formation. He served in the Massachusetts assembly in 1861 and 1862, and then became Lieutenant Governor of Rhode Island in 1889.

== Personal life ==
In 1843, Littlefield married Maria B. Collins, who was from Natick, Rhode Island. After his wife's death in 1866, he married Maria Antoinette McMurry of New York. He had four daughters by his first wife, only one of whom lived to adulthood, and she died at age 20. He had two children with his second wife, Leland H. and Florence A.

Littlefield was a member and trustee of the Pawtucket Congregational Church. Physically, he was a large and imposing figure at over six feet tall.

Littlefield owned a mansion at Broad and Central Streets in Central Falls that was said to be one of the finest in town. He died in his home on May 31, 1891, aged 68, and was buried at Swan Point Cemetery.

Political offices
Preceded by Enos Lapham	Lieutenant Governor of Rhode Island; 1889–1890	Succeeded by William T. C. Wardwell
