= Central Falls Congregational Church =

Historic church in Rhode Island, United States

- U.S. National Register of Historic Places
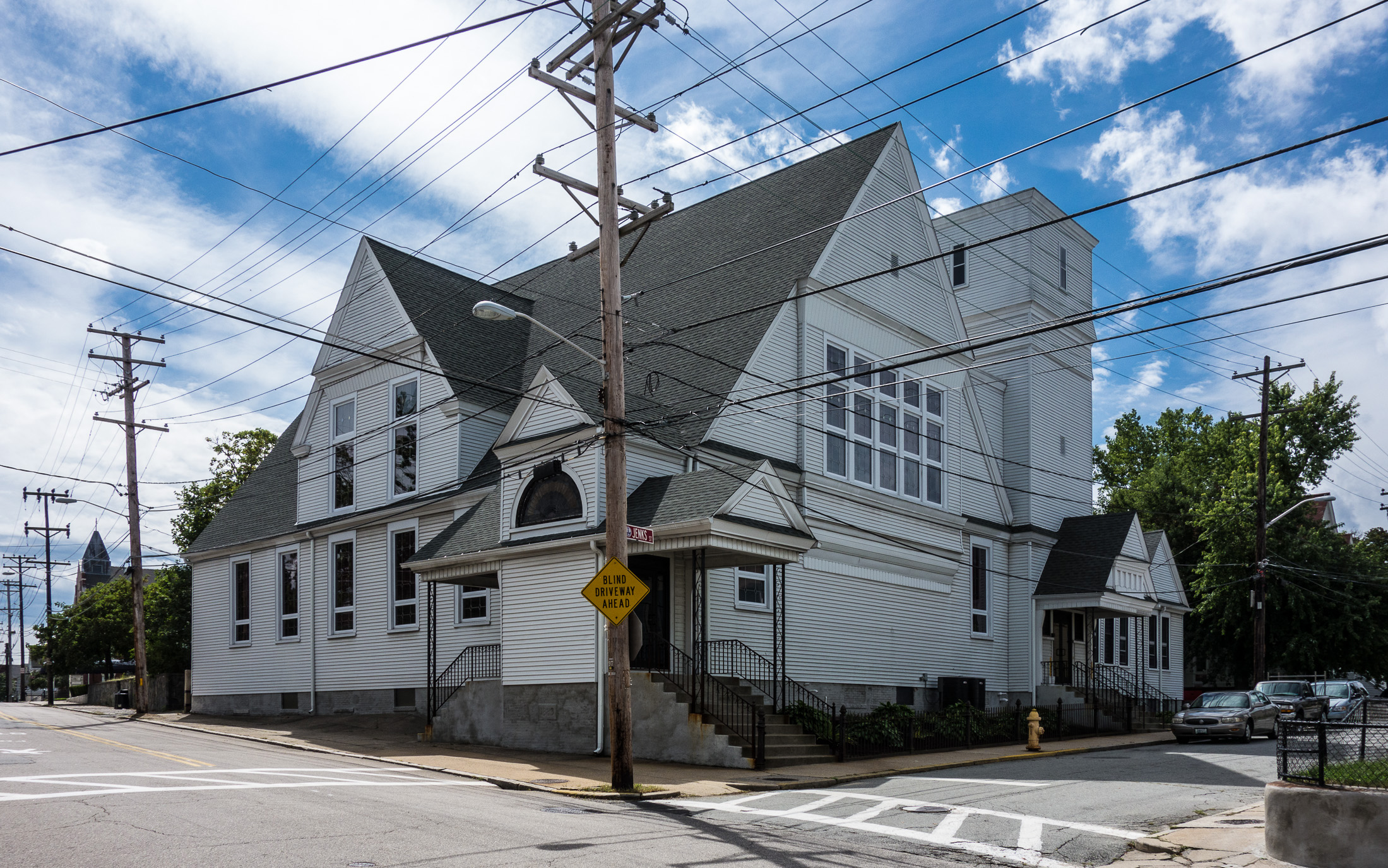
- Central Falls Congregational Church in 2013

- Location within Rhode Island Location within the United States
- Location: 376 High Street, Central Falls, Rhode Island
- Coordinates: 41°53′5″N 71°23′4″W
- Built: 1883–84
- Built by: Cutting & Bishop
- Architectural style: Queen Anne
- MPS: Central Falls MRA (AD)
- NRHP reference No.: 76000042
- Added to NRHP: July 12, 1976

The former Central Falls Congregational Church is a historic church located in Central Falls, Rhode Island. This Queen Anne wood-frame structure was built in 1883–84 to serve a local Congregationalist congregation which was established in 1845 and had outgrown its previous space.

== History and architecture ==
Congregationalists in Central Falls originally attended services at the Pawtucket Congregational Church, which they had helped establish in 1829. As the population of the village grew, it became possible for the local members to organize their own congregation. This was done in 1845 and they dedicated a small church that June. The church building was enlarged in 1868. In the early 1880s the congregation considered building new but did not make any decisions until a parishioner gave a lot on the corner of Jenks and High Streets for a new church. Plans for the building were approved in January 1883 and it was dedicated in April 1884 by Rev. James Harrison Lyon. At the time of its completion the building was described as a "tasteful" example of Queen Anne architecture. In 1978 architectural historian Pamela A. Kennedy, writing for the Rhode Island Historical Preservation Commission, described this choice of style by the church as being "indicative of the wealth and social prominence of its members." The architect has not been identified but the contractors were Cutting & Bishop of Worcester, Massachusetts.

During the nineteenth century, the congregation included many prominent members of the community, especially its manufacturers. One of these, Henry A. Stearns, later served as lieutenant governor of Rhode Island. As time passed, these older Protestant elites moved away and were replaced by new immigrants, especially working-class Catholics. During this time, a group of Polish Catholics built St. Joseph's across High Street on the site of the church's 1845 building. By 1973 the congregation was so reduced that it could not continue. They merged with two Pawtucket congregations and sold the building to St. Joseph's, which has occupied the building as a parish center since that time.

The building was listed on the National Register of Historic Places on July 12, 1976.

== See also ==
- National Register of Historic Places listings in Providence County, Rhode Island
