= Thomas Holden (general) =

American Revolutionary War general and judge

Thomas Holden (June 7, 1741 – February 12, 1823) was a general in the American Revolutionary War and later a justice of the Rhode Island Supreme Court. Holden was born in Warwick, Rhode Island, and was a farmer there. He joined Varnum's Regiment in 1775 as a captain and the following year served with the Rhode Island Brigade. Holden became a Rhode Island militia colonel in 1778 and fought in the Newport Campaign that year. He was elected to the Continental Congress in 1788 and 1789 and promoted to brigadier general in the militia in 1779 and to major general in 1790. Holden served as a justice of the state supreme court from 1797 until 1801.

== Early life ==
Holden was born in Warwick, Rhode Island, on June 7, 1741, and was one of four children of John and Deliverance Greene Holden. He was a farmer and was married to a woman with the first name Freelove; by some modern accounts this was Freelove Barton, though this is disputed because Barton died unmarried. Holden and his wife had twelve children.

== Military career ==
In April 1775 Holden was appointed a captain in Varnum's Regiment, newly raised by the Rhode Island Assembly. On December 31 Varnum's regiment, whose men had enlisted for a fixed term until the end of the year, was disbanded, and Holden was recommended for promotion to major. In October 1776 he was appointed quartermaster to the Rhode Island Brigade. He was elected a captain in the Warwick Alarm Company in April 1778 and the following month commissioned colonel of the 1st Regiment of the Kent County Militia, with which he took part in the Newport Campaign.

Holden was promoted to brigadier general with the militia in June 1779 and served on the 1781 Rhode Island Council of War. In both 1788 and 1789 he was elected a member of the Continental Congress but on neither occasion does he seem to have taken up his seat. Holden received a promotion to the rank of major general in the militia in 1790.

== Legal career and later life ==
Holden was appointed a justice of the Rhode Island Supreme Court in December 1797 and held that position until June 1801. Holden was initially elected to the state supreme court to fill the seat vacated by the resignation of Thomas Tillinghast. Holden was then re-elected to the next two successive terms of the court.

Holden died in Warwick on February 22, 1823, at the age of 82. He was buried in East Natick, Rhode Island, but no stone survives to mark the spot. A descendant has erected a memorial stone at East Greenwich cemetery.
