= Henry A. Stearns =

American politician

Henry Augustus Stearns
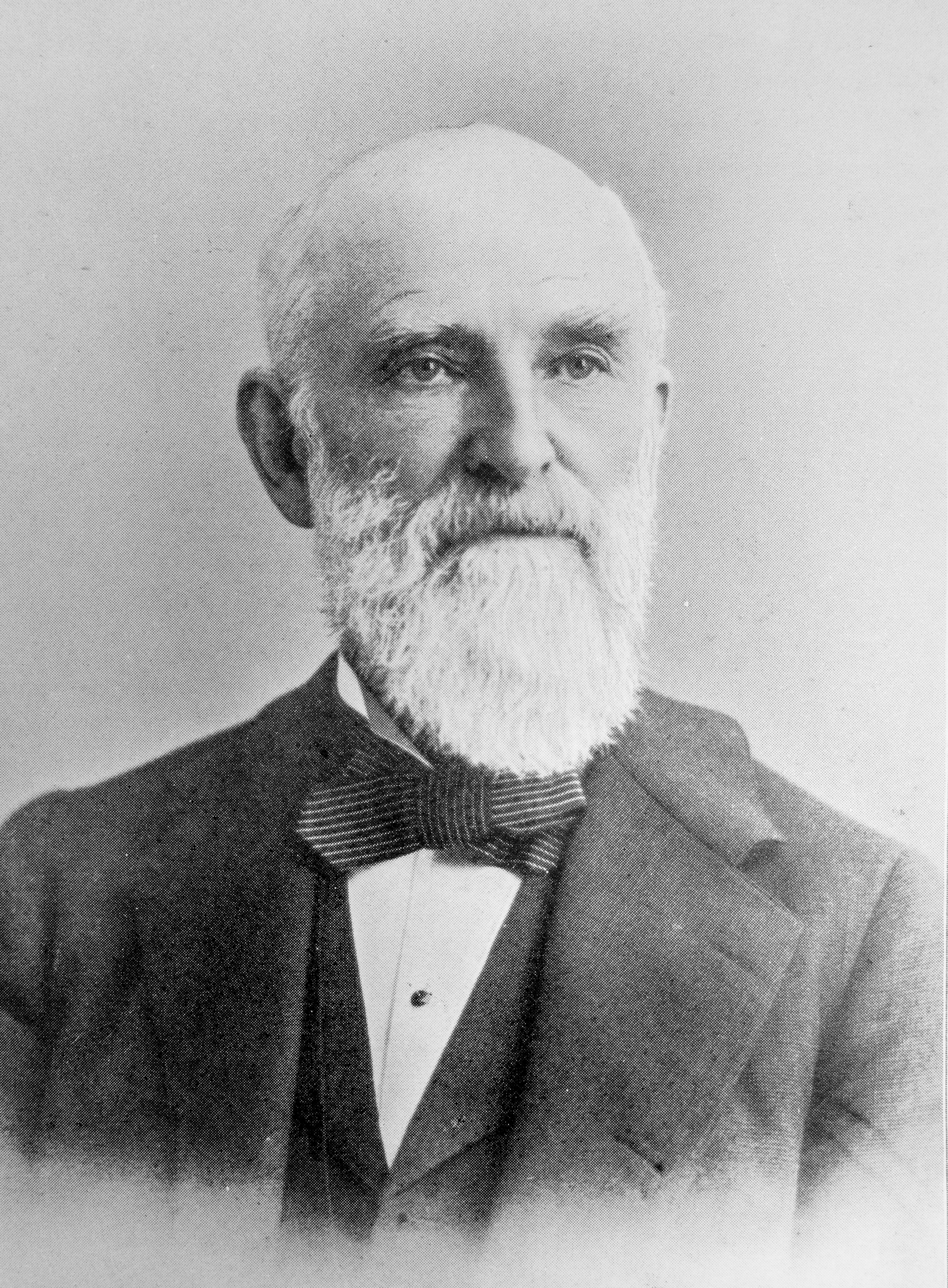

Lieutenant Governor of Rhode Island
- In office 1891–1892
- Governor: Herbert W. Ladd
- Preceded by: William T. C. Wardwell
- Succeeded by: Melville Bull

Member of the Rhode Island House of Representatives
- In office 1878–1881; 1887–1888

Personal details
- Born: October 23, 1825 Billerica, Massachusetts, U.S.
- Died: October 11, 1910 (aged 84)
- Resting place: Swan Point Cemetery
- Party: Republican
- Spouse: Kate Falconer
- Children: Justice Charles Falconer Stearns
- Education: Phillips Academy
- Occupation: Industrialist

Henry Augustus Stearns (October 23, 1825 – October 8, 1910) brought steam laundry to California, was a cotton wadding mill owner in Rhode Island, and a Lieutenant Governor of Rhode Island.

== Early life ==
Stearns was born October 23, 1825, in Billerica, Massachusetts, the seventh generation of an old New England family which traced its ancestry back to Isaac Stearns, who settled in Watertown, Massachusetts from England in 1630. He attended Phillips Academy for two years, then worked as a shoemaker and as a clerk in a general store until he was 20 years old. Before long, Stearns moved to Cincinnati, Ohio, to join his brother George S. manufacturing cotton wadding, in the first such factory west of the Allegheny Mountains.

== Wandering years ==
In 1850, Henry, feeling wanderlust, sold out his interest in the cotton wadding factory to his brother, and headed to California to join in the gold rush. He decided he would transport a steam boiler and machinery, with the intent to start a steam laundry in San Francisco. This required a land transport across the isthmus of Panama on the backs of men, then a sea voyage on an old whaling ship which sprang a leak, became disabled and set adrift. By the time the crew arrived in San Francisco four months later, the Stearns and the crew were near-starving. A doctor told Stearns he would not live. However, Stearns did recover. He set up the first steam laundry in California, became very successful, and then sold his share. He then moved on to operate a steam ferry boat named "Hector" between San Francisco and Oakland. He then moved on to the redwoods district and opened a steam sawmill.

In 1853, Stearns returned to Cincinnati, then moved a few more times, including Buffalo, New York and then Sangamon County, Illinois.

== Rhode Island ==
In 1861, Stearns moved to the state where he would remain the rest of his life: Rhode Island. There, he teamed with Pawtucket industrialist Darius Goff, manufacturing cotton wadding at the Union Wadding Company. Stearns became superintendent of the company in 1870, and president in 1891.

== Political life ==
Stearns was a lifelong Republican. He represented Lincoln in both houses of the State Legislature; first from 1878 to 1881 and again from 1887 to 1888. He was Lieutenant Governor of Rhode Island from 1891 to 1892.

== Personal life ==
Stearns married Kate Falconer of Hamilton, Ohio in 1856. Their children were: Deshler Falconer, George Russell, Walter Henry, Kate Russell, Justice Charles Falconer Stearns, Henry Foster, Anna Russell, who died in infancy, and Caroline. After 1862, the Stearns family lived in Central Falls, Rhode Island. His personal library was said to be among the finest in the state.

Stearns was a Mason; a member of the Sons of the American Revolution; and a member of the Society of Colonial Wars. He was also a member of the Central Falls Congregational Church.

Political offices
Preceded by William T. C. Wardwell	Lieutenant Governor of Rhode Island; 1891–1892	Succeeded by Melville Bull
