= General Society of Colonial Wars =

American patriotic society

- Established: May 10, 1893
- Founded at: New York City
- Type: 501(c)(3), patriotic organization
- Legal status: Nonprofit corporation
- Region served: United States
- Official language: English
- Website: gscw.org

The General Society of Colonial Wars is a patriotic society composed of men who trace their descents from forebears who, in military, naval, or civil positions of high trust and responsibility, by acts or counsel, assisted in the establishment, defense, and preservation of the mainland American colonies of Great Britain.

== History ==
In the summer of 1892 Samuel Victor Constant, Esq, Edward Trenchard, the well-known artist, and Colonel Thomas WaIn-Morgan Draper, a civil engineer convened in Colonel Draper's office at 45 Broadway to plan the formation of the Society. The General Society of Colonial Wars was organized in 1893, in the Governor's Room, City Hall, New York, by delegates from five States and the District of Columbia. A Constitution was adopted on May 10, 1893. There are now thirty-two constituent state societies. The first General Court met 19 December 1892, the anniversary date of the Great Swamp Fight of King Philip's War in 1675, it was announced that the Society had one hundred and five members. The total membership of state societies has for many years remained in the range of 4,000 to 4,500.

Approximately 21,000 men have joined the organization during its history, including many prominent Americans. The Society has long sought to improve public awareness of the importance of colonial events and individuals in the shaping of America. A number of monuments, plaques, and other markers have been installed by the Society at prevenient sites. The Society also funds research and educational initiatives of colonial relevance. In recent years, the goal of improving understanding of the colonial period has additionally been addressed by Samuel Victor Constant Fellowships, awarded annually for postgraduate study of colonial American history.

== Membership ==
To be eligible for membership in the Society an individual must be a male over age 18 who is lineally descendant from a person who served either in a military capacity or held public office in one of the original 13 colonies prior to the American Revolution. Specifically, the period from the settlement of Jamestown, Virginia on 13 May 1607, to the Battle of Lexington on 19 April 1775, and to limit qualifying ancestral service to those ancestors who served under the authority of the Colonies.

== Notable members ==
=== Government officials ===
==== Presidents and vice presidents ====
- Calvin Coolidge - 30th president of the United States
- Levi P. Morton – Vice President of the United States and Governor of New York.

==== Cabinet officers ====
- Lieutenant Commander Clarence D. Dillon, USN – Secretary of the Treasury.
- Elihu Root – U.S. Secretary of State and Secretary of War.

==== Diplomats ====
- Robert W. Bingham – United States Ambassador to the United Kingdom.
- Henry L. Wilson – Ambassador.
- Brevet Brigadier General Stewart L. Woodford - Envoy to Spain.
- J. Butler Wright – Ambassador.

==== Governors ====
- Sherman Adams – Governor of New Hampshire and White House Chief of Staff.
- Private Morgan Bulkeley, USV – Governor of Connecticut, United States Senator and insurance executive.
- Brigadier General Elisha Dyer Jr., RIM – Governor of Rhode Island.
- Major General Curtis Guild Jr., MVM – Governor of Massachusetts and militia general.
- Charles Dean Kimball – Governor of Rhode Island and U.S. Congressman.
- L. Bradford Prince – Governor of New Mexico Territory and New York State Senator.
- Henry Roberts – Governor of Connecticut.
- Colonel Edward Curtis Smith – Governor of Vermont
- Charles S. Whitman – Governor of New York.
- Roger Wolcott – Governor of Massachusetts.
- Urban A. Woodbury – Governor of Vermont.

==== U.S. senators ====
- William W. Barbour – United States Senator.
- Chauncey Depew – United States Senator.
- Colonel Richard Thomas Walker Duke, CSA – United States Senator
- Captain Henry A. du Pont, USA – United States Senator.
- Hamilton Fish Kean – United States Senator.
- Truman Handy Newberry – Secretary of the Navy, United States Senator.
- Captain Claiborne Pell, USCGR – United States Senator.
- Thomas C. Platt – United States Senator.
- H. Alexander Smith – United States Senator.
- Sheldon Whitehouse - United States Senator.

==== U.S. representatives ====
- Thomas R. Ball – U.S. Congressman.
- Henry M. Baker – U.S. Congressman.
- Franklin Bartlett – U.S. Congressman.
- Henry S. Boutell – U.S. Congressman.
- Melville Bull – U.S. Congressman.
- Charles P. Farnsley – U.S. Congressman.
- Henry Stockbridge Jr. – United States Representative.

==== Mayors ====
- Colonel Louis R. Cheney, CTM – mayor of Hartford, Connecticut.
- Carter Harrison III – mayor of Chicago.
- Henry Oscar Houghton– mayor of Cambridge, Massachusetts.
- James Phinney Baxter –mayor of Portland, Maine.
- Josiah Quincy – mayor of Boston.

==== Others ====
- Howard R. Bayne Member of the New York State Senate.
- Colonel Samuel Pomeroy Colt, RIM – Rhode Island Attorney General, militia officer, businessman and politician.
- Ignatius Cooper Grubb – Delaware Secretary of State
- Stanley F. Reed – U.S. Supreme Court associate justice.
- Paul Suttell – Chief Justice of the Rhode Island Supreme Court.
- Rear Admiral Walter Wyman, MHS – Surgeon General of the United States.

=== Military officers ===
- Admiral of the Navy George Dewey – Hero of the Battle of Manila Bay.
- Vice Admiral Stuart H. Ingersoll – President of the Naval War College.
- Major General John R. Brooke – Veteran of the Civil War and Spanish–American War.
- Major General Francis Fessenden – Civil War general.
- Major General William B. Franklin – Union Army officer and Vice President of Colt Firearms.
- Major General Frederick Dent Grant – Son of President Ulysses S. Grant.
- Major General Robert E. Noble, MC – Career Army medical officer. Recipient of the Distinguished Service Medal.
- Major General James F. Wade - Commanded 5th Corps in Cuba.
- Major General Joseph Wheeler – Confederate Lieutenant General, U.S. Army Major General and Congressman.
- Major General Leonard Wood – Medal of Honor recipient and U.S. Army Chief of Staff.
- Rear Admiral John R. Bartlett, USN – Oceanographer.
- Rear Admiral William G. Buehler - Veteran of the Civil War and Spanish-American War.
- Rear Admiral Richard Worsam Meade, USN
- Rear Admiral Joseph B. Murdock, USN
- Rear Admiral Francis A. Roe – Career Navy officer.
- Rear Admiral Aaron Ward – Career Navy officer.
- Brevet Major General Adelbert Ames – Governor of and Senator from Mississippi.
- Brevet Major General Absalom Baird – Civil War general and Medal of Honor recipient.
- Brevet Major General Isaac S. Catlin – Civil War veteran and Medal of Honor recipient.
- Brevet Major General Theodore S. Peck – Civil War veteran and Medal of Honor recipient.
- Brigadier General Charles Wheaton Abbot Jr. – Adjutant General of Rhode Island.
- Brigadier General Richard Napoleon Batchelder – Medal of Honor recipient.
- Brigadier General Joseph Lancaster Brent, CSA – California State Assembly member.
- Brigadier General John Ross Delafield
- Brigadier General Edgar S. Dudley
- Brigadier General Morris Cooper Foote
- Brigadier General James Forney, USMC
- Brevet Brigadier General Charles R. Brayton – Political boss of Rhode Island.
- Colonel William Seward Webb – Inspector General of the Vermont Militia.
- Captain Vincent Astor, USNR – Heir to John Jacob Astor IV and husband of Brooke Astor.
- Captain Alfred Brooks Fry, USNR – Marine engineer.
- Brevet Colonel Johnston de Peyster – Union Army officer.
- Commander Guy Castle, USN – Medal of Honor recipient.
- Lieutenant Colonel John Jacob Astor IV, USV – Heir to the Astor fortune. Died on the RMS Titanic.
- Captain Alexander Macomb Wetherill - Killed in action at the Battle of Santiago.

=== Others ===
- Francis Ellingwood Abbot – Philosopher and theologian
- John Jacob Astor IV - Real estate tycoon
- Willard Bartlett – Chief Judge of the New York Court of Appeals
- Henry L. P. Beckwith Jr. – Genealogist and historian
- George Madison Bodge – Author and historian
- John Nicholas Brown I – Philanthropist
- John Coolidge – Business executive
- Madison Grant – Eugenicist, conservationist, and author
- Alexander Hamilton – Episcopalian priest
- John B. Hattendorf – Naval historian
- Rowland Hazard III – Business executive
- Jack Holt – Actor
- Norman Isham – Architectural historian
- Lawrence Park – Art historian, architect, and genealogist
- William Stevens Perry – Second Episcopalian bishop of the Diocese of Iowa.
- Alexander Hamilton Rice Jr. – Explorer
- Henry Lyttleton Savage – Princeton University professor
- William Watts Sherman – Socialite
- Henry A. Stearns (1825–1910) – Rhode Island industrialist
- John Austin Stevens – Founder of the Sons of the Revolution
- Woodbridge Strong Van Dyke II — MGM Film Director
- Henry Benjamin Whipple – First Episcopal bishop of Minnesota.
- Theodore Salisbury Woolsey – Yale law professor.

== See also ==
- National Society Daughters of Colonial Wars
- List of hereditary and lineage organizations in the United States
