= George L. Littlefield =

American businessman and philanthropist (1824–1902)

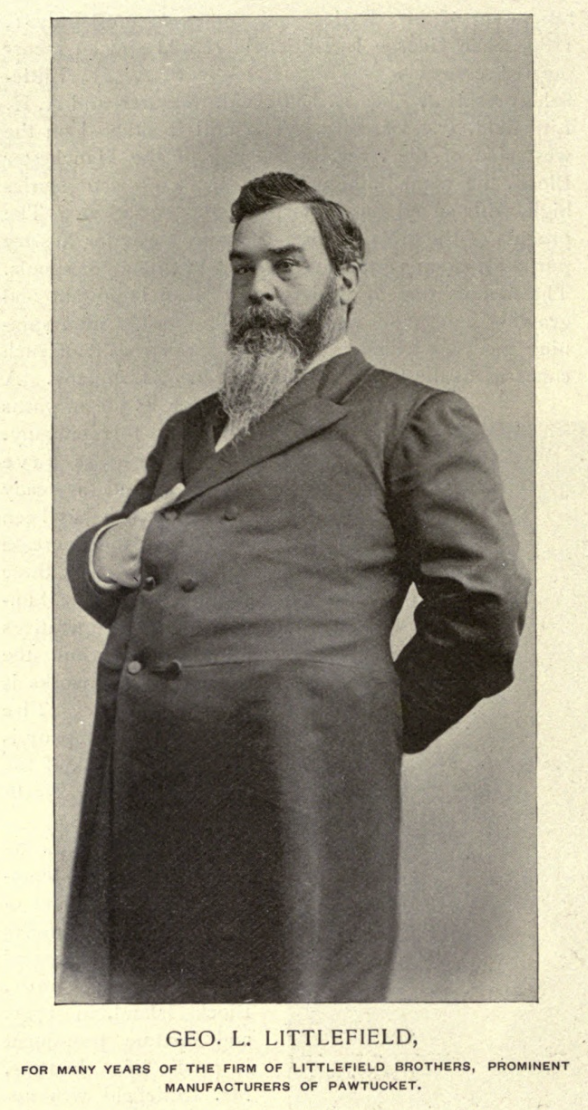
- Littlefield, prominent manufacturer of Pawtucket, 1891
- Born: 1824; North Kingstown, Rhode Island, US
- Died: December 19, 1902 (aged 77–78); Pawtucket, Rhode Island, US
- Burial place: Swan Point Cemetery
- Occupations: Businessman, philanthropist
- Children: 1
- Relatives: Daniel Littlefield (brother); Alfred H. Littlefield (brother)

George Leander Littlefield (1824 – December 19, 1902) was an American businessman and philanthropist. He was the leader of Rhode Island's late nineteenth-century textile industry with ownership and managerial roles in the Cumberland Mills Company, the Pawtucket Hair Cloth Company and other firms. He was a director of several Rhode Island banks and was prominent in local Democratic politics, nominated for the positions of mayor of Pawtucket, and governor and senator. His bequest of $500,000 to Brown University was the largest given to the university at the time.

== Career ==
Littlefield was born in North Kingstown, Rhode Island, in 1824, a member of a large family which included brothers Daniel Littlefield and Alfred H. Littlefield. After some years of work in a textile mill and at a store, in 1852 he became a partner with David Ryder in David Ryder & Co., a manufacturer of threads and yarns.

After Ryder left the firm Littlefield's brother, Alfred H., joined the firm, which was renamed Littlefield Brothers. George left the firm in 1889. He was also president and manager of the Cumberland Mills Company, organized in 1866, and was "for years one of the guiding spirits in the Pawtucket Hair Cloth Company." In 1881, Littlefield joined the board of directors of the First National Bank of Providence, becoming vice president in 1885 and president in 1891. He was also a director of the Industrial Trust Company.

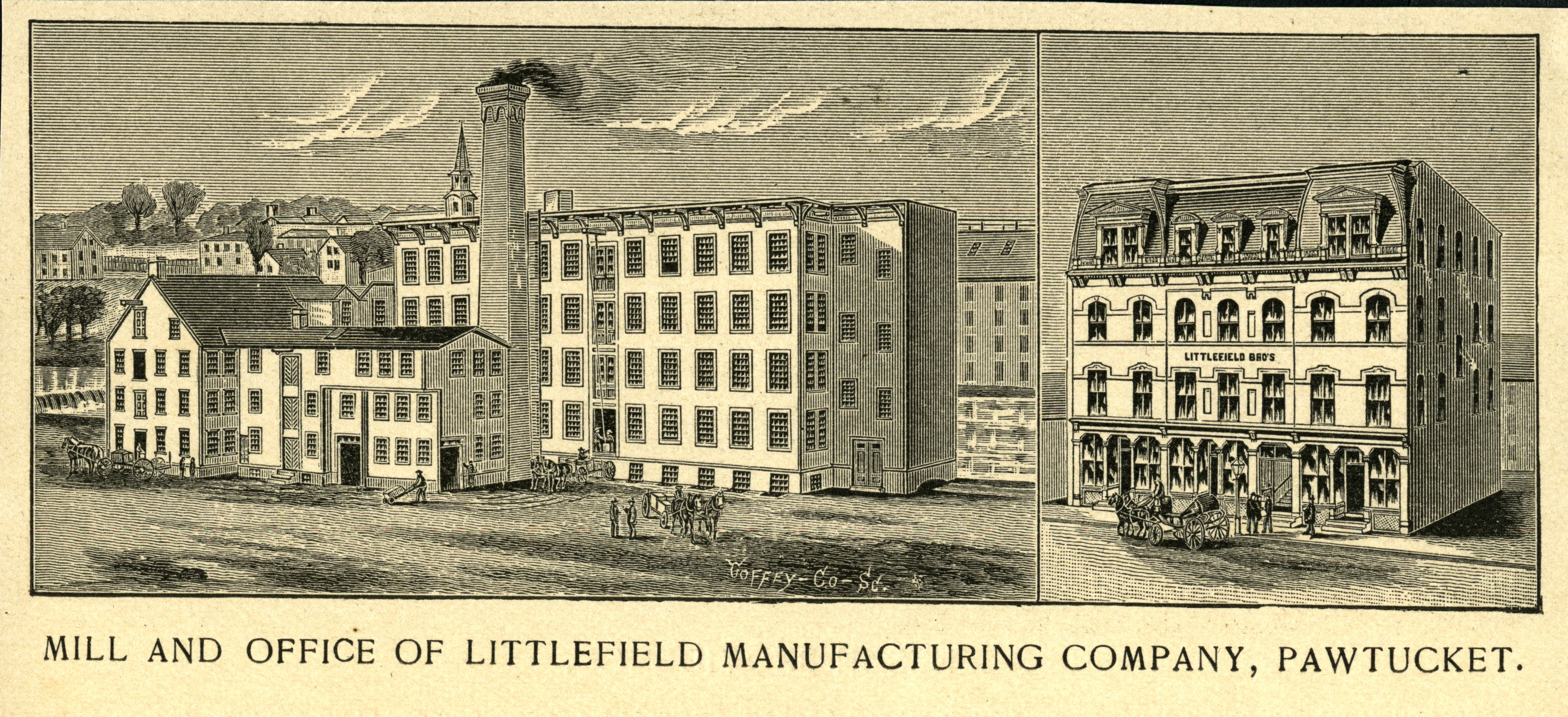
Mill and office of Littlefield Manufacturing Company, Pawtucket, RI

== Marriage and children ==
Littlefield married Miss Ann Frances Cobb in 1846 and had one daughter, Mary Frances. In 1859, he married Harriet Messenger, who died in 1895.

== Death and legacy ==
Littlefield died at his home in Pawtucket, Rhode Island, on December 19, 1902, aged 77 or 78, and was buried in Swan Point Cemetery.

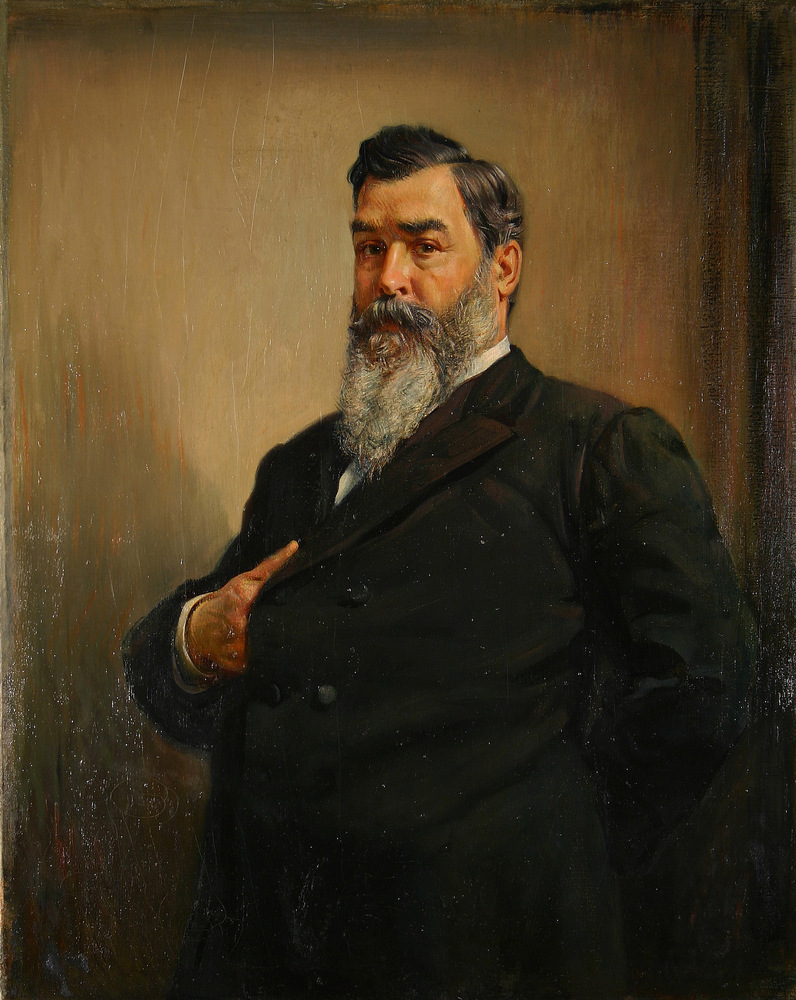
George Littlefield portrait from Brown University Portrait Collection

Littlefield's will provided that after the death of his wife his estate should go to Brown University, $100,000 for the establishment of "a perpetual trust fund for the establishment and maintenance" of a professorship of American history and the rest to the university's general funds, "to be held and applied by said university for the promotion of its objects and purposes as an educational institution, as its government for the time being shall deem best." The President's report noted that Littlefield, though not an alumnus, had "taken a constantly increasing interest in Brown University. He was a warm friend of President Andrews" and had given $10,000 to the Endowment Fund in 1900. Still, the university was surprised by the amount of the gift given by "this quiet, unostentatious man." The New York Times estimated the bequest at $500,000. It was the largest single gift in the university's history.

At the time of the Littlefield gift, the university was in deep financial difficulty, "compelled by the large deficit to take drastic measures for reducing expenses." The Littlefield bequest, wrote the president, would "supply a safe and strong foundation... As long as the University endures, it will remember with gratitude the name of Mr. Littlefield."

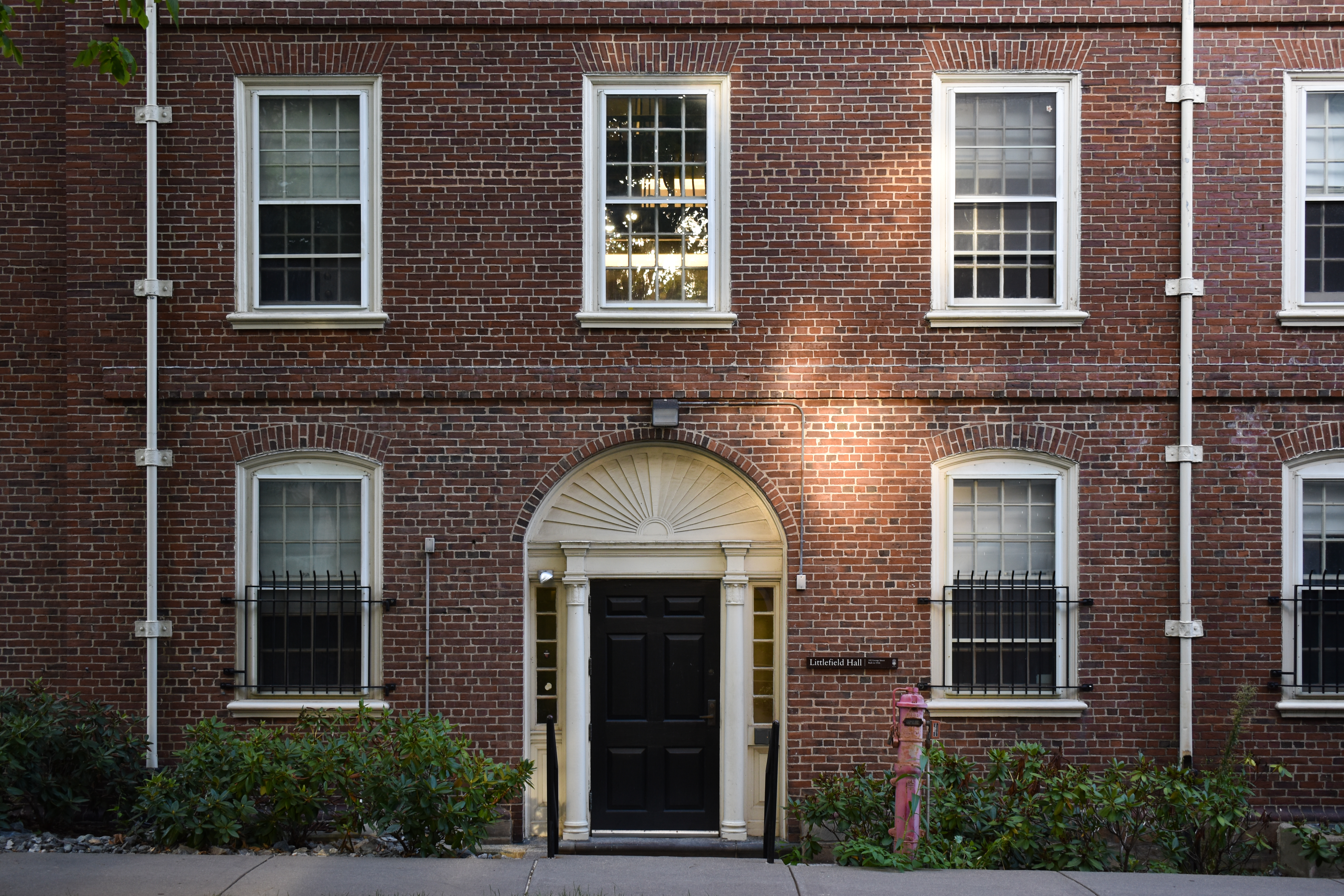
Littlefield Hall, a Brown dormitory built in 1925 with funds from the Littlefield bequest (Brown)

The following have held the title of the George L. Littlefield Professor of American History at Brown University:

- William MacDonald (1905–1917)
- St. George Leakin Sioussat (1917–1931)
- James Blaine Hedges (1931–1965)
- John "Jack" Lovell Thomas (1965?–2002)
- A. Hunter Dupree (1968–1981), Littlefield professor of history
- Howard Chudacoff (2002–2023)
- Steven Lubar (2023–2025)
- Seth Rockman (2025- )
