= 1893 Rhode Island gubernatorial election =

- April 5, 1893

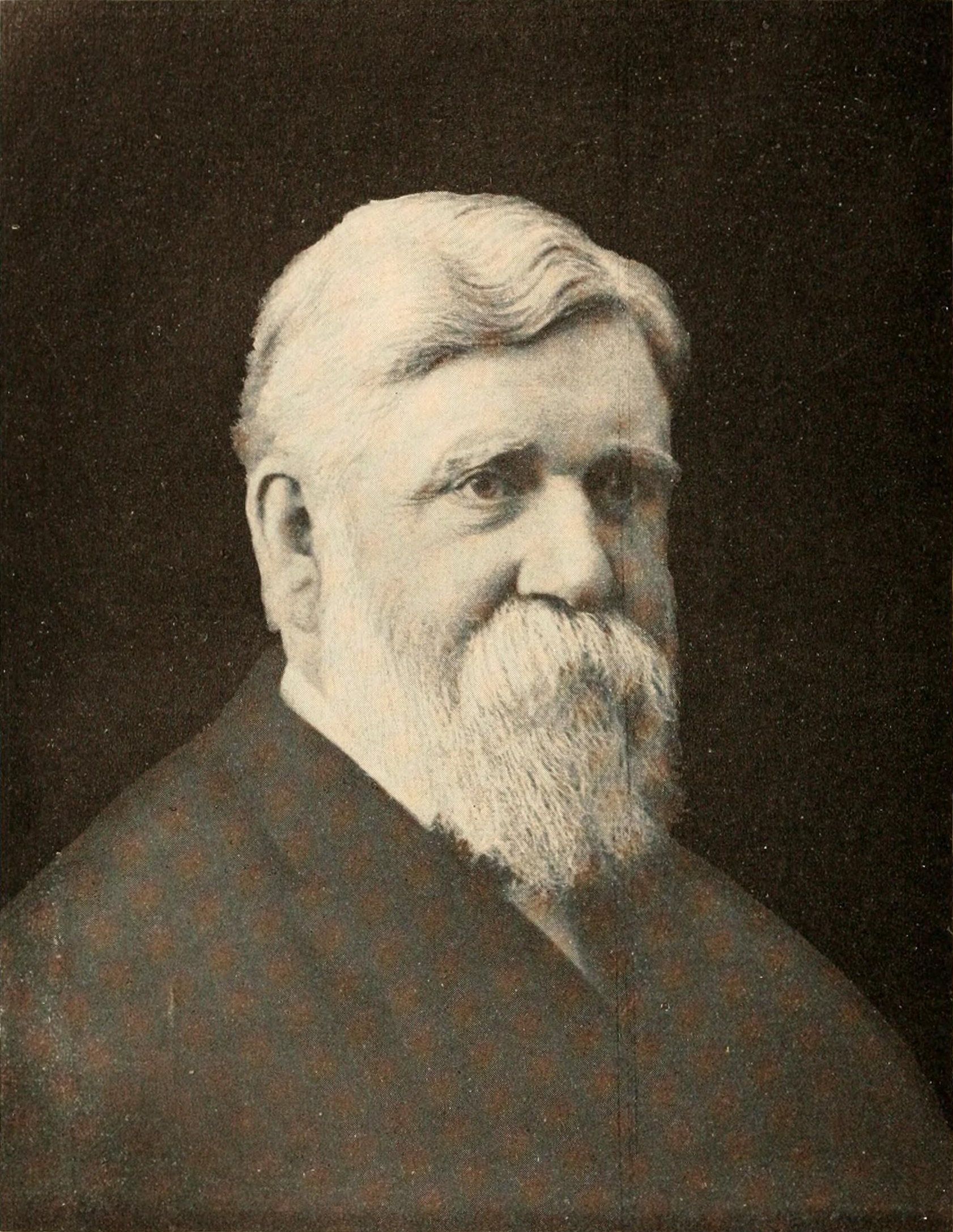
Nominee	Daniel Russell Brown	David S. Baker	Henry B. Metcalf
Party	Republican	Democratic	Prohibition
Popular vote	21,830	22,015	3,265
Percentage	46.34%	46.73%	6.93%
- County results Brown: 40–50% 50–60% Baker: 40–50%
Governor before election
Daniel Russell Brown
Republican
Elected Governor
Daniel Russell Brown
Republican

The 1893 Rhode Island gubernatorial election was held on April 5, 1893. Incumbent Republican Daniel Russell Brown defeated Democratic nominee David S. Baker with 46.34% of the vote.

== General election ==
=== Candidates ===
Major party candidates

- Daniel Russell Brown, Republican
- David S. Baker, Democratic

Other candidates

- Henry B. Metcalf, Prohibition

=== Results ===
1893 Rhode Island gubernatorial election
Party	Candidate	Votes	%	±%
Republican	Daniel Russell Brown (incumbent)	21,830	46.34%	
Democratic	David S. Baker	22,015	46.73%	
Prohibition	Henry B. Metcalf	3,265	6.93%	
Majority		185		
Turnout				
Republican hold		Swing		
