= John L. Thomas =

American historian (1926–2005)

John Lovell Thomas
- Born: 28 October 1926; Portland, Maine
- Died: June 11, 2005 (aged 78); Providence, Rhode Island

John "Jack" Lovell Thomas (28 October 1926 – June 11, 2005) was the George L. Littlefield Professor of American History at Brown University, Rhode Island, USA.

He entered Bowdoin College, Maine in 1944 to study history. He then taught for a year at Washington Academy, East Machias, Maine before enrolling for a year at Columbia University, New York, where he was awarded an M.A. degree in 1950. He then taught for four years at Barnard College, New York and for a further five at Brown University, where he received his Ph.D. After a further three years teaching at Harvard University he returned to Brown University as Littlefield Professor, remaining there until his retirement in 2002.

He was awarded the 1964 Bancroft Prize for his biography of William Lloyd Garrison, The Liberator. His other books include Alternative America and A Country in the Mind. He benefitted from a Guggenheim Fellowship in 1966 and was a Woodrow Wilson Fellow in 1982.

He was married with one son and one daughter.
