= 1894 Rhode Island gubernatorial election =

- April 4, 1894

Nominee	Daniel Russell Brown	David S. Baker
Party	Republican	Democratic
Popular vote	29,157	22,650
Percentage	53.15%	41.29%
- Brown: 40–50% 50–60% 60–70% 70–80% 80-90% Baker: 40–50%
Governor before election
Daniel Russell Brown
Republican
Elected Governor
Daniel Russell Brown
Republican

The 1894 Rhode Island gubernatorial election was held on April 4, 1894. Incumbent Republican Daniel Russell Brown defeated Democratic nominee David S. Baker with 53.15% of the vote.

== General election ==
=== Candidates ===
Major party candidates

- Daniel Russell Brown, Republican
- David S. Baker, Democratic

Other candidates

- Henry B. Metcalf, Prohibition
- Charles G. Baylor, Socialist Labor
- Henry A. Burlingame, People's

=== Results ===
1894 Rhode Island gubernatorial election
Party	Candidate	Votes	%	±%
Republican	Daniel Russell Brown (incumbent)	29,157	53.15%	
Democratic	David S. Baker	22,650	41.29%	
Prohibition	Henry B. Metcalf	2,241	4.09%	
Socialist Labor	Charles G. Baylor	592	1.08%	
Populist	Henry A. Burlingame	223	0.41%	
Majority		6,507		
Turnout				
Republican hold		Swing		
