= Providence Children's Museum =

Children's museum in Providence, Rhode Island

- Former name: Children's Museum of Rhode Island
- Established: 1977
- Location: 100 South Street; Providence, Rhode Island
- Executive director: Caroline Payson
- Website: providencechildrensmuseum.org

The Providence Children's Museum (PCM) is a non-profit children's museum in Providence, Rhode Island. The museum is located at 100 South Street in the city's Jewelry District. It occupied the historic Pitcher-Goff House in Pawtucket prior to moving to its current location in 1997.

== History ==
=== Children's Museum of Rhode Island (1977–1997) ===
Originally named the Children's Museum of Rhode Island, the museum was founded in 1977 and is the first children's museum in the state. The Pawtucket Congregational Church leased its Pitcher-Goff House to the museum, and the building was renovated with exhibits, play spaces, and activities for children and opened in 1977. Due to increasing attendance, in the 1980s, the museum sought out a larger site as its building could only hold 100 people at once and had 3,000 square feet (280 m^{2}) of exhibit space. It reported attendance of 40,000 in 1986.

With the state's Department of Children, Youth & Families (DCYF), the museum began operating the "Families Together" program in 1991 to provide social services for families separated by the DCYF, such as managing supervised visitation between children and parents.

=== Providence location (1997–present) ===
The museum moved to its current location on 100 South Street in the Jewelry District of Providence in 1997. The two-floor 15,000 square feet (1,400 m^{2}) brick building was purchased for $650,000; the surrounding 27,000 square feet (2,500 m^{2}) of outdoor space was intended to be used for exhibitions and car parking. Prior to the reopening, the museum announced that it would rename itself after Providence in appreciation of the city's $450,000 donation to the capital campaign for the move. A large sculpture of a colorful dragon, named Nori, is perched on a corner of its rooftop. Originally created for an exhibit at the Museum of Fine Arts, Boston, the sculpture was donated to the PCM in 1997 and given its name by an 11-year-old boy through a contest.

During the George W. Bush administration, in 2003, AmeriCorps funding for various local organizations including the museum was reduced or eliminated, while a new initiative by the Roman Catholic Diocese of Providence was financed.

The COVID-19 pandemic led to the museum's temporary closure in 2020, and interactive online programs were offered during this time. Later that year, the museum was impacted by a ransomware attack on Blackbaud, a software vendor. Upon reopening in late 2021, the museum reported that attendance had greatly reduced, noting as an inhibiting factor that children younger than 12 years old could not yet receive COVID-19 vaccinations.

== Governance ==
The museum has had three executive directors:

- Caroline Payson, 2016–present
- Janice O'Donnell, 1985–2014
- Jane Jerry, founding director

== See also ==
- List of museums in Rhode Island
