= Melville Bull =

American politician (1854–1909)

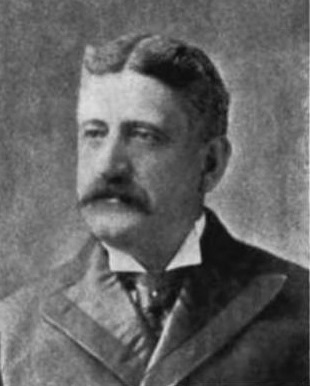

Member of the U.S. House of Representatives from Rhode Island's 1st congressional district
- In office March 4, 1895 – March 3, 1903
- Preceded by: Oscar Lapham
- Succeeded by: Daniel L.D. Granger

Lieutenant Governor of Rhode Island
- In office 1892–1894
- Governor: D. Russell Brown
- Preceded by: Henry A. Stearns
- Succeeded by: Edwin Allen

Member of the Rhode Island House of Representatives
- In office 1883-1885

Personal details
- Born: September 29, 1854 Newport, Rhode Island, U.S.
- Died: July 5, 1909 (aged 54) Middletown, Rhode Island, U.S.
- Party: Republican
- Education: Harvard University

Melville Bull (September 29, 1854 – July 5, 1909) was a U.S. representative from Rhode Island.

Born in Newport, Rhode Island, Bull attended Phillips Exeter Academy, Exeter, New Hampshire, and graduated from Harvard University in 1877. He was then involved in farming in the vicinity of Newport.

He served as member of the state house of representatives from 1883 to 1885 and as a state senator from 1885 to 1892. He served as member of the Republican state central committee and served as delegate to the Republican National Convention in 1888. He also served as Lieutenant Governor of Rhode Island from 1892 to 1894 under Governor D. Russell Brown.

Bull was a charter member of the Rhode Island Society of Colonial Wars in 1897.

Bull was elected as a Republican to the Fifty-fourth and to the three succeeding Congresses (March 4, 1895, to March 3, 1903). He served as chairman of the Committee on Accounts (Fifty-sixth and Fifty-seventh Congresses).

He was an unsuccessful candidate for reelection in 1902 to the Fifty-eighth Congress.

He lived in Middletown, Rhode Island, until his death on July 5, 1909, in Newport. He was interred in Island Cemetery, Newport, Rhode Island.

== Sources ==
- United States Congress. "Melville Bull (id: B001048)". Biographical Directory of the United States Congress. This article incorporates public domain material from Biographical Directory of the United States Congress. Federal government of the United States.

Political offices
Preceded by Henry A. Stearns	Lieutenant Governor of Rhode Island; 1892–1894	Succeeded by Edwin Allen
U.S. House of Representatives
Preceded by Oscar Lapham	Member of the U.S. House of Representatives from Rhode Island's 1st congressional district 1895-1903	Succeeded by Daniel L.D. Granger
