= Darius Goff =

American politician (1809–1891)

Coordinates: 41.85556°N 71.38139°W

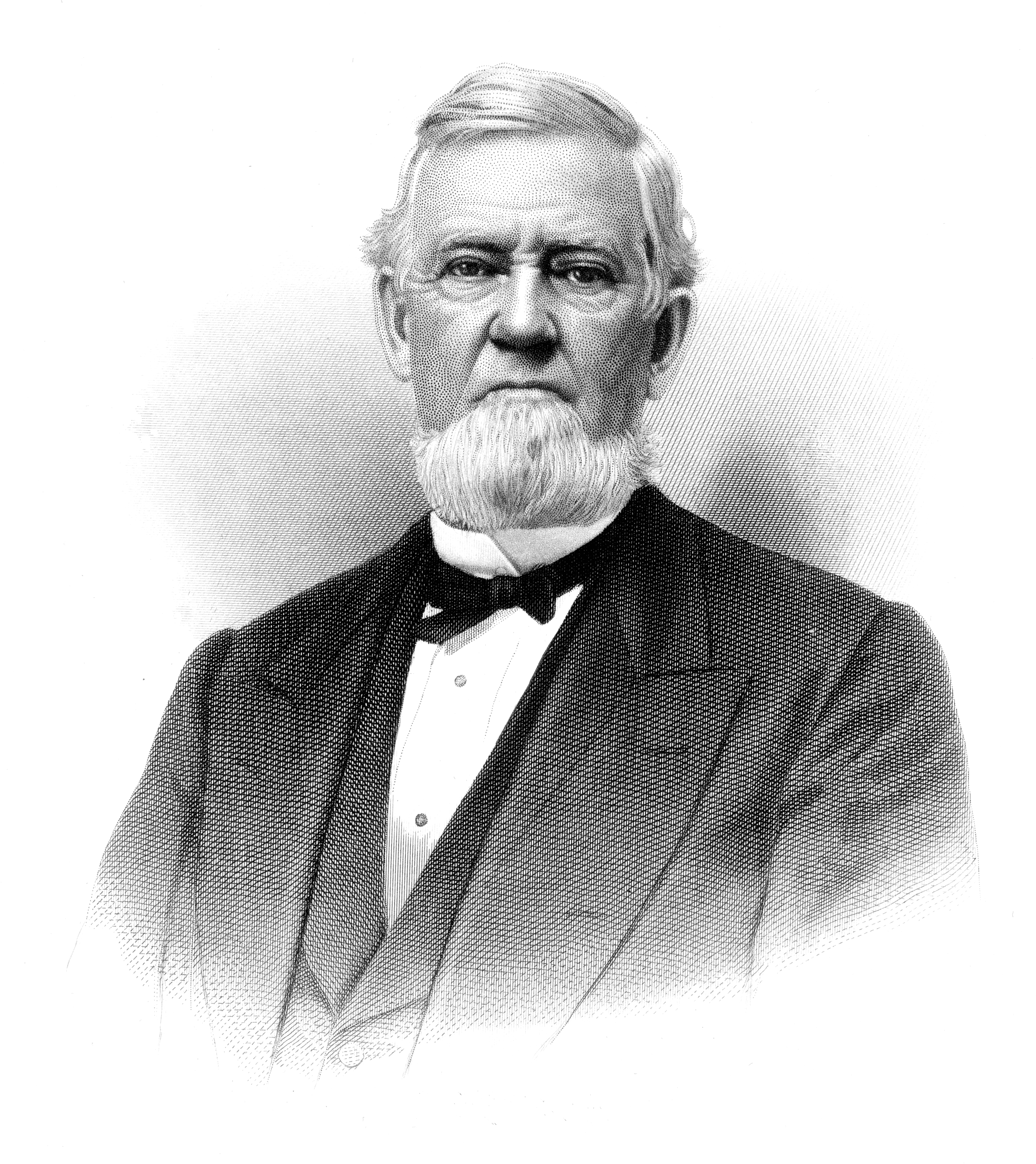
- Born: May 10, 1809; Rehoboth, Massachusetts
- Died: April 14, 1891 (aged 81); Pawtucket, Rhode Island
- Resting place: Swan Point Cemetery, Providence, Rhode Island
- Occupations: Industrialist, businessman
- Known for: Innovations in textile manufacturing and cotton recycling
- Spouse(s): Sarah Lee, Harriet Lee
- Children: Darius Lee Goff, Lyman B. Goff, Sarah C. (Goff) Steele
- Parent(s): Lieutenant Richard and Mehitable (Bullock) Goff

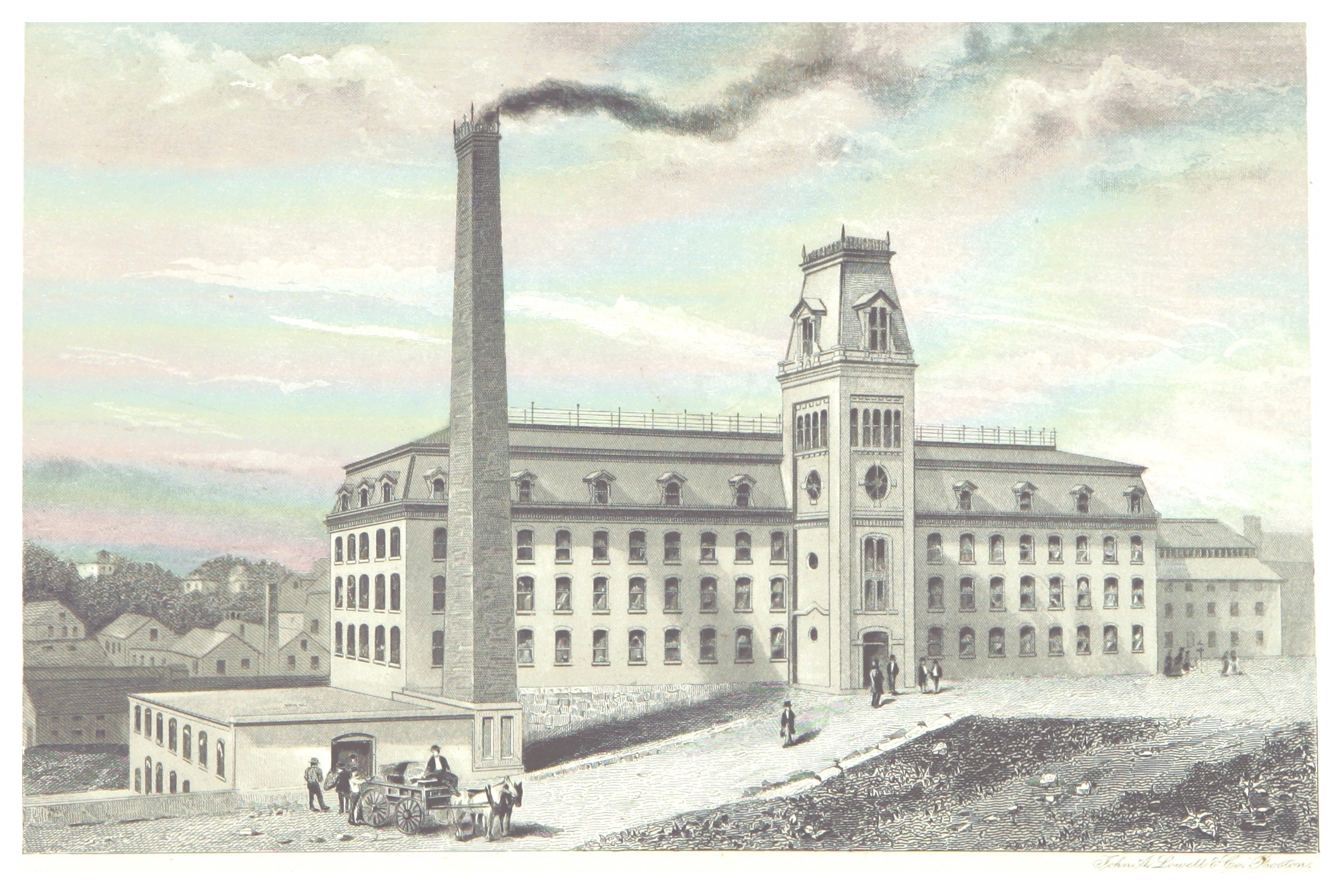
D. Goff & Sons Pawtucket factory in 1876

Darius Goff (May 10, 1809 – April 14, 1891) was one of the foremost textile manufacturers in the United States and a leading citizen of Pawtucket, Rhode Island. He is known for introducing the manufacture of worsted braids and mohair plush upholstery into the United States.

== Biography ==
=== Early life ===
Goff was born in Rehoboth, Massachusetts into a textile mill–owning family. His father, Lt. Richard Goff, was a partner in the Union Manufacturing Company in Rehoboth, dyeing yarn which would be made into cloth. As a youth, Darius worked in his father's factory, until it closed its doors in 1821.

In 1826, at age 17, Goff headed to Fall River to study the woolen business with John and Jesse Eddy. His career was temporarily put on hold when he suffered a serious accident. For three years Goff worked as a clerk in a Providence grocery store while he recovered.

=== Textile career ===
After Goff recovered from his injury, together with his brother Nelson he bought the Union Cotton Mill in Rehoboth in 1836. Unfortunately, this mill soon burned to the ground. Goff then turned his attention to the cotton waste business. Darius started contracting with local cotton mills to take their refuse. By 1847, he started the Union Wadding Company to process cotton waste into a wadded form that was usable by paper mills, and then he sold this wadding to paper mills to be made into paper. In 1871, that mill burned down. Fortunately, by 1861 Goff had begun the manufacture of worsted braids, first under the name of the American Worsted Co., then in 1864 under the name D. Goff & Son, with his son Darius L. Goff as partner. The braids were often mentioned in the advertisements for the company of Pawtucket. When his other son Lyman joined the company, it became D. Goff & Sons.

Goff was determined to produce mohair plush for upholstery, such as the kind used for car seats. Goff sent associates to France and Germany to uncover how the process was done, but they failed to learn the trade secrets. Goff eventually wound up creating his own process through trial and error, becoming the first manufacturer of plush in the United States in 1882.

=== Other achievements ===
Goff was also at various times a director of various concerns including The Franklin Savings Bank, the First National Bank, the Pawtucket Street Railroad, The Pawtucket Hair Cloth Co, and others. He was a member of the National Association of Wool Manufacturers. Goff served repeatedly on the Town Council of Pawtucket, and in 1871, he was elected to the Rhode Island State Senate.

== Personal life ==
Goff was twice married; first in 1839 to Sarah Lee, daughter of Israel Lee of Dighton, Massachusetts; Sarah died early, and she had no children. After Sarah's death, Goff married her sister Harriet. Their three children were Darius Lee and Lyman Bullock Goff, who went into the family business; and his daughter Sarah married Thomas S. Steele of Hartford, Connecticut. Goff was a lifelong Republican and since 1848 member of the Pawtucket Congregational Church.

=== Goff's sons ===
Goff's sons Darius (1840–1926) and Lyman Bullock (1841–1927) followed their father into the textile business; in 1872, the firm became known as D. Goff & Sons. They are credited for introducing electric power to Pawtucket, as well as founding the Pawtucket Boys Club. Lyman is the namesake for the Lyman B Goff Junior High School in Pawtucket, and for a time lived in the historic Pitcher-Goff House. The brothers were inducted into the Rhode Island Heritage Hall of Fame in 1997. Like their father, the Goff sons were deeply involved with the Pawtucket Congregational Church.

=== Burial ===
Darius Goff is buried with his family in Swan Point Cemetery, Providence, Rhode Island.

== Goff Memorial Hall ==
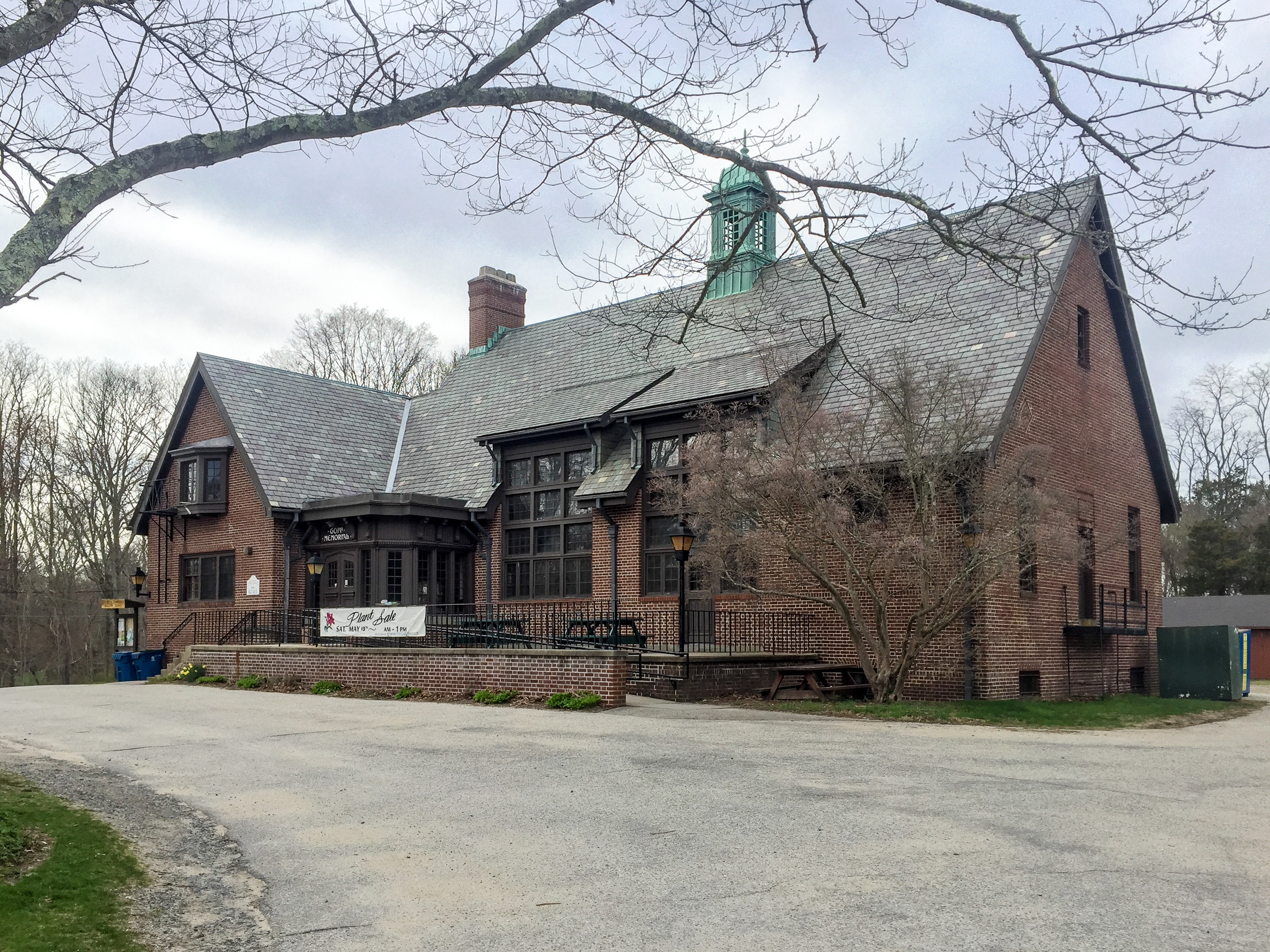
Goff Memorial Hall

In 1884 Goff gave money and land for the building of a library and school in Rehoboth. The large, wooden Victorian building was named Goff Memorial Hall. It opened in March 1886. It was struck by lightning and burned to the ground in July 1911. A new brick building was built in 1915 at 124 Bay State Road. The building was named Goff Memorial Hall and it houses Blanding Public Library.
