= William T. C. Wardwell =

American politician (1835–1907)

Lieutenant Governor of Rhode Island
- In office 1890–1891
- Governor: John W. Davis
- Preceded by: Daniel Littlefield
- Succeeded by: Henry A. Stearns

Personal details
- Born: September 20, 1835 Bristol, Rhode Island, US
- Died: October 16, 1907 (aged 72) Bristol, Rhode Island, US
- Party: Democratic Party
- Spouse: Lenora Frances Gladding (m. 1874)
- Occupation: Politician, jeweler, timber manufacturer

William Thomas Church Wardwell (September 20, 1835 – October 16, 1907) was an American politician. He was Lieutenant Governor of Rhode Island from 1890 to 1891.

== Personal life ==
Wardwell was born in Bristol, Rhode Island on September 20, 1835, the son of Hezekiah Church and Sallie (Gifford) Wardwell. Growing up he attended public schools. He graduated from high school in 1848. He first profession was that of a jeweler with Sackett, Davis & Potter of Providence, from 1853 to 1856. He traveled for some time in Cuba and in New York City before returning to Bristol in 1859.

When he returned to Bristol in 1859, together with his brother, he took control of his father's business in the timber industry. In 1872, he paid off his brother for his stake in the company and became the sole owner. He continued the timber business until 1894.

On November 24, 1874, he married Lenora Frances Gladding.

Wardwell also had experience in other industries. He worked in the vestry of St. Michael's Church in Bristol. He was president of the First National Bank of Bristol and a director of the Industrial Trust Company of Providence. He was a Freemasons and a member of the Sons of the American Revolution.

== Political life ==
Politically, Wardwell was a member of the Democratic Party. In June 1876, he was a delegate to the Democratic National Convention in St. Louis. From 1890 to 1891 he was Lieutenant Governor of Rhode Island under Governor John W. Davis. He was deputy governor and chairman of the state senate.

He had also been a Representative and Senator in the General Assembly from Bristol. In 1893, he ran unsuccessfully for the office of governor. He died at his home in Bristol on October 16, 1907, at the age of 72, and was buried at Juniper Hill Cemetery.

Political offices
| Preceded by Daniel Littlefield | Lieutenant Governor of Rhode Island; 1890–1891 | Succeeded by Henry A. Stearns |
