= Quality Hill Historic District (Pawtucket, Rhode Island) =

Historic district in Rhode Island, United States

- U.S. National Register of Historic Places
- U.S. Historic district
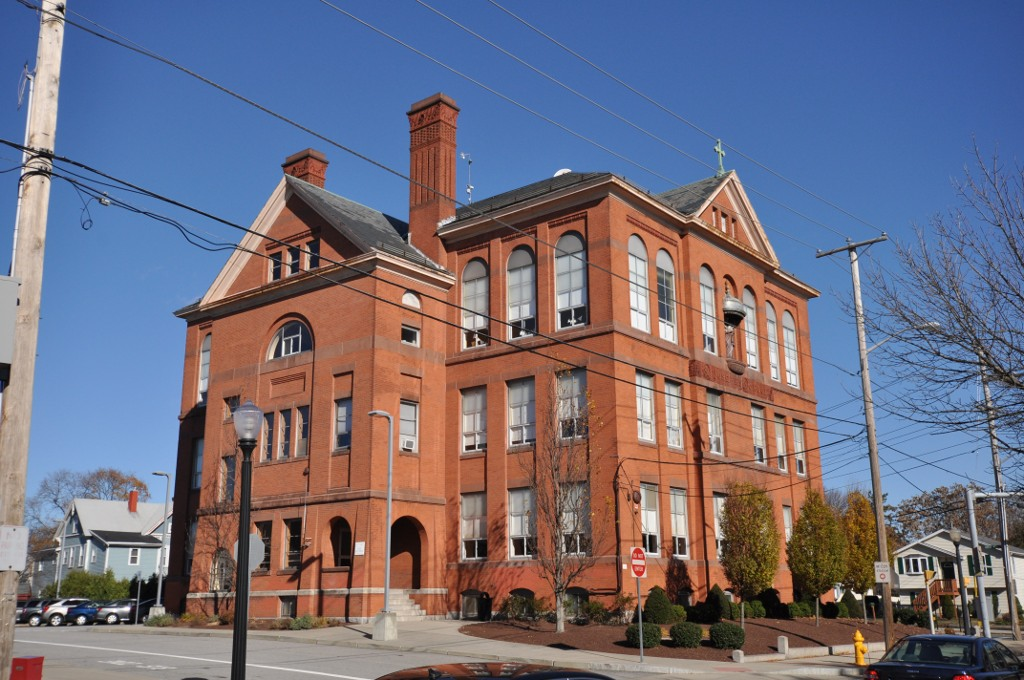
- St. Joseph's School (now Saint Raphael Academy) on Walcott Street

- Location within Rhode Island Location within the United States
- Location: Pawtucket, Rhode Island
- Coordinates: 41°52′40″N 71°22′25″W
- Built: 1830
- Architect: Multiple
- Architectural style: Greek Revival, Late Victorian, Federal
- MPS: Pawtucket MRA
- NRHP reference No.: 84002041
- Added to NRHP: April 13, 1984

The Quality Hill Historic District is a predominantly residential historic district on the east side of Pawtucket, Rhode Island. This area was developed as an upper-class residential area between the 1850s and the 1940s, and its architecture reflects a cross-section of styles popular in that time. Most of its residential stock is single-family residences, and is generally set on ample lots, although there are areas of more dense construction. The most densely populated area is a section of the neighborhood which was cut off from the rest by the construction of I-95. The most prominent non-residential buildings are the Pawtucket Congregational Church, Saint Raphael Academy, Assumption of the Virgin Mary Greek Orthodox Church, and the complex of the Roman Catholic St. Joseph's Parish.

The district main spine is Walcott Street which run eastward from the Seekonk River, and which provides a bridge across I-95 (as does Underwood Street) joining the two sections of the district. The eastern end of the district at Walcott is Bend Street. It extends northward as far as Lyon Street, and radiates south from Walcott on School, Summit, Maynard, and Arlington Streets. The district was listed on the National Register of Historic Places in 1984.

== See also ==
- National Register of Historic Places listings in Pawtucket, Rhode Island
