= Edith Achilles =

American psychologist (1892-1989)

Edith Frances Mulhall Achilles
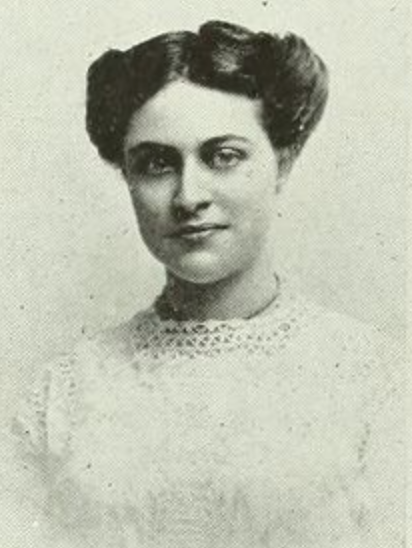
- Edith Mulhall, from the 1914 yearbook of Barnard College
- Born: 6 August 1892; Boston, Massachusetts, United States
- Died: March 1989; New York, New York, United States
- Education: Barnard College, Columbia University
- Spouse: Paul Strong Achilles
- Children: 1 daughter

Edith Frances Mulhall Achilles (August 6, 1892 – March 1989), was an American psychologist known for her contributions to school and clinical psychology, particularly in the areas of memory development and recognition in children. Her experimental work on recall and recognition helped contribute to psychological assessment practices for immigrant children in the early 20th century. Her career included academic, clinical, and organizational contributions to psychology both in the United States and abroad.

== Early life and education ==
Edith Frances Mulhall Achilles was born August 6, 1892, in Boston, Massachusetts. Details of her early life are scarce, but she began her formal education at Barnard College, earning a B.S. in 1914. She continues her studies at Columbia University, receiving an A.M. in 1915 and Ph.D. in psychology in 1918.

In 1917, while pursuing her Ph.D., she married Paul Strong Achilles, a fellow psychology student at Columbia University. The couple had one daughter. Although they later divorced in the 1930s, both remained active in the field of psychology.

== Career ==
After completing her Ph.D., she began teaching at Columbia University, where she focused on experimental psychology, particularly recall and recognition in children. Her early research culminated in the publication of Experimental Studies in Recall and Recognition (1920), a significant work that examined the cognitive mechanisms behind memory retrieval. She later worked at the Psychological Corporation, a major organization involved in the development and application of psychological testing, which was directed by her former husband, Paul Achilles, from 1932 to 1946. Despite his more prominent public role, Edith’s own research and contributions remained notable, especially in educational psychology and cross cultural testing. She also served as a consultant at Oxford University and remained involved in academic administration, acting as a trustee of her alma mater, Barnard College, for several years.

== Research and contributions ==
Edith’s most cited work, Experimental Studies in Recall and Recognition (1920), explored how children and adults retrieve information, and how recognition differs from active recall, which is a foundational distinction in memory research. Her research anticipated later work in cognitive development and educational assessment. In 1935, she co-authored A Report of the Special Committee on Immigration and Naturalization of the Chamber of Commerce of the State of New York Submitting a Study on Reactions of Puerto Rican Children in New York City to Psychological Tests alongside Clairette Papin Armstrong and M.J. Sacks. This report, commissioned by the Chamber of Commerce of the State of New York, studied the reactions of Puerto Rican children to psychological tests, highlighting early efforts to understand cultural and linguistic biases in psychological measurement.

== Legacy ==
While much of her career was overshadowed by her former husband’s more public role in organizational psychology, Edith Achilles’ early work in cognitive development, test design, and cross-cultural assessment laid groundwork for future research in child psychology. Her contributions continue to be recognized in historical accounts of women in science. The Edith and Frances Mulhall Achilles Memorial Fund headquartered in New York has given over $665k in grants in 2023 alone, and has given more grants every year since its creation in the early 2000s. Some of the grants are given to students at Bernard college, and some are given to historical societies and museums in the New York area, to foster growth and development in Edith Achilles’ name.

== See also ==
- Developmental psychology
- Memory development
- School psychology
- Clinical psychology
- Psychological research and Psychological research methods
