= Horace Bonham =

American painter (1835–1892)

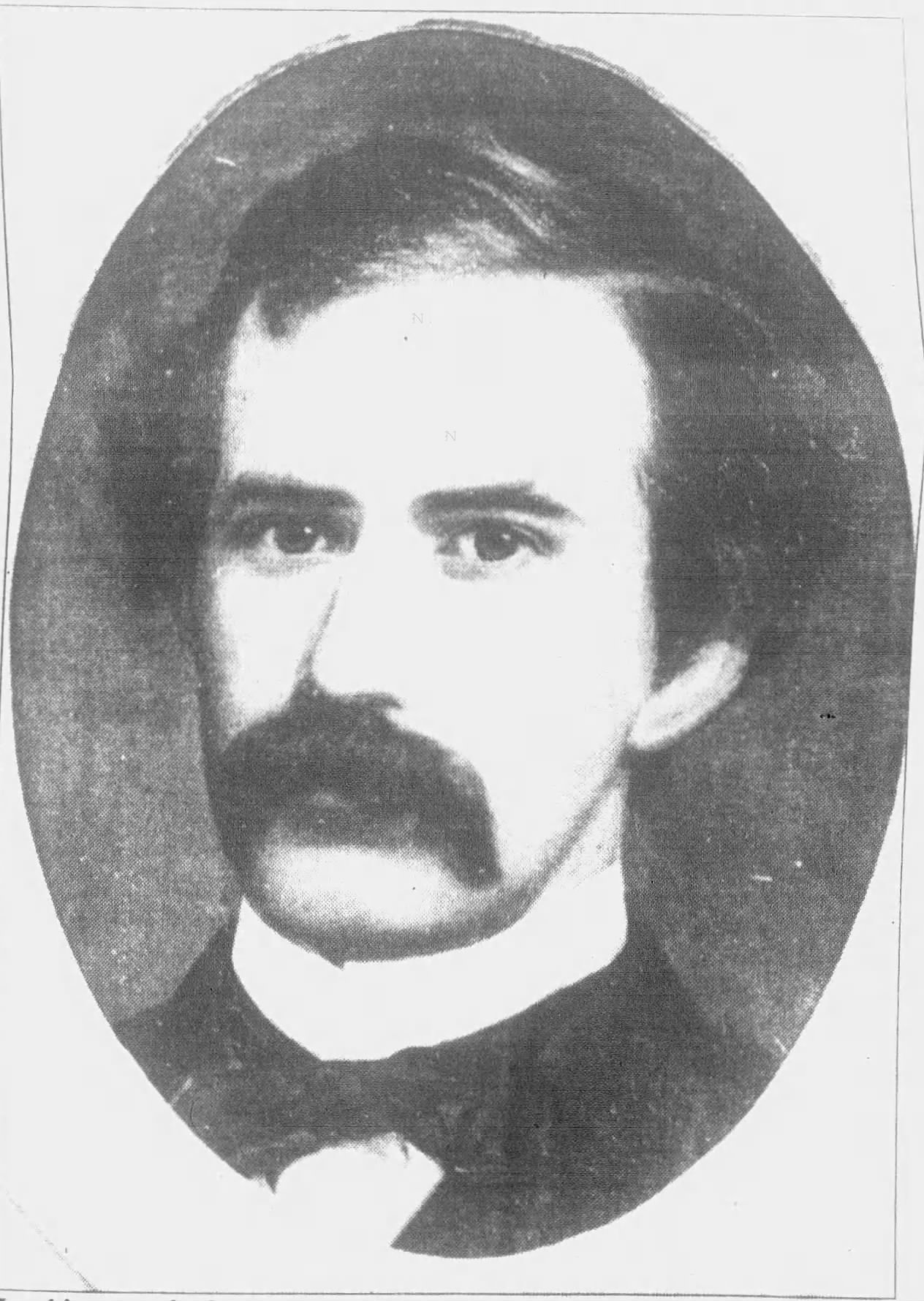
- Self-portrait (1873)
- Born: November 26, 1835
- Died: March 7, 1892 (aged 56)

Horace Bonham (November 26, 1835–March 7, 1892) was a 19th-century American painter. He was the well-educated son of a judge, and passed the bar but never practiced law. He worked as a newspaper editor, and as a revenue agent during the American Civil War, and then took up the study and practice of oil painting. Bonham remains "little-known." His most famous work is Nearing the Issue at the Cockpit, which is in the collection of the Corcoran Gallery in Washington, D.C. He spent most of his life, except for a grand tour of Europe, in southeastern Pennsylvania. Most of his work was never sold commercially and is now held at a historic house museum in his hometown of York, Pennsylvania, with a few works in the hands of private collectors.

== Biography ==
Bonham was born a twin in York, Pennsylvania, which lies between Harrisburg, Pennsylvania, and Baltimore, Maryland, in the Susquehanna River valley. His twin was John Milton Bonham. His father was a farmer and a county judge, Samuel Bonham. His grandfather Absolom Bonham was a soldier in the American Revolutionary War. Bonham and his brother went to York County Academy, and a prep school called Wesleyan Institute in Middletown, New York. He started at Yale (his brother went to Princeton), but he came down with typhoid and then erisypelas. When finally recovered, he went to Lafayette College (outside Allentown, Pennsylvania), graduating in 1856. Bonham passed the bar exam in 1859. He never practiced law.

In 1861, he founded the York Republican newspaper and worked as its editor, but lacking for advertising, it failed after two months. During the American Civil War he worked as an assessor for the United States Revenue service. He later went to London, Cologne, Florence, Rome and Munich, to study painting, and wrote letters about those cities for the Philadelphia Press newspaper.

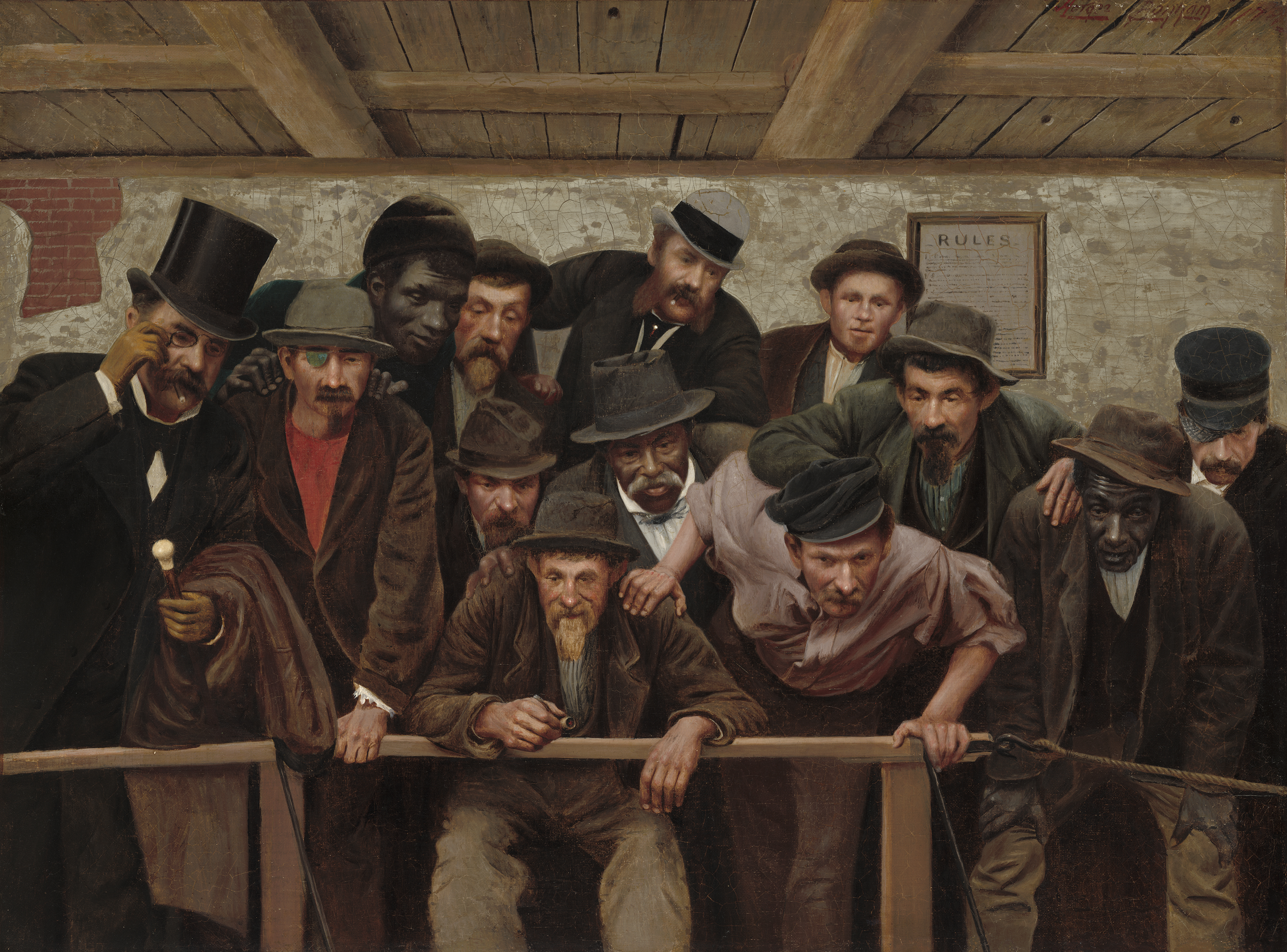
Nearing the Issue at the Cockpit, 1879

He exhibited paintings at juried art shows in Boston, New York City, and Philadelphia. He often painted local subjects, with researcher Carol Kearney noting, "Bonham's drawings of the people at the farmer's markets shows York's evolution from a rural Pennsylvania-German town to a cosmopolitan place with a strong English influence. He painted American blacks. He was one of the few painters of the period to show integrated scenes." His work in oil paints includes Susquehanna landscapes but his subject matter is predominantly scenes of daily life. He also worked in pen and ink, including portraits of "Dixie Pluffer, a street person who might have hung out in the market sheds on the square, and Billy Bullfrog, a scissors sharpener who probably lived in Bullfrog Alley, and Squire Braxton, who had been a slave in Virginia in 1837." Nearing the Issue at the Cockpit has been compared to The County Election by George Caleb Bingham, with art historian Barbara Groseclose suggesting both are intended as visual critiques of the American body politic. Bonham has been grouped with Thomas Eakins, Winslow Homer, and George Bellows, as a White American painter who chose to paint Black portraiture rather than Black caricature. One 1967 essay by an art critic regretted that there was not more research into the work of "mid-century academic genre painters" like Bonham, Richard Caton Woodville, and Charles F. Ulrich.

Bonham died in 1892 from what was believed to be a stroke subsequent to Bright's disease. His twin brother died in 1897. Horace Bonham was a Republican by politics, and an Episcopalian by religion. He was married in 1870, and the couple had four daughters. His wife, Rebekah Lewis Bonham, survived until 1926. Horace and Rebecca's daughter Elizabeth S. Bonham died in 1965, and bequeathed the family home that her parents had bought for $8,565 in 1875 to the York County Historical Society. The York County Heritage Trust operates the Bonham House as a local history museum. Horace Bonham was remembered as "a shy man, by all accounts, an artist, and a poet."

== Sources ==
- Groseclose, Barbara S. (2000). Nineteenth-Century American Art. New York: Oxford University Press. ISBN 978-0-19-284225-1 – via Internet Archive.
