= William Macdonald (historian) =

American historian (1863–1938)

William Macdonald (July 31, 1863 - December 15, 1938) was an American historian and journalist.

William Macdonald was from Providence, Rhode Island. He attended Harvard University, where he received a Bachelor of Arts in 1892. In 1895 he received an honorary doctorate from Union College. Macdonald's first professorship was in history and economics at Worcester Polytechnic Institute from 1892 to 1893, and he then went to Bowdoin College from 1893 to 1801 as a professor of political science and history. From 1901 to 1917 Macdonald was a professor of history at Brown University. Macdonald was elected a member of the American Antiquarian Society in 1902. In 1917 Macdonald resigned from Brown while on sabbatical in France. While in France he became a special foreign correspondent for The Nation and was an associate editor for the paper from 1918 to 1920. Macdonald was also an editorial writer for The Freeman and Commercial and Financial Chronicle. Macdonald gave lectures at the University of California in 1917 and 1918, and gave lectures as a visiting professor at Yale University from 1924 to 1926.

Macdonald died on December 15, 1938, in New York City.
