= Pawtucket Congregational Church =

Historic church in Rhode Island, United States

- U.S. National Register of Historic Places
- U.S. Historic district – Contributing property
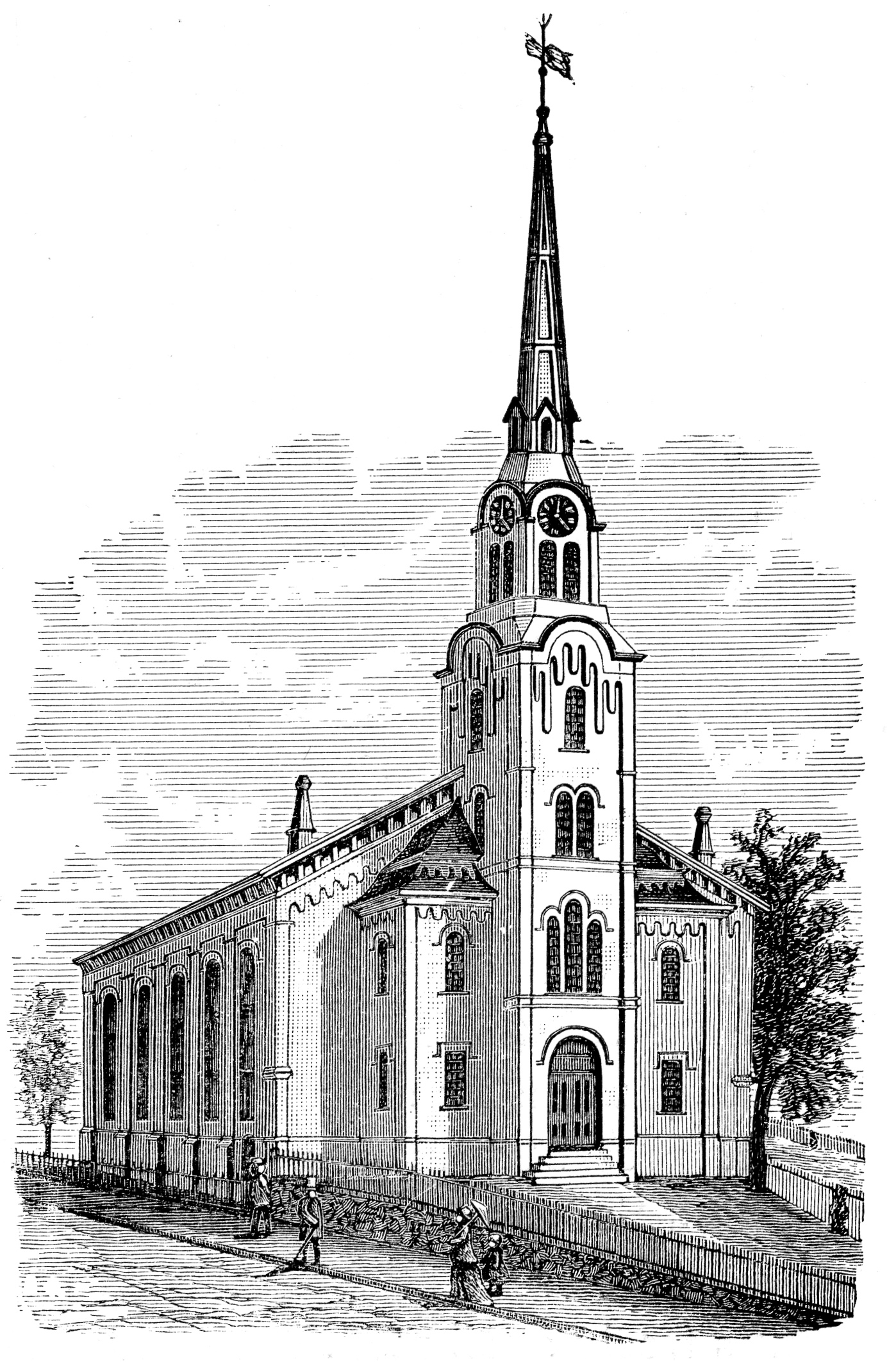
- 1886 engraving

- Location within Rhode Island Location within the United States
- Location: Pawtucket, Rhode Island
- Coordinates: 41°52′36″N 71°22′54″W
- Built: 1867
- Architect: John Stevens
- Architectural style: Italianate, Romanesque
- Part of: Quality Hill Historic District (ID84002041)
- NRHP reference No.: 78000004

Significant dates
- Added to NRHP: September 18, 1978
- Designated CP: April 13, 1984

The Pawtucket Congregational Church (now known as The Temple of Restoration Pentecostal Church) is an historic church building at 40 and 56 Walcott Street, at the junction of Broadway and Walcott St., in the Quality Hill neighborhood of Pawtucket, Rhode Island.

== History ==
Early in the town's history, the Baptists lived mainly on the west side of the river, and attended church services in Providence. The Congregationalists on the east side of the river attended services at the Newman Congregational Church three miles away in Rehoboth (now East Providence). The Congregationalists established their own Pawtucket Congregational Church on April 17, 1829, with nine members: eight women and one man. The first pastor was the Rev. Asa T. Hopkins. The congregation's first church was destroyed by fire in 1864.

The Italianate/Romanesque style church building was designed by Boston, Massachusetts architect John Stevens (not to be confused with John Calvin Stevens) and constructed in 1867–1868; it is the only known work of Stevens in Rhode Island. The cost of construction was $64,000. By 1886 the congregation numbered 300 members. Members of the church included wealthy mill owners from Pawtucket and neighboring Central Falls, such as Darius Goff and Daniel Littlefield. In 1936 a Colonial Revival parish house was built behind the church, to designs by local architects Monahan & Meikle.

The church has been active in the community and leased a building to the first Rhode Island Children's Museum from the 1970s to 1990s. The church's main building was added to the National Register of Historic Places in 1978.

Since 2012, the church has been known as The Temple of Restoration Pentecostal Church, hosting a bilingual congregation.

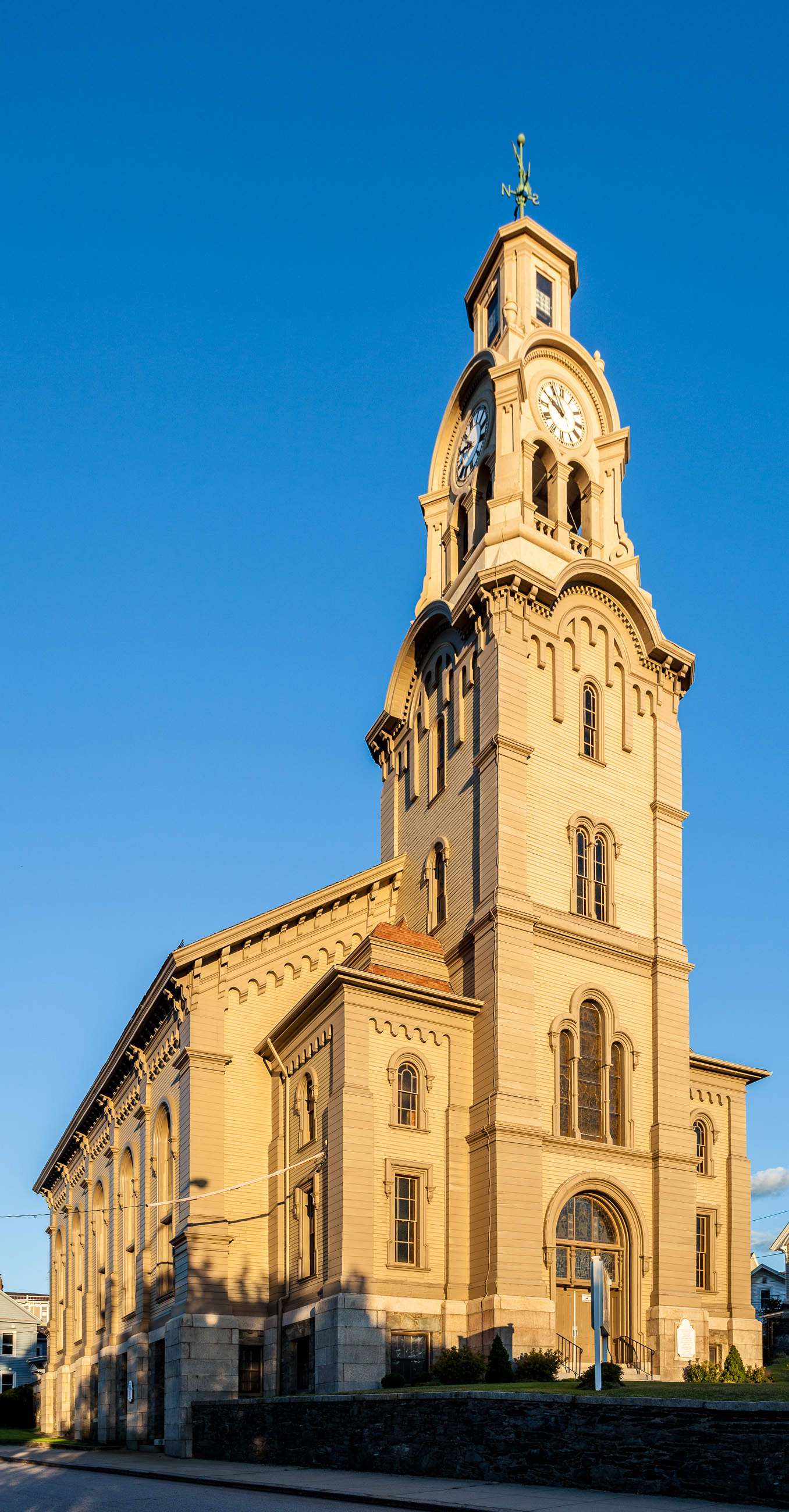
Temple of Restoration, formerly Pawtucket Congregational Church, in 2012

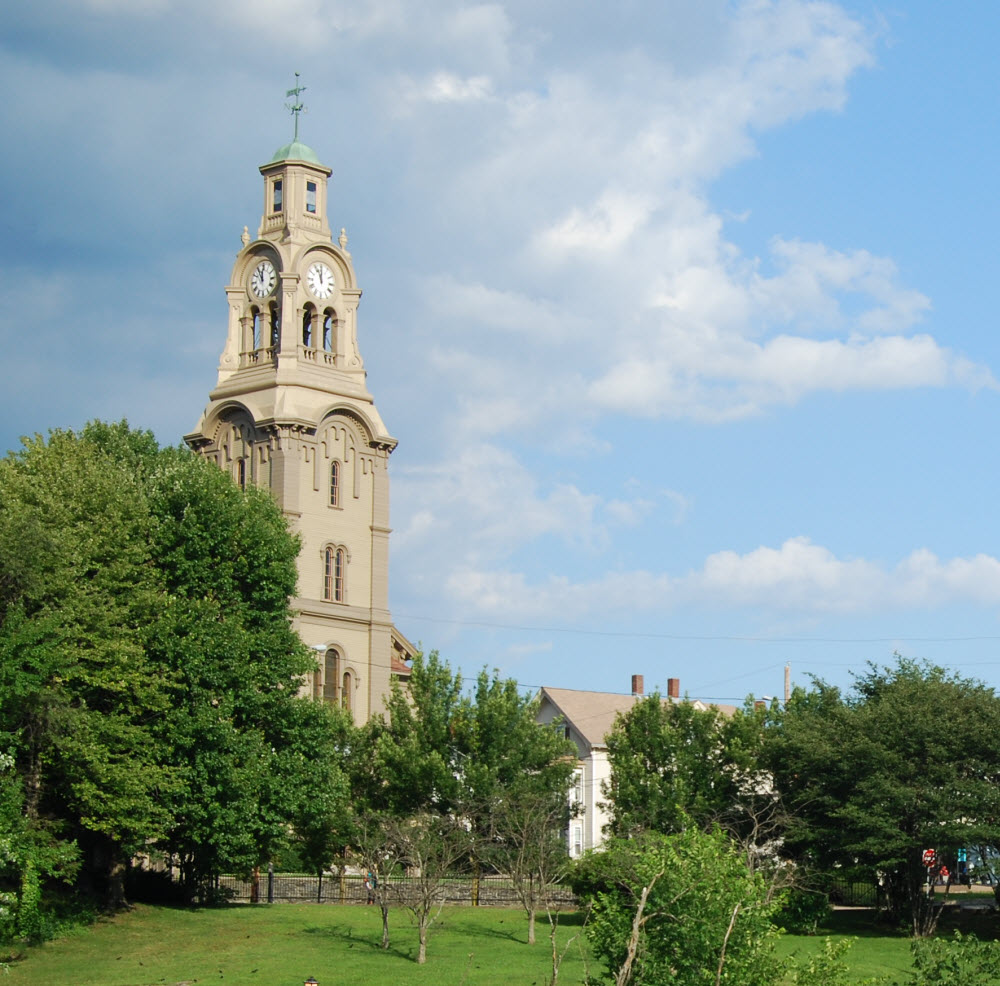
Another view

== See also ==
- National Register of Historic Places listings in Pawtucket, Rhode Island
