= East Natick, Rhode Island =

Village in Rhode Island, US

Coordinates: 41°43′07″N 71°28′55″W

- Village
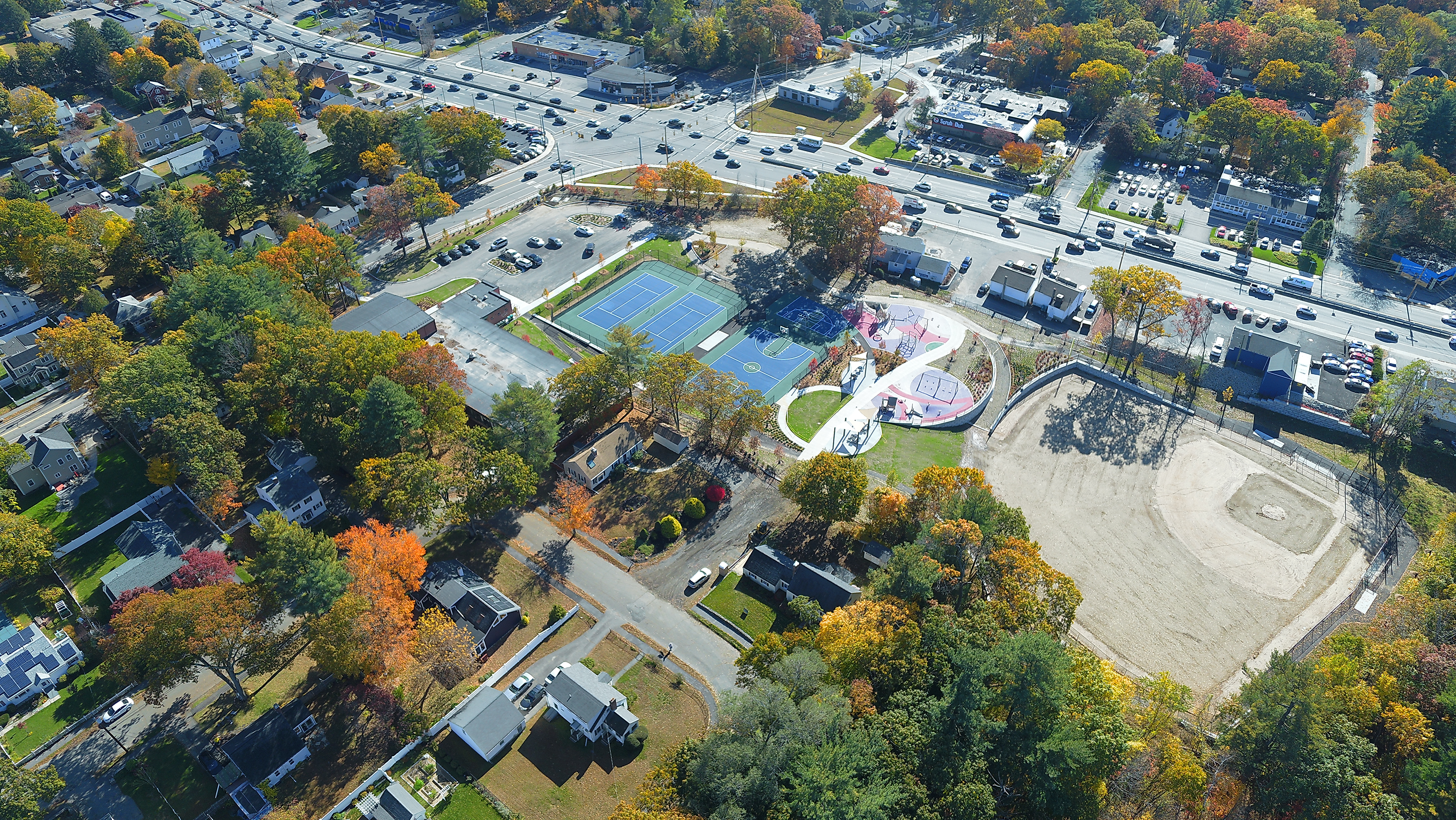
- Country: United States
- State: Rhode Island
- County: Kent

East Natick is a small village in Warwick, Rhode Island. It is centered on the intersection of Bald Hill Road and East Avenue.

The village is separated from Natick proper by the railroad (now the Washington Secondary Trail), and the Pawtuxet River. The other nearby village is Pontiac, which is northerly across the Pawtuxet.

== History ==
East Natick was home to many industrial workers, who worked in the mills of nearby Natick. Examples of traditional Rhode Island mill housing can be seen in the northerly part in the village. One of the most interesting buildings here is that of the Warwick Ice Cream Company, founded 1930. Built in 1940, it is one of only a few examples of Art Deco architecture in Warwick. It was designed by Providence architect Francis Chiaverini. There is a colonial era farmhouse at 697 East Avenue.

East Natick is home to two prominent Rhode Island institutions: the Community College of Rhode Island and the Rhode Island Mall.

CCRI is located on the grounds of the former Knight Estate, owned by first the Spragues and then the Knights, major manufacturing families. The main house, still standing at 486 East Avenue, is believed to have been built by William Sprague between 1827 and his death in 1836. The estate was later donated to the state, and the Rhode Island Junior College, now CCRI, opened there in 1972.

The Rhode Island Mall, originally the Midland Mall, opened in 1967. Much of the building is currently vacant.
