= Daniel Russell Brown =

43rd Governor of Rhode Island

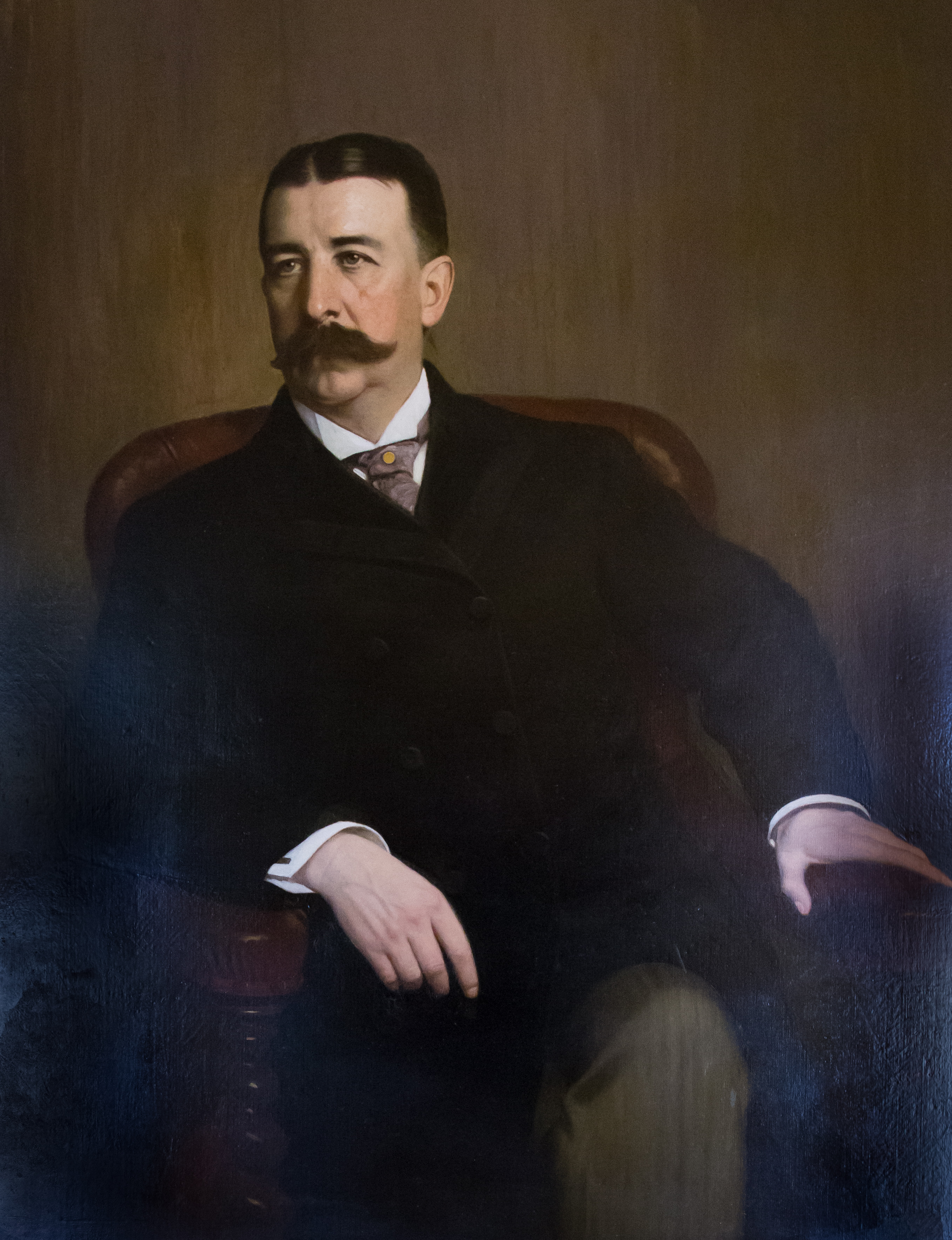
- Official portrait by Jared Bradley Flagg

43rd Governor of Rhode Island
- In office May 31, 1892 – May 29, 1895
- Lieutenant: Melville Bull; Edwin Allen
- Preceded by: Herbert W. Ladd
- Succeeded by: Charles W. Lippitt

Personal details
- Born: March 28, 1848 Bolton, Connecticut, U.S.
- Died: February 28, 1919 (aged 70)
- Resting place: Swan Point Cemetery
- Profession: Politician

Daniel Russell Brown (March 28, 1848 – February 28, 1919) was an American politician and the 43rd governor of Rhode Island.

== Early life ==
D. Russell Brown was born in Bolton, Connecticut, United States, on March 28, 1848. He was son of Arba Harrison Brown and Harriet M. (Dart) Brown. He went to public schools and worked his way up to head salesman at a hardware store in Hartford, then moved to Providence, Rhode Island, where he became partner in a mill supply store. He married Isabel Barrows October 14, 1874. They had three children, Milton Barrows Brown, Isabel Russell Brown (later Brunschwig), and Hope Caroline Brown (later Chapin). Hope was honeymooning on the British ocean liner RMS Carpathia in April 1912, when this vessel took on the survivors of the RMS Titanic.

== Political career ==
Brown was a Presidential Elector for Rhode Island in 1888. He was a member of the Providence City Council for four years before he ran for governor. He won the first election by popular vote, was then reelected by the General Assembly the next year, when no candidate reached the required majority, and won the popular vote again in his third gubernatorial election. He held the governor's office from May 31, 1892, to May 29, 1895. In his last term, he played a key role in the adoption of a constitutional amendment that permitted election by a plurality rather than a majority vote. He was suggested as vice presidential candidate at the Republican National Convention of 1896, having the support of New England, but was not selected.

He was an active member of the Freemasons. In 1891, he became a member of the Rhode Island Society of the Sons of the American Revolution.

He died on February 28, 1919, and was buried at Swan Point Cemetery in Providence.

== Sources ==
- Sobel, Robert and John Raimo. Biographical Directory of the Governors of the United States, 1789-1978. Greenwood Press, 1988. ISBN 0-313-28093-2

Party political offices
Preceded by Herbert W. Ladd	Republican nominee for Governor of Rhode Island; 1892, 1893, 1894	Succeeded by Charles W. Lippitt
Political offices
Preceded by Herbert W. Ladd	Governor of Rhode Island; 1892–1895	Succeeded by Charles W. Lippitt
