= 1968 in the United States =

- Decades: 1940s; 1950s; 1960s; 1970s; 1980s
- See also: History of the United States (1964–1980); Timeline of United States history (1950–1969); List of years in the United States

1968 in the United States was marked by several major historical events. It is often considered to be one of the most turbulent and traumatic years of the 20th century in the United States.

The year began with relative peace until January 21 when the North Vietnamese Army PAVN attacked the Marine base at Khe Sanh Combat Base Quang Tri Province, Vietnam. This was the beginning of the Battle of Khe Sanh and the attack focused US command on Khe Sanh near the DMZ. The initial attack was followed by the North Vietnamese country-wide launch of the Tet Offensive on January 30, resulting in a South Vietnamese-US victory, eliminating the Viet Cong as an effective fighting force. The attack included a North Vietnamese assassination attempt on South Vietnam's president Nguyễn Văn Thiệu which failed. North Vietnam premised the attack on a South Vietnamese uprising against South Vietnam and US forces but this uprising did not occur as the South Vietnamese populace did not rally to the North. Also, on January 23 the North Korean government seized USS Pueblo and its crew of eighty-three in an attempt to divert attention from a failed January 21 assassination attempt on South Korean president Park Chung-hee known as the Blue House raid. In Greenland a B-52 bomber on a Cold War mission known as Operation Chrome Dome crashed with four nuclear bombs on board. One airman was killed. The cleanup operation was informally known as Operation Freezelove, a play on words on the movie Dr. Strangelove.

Four hundred to six thousand civilians and prisoners of war in the city of Huế, Vietnam, deemed political enemies, were either clubbed to death or buried alive by the North Vietnamese Army. This is known as the Massacre at Hue.

The year also saw the highest level of US troop commitment when President Lyndon B. Johnson signed legislation that increased the maximum number of United States troops active on the ground to five hundred and forty-nine thousand and five hundred (549,500). This did not count US forces in the South China Sea, Laos, Cambodia, Thailand, North Vietnam, and China with reserves in the Philippines, Okinawa, Japan, Korea, Guam, Hawaii, the United States, and worldwide totaling over three million (3,000,000). South Vietnam in the same year fielded a total force of eight hundred and twenty thousand troops (820,000). It was also the most expensive year of the war, with a cost of $77.4 billion. The support of the United States for South Vietnam was at its peak. Antiwar sentiment continued to grow as an increasing number of Americans questioned United States involvement in Vietnam, as the United States was drafting young men to fight for South Vietnam while South Vietnam did not have a draft for its own citizens; however, the war continued despite changing US public opinion.

North Vietnam benefited politically from the Tet Offensive when Walter Cronkite, a respected television newscaster, swayed many Americans and President Johnson, by giving his personal opinion on a national prime time editorial: "It is increasingly clear to this reporter that the only rational way out then will be to negotiate, not as victors, but as an honorable people who lived up to their pledge to defend democracy, and did the best they could." This may have marked a transition in journalism where a news reporter became a news and policy maker. President Johnson cited Walter Cronkite's changed opinion as a factor as well as Johnson's poor New Hampshire primary numbers in his decision to stop seeking reelection, stating to his advisers: "If I have lost Cronkite I have lost middle America."

On April 4, civil rights activist Martin Luther King Jr. was assassinated. The United States erupted in violent riots, the most severe of which occurred in Washington, D.C., Chicago, and Baltimore. Extensive areas of these and many other cities were looted, burned, and destroyed by the rioters and more than 40 people were killed during the month of protest, which led to greater racial tensions between Americans. Despite this, a landmark piece of legislation, the Civil Rights Act of 1968, which was President John F. Kennedy's legacy, was passed by the expertise of President Johnson in April. This legislation was passed with bipartisan congressional support and effectively prohibited housing discrimination based on race.

The 1968 United States presidential election became a referendum on the Vietnam War. A peace candidate had previously emerged in the Democratic Party when Senator Eugene McCarthy challenged the Vietnam War policies of President Johnson, who had refused to seek or accept another nomination for president and had endorsed his vice president, Hubert Humphrey, for the Democratic presidential nomination. Senator McCarthy's support came primarily from young people, most of whom were subject to the draft or were in deferred status. This divided the country by age as older citizens, a so-called silent majority, tended to support or not actively oppose government policies. This division of the populace encouraged Senator Robert F. Kennedy to seek the Democratic presidential nomination. Robert F. Kennedy, who was a leading 1968 Democratic presidential candidate, was assassinated after winning the California primary and defeating Senator Eugene McCarthy. The assassination of Robert F. Kennedy in June led to uncertainty in the race for the Democratic nomination for the presidency. After Vice President Humphrey won the Democratic nomination at the 1968 Democratic National Convention in Chicago, another wave of violent protests emerged, this time between the mostly young antiwar demonstrators and police. The uncertainty within the Democratic Party benefited Richard Nixon, a Republican and former vice president, as he successfully won the presidential race by appealing to the "Silent Majority" under the promise "Peace with Honor". Nixon, a staunch anti-communist, had gained the voters' trust. A particularly strong showing by segregationist George Wallace of the American Independent Party in 1968's presidential election highlighted the strong element of racial division that continued to persist across the country.

In popular culture, 2001: A Space Odyssey was the most profitable film of the year, earning $56.7 million, while Oliver! won the Academy Award for Best Picture. "Hey Jude" by the Beatles was the hottest single of 1968 in the U.S. according to Billboard, demonstrating the continued popularity of bands associated with the British Invasion that began in 1964.

== Incumbents ==
=== Federal government ===
- President: Lyndon B. Johnson (D-Texas)
- Vice President: Hubert Humphrey (D-Minnesota)
- Chief Justice: Earl Warren (California)
- Speaker of the House of Representatives: John William McCormack (D-Massachusetts)
- Senate Majority Leader: Mike Mansfield (D-Montana)
- Congress: 90th

==== State governments ====
Governors and lieutenant governors

=== Governors ===
- Governor of Alabama: Lurleen Wallace (Democratic) (until May 7), Albert Brewer (Democratic) (starting May 7)
- Governor of Alaska: Wally Hickel (Republican)
- Governor of Arizona: Jack Richard Williams (Republican)
- Governor of Arkansas: Winthrop Rockefeller (Republican)
- Governor of California: Ronald Reagan (Republican)
- Governor of Colorado: John Arthur Love (Republican)
- Governor of Connecticut: John N. Dempsey (Democratic)
- Governor of Delaware: Charles L. Terry Jr. (Democratic)
- Governor of Florida: Claude R. Kirk Jr. (Republican)
- Governor of Georgia: Lester Maddox (Democratic)
- Governor of Hawaii: John A. Burns (Democratic)
- Governor of Idaho: Don Samuelson (Republican)
- Governor of Illinois: Otto Kerner Jr. (Democratic) (until May 21), Samuel H. Shapiro (Democratic) (starting May 21)
- Governor of Indiana: Roger D. Branigin (Democratic)
- Governor of Iowa: Harold E. Hughes (Democratic)
- Governor of Kansas: Robert Docking (Democratic)
- Governor of Kentucky: Louie B. Nunn (Republican)
- Governor of Louisiana: John J. McKeithen (Democratic)
- Governor of Maine: Kenneth M. Curtis (Democratic)
- Governor of Maryland: Spiro Agnew (Republican)
- Governor of Massachusetts: John A. Volpe (Republican)
- Governor of Michigan: George W. Romney (Republican)
- Governor of Minnesota: Harold LeVander (Republican)
- Governor of Mississippi: Paul B. Johnson Jr. (Democratic) (until January 16), John Bell Williams (Democratic) (starting January 16)
- Governor of Missouri: Warren E. Hearnes (Democratic)
- Governor of Montana: Tim M. Babcock (Republican)
- Governor of Nebraska: Norbert T. Tiemann (Republican)
- Governor of Nevada: Paul Laxalt (Republican)
- Governor of New Hampshire: John W. King (Democratic)
- Governor of New Jersey: Richard J. Hughes (Democratic)
- Governor of New Mexico: David F. Cargo (Republican)
- Governor of New York: Nelson Rockefeller (Republican)
- Governor of North Carolina: Dan K. Moore (Democratic)
- Governor of North Dakota: William L. Guy (Democratic)
- Governor of Ohio: Jim Rhodes (Republican)
- Governor of Oklahoma: Dewey F. Bartlett (Republican)
- Governor of Oregon: Tom McCall (Republican)
- Governor of Pennsylvania: Raymond P. Shafer (Republican)
- Governor of Rhode Island: John Chafee (Republican)
- Governor of South Carolina: Robert Evander McNair (Democratic)
- Governor of South Dakota: Nils Boe (Republican)
- Governor of Tennessee: Buford Ellington (Democratic)
- Governor of Texas: John Connally (Democratic)
- Governor of Utah: Cal Rampton (Democratic)
- Governor of Vermont: Philip H. Hoff (Democratic)
- Governor of Virginia: Mills E. Godwin Jr. (Democratic)
- Governor of Washington: Daniel J. Evans (Republican)
- Governor of West Virginia: Hulett C. Smith (Democratic)
- Governor of Wisconsin: Warren P. Knowles (Republican)
- Governor of Wyoming: Stanley K. Hathaway (Republican)

=== Lieutenant governors ===
- Lieutenant Governor of Alabama: Albert Brewer (Democratic) (until May 7), vacant (starting May 7)
- Lieutenant Governor of Alaska: Keith Harvey Miller (Republican)
- Lieutenant Governor of Arkansas: Maurice Britt (Republican)
- Lieutenant Governor of California: Robert Hutchinson Finch (Republican)
- Lieutenant Governor of Colorado: Mark Anthony Hogan (Democratic)
- Lieutenant Governor of Connecticut: Attilio R. Frassinelli (Democratic)
- Lieutenant Governor of Delaware: Sherman W. Tribbitt (Democratic)
- Lieutenant Governor of Georgia: George T. Smith (Democratic)
- Lieutenant Governor of Hawaii: Thomas Gill (Democratic)
- Lieutenant Governor of Idaho: Jack M. Murphy (Democratic)
- Lieutenant Governor of Illinois: Samuel H. Shapiro (Democratic) (until May 21), vacant (starting May 21)
- Lieutenant Governor of Indiana: Robert L. Rock (Democratic)
- Lieutenant Governor of Iowa: Robert D. Fulton (Democratic)
- Lieutenant Governor of Kansas: John Crutcher (Republican)
- Lieutenant Governor of Kentucky: Wendell H. Ford (Democratic)
- Lieutenant Governor of Louisiana: C. C. Aycock (Democratic)
- Lieutenant Governor of Massachusetts: Francis W. Sargent (Republican)
- Lieutenant Governor of Michigan: William G. Milliken (Republican)
- Lieutenant Governor of Minnesota: James B. Goetz (Republican)
- Lieutenant Governor of Mississippi: vacant (until month and day unknown), Charles L. Sullivan (Democratic) (starting month and day unknown)
- Lieutenant Governor of Missouri: Thomas Eagleton (Democratic)
- Lieutenant Governor of Montana: Ted James (Republican)
- Lieutenant Governor of Nebraska: John Everroad (Republican)
- Lieutenant Governor of Nevada: Edward Fike (political party unknown)
- Lieutenant Governor of New Mexico: Elias Lee Francis II (Republican)
- Lieutenant Governor of New York: Malcolm Wilson (Republican)
- Lieutenant Governor of North Carolina: Robert W. Scott (Democratic)
- Lieutenant Governor of North Dakota: Charles Tighe (Democratic)
- Lieutenant Governor of Ohio: John William Brown (Republican)
- Lieutenant Governor of Oklahoma: George Nigh (Democratic)
- Lieutenant Governor of Pennsylvania: Raymond J. Broderick (Republican)
- Lieutenant Governor of Rhode Island: Joseph O'Donnell Jr. (Republican)
- Lieutenant Governor of South Carolina: John C. West (Democratic)
- Lieutenant Governor of South Dakota: Lem Overpeck (Republican)
- Lieutenant Governor of Tennessee: Frank Gorrell (Democratic)
- Lieutenant Governor of Texas: Preston Smith (Democratic)
- Lieutenant Governor of Vermont: John J. Daley (Democratic)
- Lieutenant Governor of Virginia: Fred G. Pollard (Democratic)
- Lieutenant Governor of Washington: John Cherberg (Democratic)
- Lieutenant Governor of Wisconsin: Jack B. Olson (Republican)

== Events ==
=== January ===
- January 2 – The Dow Jones Industrial Average is 906.4.
- January 5 – The United States indicts Benjamin Spock, a famous pediatrician and author, for conspiracy to violate the draft laws. Spock's indictment is set aside in 1969.
- January 6
  - N. E. Shumway performs the first adult cardiac transplant operation in the U.S.
  - Surveyor 7, the last of the series of uncrewed probes, is launched by the U.S. for soft-landing on the Moon.
- January 7 – First-class US postage is raised from 5 cents to 6 cents. US Prime rate is 6%.
- January 13 – Johnny Cash records At Folsom Prison live at Folsom State Prison, California.
- January 14 – The Green Bay Packers win Super Bowl II.
- January 17 – Lyndon B. Johnson calls for the non-conversion of the U.S. dollar.
- January 18 – The Soviet Union performs a nuclear test at Eastern Kazakh/Semipalatinsk.
- January 19 – At a White House conference on crime, singer and actress Eartha Kitt denounces the Vietnam War to Lady Bird Johnson while attending a "ladies' lunch".
- January 21
  - Battle of Khe Sanh in Vietnam begins.
  - 1968 Thule Air Base B-52 crash: A U.S. B-52 Stratofortress crashes in Greenland carrying four nuclear bombs which do not explode.
- January 22 – Rowan & Martin's Laugh-In debuts on NBC. This launches the career of Goldie Hawn, who becomes an instant sensation.
- January 23 – North Korea seizes USS Pueblo, claiming the ship invaded its territorial waters while spying.
- January 30 – The Viet Cong of North Vietnam launch the Tet Offensive against South Vietnam, the United States and their allies.
- January 31 – Viet Cong soldiers attack the Embassy of the United States, Saigon. Their leaders are killed by the two United States Military Police on duty at the gate. The 101st Airborne lands on the embassy roof and eliminates the remaining leaderless soldiers.

=== February ===
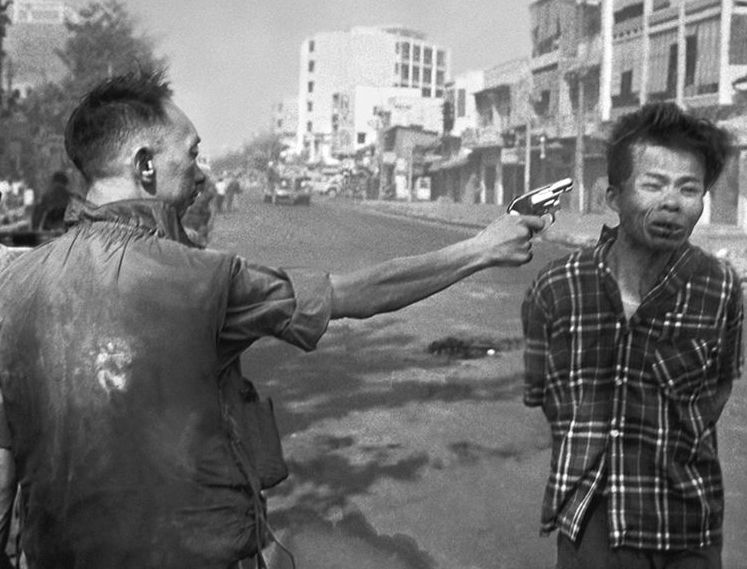
The execution of Nguyễn Văn Lém

- February 1
  - Vietnam War: a Viet Cong officer named Nguyễn Văn Lém is executed by Nguyễn Ngọc Loan, a South Vietnamese National Police Chief. The event is photographed by Eddie Adams. The photo makes headlines around the world, eventually winning the 1969 Pulitzer Prize, and sways U.S. public opinion against the war.
  - The Pennsylvania Railroad and the New York Central Railroad merge to form Penn Central, the largest ever corporate merger up to this date.
- February 8 – Civil rights movement, Orangeburg Massacre: a civil rights demonstration on a college campus to protest racial segregation at a bowling alley in Orangeburg, South Carolina is broken up by highway patrolmen; three African American students are killed, the first instance of police killing student protestors at an American campus.
- February 11 – Madison Square Garden in New York City opens.
- February 12 – Memphis sanitation strike: Provoked by the crushing to death of two black workers, over 1,000 black waste collectors in Memphis, Tennessee, begin a strike that lasts until April 16.
- February 13 – Civil rights disturbances occur at the University of Wisconsin–Madison and the University of North Carolina at Chapel Hill.
- February 16 – The first 9-1-1 call is made by Alabama senator Rankin Fite in Haleyville, Alabama.
- February 19
  - The Florida Education Association (FEA) initiates a mass resignation of teachers to protest state funding of education. This is, in effect, the first statewide teachers' strike in the U.S.
  - NET televises the very first episode of Mister Rogers' Neighborhood.
- February 28 – The influential American news reporter Walter Cronkite shows his disdain for the Vietnam War effort during a broadcast, which influences President Johnson not to seek another term.
- February 29 – The Kerner Commission releases its final report on the causes of the 1967 race riots.

=== March ===
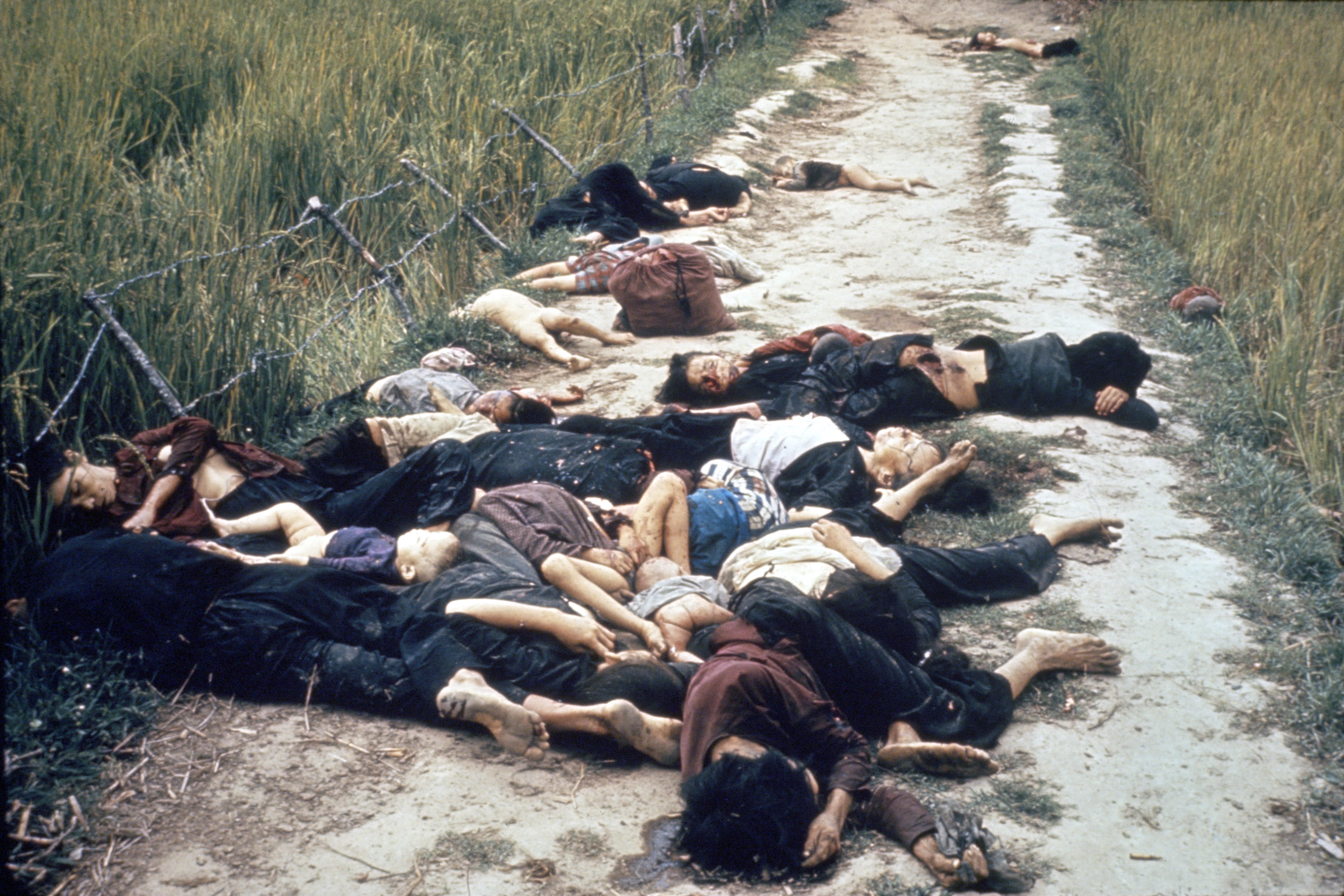
March 16: My Lai Massacre

- March 11 – U.S. president Lyndon B. Johnson mandates that all computers purchased by the federal government support ASCII character encoding.
- March 12 – U.S. president Lyndon B. Johnson edges out antiwar candidate Eugene J. McCarthy in the New Hampshire Democratic primary, a vote which highlights the deep divisions in the country, as well as the party, over Vietnam.
- March 14 – Nerve gas leaks from the U.S. Army Dugway Proving Ground near Skull Valley, Utah.
- March 16
  - Vietnam War – My Lai massacre: American troops kill scores of civilians. The story will first become public in November 1969 and will help undermine public support for the U.S. efforts in Vietnam.
  - U.S. senator Robert F. Kennedy enters the race for the Democratic Party presidential nomination.
- March 17 – A demonstration in London's Grosvenor Square against U.S. involvement in the Vietnam War leads to violence; 91 people are injured and 200 demonstrators are arrested.
- March 18 – Gold standard: the Congress of the United States repeals the requirement for a gold reserve to back U.S. currency.
- March 19–23 – Afrocentrism, Black power, Vietnam War: students at Howard University in Washington, D.C. signal a new era of militant student activism on college campuses in the U.S. Students stage rallies, protests, and a 5-day sit-in. Students lay siege to the administration building, shut down the university in protest over its ROTC program and the Vietnam War, and demand a more Afrocentric curriculum.
- March 21 – Vietnam War: in ongoing campus unrest, Howard University students protesting the Vietnam War, the ROTC program on campus, and the draft, confront Gen. Lewis Hershey, then head of the U.S. Selective Service System, and as he attempts to deliver an address, there are shouting cries of "America is the Black man's battleground!"
- March 26 – Joan Baez marries activist David Harris in New York.
- March 31 – U.S. president Lyndon B. Johnson announces he will not seek re-election in the 1968 presidential election.

=== April ===
- April 2
  - The film 2001: A Space Odyssey premieres in Washington, D.C.
  - In a television special broadcast on NBC, white British singer Petula Clark touches black American singer Harry Belafonte affectionately on the arm.
- April 3
  - Civil rights activist Martin Luther King Jr. delivers his "I've Been to the Mountaintop" speech at Mason Temple in Memphis, Tennessee.
  - Planet of the Apes is released in theaters.
- April 4
  - Martin Luther King Jr. is shot dead at the Lorraine Motel in Memphis, Tennessee. In response, riots erupt in major American cities, lasting for several days afterward.
  - Apollo Program: Apollo 6 is launched, the second and last uncrewed test flight of the Saturn V launch vehicle.
- April 5 – Robert F. Kennedy gives a speech at the Cleveland City Club.
- April 6
  - A shootout between Black Panthers and Oakland police results in several arrests and deaths, including 17-year-old Panther Bobby Hutton.
  - A double explosion in downtown Richmond, Indiana kills 41 and injures 150.
- April 10 – The 40th Academy Awards ceremony, hosted by Bob Hope, is held at Santa Monica Civic Auditorium. Norman Jewison's In the Heat of the Night wins five awards, including Best Picture, while Mike Nichols wins Best Director for The Graduate. Arthur Penn's Bonnie and Clyde and Stanley Kramer's Guess Who's Coming to Dinner both receive ten nominations each.
- April 11 – U.S. president Lyndon B. Johnson signs the Civil Rights Act of 1968.
- April 23–30 – Vietnam War, Columbia University protests of 1968: student protesters at Columbia University in New York City take over administration buildings and shut down the university.
- April 29 – The musical Hair officially opens on Broadway.

=== May ===
- May 14 – The Beatles announce the creation of Apple Records in a New York press conference.
- May 15 – An outbreak of severe thunderstorms produces tornadoes causing massive damage and heavy casualties in Charles City, Iowa, Oelwein, Iowa, and Jonesboro, Arkansas.
- May 17 – The Catonsville Nine enter the Selective Service offices in Catonsville, Maryland, take dozens of selective service draft records, and burn them with napalm as a protest against the Vietnam War.
- May 22 – The U.S. nuclear-powered submarine Scorpion sinks with 99 men aboard, 400 miles southwest of the Azores.

=== June ===
- June 3 – Radical feminist Valerie Solanas shoots Andy Warhol at his New York City studio, The Factory; he survives after a 5-hour operation.
- June 5 – Leading 1968 Democratic presidential candidate Robert F. Kennedy is shot at the Ambassador Hotel in Los Angeles, California, by Sirhan Sirhan. Kennedy dies from his injuries the next day.
- June 8 – James Earl Ray is arrested for the assassination of Martin Luther King Jr. in April.
- June 26 – Bonin Islands are returned to Japan after 23 years of occupation by the United States Navy.
- June 30 – The Lockheed C-5 Galaxy heavy military transport aircraft first flies in the U.S. This model will still be in service 50 years later.

=== July ===
- July 1 – The Central Intelligence Agency's Phoenix Program against the Viet Cong is officially established.
- July 15 – Soap opera One Life to Live premieres on ABC television.
- July 18 – The semiconductor company Intel is founded.
- July 20 – The Special Olympics World Summer Games are held in Chicago.
- July 25- Tysons Corner Center opens, becoming one of the first fully enclosed climate-controlled malls.
- July 23–28 – Black militants led by Fred Evans engage in a fierce gunfight with police in the Glenville Shootout of Cleveland, Ohio.

=== August ===
- August 5–8 – The Republican National Convention in Miami Beach, Florida nominates Richard Nixon for U.S. president and Spiro Agnew for vice president.
- August 21 – The Medal of Honor is posthumously awarded to James Anderson Jr.; he is the first black U.S. Marine to be awarded the Medal of Honor.
- August 22–30 – Police clash with anti-war protesters in Chicago, Illinois, outside the 1968 Democratic National Convention, which nominates Hubert Humphrey for U.S. president, and Edmund Muskie for vice president.

=== September ===
- September 7
  - 150 women (members of New York Radical Women) arrive in Atlantic City, New Jersey to protest against the Miss America Pageant for being exploitative of women. Led by activist and author Robin Morgan, it is one of the first large demonstrations of Second Wave Feminism as Women's Liberation begins to attract media attention.
  - The Banana Splits Adventure Hour begins airing on NBC. It went on for two seasons, ending on December 13 a year later in the middle of Season 2.
- September 13 – Army Major General Keith L. Ware, a World War II Medal of Honor recipient, is killed when his helicopter is shot down in Vietnam. He is posthumously awarded the Distinguished Service Cross.
- September 20 – Hawaii Five-O debuts on CBS, and eventually becomes the longest-running crime show in television history, until Law & Order overtakes it in 2003.
- September 24 – 60 Minutes debuts on CBS.

=== October ===
- October 1 – Night of the Living Dead premieres in the United States.
- October 2 – North Cascades National Park is established.
- October 7 – At the height of protests against the Vietnam War, José Feliciano performs "The Star-Spangled Banner" at Tiger Stadium in Detroit during Game 5 pre-game ceremonies of the 1968 World Series between the Tigers and the St. Louis Cardinals. His personalized, slow, Latin jazz performance proves highly controversial, opening the door for later interpretations of the national anthem.
- October 8 – Vietnam War, Operation Sealords: United States and South Vietnamese forces launch a new operation in the Mekong Delta.
- October 10 – 1968 World Series: the Detroit Tigers defeat the St. Louis Cardinals in the best of 7 series (4 games to 3) after being down 3 games to 1, completing an unlikely comeback against the heavily favored Cardinals led by the overpowering right-handed pitcher Bob Gibson. The final score of Game 7 is 4–1.
- October 11 – Apollo program: NASA launches Apollo 7, the first crewed Apollo mission (Wally Schirra, Donn Eisele, Walter Cunningham). Mission goals include the first live television broadcast from orbit and testing the lunar module docking maneuver.
- October 14 – Vietnam War: the United States Department of Defense announces that the United States Army and United States Marines will send about 24,000 troops back to Vietnam for involuntary second tours.
- October 16 – In Mexico City, Tommie Smith and John Carlos, two black Americans competing in the Olympic 200-meter run, raise their arms in a black power salute after winning, respectively, the gold and bronze medals for 1st and 3rd place.
- October 20 – Former U.S. first lady Jacqueline Kennedy marries Greek shipping tycoon Aristotle Onassis on the Greek island of Skorpios.
- October 25 – The Jimi Hendrix Experience releases Electric Ladyland.
- October 31 – Vietnam War: citing progress in the Paris peace talks, U.S. president Lyndon B. Johnson announces to the nation that he has ordered a complete cessation of "all air, naval, and artillery bombardment of North Vietnam" effective November 1.

=== November ===
- November 5
  - U.S. presidential election, 1968: Republican challenger Richard M. Nixon defeats the Democratic candidate, Vice President Hubert Humphrey, and American Independent Party candidate George C. Wallace.
  - Luis A. Ferre is elected Governor of Puerto Rico.
- November 11 – Vietnam War: Operation Commando Hunt is initiated to interdict men and supplies on the Ho Chi Minh Trail, through Laos into South Vietnam. By the end of the operation, 3 million tons of bombs are dropped on Laos, slowing but not seriously disrupting trail operations.
- November 12 – A mere 39 days before the Apollo 8 spaceflight, NASA Headquarters reveals to the public that the three-man crew would travel to and orbit the moon for Christmas, the first people ever to do so.
- November 14 – Yale University announces it is going to admit women.
- November 16 – The crew of Apollo 8 holds a news conference in the auditorium of the Manned Spacecraft Center in Houston to describe their forthcoming historic moon mission and to answer reporters' questions.
- November 17 – The Heidi game: NBC cuts off the final 1:05 of an Oakland Raiders–New York Jets football game to broadcast the pre-scheduled TV film Heidi. Fans are unable to see Oakland (which had been trailing 32–29) score 2 late touchdowns to win 43–32; as a result, thousands of outraged football fans flood the NBC switchboards to protest.
- November 20 – The Farmington Mine Disaster in Farmington, West Virginia, kills 78 men.
- November 24 – Four men hijack Pan Am Flight 281 from JFK International Airport, New York to Havana, Cuba.
- November 26 – Vietnam War: United States Air Force First Lieutenant and Bell UH-1F helicopter pilot James P. Fleming rescues an Army Special Forces unit pinned down by Viet Cong fire, earning a Medal of Honor for his bravery.

=== December ===
- December 3 – The 50-minute television special Elvis airs on NBC marking the comeback of Elvis Presley after seven years during which the legendary rock and roll musician's career has centered on the movie industry. It is the highest-rated television special of the year.
- December 6 – During an airing of Rudolph The Red Nosed Reindeer, NBC renews The Banana Splits Adventure Hour for a second season.
- December 8 – NBC airs Pinocchio, starring Burl Ives and Peter Noone as part of Hallmark Hall of Fame.
- December 9 – Douglas Engelbart publicly demonstrates his pioneering hypertext system, NLS, in San Francisco.
- December 11 –
  - The film Oliver!, based on the hit London and Broadway musical, opens in the U.S. after being released first in England. It goes on to win the Academy Award for Best Picture.
  - The Rolling Stones Rock and Roll Circus is filmed on this date, but not released until 1996.
- December 20 – The Zodiac Killer is believed to have shot Betty Lou Jensen and David Faraday in Benicia, California, his first confirmed victims.
- December 21 – Apollo 8 and its crew of three launches toward the Moon.
- December 22 – David Eisenhower marries Julie Nixon, the daughter of President-elect Richard Nixon.
- December 23 – The crew of USS Pueblo are released after spending 11 months in captivity by the North Koreans.
- December 24 – Apollo Program: the Apollo 8 spacecraft enters orbit around the Moon. Astronauts Frank Borman, Jim Lovell and William A. Anders become the first humans to see the far side of the Moon and planet Earth as a whole. The Earthrise photograph is taken. The crew also read from the Book of Genesis for a live television broadcast.
- December 26 – Led Zeppelin make their American debut in Denver.

=== Undated ===
- Cañada College opens in Redwood City, California.
- In or about this year the HIV virus is thought to have first arrived in the U.S.
- United Artists pulls eleven Looney Tunes and Merrie Melodies cartoons in its library from television due to the depiction of racist stereotypes towards African-Americans. These cartoons come to be known as the Censored Eleven.

=== Ongoing ===
- Cold War (1947–1991)
- Space Race (1957–1975)
- Vietnam War, U.S. involvement (1964–1973)

== Births ==
=== January ===
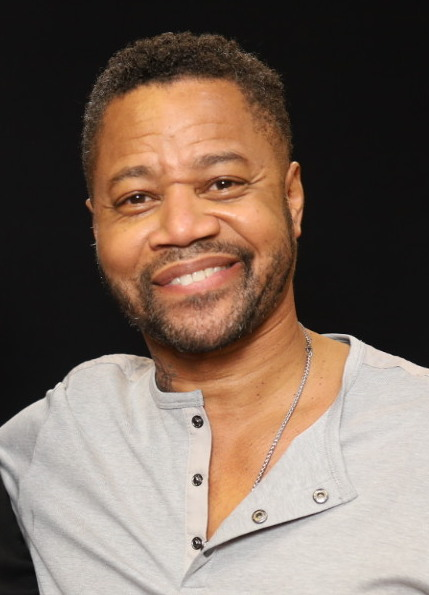
Cuba Gooding Jr.

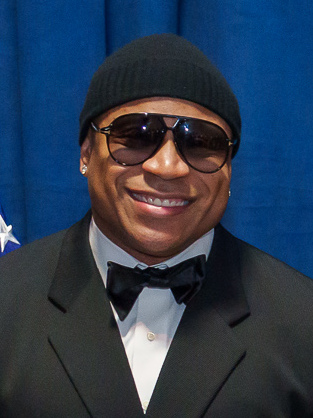
LL Cool J

- January 2 – Cuba Gooding Jr., actor
- January 4 – Mike Wilpolt, football player and coach
- January 5 – Carrie Ann Inaba, choreographer, game show host, and singer
- January 6 – John Singleton, director (d. 2019)
- January 9 – Joey Lauren Adams, actress
- January 10 – Lyle Menendez, convicted murderer
- January 12
  - Farrah Forke, actress (d. 2022)
  - Rachael Harris, actress
- January 14 – LL Cool J, actor, rapper, and songwriter
- January 15 – Chad Lowe, actor
- January 21 – Tom Urbani, baseball player (d. 2022)
- January 22 – Guy Fieri, restaurateur and television personality
- January 23 – Derek Schmidt, politician
- January 24
  - Colleen Doran, author and illustrator
  - Laura Leighton, actress
  - Mary Lou Retton, Olympic Gymnastics
- January 28 – Rakim, rapper and record producer
- January 29
  - Edward Burns, actor, director, and producer
  - Monte Cook, game designer and writer
  - Bobbie Phillips, actress
  - Carmelo Sigona, graffiti artist
  - Aeneas Williams, football player and pastor

=== February ===
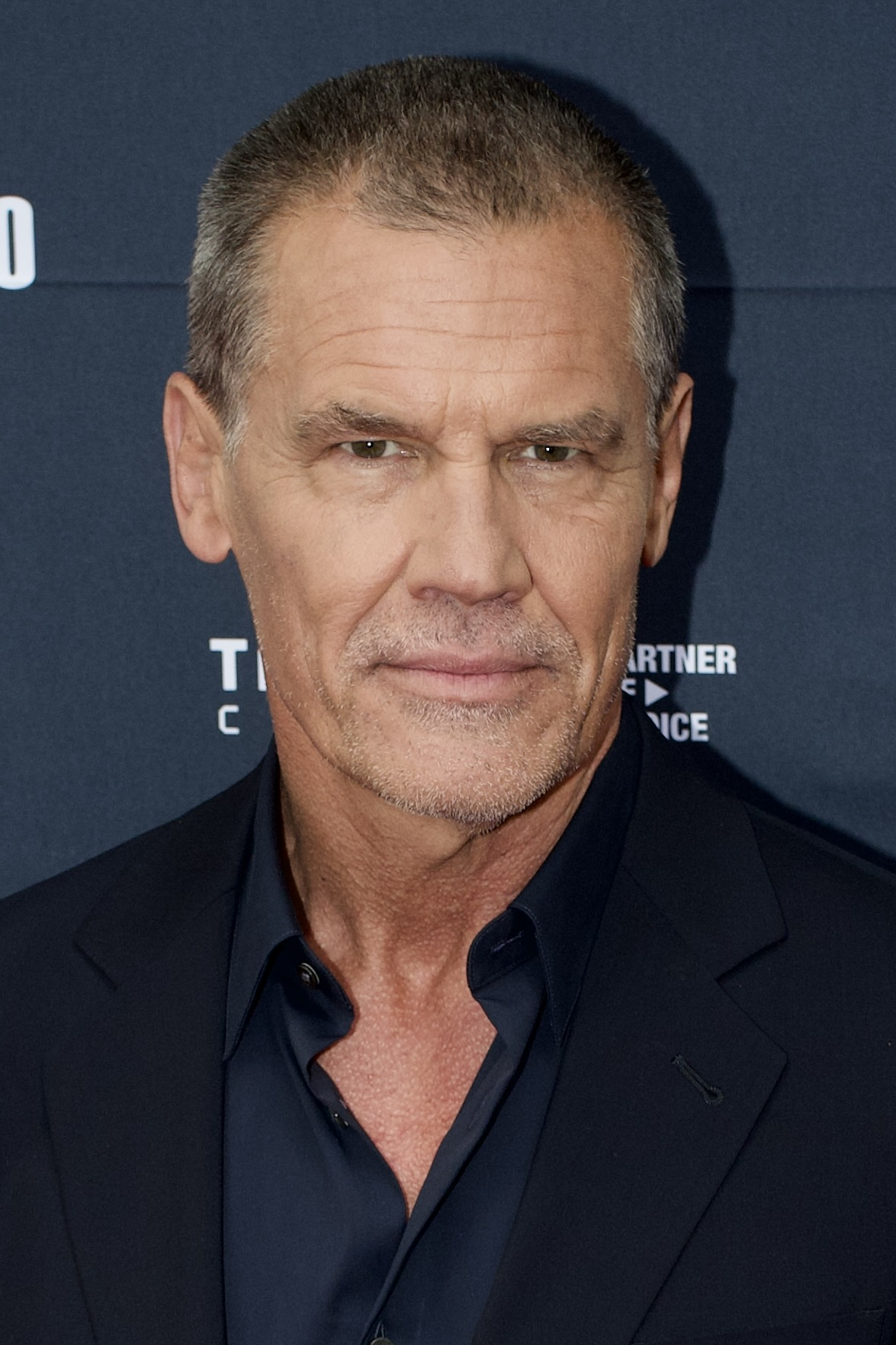
Josh Brolin

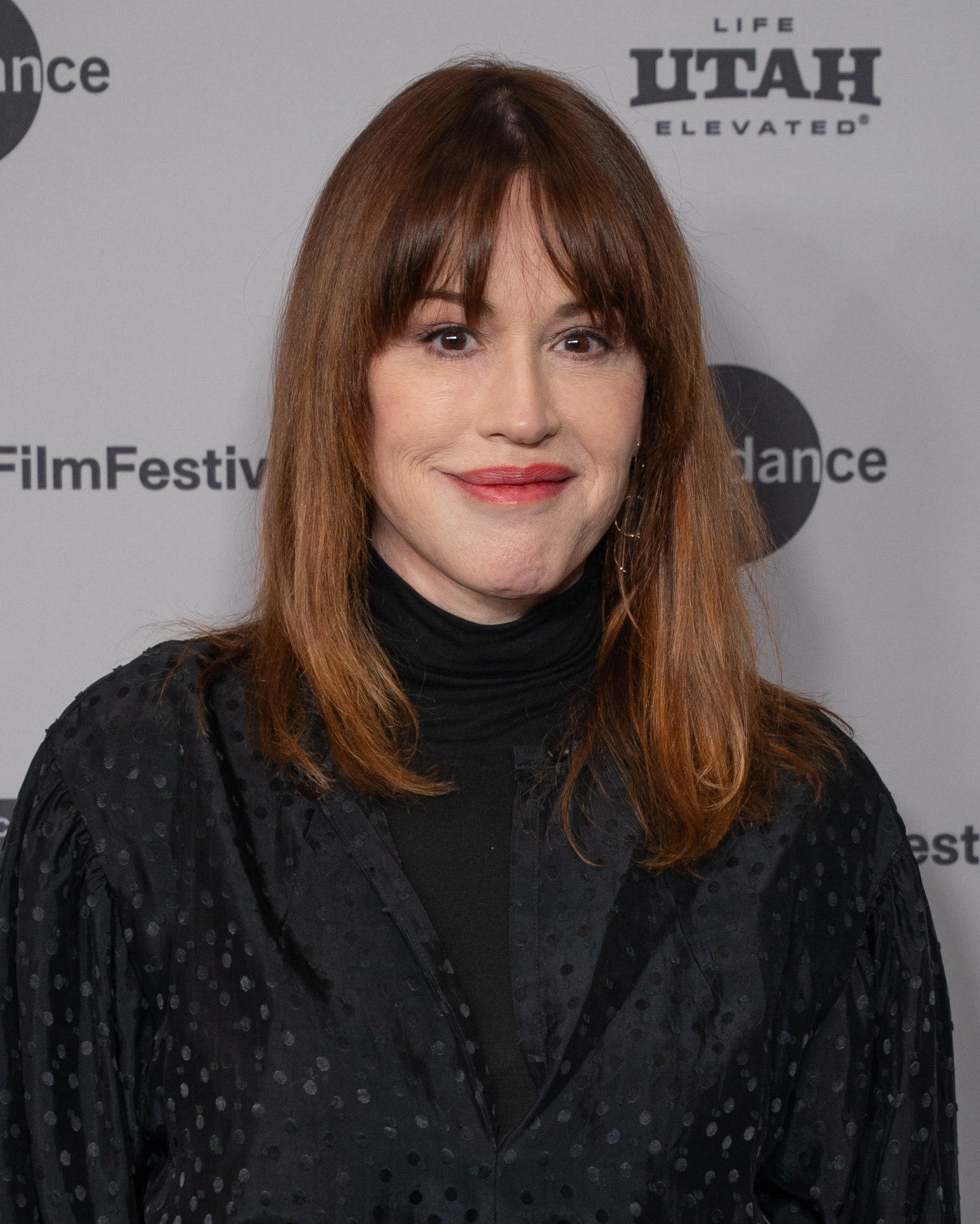
Molly Ringwald

- February 1
  - Lisa Marie Presley, singer/songwriter, daughter of Elvis Presley (d. 2023)
  - Pauly Shore, actor
- February 7 – Sully Erna, singer/songwriter and guitarist
- February 8 – Gary Coleman, actor and comedian (d. 2010)
- February 11 – Mo Willems, writer
- February 12
  - Pauly Shore, comedian, actor, director, and producer
  - Josh Brolin, actor
  - Chynna Phillips, singer/songwriter and actress
- February 13 – Kelly Hu, actress
- February 14 – Phill Lewis, actor
- February 17 – Bryan Cox, football player and coach
- February 18 – Molly Ringwald, actress
- February 19 – Prince Markie Dee, rapper (d. 2021)
- February 20 – Latricia Trammell, basketball coach
- February 22
  - Bradley Nowell, singer/songwriter, guitarist, and producer (d. 1996)
  - Jayson Williams, basketball player and sportscaster§
  - Jeri Ryan, actress
- February 26 – Ed Quinn, actor, model and musician
- February 27 – Mike Sullivan, ice hockey player and coach

=== March ===
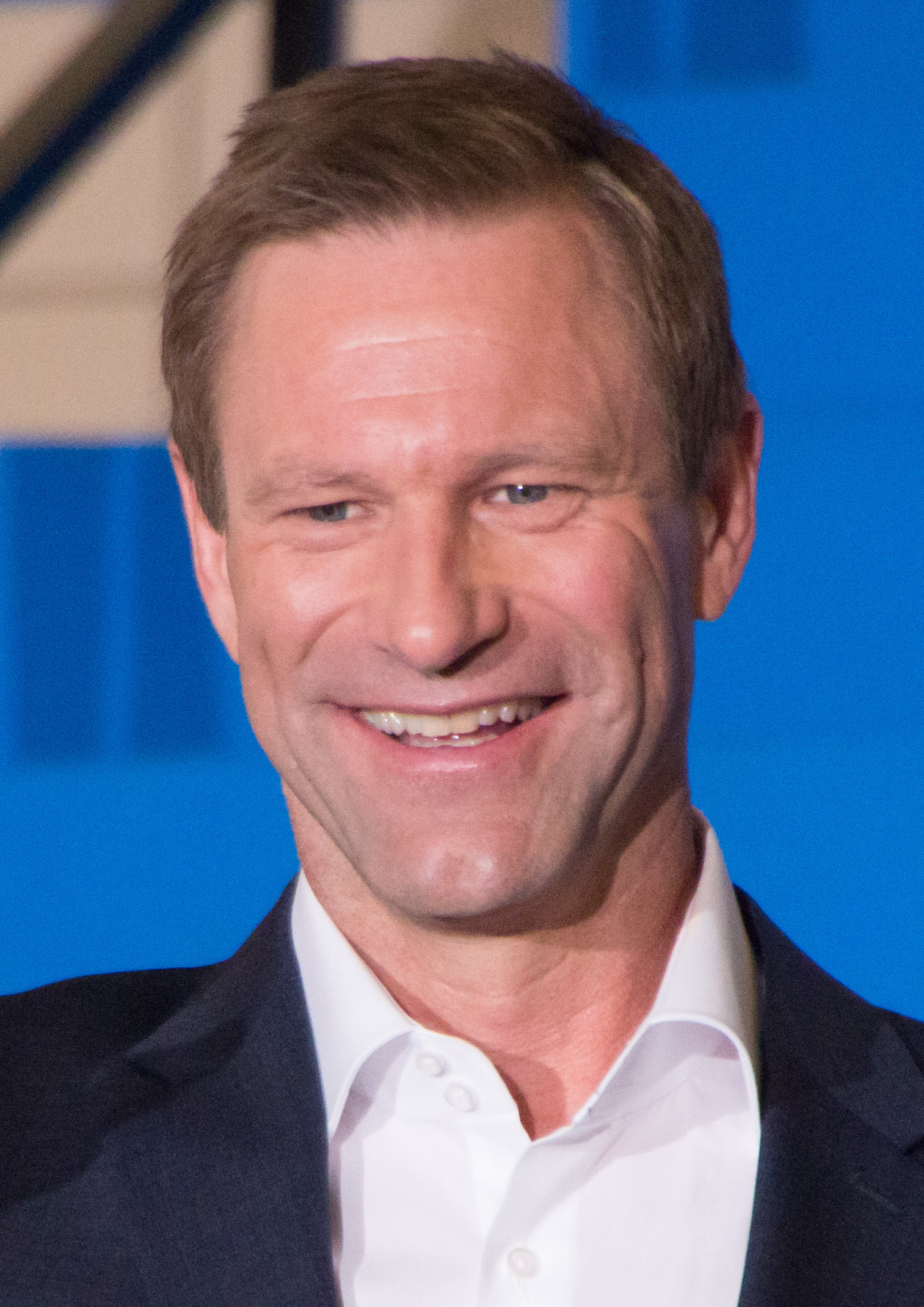
Aaron Eckhart

- March 1 – Tim Steele, racing driver (d. 2024)
- March 3 – Brian Leetch, ice hockey player
- March 4 – James Lankford, politician
- March 6 – Moira Kelly, actress
- March 7 – Jeff Kent, baseball player
- March 11 – Lisa Loeb, singer
- March 12
  - Tammy Duckworth, politician
  - Aaron Eckhart, actor
- March 15
  - Sean Bridgers, actor, screenwriter, and producer
  - Mark McGrath, singer, television host, and frontman for Sugar Ray
- March 20 – Liza Snyder, actress
- March 23 – Mitch Cullin, author
- March 26
  - Kenny Chesney, country music singer
  - James Iha, guitarist and co-founder of The Smashing Pumpkins
- March 28 – Iris Chang, author (d. 2004)

=== April ===
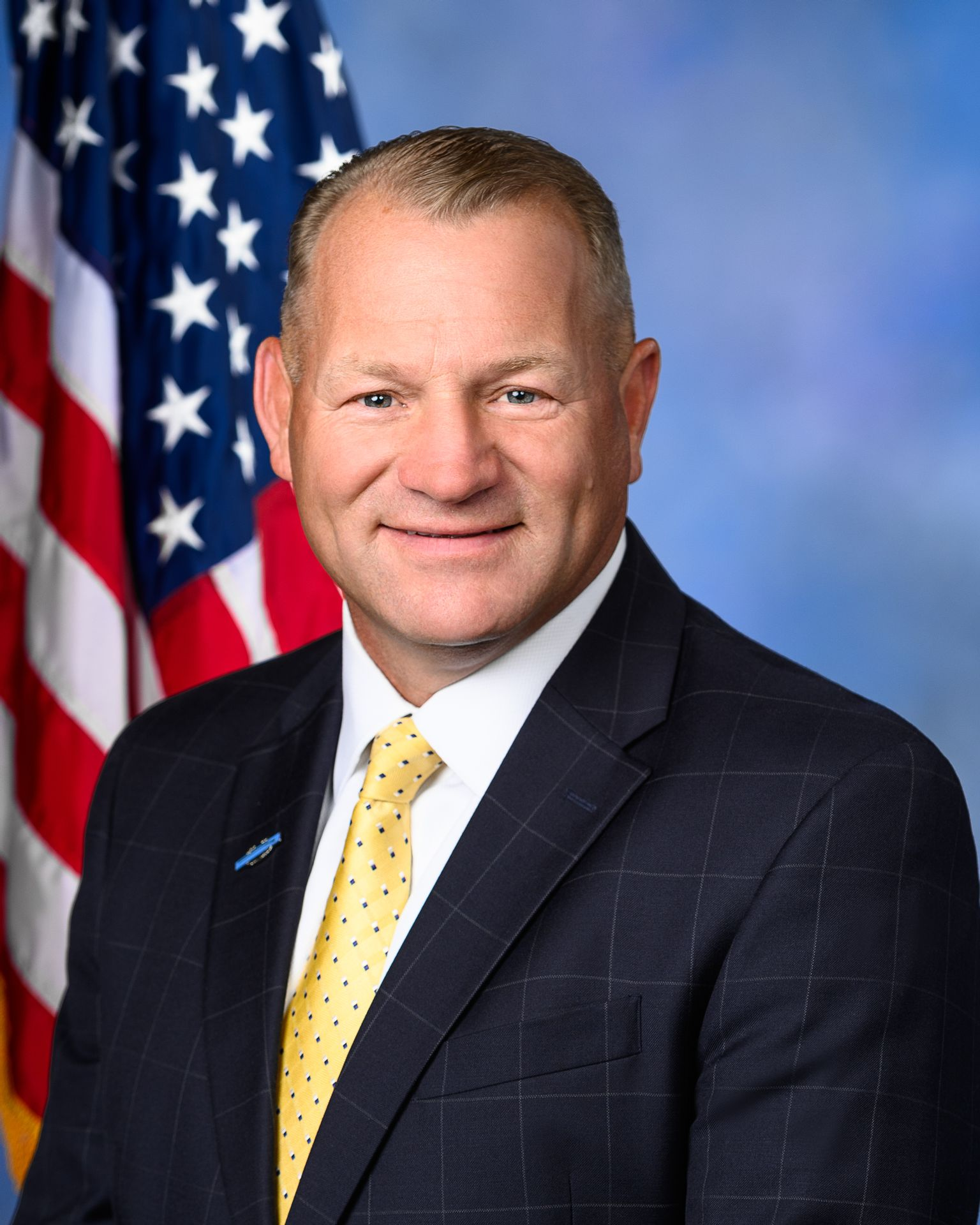
Troy Nehls

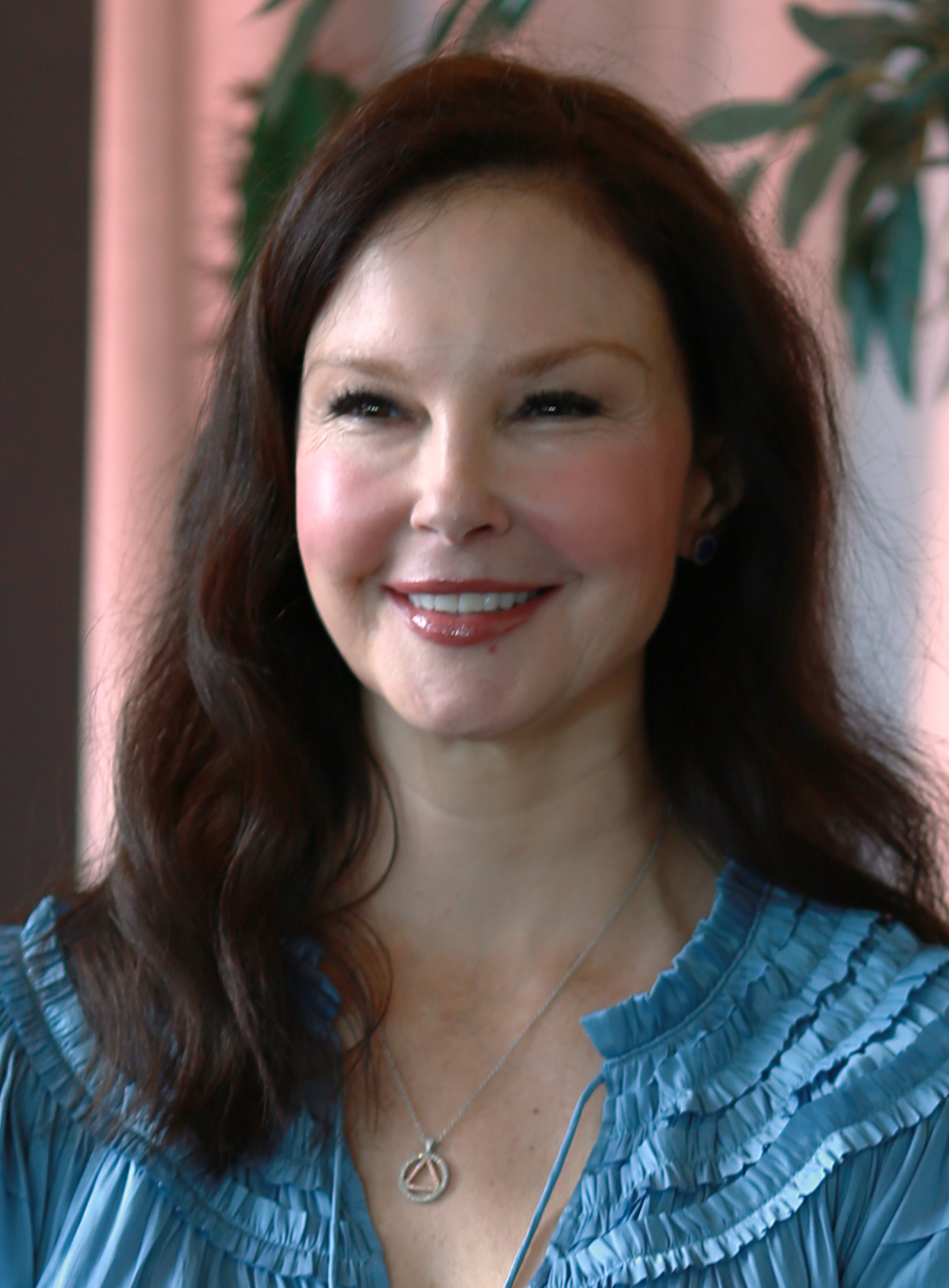
Ashley Judd

- April 5 – Paula Cole, singer
- April 7
  - Lori Chavez-DeRemer, politician, mayor of Happy Valley, Oregon (2011-2019), and Secretary of Labor (2025-present)
  - Troy Nehls, politician and lawman, Sheriff of Fort Bend County, Texas (2013-2021)
- April 8
  - Patricia Arquette, actress
  - Shawn Fonteno, actor and rapper
- April 9
  - Jay Chandrasekhar, actor, comedian, and filmmaker
  - Tom Brands, Olympic wrestler
- April 14 – Anthony Michael Hall, actor
- April 15 – Stacey Williams, model
- April 16
  - Vickie Guerrero, wrestling promoter
  - Greg Baker, actor
- April 17 – Adam McKay, director
- April 19 – Ashley Judd, actress
- April 20 – Ron Carroll, DJ, singer/songwriter, and music producer (d. 2025)
- April 23 – Timothy McVeigh, domestic terrorist who perpetrated the Oklahoma City bombing (d. 2001)
- April 24 – Stacy Haiduk, actress
- April 26 – Angela Santomero, television executive producer
- April 29 – Mark Tucker, football player

=== May ===
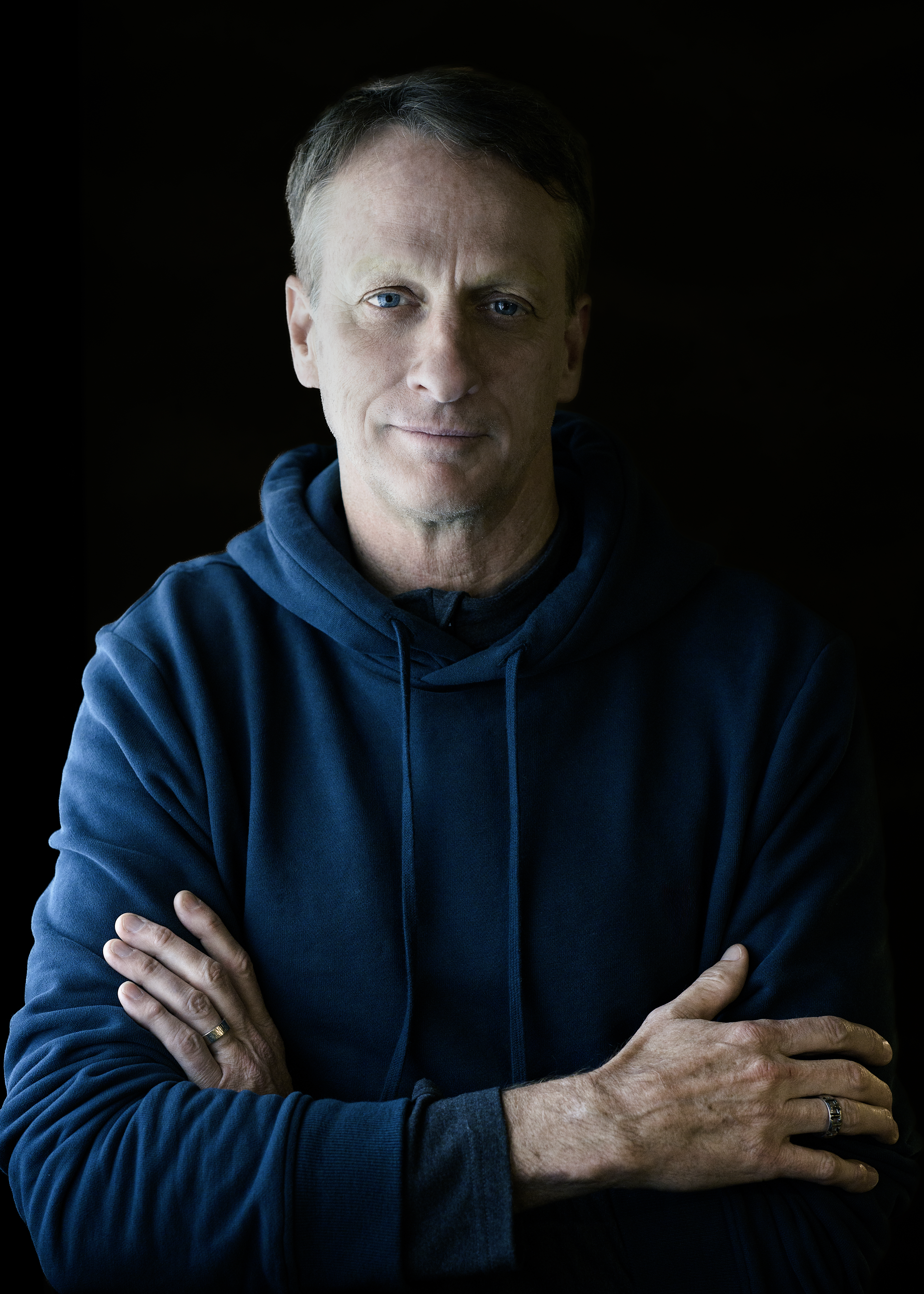
Tony Hawk

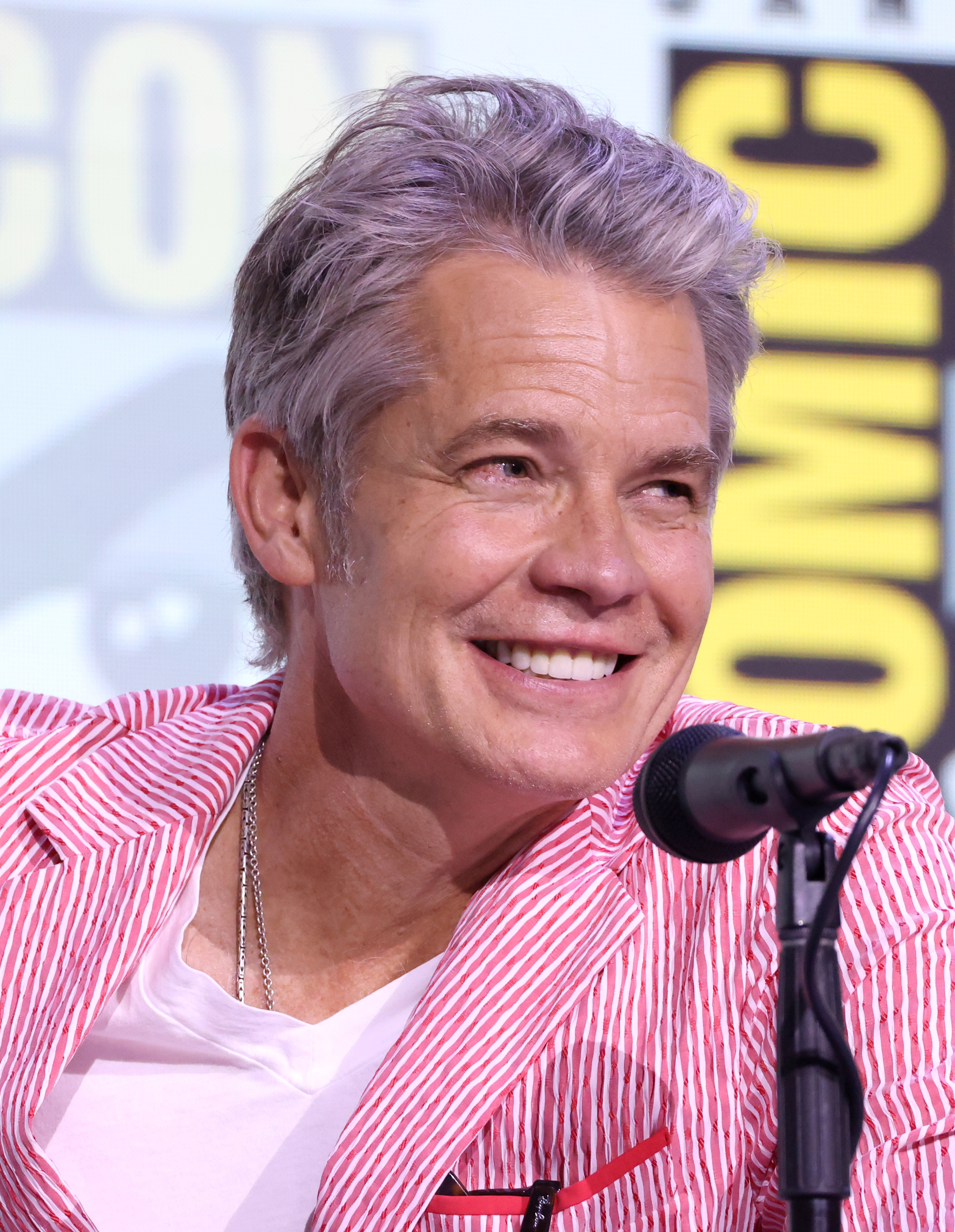
Timothy Olyphant

- May 1
  - Johnny Colt, bass player
  - D'arcy Wretzky, bass player and singer, frontman for Smashing Pumpkins
- May 2
  - Eric Holcomb, politician, 51st Governor of Indiana (2017-2025)
  - Sean Taylor, writer
  - Jeff Agoos, soccer player
- May 3
  - Traci Lords, actress
  - Nina Paley, cartoonist
  - Amy Ryan, actress
- May 4 – Becca Balint, politician
- May 5 – Brian Van Flandern, mixologist and author
- May 9 – David Benoit, basketball player
- May 10 – Phil Weiser, politician
- May 11 – David Young, politician
- May 12
  - Mark Clark, baseball player and coach
  - Scott Schwartz, child actor
  - Tony Hawk, skateboarder
- May 14 – John Besh, chef, television personality, philanthropist, restaurateur, and author
- May 19
  - Kyle Eastwood, jazz bass musician
  - Jesse Peretz, director and producer
- May 20 – Timothy Olyphant, actor
- May 25 – Kevin Heffernan, actor and filmmaker
- May 27
  - Jeff Bagwell, baseball player
  - Frank Thomas, baseball player
  - Jennifer Wexton, politician

=== June ===
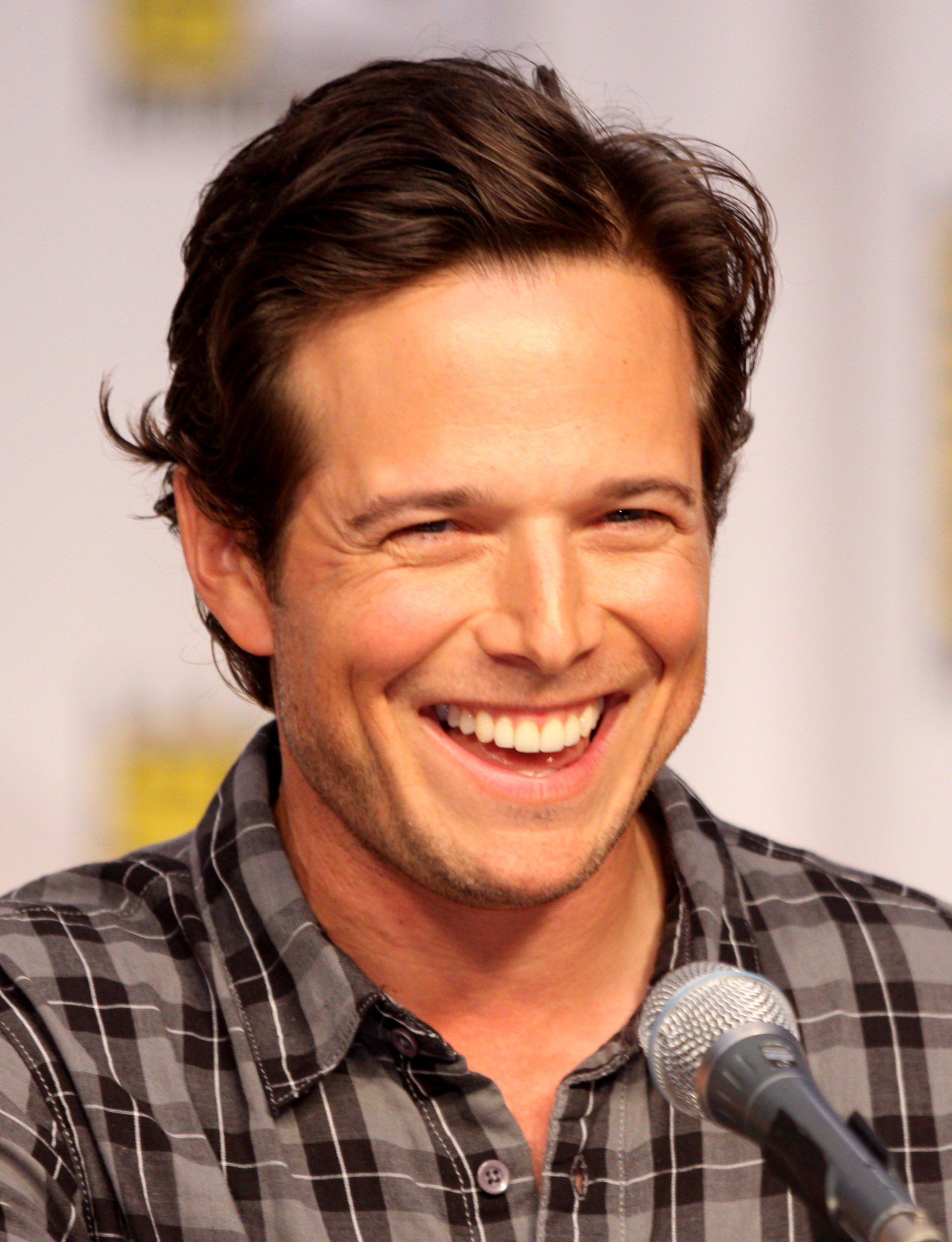
Scott Wolf

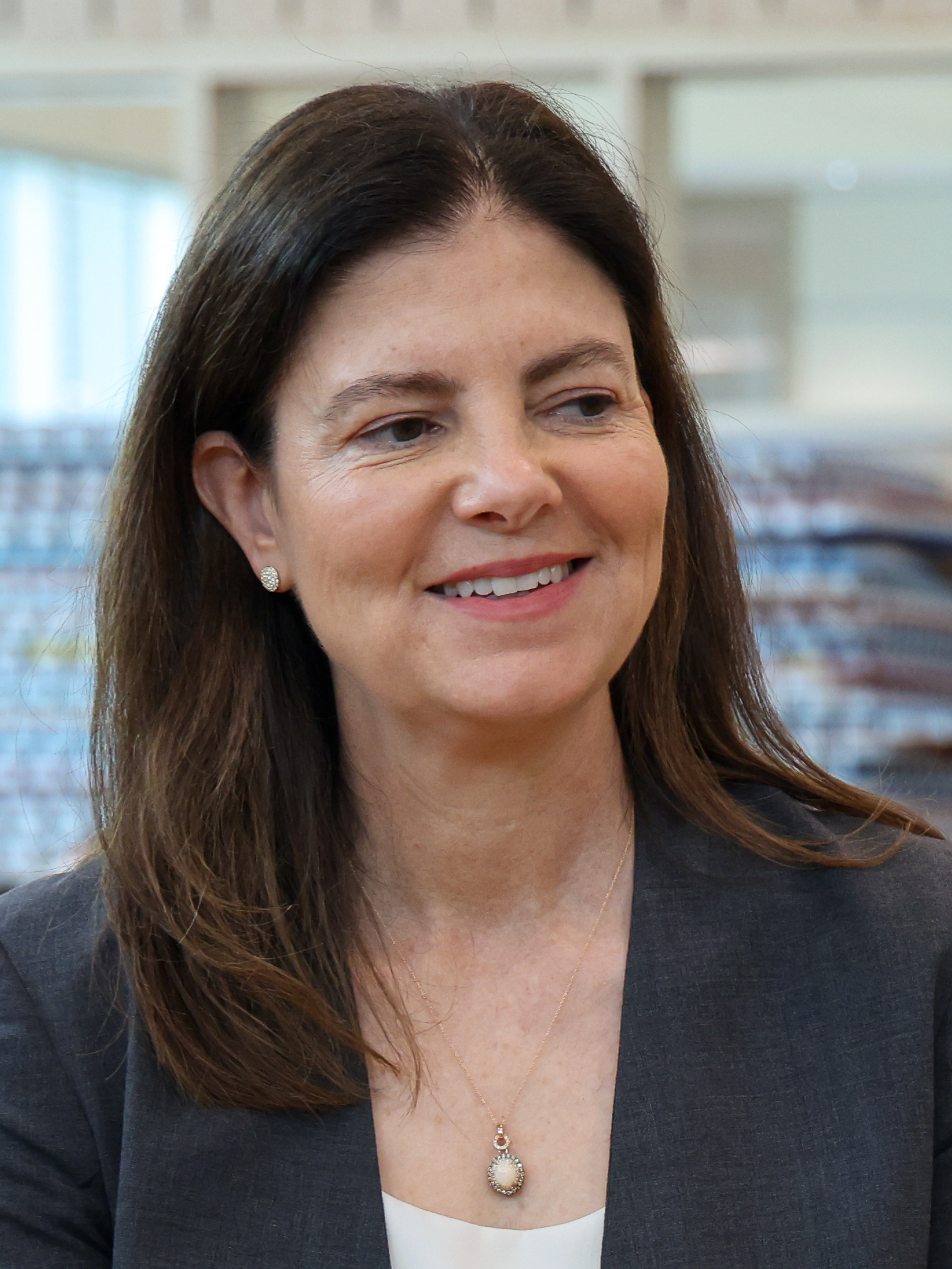
Kelly Ayotte

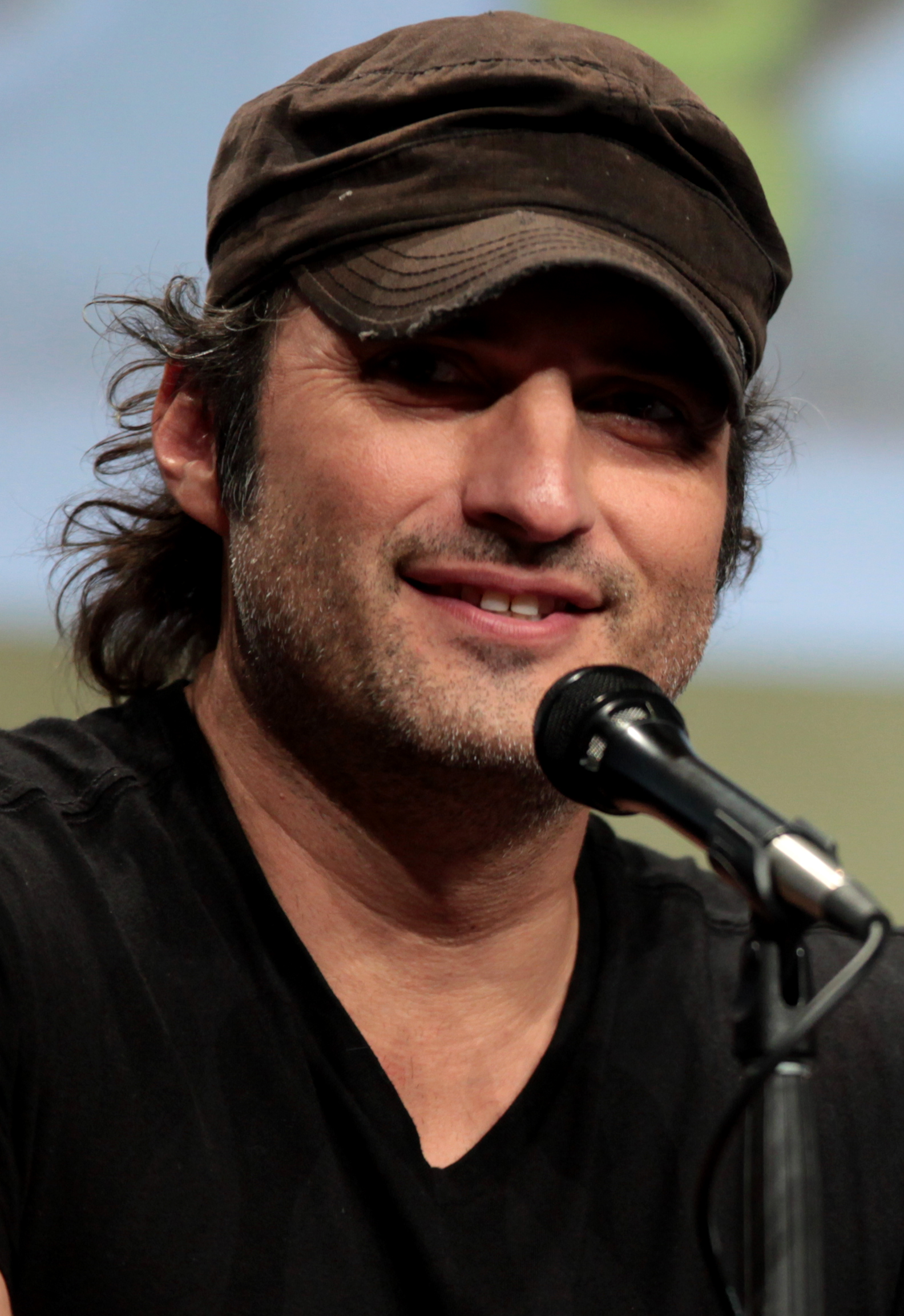
Robert Rodriguez

- June 1 – Brian Doherty, journalist (d. 2026)
- June 2
  - Jason Falkner, singer/songwriter, guitarist and producer (Jellyfish, The Grays, and The Three O'Clock)
  - Andy Cohen, radio and television talk show host
  - Beetlejuice, actor
- June 4
  - Joey Mazzarino, actor, puppeteer, writer, and director
  - Scott Wolf, actor
- June 5 – Brett James, country singer/songwriter (d. 2025)
- June 8 – Black Rob, rapper (d. 2021)
- June 10 – Bill Burr, comedian
- June 14
  - Yasmine Bleeth, actress
  - Campbell Brown, journalist
  - Faizon Love, actor and comedian
  - Taylor Wily, actor (d. 2024)
- June 20 – Robert Rodriguez, actor and filmmaker
- June 26 – Troy Jackson, politician
- June 27 – Kelly Ayotte, politician, 83rd Governor of New Hampshire (2025-present)
- June 30 – Phil Anselmo, heavy metal vocalist

=== July ===
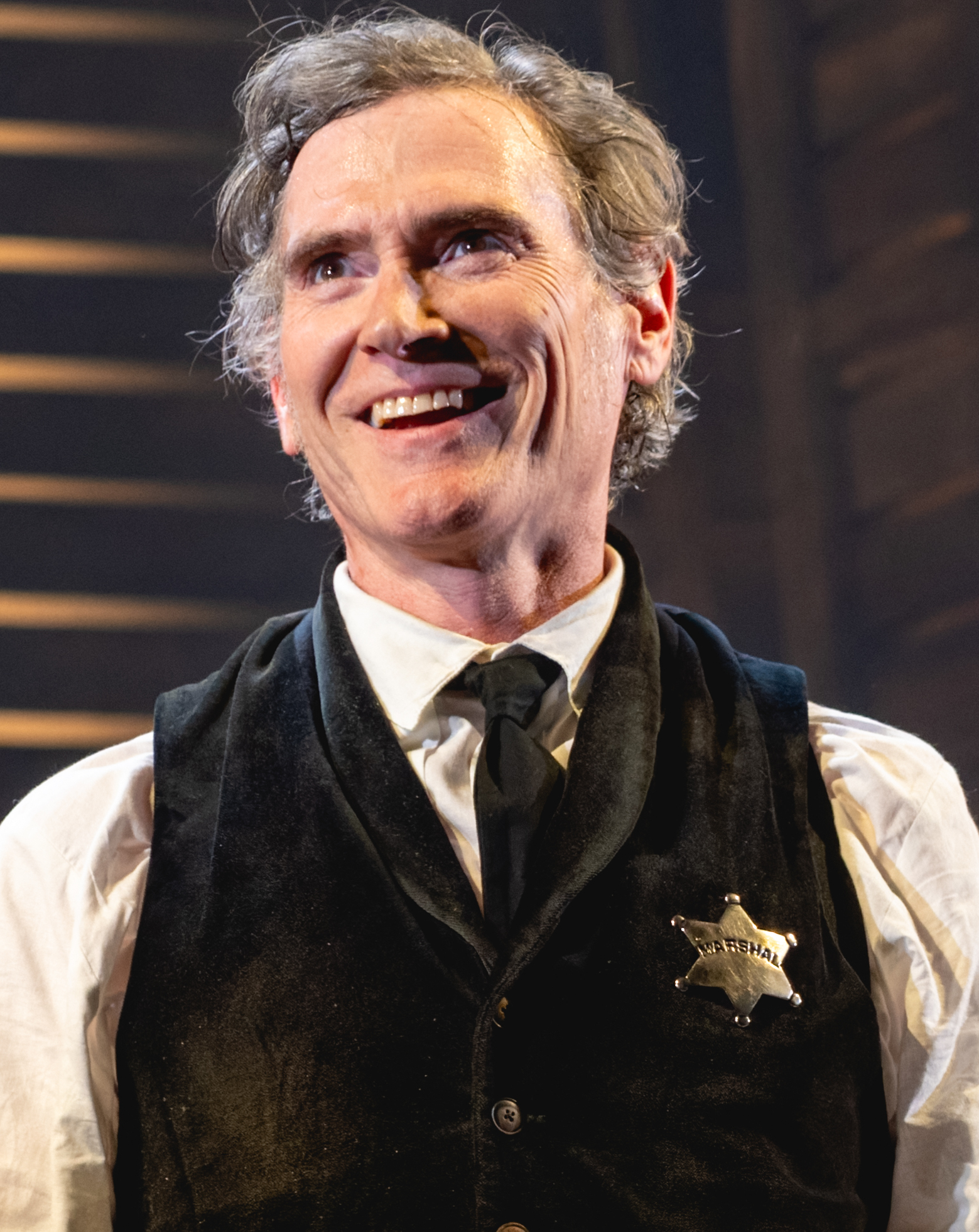
Billy Crudup

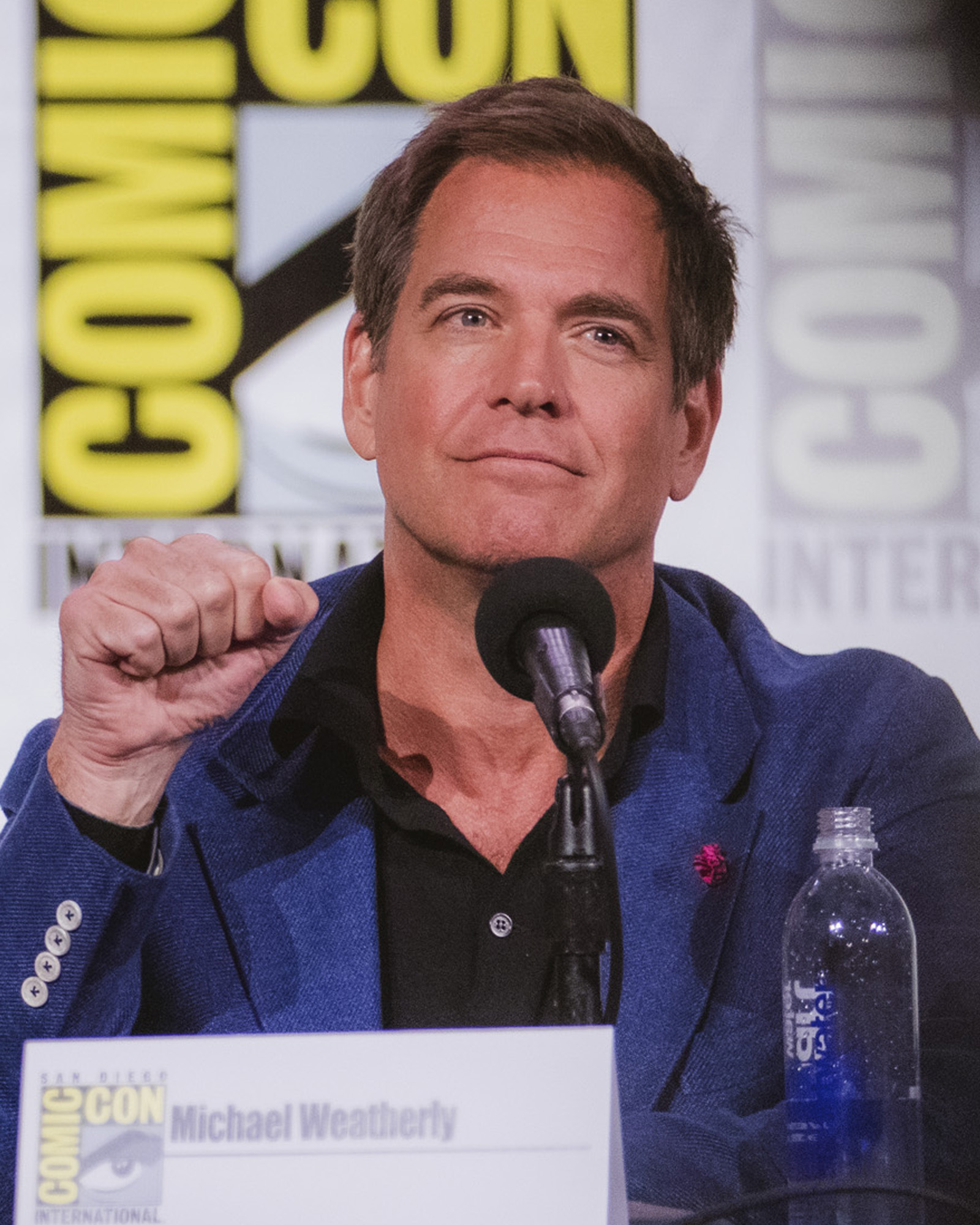
Michael Weatherly

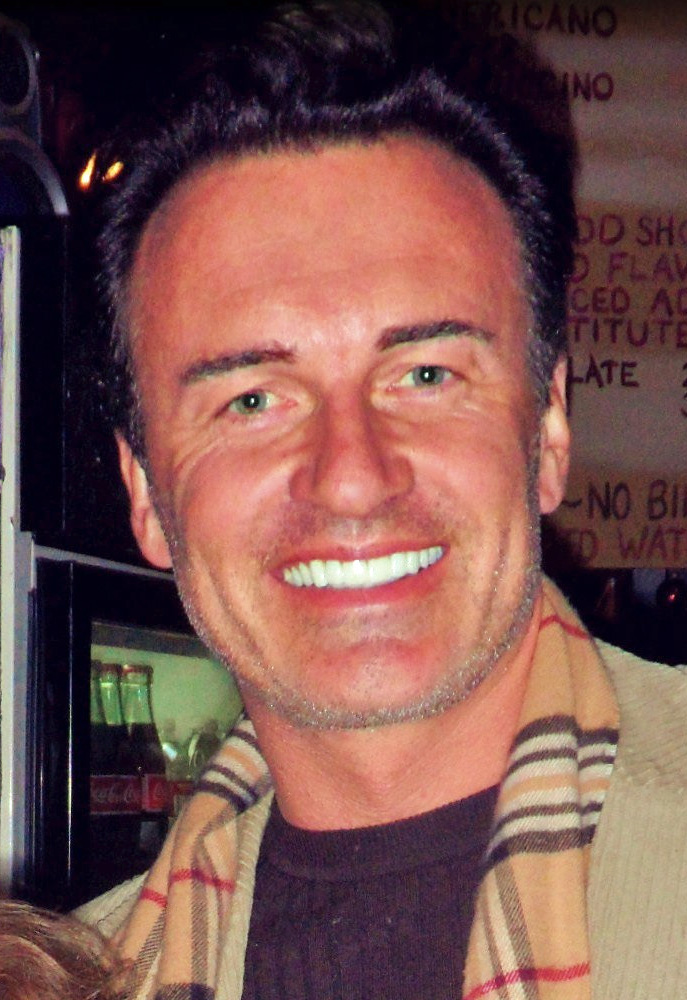
Julian McMahon

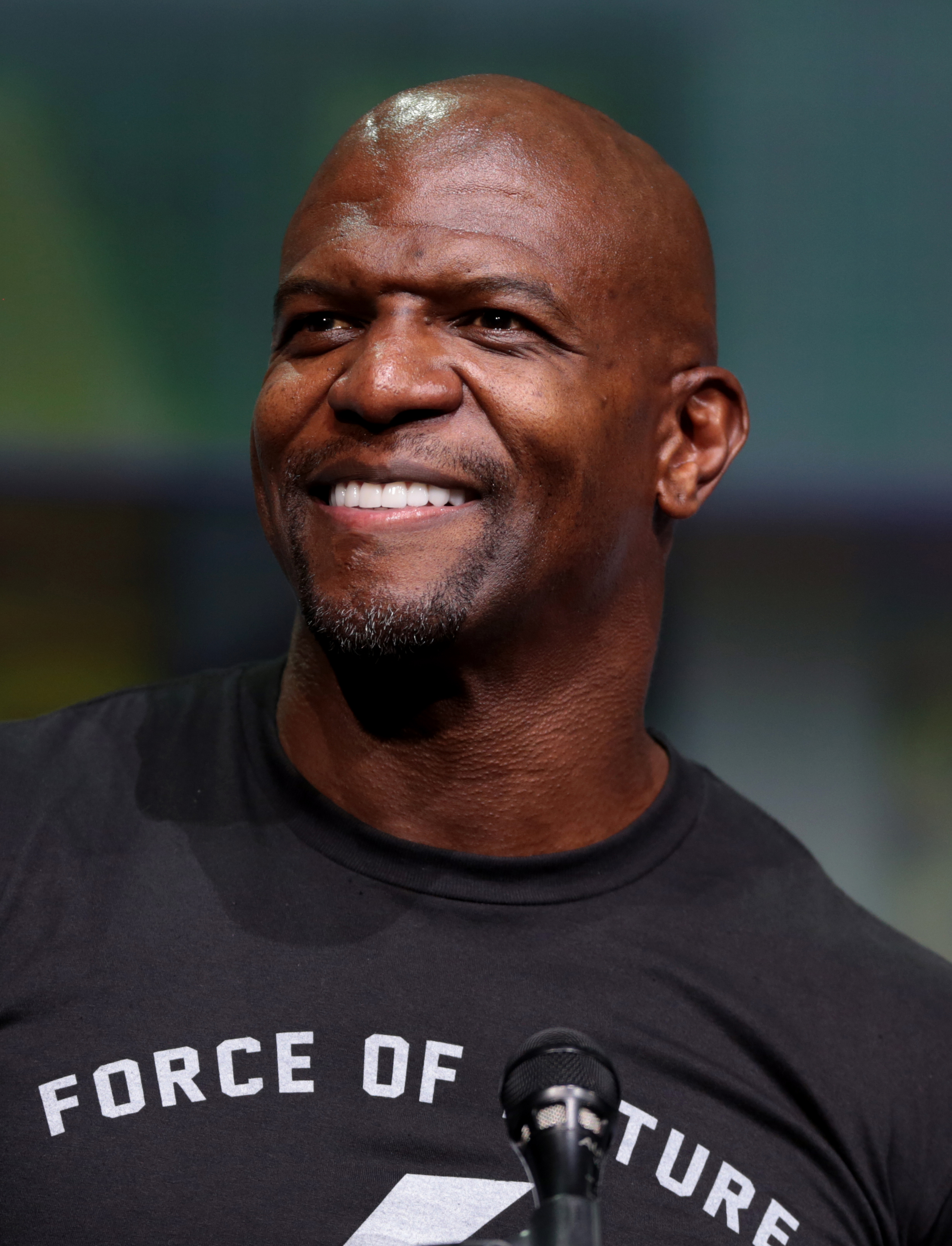
Terry Crews

- July 2 – Ron Goldman, murder victim (d. 1994)
- July 4 – Dan Maffei, politician
- July 5
  - Darin LaHood, politician
  - Michael Stuhlbarg, actor
  - Susan Wojcicki, CEO of YouTube (d. 2024)
- July 7
  - Allen Payne, actor
  - Jeff VanderMeer, writer
- July 8
  - Billy Crudup, actor
  - John Mannion, politician
  - Michael Weatherly, actor
- July 11 – Conrad Vernon, voice actor and director
- July 13 – Robert Gant, actor
- July 16
  - Larry Sanger, co-founder of Wikipedia
  - Lynn Turner, poisoner convicted of double homicide (d. 2010)
  - Barry Sanders, football player
- July 17 – Beth Littleford, actress and comedian
- July 23
  - Elden Campbell, basketball player (d. 2025)
  - Gary Payton, basketball player
  - Stephanie Seymour, model and actress
- July 24
  - Kristin Chenoweth, actress, singer, and author
  - Laura Leighton, actress
  - Troy Kotsur, actor
- July 25 – John Grant, singer/songwriter
- July 27 – Julian McMahon, Australian-born actor (d. 2025)
- July 29 – Kristen Babb-Sprague, synchronized swimmer
- July 30 – Terry Crews, actor

=== August ===
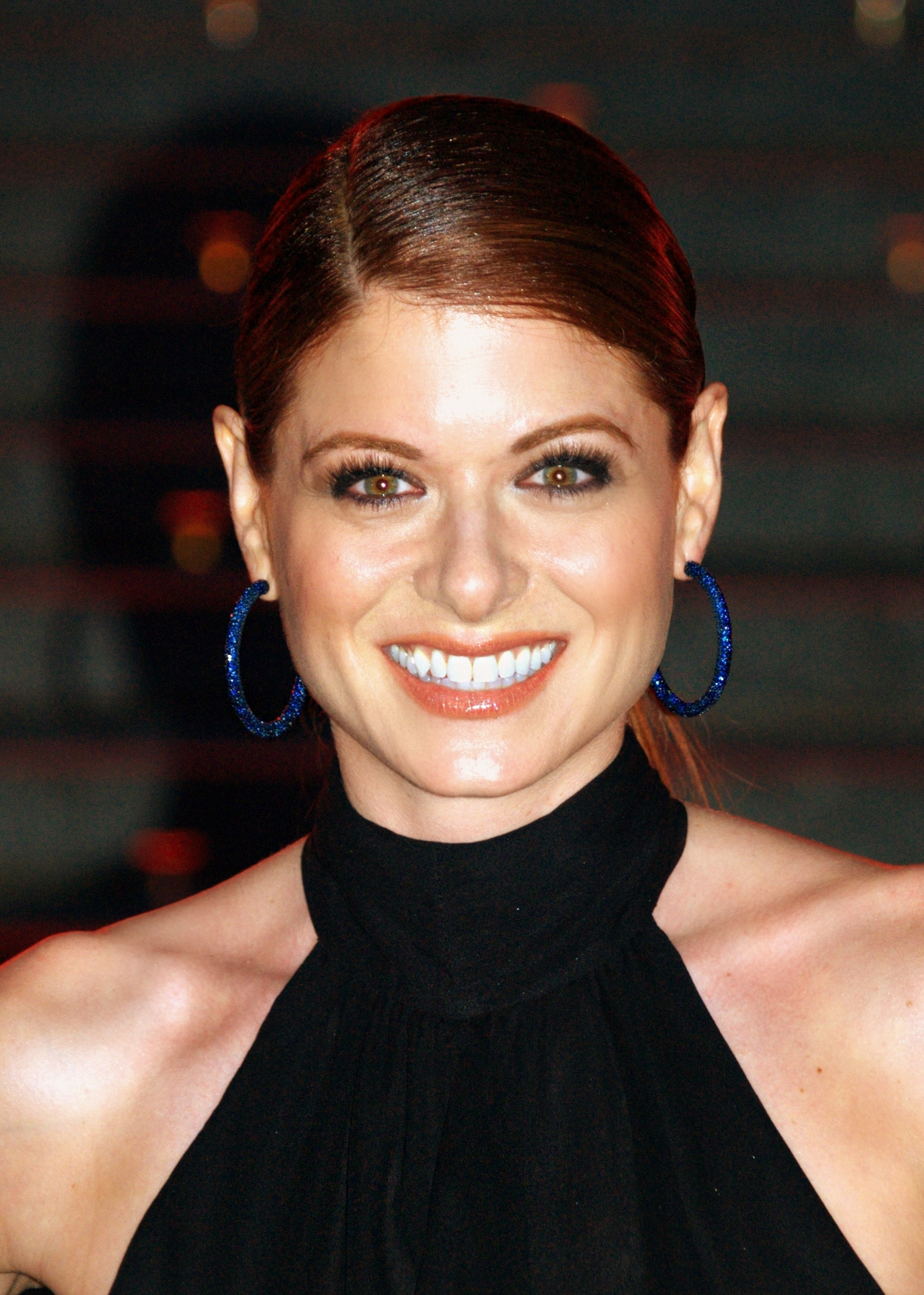
Debra Messing

- August 1 – Kenneth Bae, South Korean-born missionary
- August 3 – Rod Beck, baseball player (d. 2007)
- August 7 – Lynn Strait, musician (d. 1998)
- August 9 – Gillian Anderson, actress
- August 14 – Jennifer Flavin, businesswoman
- August 15 – Debra Messing, actress
- August 17 – Ed McCaffrey, football player
- August 18 – Mark Robinson, politician, 35th Lieutenant Governor of North Carolina (2021-2025)
- August 21
  - Tim Griffin, politician, 20th Lieutenant Governor of Arkansas (2015-2023)
  - Stretch, rapper and record producer (d. 1995)
- August 22 – Rich Lowry, writer and magazine editor (National Review)
- August 23 – Kim Schrier, politician
- August 24
  - John McGuire, politician
  - Tim Salmon, baseball player
- August 25 – Rachael Ray, TV host

=== September ===
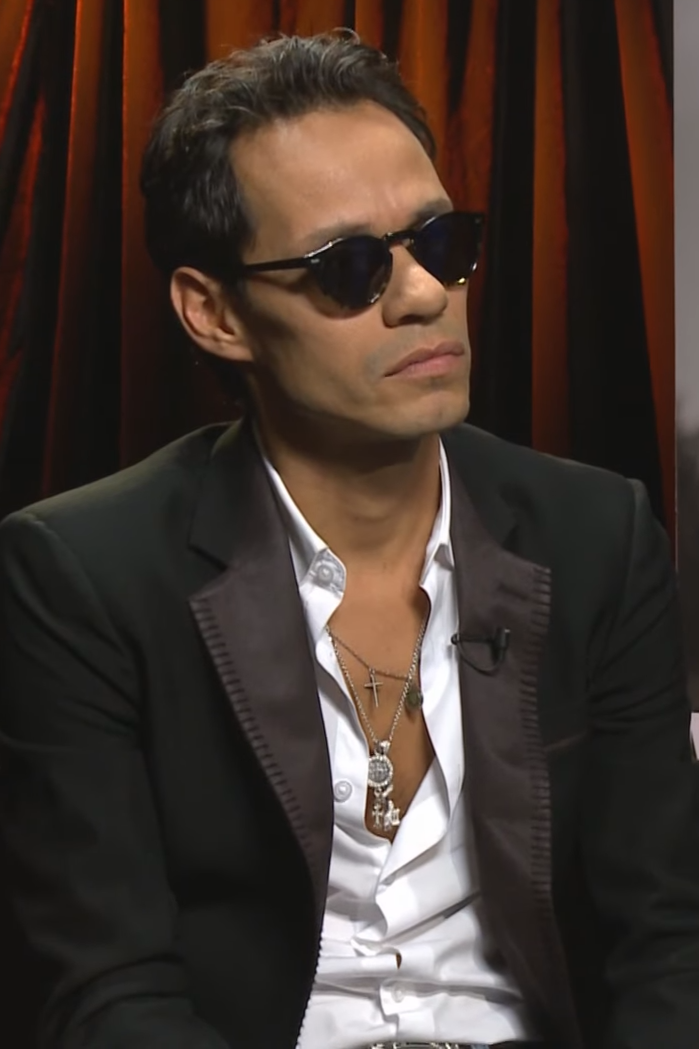
Marc Anthony

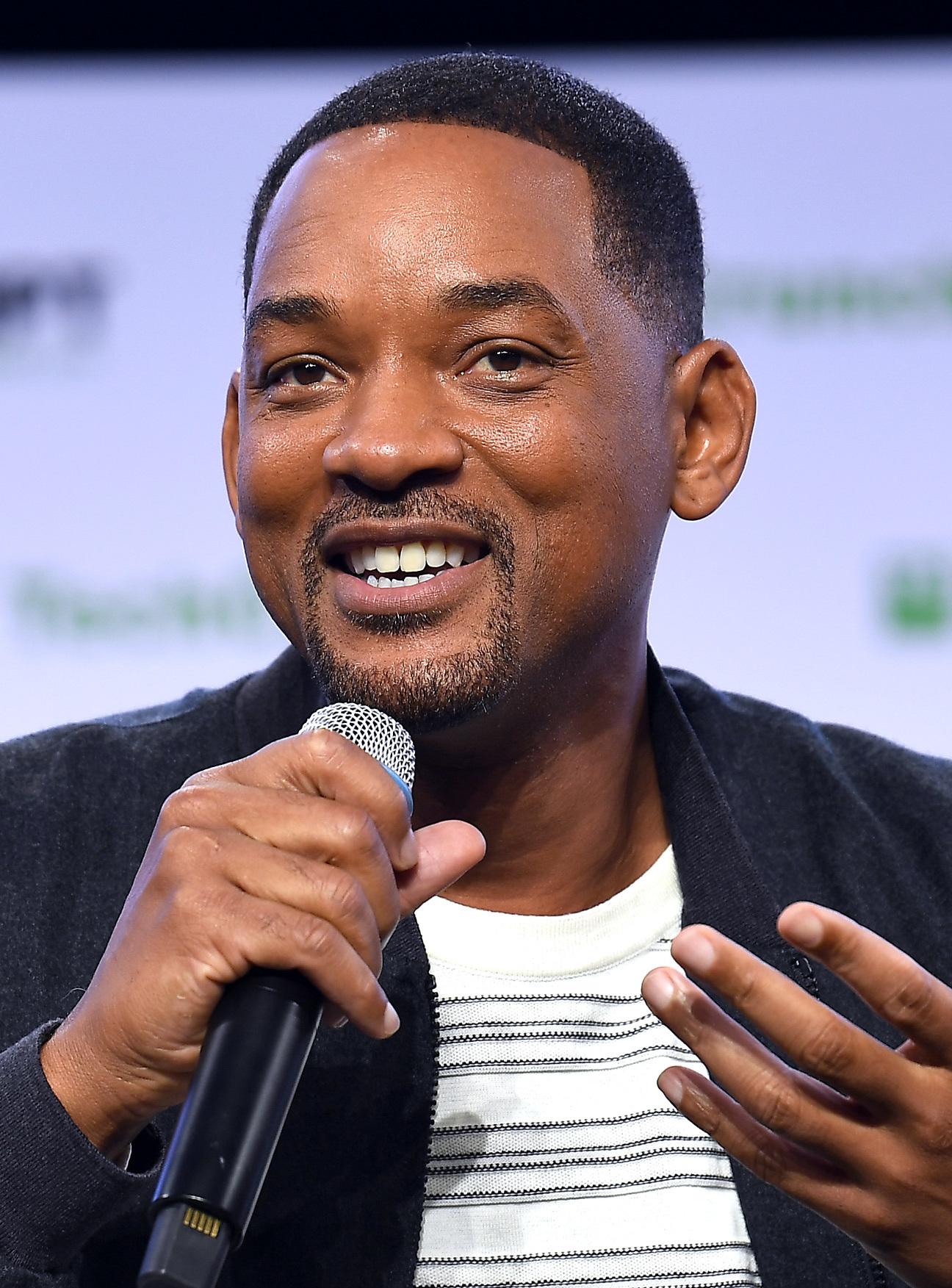
Will Smith

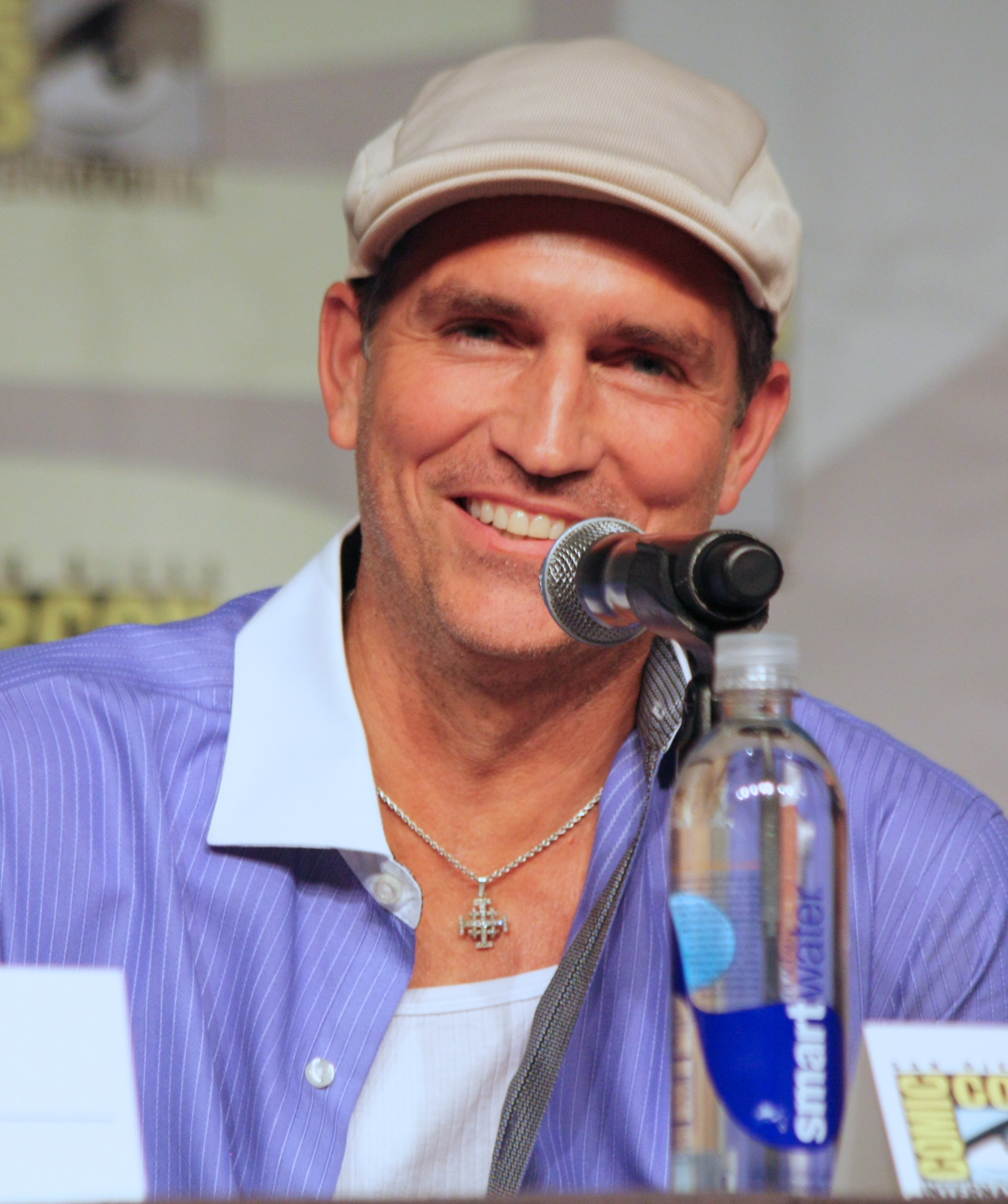
Jim Caviezel

- September 4
  - John DiMaggio, voice actor
  - Mike Piazza, baseball player
- September 5 – Thomas Kean Jr., politician
- September 8 – Brian Huskey, actor, comedian, and writer
- September 10 – Big Daddy Kane, hip-hop artist
- September 11
  - Kay Hanley, singer
  - Litefoot, actor
- September 15
  - Susan Dalian, actress
  - Danny Nucci, actor
- September 16 – Marc Anthony, actor and singer
- September 17
  - Anastacia, singer/songwriter
  - Joe Bastianich, restaurateur, author, and television personality
- September 20
  - Van Jones, political commentator
  - Chad Stahelski, stuntman and filmmaker
  - Michelle Visage, singer and radio DJ
  - Norah Vincent, journalist (d. 2022)
- September 21
  - Ricki Lake, television host and actress
  - Trugoy the Dove, rapper and record producer for De La Soul (d. 2023)
- September 23 – Michelle Thomas, actress (d. 1998)
- September 25
  - Will Smith, actor, producer and rapper
  - John A. List, economist
- September 26
  - James Caviezel, actor
  - Ben Shenkman, television, film and stage actor
- September 28 – Julie Fedorchak, politician
- September 29 – Alex Skolnick, jazz/heavy metal guitarist

=== October ===
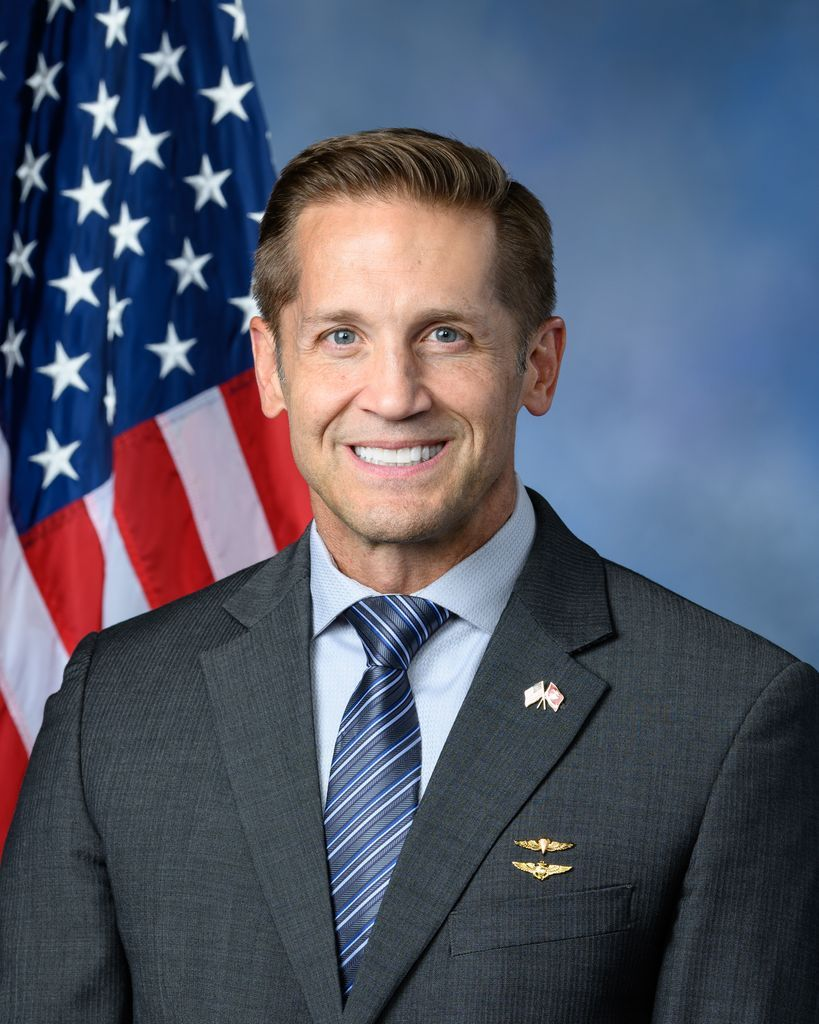
Rich McCormick

- October 1 – Michael Whatley, politician and RNC Chairperson (2024-2025)
- October 3 – Craig Goldman, politician
- October 7 – Rich McCormick, politician
- October 8 – Emily Procter, actress
- October 9
  - Troy Davis, high-profile death row inmate and human rights activist (d. 2011)
  - Pete Docter, animator, film director, screenwriter, producer, voice actor and chief creative officer of Pixar
- October 11 – Jane Krakowski, actress
- October 12 – Adam Rich, actor
- October 13
  - Preet Bharara, Indian-born politician
  - Tisha Campbell-Martin, actress and singer
- October 20 – Sunny Hostin, lawyer and television host

=== November ===
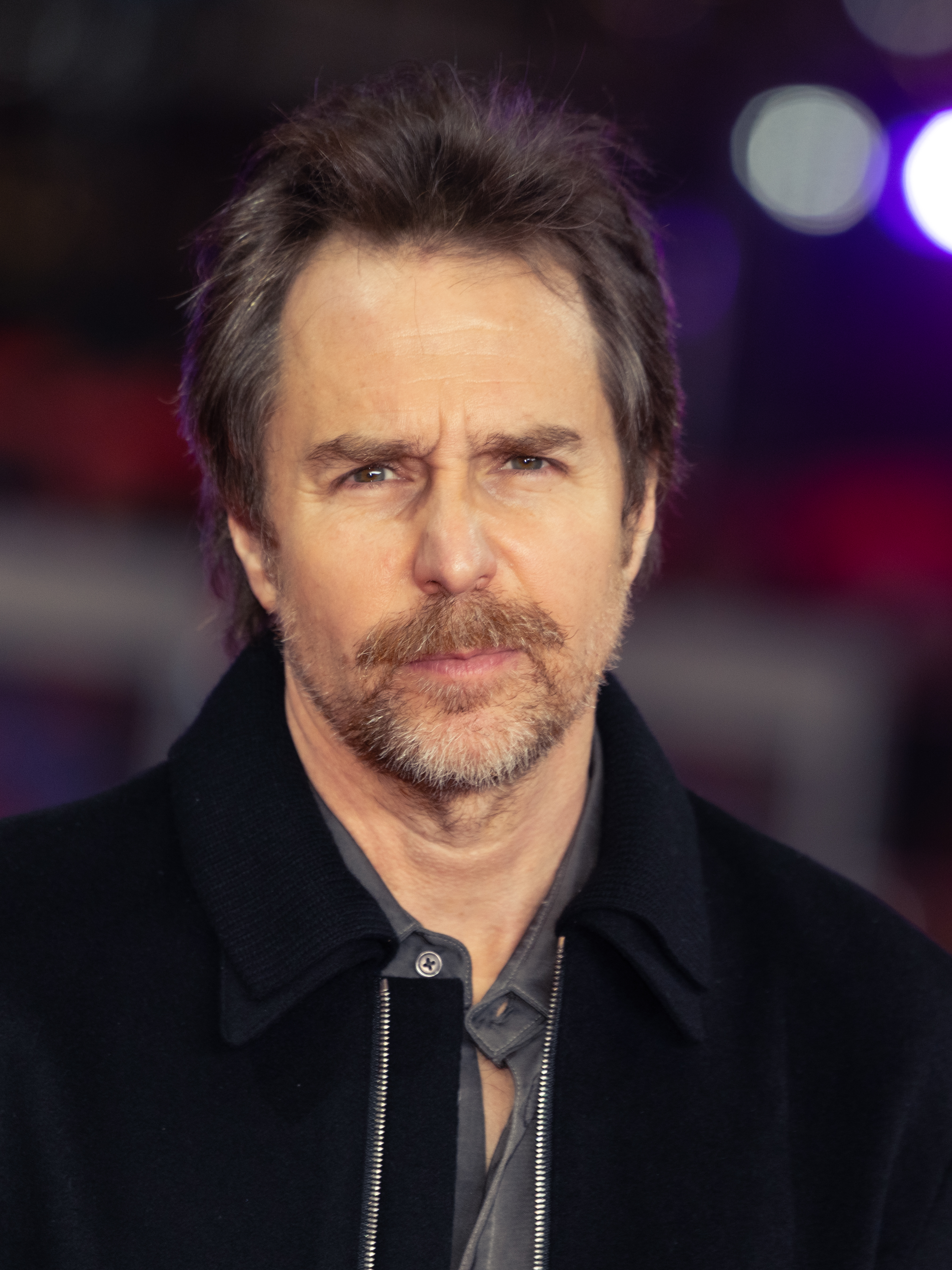
Sam Rockwell

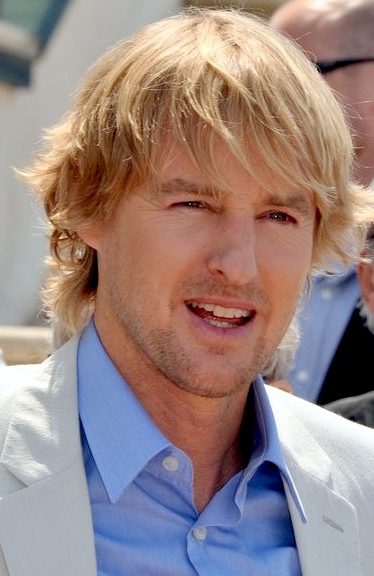
Owen Wilson

- November 4 – Miles Long, pornographic actor and director
- November 5
  - Sam Rockwell, actor
  - Seth Gilliam, actor
- November 6 – Kelly Rutherford, actress
- November 8 – Parker Posey, actress
- November 10
  - Chris Cagle, country singer
  - Tracy Morgan, actor and comedian
- November 11 – Tim Huelskamp, politician
- November 12
  - Kathleen Hanna, musician and activist
  - Joe Levins, alpine skier
  - Sammy Sosa, Dominican-born baseball player
- November 13
  - Pat Hentgen, baseball player and coach
  - Steve Lemme, actor, writer, and producer
- November 14 – Roland Martin, political commentator
- November 15 – Ol' Dirty Bastard, rapper (d. 2004)
- November 18
  - Nicholas Scutari, politician
  - Gary Sheffield, baseball player
  - Owen Wilson, actor and comedian
- November 24
  - Todd Beamer, passenger on board United Airlines Flight 93 (d. 2001)
  - Ken Bevel, actor and pastor
- November 29 – Jonathan Knight, singer
- November 30 – DuShon Monique Brown, actress (d. 2018)

=== December ===
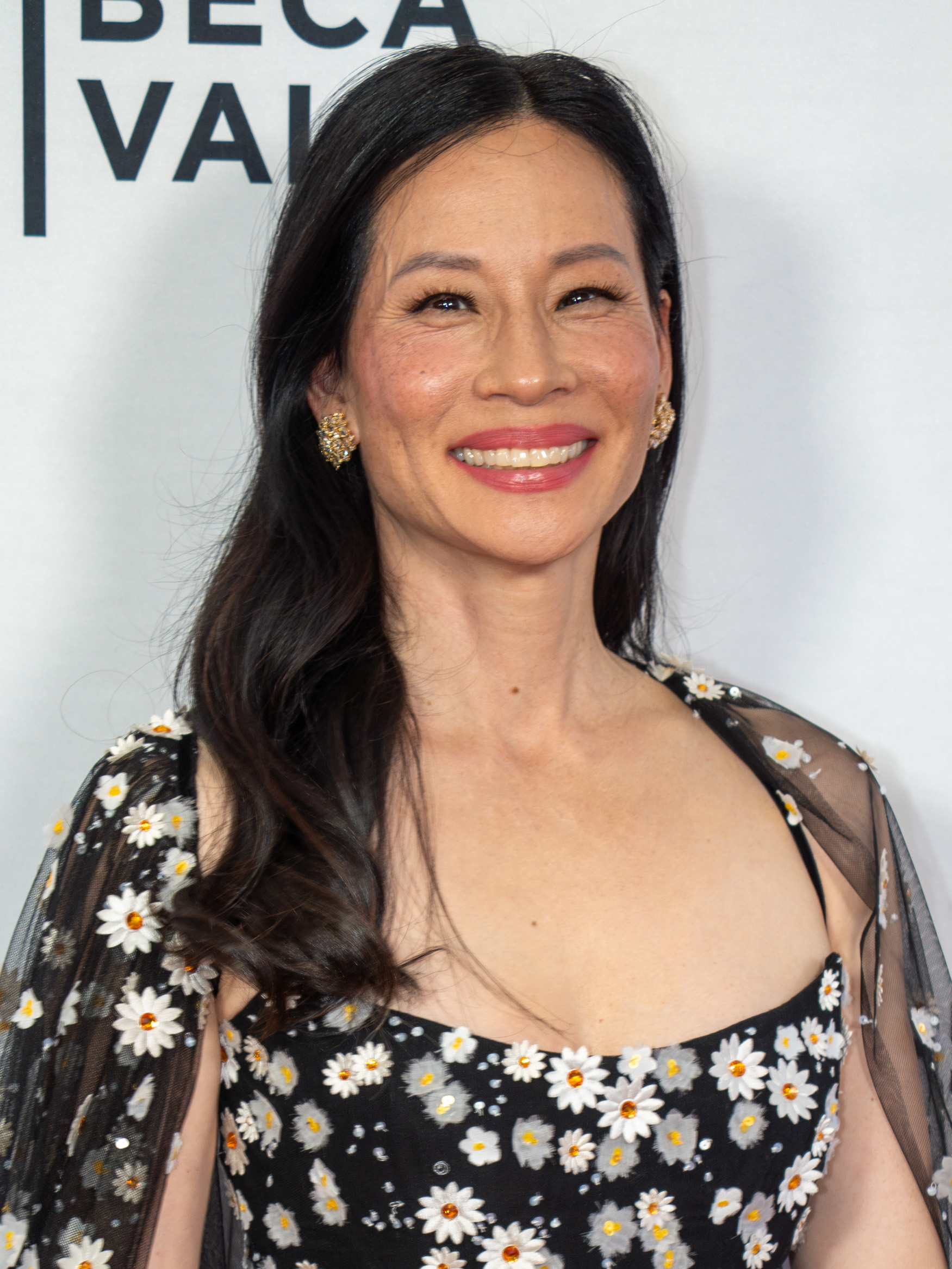
Lucy Liu

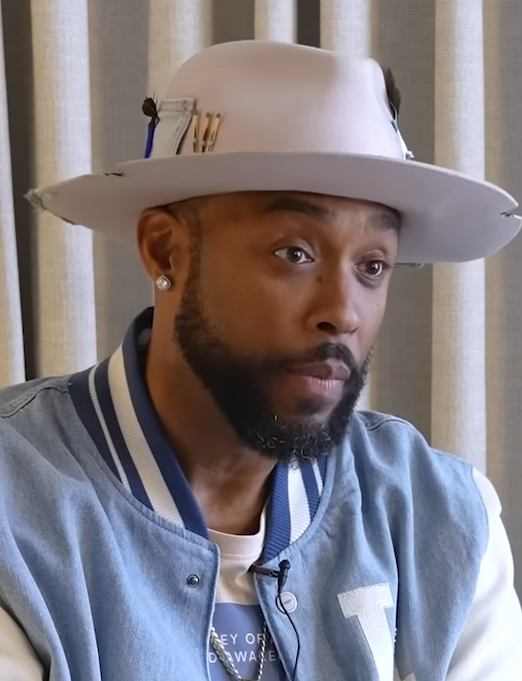
Montell Jordan

- December 2
  - Lucy Liu, actress, voice actress, director, singer, dancer, model, and artist
  - Nate Mendel, bassist for Foo Fighters
  - Joshua Seth, voice actor and hypnotist
  - Rena Sofer, actress
- December 3
  - Brendan Fraser, actor
  - Montell Jordan, singer
- December 5 – Margaret Cho, actress and comedian
- December 7 – Greg Ayres, voice actor
- December 8
  - Michael Cole, wrestling commentator
  - Mike Mussina, baseball player
- December 9 – Kurt Angle, wrestler
- December 16
  - Peter Dante, actor and comedian
  - Tom Spurgeon, journalist, comics critic and editor (d. 2019)
- December 19 – Ken Marino, actor and comedian
- December 21 – Mark Kerr, wrestler and mixed martial artist
- December 22 – Dina Meyer, actress
- December 23 – Manuel Rivera-Ortiz, photographer
- December 26
  - Dennis Knight, wrestler
  - Malcolm L. McCallum, herpetologist, conservation biologist, and environmental scientist
- December 28 – Deanna Favre, activist and wife of Brett Favre
- December 29 – Tricia Leigh Fisher, actress and singer

== Deaths ==
- January 16 – Bob Jones Sr., evangelist, religious broadcaster and founder of Bob Jones University (born 1883)
- January 18
  - John Ridgely, actor (born 1909)
  - Bert Wheeler, actor (born 1895)
- January 19 – Ray Harroun, race car driver (born 1879)
- January 26 – Merrill C. Meigs, newspaper publisher and aviation promoter (born 1883)
- February 4
  - Eddie Baker, actor (born 1897)
  - Neal Cassady, (born 1926)
- February 7 – Nick Adams, actor (born 1931)
- February 15 – Little Walter, blues singer, musician, and songwriter (born 1930)
- February 22 – Peter Arno, cartoonist (born 1904)
- February 27 – Frankie Lymon, singer (born 1942)
- February 29 – Juanita Hall, actress (born 1901)
- March 5 – Syd Nathan, record producer, music industry executive and founder of King Records (born 1904)
- March 6 – Joseph W. Martin Jr., politician (born 1884)
- March 11 – Pearl Doles Bell, film scenarist, novelist and editor (born 1883)
- March 16 – Leon Cadore, baseball pitcher (born 1891)
- March 23 – Edwin O'Connor, journalist, novelist, and radio commentator (born 1918)
- March 24 – Alice Guy-Blaché, French film director (born 1873)
- March 30 – Bobby Driscoll, actor (born 1937)
- April 4 – Martin Luther King Jr., activist, clergyman and leader in the Civil Rights Movement (born 1929)
- April 8 – Harold D. Babcock, astronomer (born 1882)
- April 12 – Lester Melrose, record producer of the Chicago blues genre (born 1891)
- April 14 – Al Benton, baseball player (born 1911)
- April 16
  - Fay Bainter, actress (born 1893)
  - Edna Ferber, novelist, short story writer and playwright (born 1885)
- April 22 – Stephen H. Sholes, recording executive (born 1911)
- April 24
  - Tommy Noonan, actor, producer, and screenwriter (born 1921)
  - Walter Tewksbury, runner and hurdler (born 1876)
- May 5 – Albert Dekker, actor and politician (born 1905)
- May 9
  - Phil Arnold, actor (born 1909)
  - Harold Gray, cartoonist (born 1894)
  - Marion Lorne, actress (born 1883)
- May 10 – Scotty Beckett, actor and singer (born 1929)
- May 26 – Little Willie John, African-American rock and roll, rhythm and blues singer (born 1937)
- May 28 – Corbett Davis, football fullback (born 1914)
- June 1 – Helen Keller, campaigner for the deaf and blind (born 1880)
- June 2
  - Jouett Shouse, politician (born 1879)
  - R. Norris Williams, tennis player (born 1891 in Switzerland)
- June 4 – Dorothy Gish, actress (born 1898)
- June 6 – Robert F. Kennedy, younger brother of U.S. president John F. Kennedy, U.S. senator and a leading 1968 Democratic presidential candidate (born 1925)
- June 7 – Dan Duryea, actor (born 1907)
- June 15 – Wes Montgomery, jazz guitarist (born 1923)
- June 17 – Henrietta Bingham, journalist, newspaper executive, horse-breeder and anglophile (born 1901)
- July 1 – Virginia Weidler, child actress (born 1927)
- July 19 – Jack Pierce, Greek-born American make-up artist (born 1889)
- July 30 – Alexander Hall, film director, film editor and theater actor (born 1894)
- August 18 – Arthur Marshall, ragtime composer and performer (born 1881)
- August 16 – Kay Francis, actress (born 1905)
- August 30 – William Talman, actor (born 1915)
- September 7 – Harold C. Train, rear admiral in World War II, Director of the Office of Naval Intelligence (born 1887)
- September 18
  - Francis McDonald, actor (born 1891)
  - Franchot Tone, actor, director, producer (born 1905)
- September 19 – Red Foley, musician (born 1910)
- September 21 – Charles R. Jackson, writer (born 1903)
- September 23 – Dudley Dickerson, actor (born 1906)
- October 13 – Bea Benaderet, actress and comedian (born 1906)
- October 30
  - Rose Wilder Lane, writer and political theorist (born 1886)
  - Ramon Novarro, actor (born 1899 in Mexico)
- November 4 – Vern Stephens, baseball player (born 1920)
- November 8 – Wendell Corey, actor (born 1914)
- November 20 – Cathy Lewis, actress (born 1916)
- November 25 – Upton Sinclair, novelist (born 1878)
- December 5 – Fred Clark, actor (born 1914)
- December 9 – Enoch L. Johnson, political boss, businessman and crime boss (born 1883)
- December 11 – Bob Bartlett, U.S. senator from Alaska (born 1904)
- December 12 – Tallulah Bankhead, actress (born 1902)
- December 20
  - Van Nest Polglase, art director, design department head at RKO Pictures (born 1898)
  - John Steinbeck, author (born 1902)
- December 24 – Leo Otis Colbert, admiral and engineer, Director of the United States Coast and Geodetic Survey (born 1883)

== See also ==
- List of American films of 1968
- Timeline of United States history (1950–1969)
