= Richmond, Indiana explosion =

1968 natural gas and gunpowder explosions in downtown Richmond, Indiana, USA

Coordinates: 39.829067°N 84.893986°W

- Date: April 6, 1968
- Time: 1:47 PM EST
- Location: Downtown Richmond, Indiana, U.S.
- Deaths: 41
- Injuries: 150+

The Richmond, Indiana, explosion was a double explosion in the United States in 1968. It occurred at 1:47 PM EST on April 6, in downtown Richmond, Indiana. The explosions killed 41 people and injured more than 150. The primary explosion was due to natural gas leaking from one or more faulty transmission lines under the Marting Arms sporting goods store, located on the southeast corner of the intersection of 6th and Main (US 40) streets. A secondary explosion was caused by gunpowder stored inside the building.

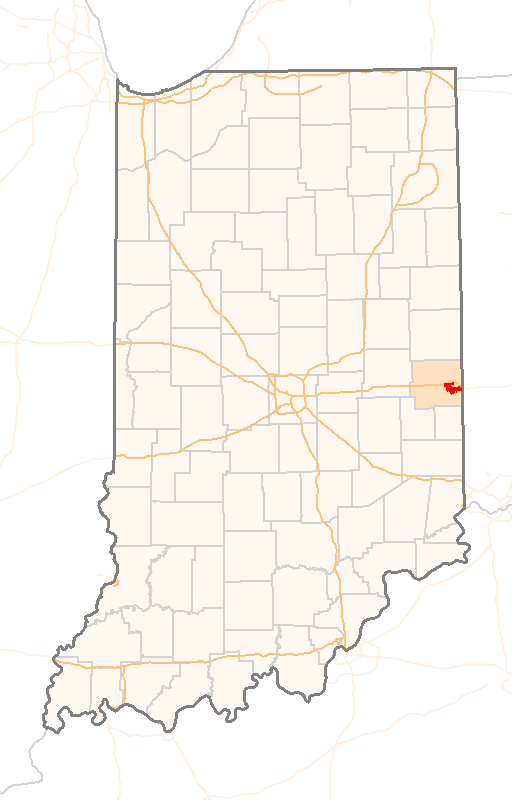
Location of Richmond in Indiana

== Cause ==
The explosion was caused by a natural gas leak from a cast iron gas main which exploded outside Marting Arms. The pipe, which had become perforated as a result of corrosion, belonged to the Richmond Gas Corporation. The gas itself was ignited by a gunshot in the firing range. It was uncertain what precisely had ignited the gunpowder, owing to the damage caused by the explosion and fire.

Gas had been smelled leaking in the area around Marting Arms for days before the explosion, and local stores would open doors to allow the fumes to ventilate out and leave buildings. A report by the U.S. Bureau of Mines found that, around this time, the Richmond Gas Corporation had found fifty-five gas leaks in its pipes, seven of which were "exceptionally large...creating hazardous conditions." The gas company had found a smaller leak between Marting Arms and a neighboring store. The perforated pipe was removed by Richmond Gas workers during the post-explosion cleanup, but the company refused to allow bureau investigators to examine it. The gas company eventually provided the pipe for examination upon the order of the Indiana Public Service Commission. Safety checks after the explosion found twenty gas leaks in the city over the next two months, although some of these may have been caused by the explosion.

== Lawsuits and fate of Richmond Gas Corporation ==
397 civil lawsuits were filed against Richmond Gas Corporation, the City of Richmond, and Marting Arms pursuant to the explosion, but only one – on behalf of decedent Blaine Scott Reeves – made it to trial. The gas company was found solely liable by a jury in Connersville, Indiana, where the case had been tried after the company requested a change of venue. Richmond Gas appealed the verdict based on alleged trial errors and on its claim that the award of $250,000 was excessive. On October 1, 1973, the First District Court of Appeals of Indiana ruled against the gas company and upheld the verdict. The corporation settled the remaining lawsuits for a reported $5 to $10 million.

In 1990 Richmond Gas Corporation was acquired by Indiana Energy, Inc. (which merged into Vectren in 2000, which merged into CenterPoint Energy in 2019).

== Aftermath ==
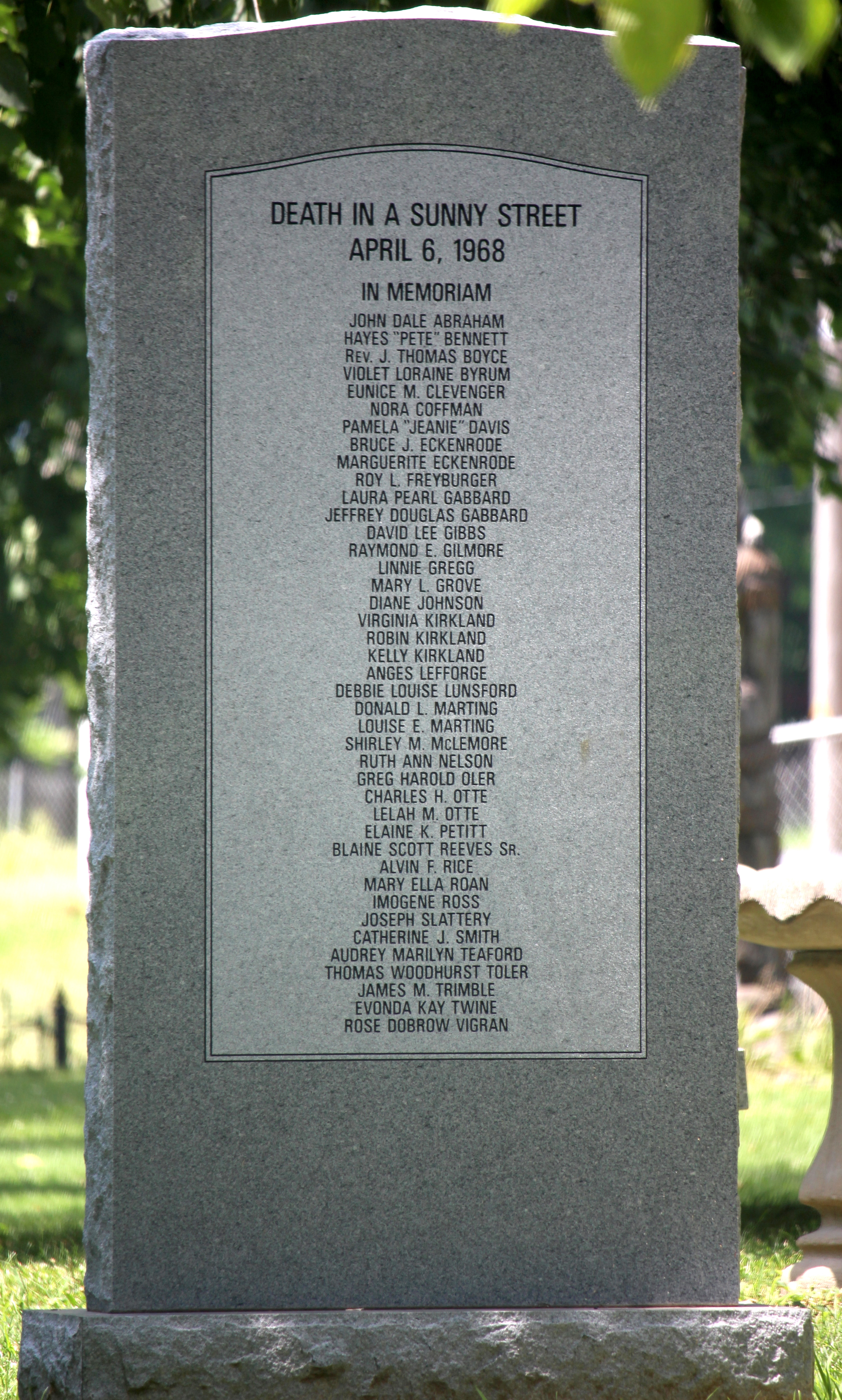
Monument honoring those who died in the April 6, 1968 explosion

Twenty buildings in and near the site of the explosion were condemned as a result thereof. An Elder-Beerman department store was built on the site of the former Marting Arms sporting goods store, ground zero for the explosion, opening in 1972. It closed in 2018 and was demolished in 2024. It will be replaced by a 150-unit housing apartment complex.

Ultimately, Main Street through downtown Richmond was closed to traffic and a downtown promenade was built in 1972 (later expanded in 1978). This five-block pedestrian mall was converted to allow the street to be reopened to traffic twenty-nine years after the explosion, in 1997, as part of an urban revitalization effort. Since 1972, US 40 has been re-routed to by-pass Main Street through downtown Richmond.

On the day of the explosion, the ongoing nationwide riots, resulting from the assassination of Martin Luther King two days earlier, overshadowed the casualties in Richmond. Many people have attested that the aftermath brought together the townspeople to work together and overcome their grief and rebuild.

The 1968 Natural Gas Pipeline Safety Act, Pub.L. 90–481 enacted into law on August 12 of that year, imposed tougher federal regulations on the gas network as a response to the disaster.

== Memorials ==
A simple curved brick memorial honoring those lost in the tragedy, who ranged in age from 8 to 72-years-old, was erected downtown, with metal lettering: In memory of the forty-one persons who lost their lives in the tragic downtown explosion April 6, 1968, and with everlasting gratitude to those who helped give rebirth to this city. The memorial stands at the south-west corner of South Fifth and Main Streets on the grounds of the Wayne County Courthouse annex.

In 2018, on the 50th anniversary of the explosion, a stone monument honoring those who died in the explosion was dedicated at the Wayne County Historical Museum.
