= Carmelo Sigona =

American graffiti artist

- Born: January 29, 1968 (age 58); Paterson, New Jersey, U.S.
- Other name: Snow
- Occupation: Artist
- Known for: Graffiti

Carmelo "Snow" Sigona (born January 29, 1968) is an American graffiti artist who has made many contributions to the hip-hop community. He has been featured in hundreds of magazines and several published books, such as The Exchange and The History of American Graffiti.

== Biography ==
Carmelo Sigona was born and raised in Paterson, New Jersey. He began his graffiti exploration at the age of ten, frequently tagging signs, abandoned factories, and delivery trucks. He was inspired by his classmates SCAT and AERO TGF, who were graffiti writers as well. Along the years, there have been many artists and illustrators who have had a big impact on him, such as Frank Frazetta, American artists Bernie Wrightson and Rick Griffin, Todd McFarlane, and Chuck Jones.
