= Sean Taylor (writer) =

American comic book and short story writer (born 1968)

- Born: Sean Taylor; May 2, 1968 (age 58)
- Area: Writer
- Notable works: Gene Simmons Dominatrix; Gene Simmons House of Horrors; Show Me A Hero; Classics Mutilated; Zombiesque

Sean Taylor (born May 2, 1968) is an American comic book and short story writer, perhaps best known for his run on Gene Simmons Dominatrix published by IDW Publishing.

== Biography ==
Taylor grew up and lived all his life in the state of Georgia, U.S.A, and he has applied that sense of Southern 'magical realism' to his writing. He began writing creating articles for trade magazines and stringing for his local paper The Alpharetta Revue.

=== Cyber Age Adventures ===
In 1999, Taylor got a job as the first staff writer for the online zine Cyber Age Adventures. While there, he soon became the Vice President of Editorial and oversaw the publication or two prose anthologies from the magazine's stories, A Private Little Corner of the Universe and Playing Solitaire. In 2011, he published a collection of all of his Cyber Age stories called Show Me A Hero, highly recommended by comics and prose pros from Marvel Comics editor Tom Brevoort to Black Lightning creator Tony Isabella.

=== Shooting Star Comics ===
In 2001, Taylor connected with other comic book writing hopefuls and helped to form the indie publisher Shooting Star Comics. Shooting Star published a quarterly anthology comic book called The Shooting Star Comics Anthology, which debuted characters including Aym Geronimo, Yellow Jacket Man of Mystery, Bed Bug, Nick Landime, and others. Taylor's own creation that ran regularly in that anthology, Fishnet Angel, originally appeared in prose in Cyber Age Adventures magazine online. In 2007, Shooting Star Comics dissolved as a company.

=== IDW and Gene Simmons ===
In 2006, Taylor signed on with IDW Publishing, publisher of comics such as 30 Days of Night and Transformers to be the writer for the flagship book of the new Simmons Comics Group, created by Kiss member Gene Simmons. The series told the adventures of Dominque Stern, a professional dominatrix who becomes a pawn in a CIA adventure that has possible roots in alien technology. Simmons described the book as "CIA meets TNA" though Taylor wrote in an afterword for the trade paperback edition that he always envisioned the series as "Mary Tyler Moore meets Crimes of Passion." The book ran for 6 issues and was collected as a trade paperback in 2008.

While at IDW Taylor also contributed the story "Nymph" for the Simmons Comics Group publication Gene Simmons House of Horrors.

=== Other work ===
Taylor has announced at his website (www.taylorverse.com) that he is officially working on an original sequel to the works of H. G. Wells called A Stitch in Time, which will tie into The Time Machine, The Invisible Man, The Food of the Gods, and The War of the Worlds; with artist George Pitcher. He has also announced that he is doing gender-twisted crime comic called Quinn: The Reckoning for Markosia Publishing with Jetta: Tales of the Toshigawa artist Martheus Wade.

== Bibliography ==
His work includes:

Comics

Shooting Star Comics Anthology #1–6, 2002–2005, published by Shooting Star Comics

Fishnet Angel: Jane Doe #1–2, 2005, published by Shooting Star Comics

"Nymph," Gene Simmons House of Horrors #1, IDW Publishing, 2007

"Nymph," reprinted in Gene Simmons House of Horrors Trade Paperback, IDW Publishing, 2007

Gene Simmons Dominatrix #1–6, IDW Publishing, 2007–2008

Gene Simmons Dominatrix Trade Paperback, IDW Publishing, 2008

The Invisible Man graphic novel adaptation, Campfire Publishing, 2009

The Tantalizing Ti-Girl, Mini-Komix, 2010

Short Story Collections and Anthologies

Show Me A Hero Published by New Babel Books, 2011

Zombiesque Published by Daw Books, 2011, featuring his story "Posthumous"

Classics Mutilated Published by IDW Publishing, 2010, featuring his story "The Fairest of Them All (A Symphony of Revenge)

A Private Little Corner of the Universe Published by Cyber Age Adventures Press, 2000, features a section of his work for the Cyber Age Adventures zine

Playing Solitaire Published by Cyber Age Adventures Press, 2000, stories edited and selected by Sean Taylor from the Cyber Age Adventures zine

O' Georgia! A Collection of Georgia's Newest and Most Promising Writers Volume 3 Features the stories "Erosion" and "No Man Is"

O' Georgia! A Collection of Georgia's Newest and Most Promising Writers Volume 2 Features the story "Cherry Hill" and the poems "Gomer" and "Old Fall"

Nonfiction

Warts and All: Comics Scripts and Tutorials Self-published, 2009 Currently only sold at conventions as a signed and numbered limited edition

Role-Playing Games

The Gotham City Sourcebook Published by West End Games/D6 Legend, 2000 Wrote the bios and histories for several of the Batman and Gotham City primary and supporting cast for this role playing game sourcebook
