= 1964 in the United States =

- Decades: 1940s; 1950s; 1960s; 1970s; 1980s
- See also: History of the United States (1964–1980); Timeline of United States history (1950–1969); List of years in the United States

Events from the year 1964 in the United States.

== Incumbents ==
=== Federal government ===
- President: Lyndon B. Johnson (D–Texas)
- Vice President: vacant
- Chief Justice: Earl Warren (California)
- Speaker of the House of Representatives: John William McCormack (D–Massachusetts)
- Senate Majority Leader: Mike Mansfield (D–Montana)
- Congress: 88th

==== State governments ====
Governors and lieutenant governors

=== Governors ===
- Governor of Alabama: George Wallace (Democratic)
- Governor of Alaska: William A. Egan (Democratic)
- Governor of Arizona: Paul Fannin (Republican)
- Governor of Arkansas: Orval Faubus (Democratic)
- Governor of California: Pat Brown (Democratic)
- Governor of Colorado: John Arthur Love (Republican)
- Governor of Connecticut: John N. Dempsey (Democratic)
- Governor of Delaware: Elbert N. Carvel (Democratic)
- Governor of Florida: C. Farris Bryant (Democratic)
- Governor of Georgia: Carl E. Sanders (Democratic)
- Governor of Hawaii: John A. Burns (Democratic)
- Governor of Idaho: Robert E. Smylie (Republican)
- Governor of Illinois: Otto Kerner Jr. (Democratic)
- Governor of Indiana: Matthew E. Welsh (Democratic)
- Governor of Iowa: Harold E. Hughes (Democratic)
- Governor of Kansas: John Anderson Jr. (Republican)
- Governor of Kentucky: Edward T. Breathitt (Democratic)
- Governor of Louisiana: Jimmie H. Davis (Democratic) (until May 12), John J. McKeithen (Democratic) (starting May 12)
- Governor of Maine: John H. Reed (Republican)
- Governor of Maryland: J. Millard Tawes (Democratic)
- Governor of Massachusetts: Endicott Peabody (Democratic)
- Governor of Michigan: George W. Romney (Republican)
- Governor of Minnesota: Karl F. Rolvaag (Democratic)
- Governor of Mississippi: Ross R. Barnett (Democratic) (until January 21), Paul B. Johnson Jr. (Democratic) (starting January 21)
- Governor of Missouri: John M. Dalton (Democratic)
- Governor of Montana: Tim M. Babcock (Republican)
- Governor of Nebraska: Frank B. Morrison (Democratic)
- Governor of Nevada: Grant Sawyer (Democratic)
- Governor of New Hampshire: John W. King (Democratic)
- Governor of New Jersey: Richard J. Hughes (Democratic)
- Governor of New Mexico: Jack M. Campbell (Democratic)
- Governor of New York: Nelson Rockefeller (Republican)
- Governor of North Carolina: Terry Sanford (Democratic)
- Governor of North Dakota: William L. Guy (Democratic)
- Governor of Ohio: Jim Rhodes (Republican)
- Governor of Oklahoma: Henry Bellmon (Republican)
- Governor of Oregon: Mark Hatfield (Republican)
- Governor of Pennsylvania: William Scranton (Republican)
- Governor of Rhode Island: John Chafee (Republican)
- Governor of South Carolina: Donald S. Russell (Democratic)
- Governor of South Dakota: Archie M. Gubbrud (Republican)
- Governor of Tennessee: Frank G. Clement (Democratic)
- Governor of Texas: John Connally (Democratic)
- Governor of Utah: George Dewey Clyde (Republican)
- Governor of Vermont: Philip H. Hoff (Democratic)
- Governor of Virginia: Albertis S. Harrison Jr. (Democratic)
- Governor of Washington: Albert D. Rosellini (Democratic)
- Governor of West Virginia: William Wallace Barron (Democratic)
- Governor of Wisconsin: John W. Reynolds Jr. (Democratic)
- Governor of Wyoming: Clifford P. Hansen (Republican)

=== Lieutenant governors ===
- Lieutenant Governor of Alabama: James B. Allen (Democratic)
- Lieutenant Governor of Alaska: Hugh Wade (Democratic)
- Lieutenant Governor of Arkansas: Nathan Green Gordon (Democratic)
- Lieutenant Governor of California: Glenn Malcolm Anderson (Democratic)
- Lieutenant Governor of Colorado: Robert Lee Knous (Democratic)
- Lieutenant Governor of Connecticut: Samuel J. Tedesco (Democratic)
- Lieutenant Governor of Delaware: Eugene Lammot (Democratic)
- Lieutenant Governor of Georgia: Peter Zack Geer (Democratic)
- Lieutenant Governor of Hawaii: William S. Richardson (Democratic)
- Lieutenant Governor of Idaho: William Drevlow (Democratic)
- Lieutenant Governor of Illinois: Samuel H. Shapiro (Democratic)
- Lieutenant Governor of Indiana: Richard O. Ristine (Republican)
- Lieutenant Governor of Iowa: W. L. Mooty (Democratic)
- Lieutenant Governor of Kansas: Harold H. Chase (Republican)
- Lieutenant Governor of Kentucky: Harry Lee Waterfield (Democratic)
- Lieutenant Governor of Louisiana: C. C. Aycock (Democratic)
- Lieutenant Governor of Massachusetts: Francis X. Bellotti (Democratic)
- Lieutenant Governor of Michigan: T. John Lesinski (Democratic)
- Lieutenant Governor of Minnesota: Alexander M. Keith (Democratic)
- Lieutenant Governor of Mississippi: Paul B. Johnson Jr. (Democratic) (until January 21), Carroll Gartin (Democratic) (starting January 21)
- Lieutenant Governor of Missouri: Hilary A. Bush (Democratic)
- Lieutenant Governor of Montana: David F. James (Democratic)
- Lieutenant Governor of Nebraska: Dwight Burney (Republican)
- Lieutenant Governor of Nevada: Paul Laxalt (Republican)
- Lieutenant Governor of New Mexico: Mack Easley (Democratic)
- Lieutenant Governor of New York: Malcolm Wilson (Republican)
- Lieutenant Governor of North Carolina: vacant
- Lieutenant Governor of North Dakota: Frank A. Wenstrom (Republican)
- Lieutenant Governor of Ohio: John William Brown (Republican)
- Lieutenant Governor of Oklahoma: Leo Winters (Democratic)
- Lieutenant Governor of Pennsylvania: Raymond P. Shafer (Republican)
- Lieutenant Governor of Rhode Island: Edward P. Gallogly (Democratic)
- Lieutenant Governor of South Carolina: Robert Evander McNair (Democratic)
- Lieutenant Governor of South Dakota: Nils Boe (Republican)
- Lieutenant Governor of Tennessee: James L. Bomar Jr. (Democratic)
- Lieutenant Governor of Texas: Preston Smith (Democratic)
- Lieutenant Governor of Vermont: Ralph A. Foote (Republican)
- Lieutenant Governor of Virginia: Mills E. Godwin Jr. (Democratic)
- Lieutenant Governor of Washington: John Cherberg (Democratic)
- Lieutenant Governor of Wisconsin: Jack B. Olson (Republican)

== Events ==
=== January ===
- January 3 – Senator Barry Goldwater of Arizona announces that he will seek the Republican nomination for president.
- January 7 – A British firm, the Leyland Motor Corp., announces the sale of 450 buses to the Cuban government, challenging the United States blockade of Cuba.
- January 8 – In his first State of the Union Address, U.S. President Lyndon Johnson declares a War on Poverty.
- January 9 – Martyrs' Day: Armed clashes between United States troops and Panamanian civilians in the Panama Canal Zone precipitate a major international crisis, resulting in the deaths of 21 Panamanians and 4 U.S. soldiers.
- January 10 – Introducing...the Beatles is released by Chicago's Vee-Jay Records to get the jump on Capitol Records' release of Meet the Beatles!, scheduled for January 20. The two record companies fight in court over Vee-Jay's release of the album.
- January 11 – United States Surgeon General Luther Leonidas Terry reports that smoking may be hazardous to one's health, the first such statement from the U.S. government.
- January 12
  - The predominantly Arab government of Zanzibar is overthrown by African nationalist rebels; a United States Navy destroyer evacuates 61 U.S. citizens.
  - Routine U.S. naval patrols of the South China Sea begin.
- January 13 – In Manchester, New Hampshire, 14-year-old Pamela Mason is murdered. Edward Coolidge is tried and convicted of the crime, but the conviction is set aside by the landmark Fourth Amendment case Coolidge v. New Hampshire (1971).
- January 15
  - The nightclub Whisky a Go Go opens its doors on Sunset Strip in Hollywood. Johnny Rivers leads the first house band at the club, which helps pave the club's way to international fame and contributes to the beginning of rock n' roll on the Strip.
  - The Teamsters union negotiates the first national labor contract in the United States.
  - San Francisco Giants make champion outfielder Willie Mays the highest-paid player in baseball when they sign him to a new $105,000 per season contract.
- January 16
  - John Glenn, the first American to orbit the Earth, resigns from the space program.
  - The musical Hello, Dolly! opens in New York City's St. James Theatre.
- January 17
  - John Glenn announces that he will seek the Democratic nomination for U.S. Senator from Ohio.
  - Roald Dahl's Charlie and the Chocolate Factory is published by Alfred A. Knopf, Inc. in the United States.
- January 18 – Plans to build the World Trade Center in New York City are announced.
- January 20 – Meet the Beatles!, the first Capitol Records Beatles album in the United States, is released.
- January 23
  - Thirteen years after its proposal and nearly two years after its passage by the United States Senate, the Twenty-fourth Amendment to the United States Constitution, prohibiting the use of poll taxes in national elections, is ratified.
  - Arthur Miller's After the Fall opens Off-Broadway. A semi-autobiographical work, it arouses controversy over his portrayal of late ex-wife Marilyn Monroe.
  - Designed by McKim, Mead & White, the Smithsonian Institution's Museum of History and Technology, predecessor of the National Museum of American History, opens to the public in Washington, D.C.
- January 27 – U.S. Senator Margaret Chase Smith, 66, announces her candidacy for the Republican presidential nomination.
- January 28 – A U.S. Air Force jet training plane that strays into East Germany is shot down by Soviet fighters near Erfurt; all 3 crew men are killed.
- January 29 – Ranger 6 is launched by NASA, on a mission to carry television cameras and crash-land on the Moon.

=== February ===
- February 1 – The Beatles vault to the #1 spot on the U.S. singles charts for the first time, with "I Want to Hold Your Hand", starting the British Invasion in America.
- February 3 – Protesting against alleged de facto school racial segregation, Black and Puerto Rican groups in New York City boycott public schools.
- February 4
  - The Government of the United States authorizes the Twenty-fourth Amendment, outlawing the poll tax.
  - General Motors introduces the Oldsmobile Vista Cruiser and the Buick Sport Wagon.
- February 6 – Cuba cuts off the normal water supply to the United States Guantanamo Bay Naval Base, in reprisal for the U.S. seizure 4 days earlier of 4 Cuban fishing boats off the coast of Florida.
- February 7
  - An all-white jury in Jackson, Mississippi, trying Byron De La Beckwith for the murder of Medgar Evers in June 1963, reports that it cannot reach a verdict, resulting in a mistrial.
  - The Beatles arrive from the UK at New York City's JFK International Airport, receiving a tumultuous reception from an estimated 4,000, marking the first occurrence of "Beatlemania" in the United States. The "Fab Four" stay in suites 1260, 1263, 1264 and 1273 of the Plaza Hotel.
- February 9 – The Beatles appear on The Ed Sullivan Show, marking their first live performance on American television. Seen by an estimated 73 million viewers, the appearance becomes the catalyst for the mid-1960s "British Invasion" of American popular music.
- February 17 – Wesberry v. Sanders (376 US 1 1964): The Supreme Court of the United States rules that congressional districts have to be approximately equal in population.
- February 23 – Chrysler's second generation Hemi racing engine is showcased at the Daytona 500. The 426 hemi-powered Plymouth of Richard Petty (#43) wins. Hemi-powered Plymouths finish in first, second and third places.
- February 25 – Sonny Liston vs. Cassius Clay: Cassius Clay beats Sonny Liston in Miami Beach, Florida, and is crowned heavyweight boxing champion of the world. This evening he celebrates in a hotel room with his three closest friends, activist Malcolm X, singer Sam Cooke and American football fullback Jim Brown, and soon afterwards changes his name.
- February 26 – U.S. politician and ex-astronaut John Glenn slips on a bathroom rug in his Columbus, Ohio apartment and hits his head on the bathtub, injuring his left inner ear, and prompting him (later that week) to withdraw from the race for the Democratic Party Senate nomination.
- February 29 – U.S. President Lyndon B. Johnson announces that the United States has developed a jet airplane (the A-11), capable of sustained flight at more than 2,000 miles per hour (3,200 km/h) and of altitudes of more than 70,000 feet (21,000 m).

=== March ===
- March 4 – President of the Teamsters, Jimmy Hoffa is convicted by a federal jury of jury tampering in 1962 and receives a jail sentence.
- March 6 – Boxer Cassius Clay announces the change of his name to Muhammad Ali.
- March 8 – Malcolm X, suspended from the Nation of Islam, says in New York City that he is forming a black nationalist party.
- March 9
  - New York Times Co. v Sullivan (376 US 254 1964): The United States Supreme Court rules that under the First Amendment, speech criticizing political figures cannot be censored.
  - The first Ford Mustang is manufactured, by the Ford Motor Company, in Dearborn, Michigan.
- March 10
  - Soviet military forces shoot down an unarmed reconnaissance bomber that had strayed into East Germany; the 3 U.S. flyers parachute to safety.
  - Henry Cabot Lodge Jr., Ambassador to South Vietnam, wins the New Hampshire Republican primary.
- March 12 – Malcolm X leaves the Nation of Islam.
- March 13 – It is falsely reported that 38 neighbors in Queens, New York City fail to respond to the cries of Kitty Genovese, 28, as she is being stabbed to death.
- March 14 – A Dallas, Texas, jury finds Jack Ruby guilty of killing John F. Kennedy assassin Lee Harvey Oswald.
- March 26 – U.S. Defense Secretary Robert McNamara delivers an address that reiterates American determination to give South Vietnam increased military and economic aid in its war against the Communist insurgency.
- March 27 – The Good Friday earthquake, the most powerful earthquake in U.S. history at a magnitude of 9.2, strikes South Central Alaska, killing 125 people and inflicting massive damage to the city of Anchorage.
- March 30 – Merv Griffin's game show Jeopardy! debuts on NBC; Art Fleming is its first host.
- March 31 – The military, backed by the U.S., overthrows Brazilian President João Goulart in a coup, starting 21 years of dictatorship in Brazil.

=== April ===
- April 2 – Mrs. Malcolm Peabody, 72, mother of Massachusetts Governor Endicott Peabody, is released on $450 bond after spending 2 days in a St. Augustine, Florida jail, for participating in an anti-segregation demonstration there.
- April 3 – Malcolm X makes his "The Ballot or the Bullet" speech in Cleveland.
- April 4
  - Three high school friends in Hoboken, N.J., open the first BLIMPIE on Washington Street.
  - The Beatles hold the top 5 positions in the Billboard Top 40 singles in the United States, an unprecedented achievement. The top songs in America as listed on April 4, in order, are: "Can't Buy Me Love", "Twist and Shout", "She Loves You", "I Want to Hold Your Hand" and "Please Please Me".
- April 7 – IBM announces the System/360 computer.
- April 8 – Four of 5 railroad operating unions strike against the Illinois Central Railroad without warning, bringing to a head a 5-year dispute over railroad work rules.
- April 10 – Demolition of the Polo Grounds sports stadium commences in New York City.
- April 12 – In Detroit, Michigan, Malcolm X delivers a speech entitled "The Ballot or the Bullet."
- April 13 – The 36th Academy Awards ceremony, hosted by Jack Lemmon, is held at Santa Monica Civic Auditorium. Tony Richardson's Tom Jones is tied with Joseph L. Mankiewicz's Cleopatra for the most award wins with four, winning Best Picture and Best Director for Richardson. The film receives the most nominations with ten. Sidney Poitier also becomes the first black actor to win the award for Best Actor.
- April 14 – A Delta rocket's third-stage motor ignites prematurely in an assembly room at Cape Canaveral, killing 3.
- April 17
  - The Ford Mustang is officially unveiled to the public.
  - Shea Stadium opens in Flushing, New York.
- April 20 – U.S. President Lyndon Johnson in New York, and Soviet Premier Nikita Khrushchev in Moscow, simultaneously announce plans to cut back production of materials for making nuclear weapons.
- April 22 – The 1964 New York World's Fair opens to celebrate the 300th anniversary of New Amsterdam being taken over by British forces under the Duke of York (later King James II) and being renamed New York in 1664. The fair runs until October 18, 1964 and reopens April 21, 1965, finally closing October 17, 1965. Although not officially sanctioned as a world's fair, due to being within 10 years of the Seattle World's Fair in 1962, so that some countries decline to attend, many have pavilions with exotic crafts, art and food.

=== May ===
- May 2
  - Senator Barry Goldwater receives more than 75% of the votes in the Texas Republican presidential primary.
  - Some 400–1,000 students march through Times Square, New York and another 700 in San Francisco, in the first major student demonstration against the Vietnam War. Smaller marches also occur in Boston, Seattle, and Madison, Wisconsin.
  - Henry Hezekiah Dee and Charles Eddie Moore, hitchhiking in Meadville, Mississippi, are kidnapped, beaten, and murdered by members of the Ku Klux Klan. Their badly decomposed bodies are found by chance in July during the search for missing activists Chaney, Goodman, and Schwerner.
- May 4 – The United States Congress recognizes Bourbon whiskey as a "distinctive product of the United States".
- May 7 – Pacific Air Lines Flight 773 crashes near San Ramon, California, killing all 44 aboard; the FBI later reports that a cockpit recorder tape indicates that the pilot and co-pilot had been shot by a suicidal passenger.
- May 12 – First draft-card burning: 12 young men in New York publicly burn their draft cards as an act of resistance to the Vietnam War.
- May 19 – The United States Department of State says that more than 40 hidden microphones have been found embedded in the walls of the U.S. Embassy in Moscow.
- May 22 – President Lyndon Johnson makes a speech at the University of Michigan, introducing the concept of the "Great Society".
- May 26 – Nelson Rockefeller defeats Barry Goldwater in the Oregon Republican primary, slowing but not stalling Goldwater's drive toward the presidential nomination.
- May 30 – Eddie Sachs and Dave MacDonald are killed in a fiery crash during the 1964 Indianapolis 500.

=== June ===
- June 2
  - Senator Barry Goldwater wins the California Republican primary, making him the overwhelming favorite for the party's nomination as President of the United States.
  - Five million shares of stock in the Communications Satellite Corporation (Comsat) are offered for sale at $20 a share, and the issue is quickly sold out.
- June 9 – In Federal Court in Kansas City, Kansas, Army deserter George John Gessner, 28, is convicted of passing United States secrets to the Soviet Union.
- June 10
  - The U.S. Senate votes cloture of the Civil Rights Bill after a 75-day filibuster.
  - The Deacons for Defense and Justice (Black self-defense organization) is founded in Jonesboro, Louisiana.
- June 12 – Pennsylvania Governor William Scranton announces his candidacy for the Republican presidential nomination, as part of a 'stop-Goldwater' movement.
- June 14 – Freedom Summer, a volunteer Civil Rights project intended to promote voter registration for as many African Americans as possible in Mississippi, begins with orientation sessions for the 300 volunteers at Western College for Women, Oxford, Ohio.
- June 19
  - U.S. Senator Edward Kennedy, 32, is seriously injured in a private plane crash at Southampton, Massachusetts; the pilot is killed.
  - Carol Doda wears a monokini for her act at the Condor Club in North Beach, San Francisco, becoming the first modern topless dancer in the United States.
- June 21
  - Civil Rights Movement: Murders of Chaney, Goodman, and Schwerner – Three Congress of Racial Equality workers, Michael Schwerner, Andrew Goodman and James Chaney, are abducted and murdered near Philadelphia, Mississippi, by local members of the White Knights of the Ku Klux Klan with local law enforcement officials involved in the conspiracy.
  - Jim Bunning pitches a perfect game for the Philadelphia Phillies.

=== July ===
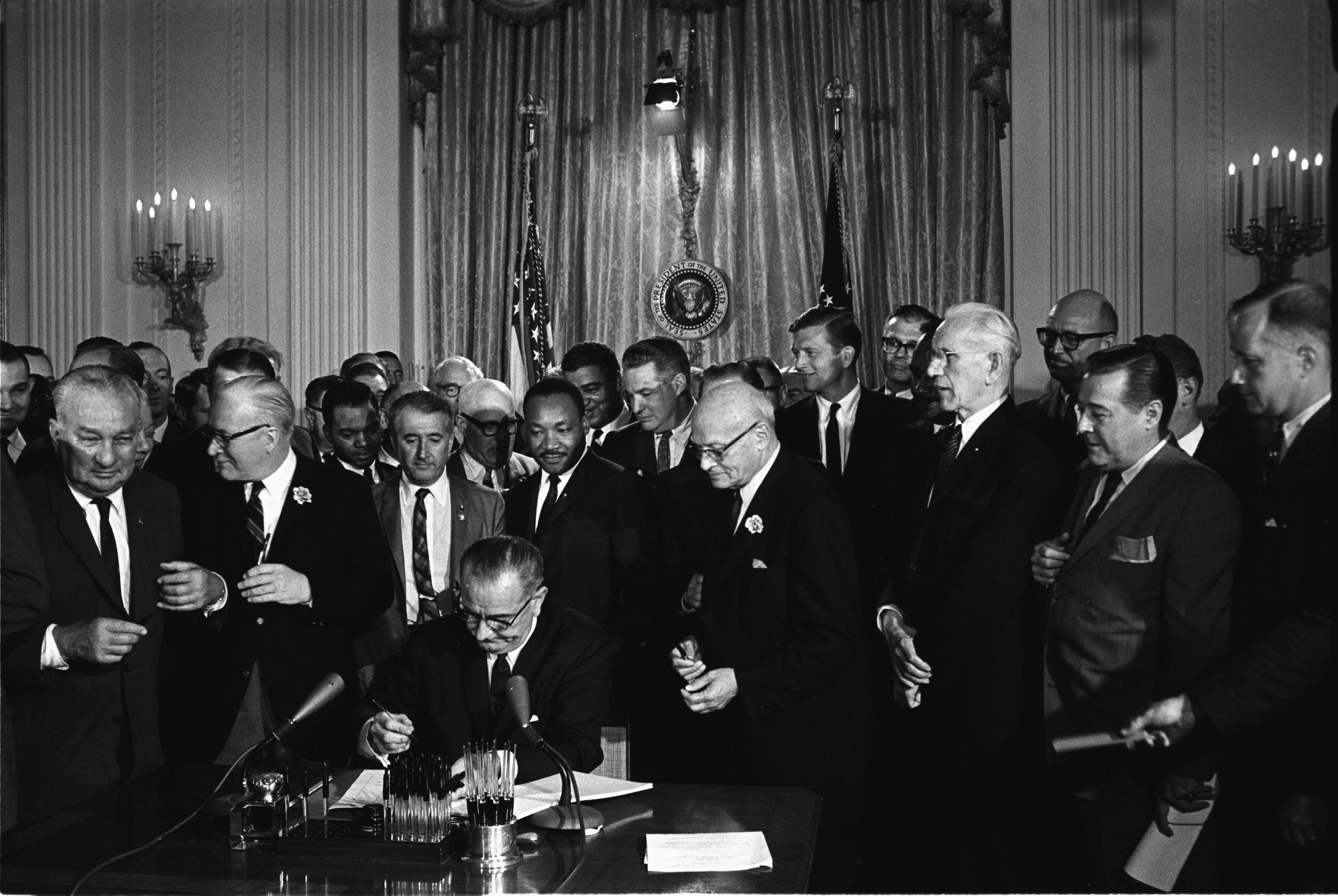
July 2: President Johnson signs the Civil Rights Act of 1964

- July 2 – President Lyndon Johnson signs the Civil Rights Act of 1964 into law, abolishing racial segregation in the United States.
- July 8 – U.S. military personnel announce that U.S. casualties in Vietnam have risen to 1,387, including 399 dead and 17 MIA.
- July 16 – At the Republican National Convention in San Francisco, U.S. presidential nominee Barry Goldwater declares that "extremism in the defense of liberty is no vice", and "moderation in the pursuit of justice is no virtue".
- July 18
  - Six days of race riots begin in Harlem, New York, apparently prompted by the shooting of a teenager.
  - False Hare is the final Warner Bros. cartoon with "target" titles.
- July 23 – The first Arby's sandwich restaurant opens in Boardman, Ohio.
- July 24 – There is a minor criticality accident at a United Nuclear Corporation Fuels recovery plant in Wood River Junction, Richmond, Rhode Island. 37-year-old Robert Peabody dies two days after the incident.
- July 27 – Vietnam War: The U.S. sends 5,000 more military advisers to South Vietnam, bringing the total number of United States forces in Vietnam to 21,000.

=== August ===
- August 1 – The final Looney Tune, Señorella and the Glass Huarache, is released before the Warner Bros. cartoon division is shut down by Jack Warner.
- August 2–4 – Vietnam War – Gulf of Tonkin incident: United States destroyers USS Maddox and USS C. Turner Joy are attacked in the Gulf of Tonkin. Air support from the carrier USS Ticonderoga sinks one gunboat, while the other two leave the battle.
- August 4 – Murders of Chaney, Goodman, and Schwerner – The bodies of Michael Schwerner, Andrew Goodman and James Chaney, murdered in June, are found.
- August 5 – Vietnam War: Operation Pierce Arrow – Aircraft from carriers USS Ticonderoga and USS Constellation bomb North Vietnam in retaliation for strikes against U.S. destroyers in the Gulf of Tonkin.
- August 7 – Vietnam War: The United States Congress passes the Gulf of Tonkin Resolution, giving U.S. President Lyndon B. Johnson broad war powers to deal with North Vietnamese attacks on U.S. forces.
- August 16 – Vietnam War: In a coup, General Nguyễn Khánh replaces Dương Văn Minh as South Vietnam's chief of state and establishes a new constitution, drafted partly by the U.S. Embassy.
- August 22 – Fannie Lou Hamer, civil rights activist and Vice Chair of the Mississippi Freedom Democratic Party, addresses the Credentials Committee of the Democratic National Convention, challenging the all-white Mississippi delegation.
- August 24–27 – The Democratic National Convention in Atlantic City nominates incumbent President Lyndon B. Johnson for a full term, and U.S. Senator Hubert Humphrey of Minnesota as his running mate.
- August 27 – Walt Disney's Mary Poppins has its world premiere in Los Angeles. It will go on to become Disney's biggest moneymaker, and winner of 5 Academy Awards, including a Best Actress award for Julie Andrews, who accepted the part after she was passed over by Jack L. Warner for the leading role of Eliza Doolittle in the film version of My Fair Lady. Mary Poppins is the first Disney film to be nominated for Best Picture.
- August 28–30 – Philadelphia 1964 race riot: Tensions between African American residents and police lead to 341 injuries and 774 arrests.

=== September ===
- September 4 – The last execution in the U.S. for a crime other than murder occurs in Alabama, as James Cobern is put to death for robbery.
- September 7 – President Lyndon Johnson's re-election campaign airs the controversial and influential "Daisy" ad.
- September 12 – Canyonlands National Park is established.
- September 16 – Shindig! premieres on ABC television, featuring the top musical acts of the decade.
- September 17 – Bewitched, starring Elizabeth Montgomery, premieres on ABC.
- September 21 – The North American XB-70 Valkyrie makes its first flight at Palmdale, California.
- September 26 – The sitcom Gilligan's Island, starring Bob Denver as Gilligan premieres on CBS.
- September 27 – The Warren Commission Report, the first official investigation of the assassination of John F. Kennedy, is published.

=== October ===
- October 1 – Three thousand student activists at University of California, Berkeley surround and block a police car from taking a CORE volunteer arrested for not showing his ID, when he violated a ban on outdoor activist card tables. This protest eventually evolves into the Berkeley Free Speech Movement.
- October 10–24 – The United States participates in the 1964 Summer Olympics in Tokyo, Japan and ranks first for the 10th time, bringing home 36 gold, 26 silver and 28 bronze medals for a total of 90 medals.
- October 14 – Martin Luther King Jr., a leader in the American civil rights movement, becomes the youngest recipient of the Nobel Peace Prize, which was awarded to him for leading non-violent resistance to end racial prejudice in the United States.
- October 15
  - Craig Breedlove's jet-powered car Spirit of America goes out of control on Bonneville Salt Flats in Utah and makes skid marks 5.97 miles (9.61 km) long.
  - The St. Louis Cardinals defeat the visiting New York Yankees 7–5 to win the World Series in 7 games (4–3), ending a long run of 29 World Series appearances in 44 seasons for the Bronx Bombers (also known as the Yankee Dynasty).
- October 18 – The New York World's Fair closes for the year (it reopens April 21, 1965).
- October 20 – Former President Herbert Hoover dies in New York City.
- October 21 – The film version of the hit Lerner and Loewe Broadway stage musical My Fair Lady premieres in New York City. The movie stars Belgian-born Audrey Hepburn in the role of Eliza Doolittle (with her singing voice dubbed by Marni Nixon) and English actor Rex Harrison repeating his stage performance as Professor Henry Higgins, and which will win him his only Academy Award for Best Actor. The film will win seven other Oscars, including Best Picture, but Hepburn will not be nominated. Critics interpret this as a rebuke to studio executive Jack L. Warner for choosing Ms. Hepburn over English singer Julie Andrews.
- October 22 – A 5.3 kiloton nuclear device is detonated at the Tatum Salt Dome, 21 miles (34 km) from Hattiesburg, Mississippi, as part of the Vela Uniform program. This test is the Salmon phase of the Atomic Energy Commission's Project Dribble.
- October 27 – In the Democratic Republic of the Congo, rebel leader Christopher Gbenye takes 60 Americans and 800 Belgians hostage.
- October 29 – A collection of irreplaceable gemstones, including the 565 carats (113.0 g) Star of India, is stolen from the American Museum of Natural History in New York City.
- October 31 – Campaigning at Madison Square Garden in New York City, President Lyndon Johnson pledges the creation of the Great Society.
- October – Dr. Robert Moog demonstrates his prototype synthesizers.

=== November ===
November 3: LBJ re-elected in a landslide

- November 1 – Mortar fire from North Vietnamese forces rains on the USAF base at Biên Hòa, South Vietnam, killing 4 U.S. servicemen, wounding 72, and destroying 5 B-57 jet bombers and other planes.
- November 3 – U.S. presidential election, 1964: Incumbent U.S. President Lyndon B. Johnson defeats Republican challenger Barry Goldwater with over 60 percent of the popular vote.
- November 5 – Mariner program: Mariner 3, a U.S. space probe intended for Mars, is launched from Cape Kennedy but fails.
- November 13 – Bob Pettit (St. Louis Hawks) becomes the first NBA player to score 20,000 points.
- November 19 – The United States Department of Defense announces the closing of 95 military bases and facilities, including the Brooklyn Navy Yard, the Brooklyn Army Terminal, and Fort Jay, New York.
- November 28
  - Mariner program: NASA launches the Mariner 4 space probe from Cape Kennedy toward Mars to take television pictures of that planet in July 1965.
  - Vietnam War: United States National Security Council members, including Robert McNamara, Dean Rusk, and Maxwell Taylor, agree to recommend a plan for a 2-stage escalation of bombing in North Vietnam, to President Lyndon B. Johnson.

=== December ===
- December 1 – Vietnam War: U.S. President Lyndon B. Johnson and his top-ranking advisers meet to discuss plans to bomb North Vietnam (after some debate, they agree on a 2-phase bombing plan).
- December 3 – Berkeley Free Speech Movement: Police arrest about 800 students at the University of California, Berkeley, following their takeover of and massive sit-in at the Sproul Hall administration building. The sit-in most directly protested the U.C. Regents' decision to punish student activists for what many thought had been justified civil disobedience earlier in the conflict.
- December 6 – The 1-hour stop-motion animated special Rudolph the Red-Nosed Reindeer, based on the popular Christmas song, is broadcast for the first time, on NBC. It becomes a Christmas tradition, despite moving to CBS in 1972.
- December 10 – Martin Luther King Jr. is awarded the Nobel Peace Prize in Oslo, Norway.
- December 11
  - Sam Cooke, African American singer-songwriter, is shot and killed at a motel in Los Angeles, California.
  - Che Guevara addresses the United Nations General Assembly; a bazooka attack is launched at the Headquarters of the United Nations in New York City.
- December 14 – Heart of Atlanta Motel v. United States (379 US 241 1964): The U.S. Supreme Court rules that, in accordance with the Civil Rights Act of 1964, establishments providing public accommodations must refrain from racial discrimination.
- December 15 – The Washington Post publishes an article about James Hampton, who had built a glittering religious throne out of recycled materials.
- December 18
  - In the wake of deadly riots in January over control of the Panama Canal, the U.S. offers to negotiate a new canal treaty.
  - The deadly Christmas flood of 1964 begins, affecting the United States' Pacific Northwest and some of Northern California. It continues until January 7 and results in 19 deaths, damage to 10 towns, serious damage to 20 major highway and county bridges, and the loss of 4,000 head of livestock.
- December 27 – The Cleveland Browns defeat the Baltimore Colts in the NFL Championship Game.

=== Undated ===
- Dr. Farrington Daniels' book Direct Use of the Sun's Energy is published by Yale University Press.

=== Ongoing ===
- Cold War (1947–1991)
- Space Race (1957–1975)
- Vietnam War, U.S. involvement (1964–1973)

== Births ==
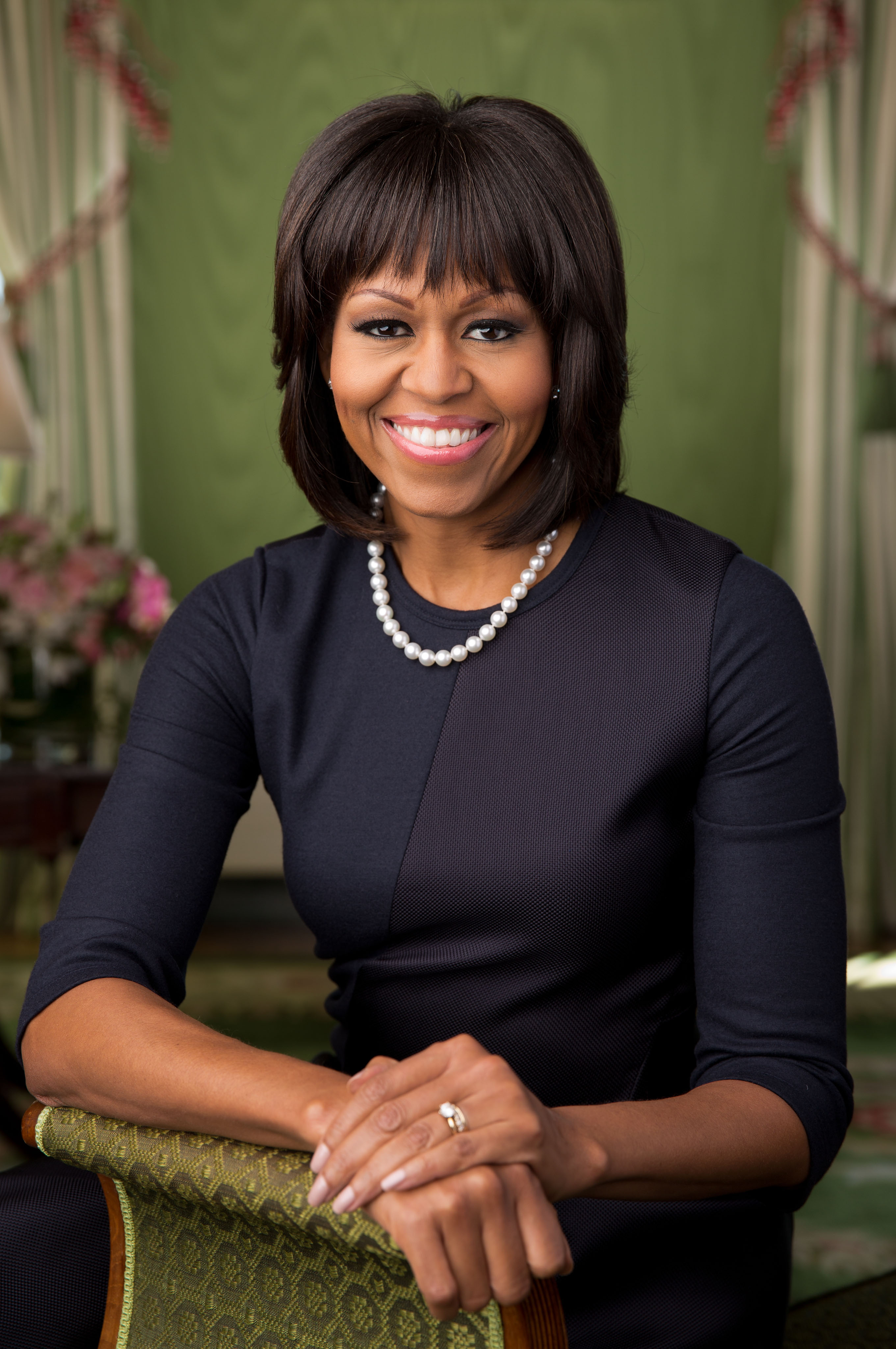
Michelle Obama

=== January ===
- January 1
  - Juliana Donald, actress
  - Dedee Pfeiffer, film and television actress
- January 3 – Jon Gibson, Christian musician
- January 4 – Dot-Marie Jones, shot putter (competed as Dot Jones) and actress
- January 6
  - Colin Cowherd, talk show host
  - Charles Haley, American football player and coach
  - Jacqueline Moore, wrestler
  - Anthony Scaramucci, financier, entrepreneur, and political figure
- January 7 – Nicolas Cage, actor, producer and director
- January 10 – Karen and Sarah Josephson, synchronized swimmers
- January 12 – Jimmy John Liautaud, entrepreneur and founder of Jimmy John's
- January 13 Jeff Bezos founder of amazon
- January 14 – Shepard Smith, broadcast journalist
- January 17 – Michelle Obama, lawyer, first African-American First Lady of the United States as wife of the 44th president of the United States, Barack Obama
- January 20 – Fareed Zakaria, journalist
- January 25 – Billy Andrade, golfer
- January 29 – Andre Reed, American football player and sportscaster

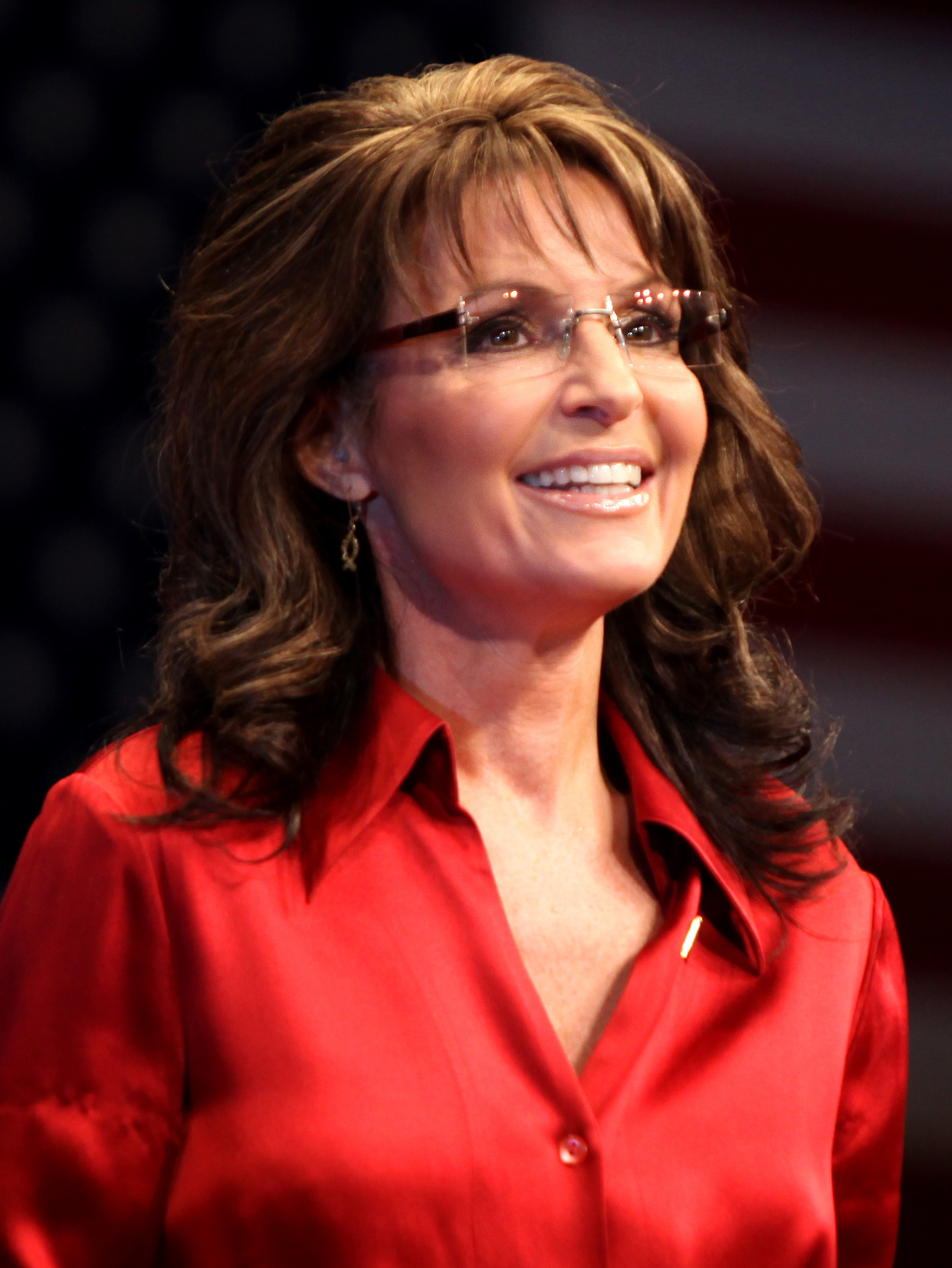
Sarah Palin

=== February ===
- February 4 – LeRoy E. Cain, aerospace engineer
- February 10 – Glenn Beck, television and radio host, conservative political commentator, author, television network producer, filmmaker and entrepreneur
- February 11
  - Sarah Palin, politician, Governor of Alaska from 2006 to 2009, and 2008 Republican vice-presidential candidate
  - Ken Shamrock, mixed martial arts fighter
- February 15
  - Chris Farley, actor and comedian (d. 1997)
  - Charles J. Otto, politician (died 2025)
  - Mark Price, basketball player
- February 17
  - Jim Jordan, politician
  - Buster Olney, journalist
  - Angelica Page, actress, director, producer and screenwriter
- February 18 – Matt Dillon, actor and film director
- February 19
  - Jennifer Doudna, biochemist
  - Jonathan Lethem, fiction writer
  - Richard A. Scott, illustrator
- February 20
  - Willie Garson, character actor (died 2021)
  - French Stewart, screen actor
- February 22 – Ed Boon, video game designer
- February 24 – Chris Austin, country music singer (died 1991)

=== March ===
- March 2
  - Mike Von Erich, professional wrestler (died 1987)
  - Tim Layana, baseball pitcher player (died 1999)
- March 3 – Rod Jones, American football tight end (died 2018)
- March 4
  - Paul Bostaph, thrash metal drummer
  - Tom Lampkin, baseball player
- March 6
  - Skip Ewing, country singer
  - Yvette Wilson, African American screen actress and comedian (died 2012)
- March 7
  - Bret Easton Ellis, fiction writer
  - Wanda Sykes, African American comedian and actress
- March 9 – Steve Wilkos, retired police officer and talk show host
- March 11 – Vinnie Paul, drummer (Pantera, Damageplan, Hellyeah) (died 2018)
- March 15 – Rockwell, musician
- March 18 – Bonnie Blair, speed skater
- March 23 – Hope Davis, actress
- March 24 – Steve Souza, singer (Exodus)
- March 25
  - LisaGay Hamilton, actress
  - Mike Henry, actor and voice actor
  - Vince Offer, writer, director, comedian and pitchman
- March 26
  - Todd Barry, stand-up comedian, actor and voice actor
  - Cynthia MacGregor, tennis player (died 1996)
  - Ed Wasser, actor
- March 29
  - Michael A. Jackson, Maryland State Senator
  - Catherine Cortez Masto, U.S. Senator from Nevada
  - Ming Tsai, Chinese-American chef
  - Jill Goodacre, actress and former model
- March 30
  - Tracy Chapman, singer-songwriter
  - Ian Ziering, actor and voice actor

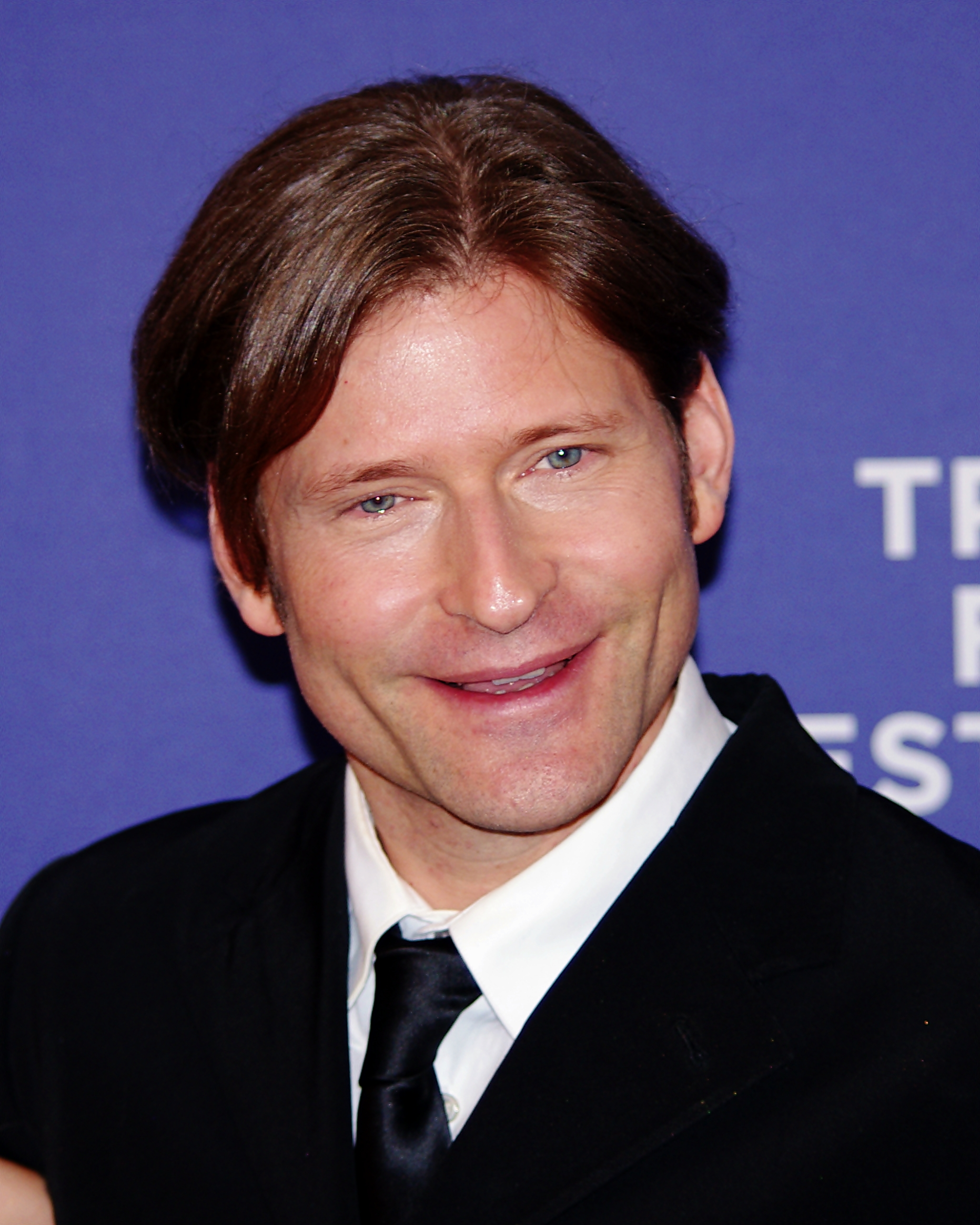
Crispin Glover

=== April ===
- April 4
  - David Cross, actor, writer and stand-up comedian
  - Robbie Rist, actor, voice actor, singer and musician
- April 6
  - Tim Walz, politician
- April 8
  - Biz Markie, rapper and DJ (died 2021)
  - Lisa Guerrero, Hispanic American actress, model and sportscaster/reporter
- April 9
  - Doug Ducey, 23rd Governor of Arizona
  - Lisa Guerrero, Hispanic actress, model and sportscaster/reporter
- April 13 – Page Hannah, television and film actress
- April 14
  - Brian Adams, professional wrestler (died 2007)
  - Jeff Andretti, race car driver
  - Greg Battle, American-Canadian football player
  - Stuart Duncan, bluegrass musician
  - Jim Grabb, tennis player
- April 16
  - David Kohan, screenwriter and producer
  - Dave Pirner, singer, songwriter and producer
- April 17
  - Lela Rochon, actress
  - Maynard James Keenan, singer, actor, and winemaker, frontman of Tool
- April 19 – Harris Barton, American football player
- April 20
  - John Carney, American football player
  - Crispin Glover, actor, author, director, screenwriter, publisher and recording artist
  - Sean A. Moore, writer (died 1998)
- April 21 – Michael Louden, actor (died 2004)
- April 24
  - Cedric the Entertainer, actor and comedian
  - Augusta Read Thomas, composer
- April 25
  - Hank Azaria, voice actor
  - Wes Freed, outsider artist (died 2022)
- April 28
  - L'Wren Scott, fashion designer (suicide 2014)
  - David Hampton, con artist and robber (died 2003)

=== May ===
- May 1 – Will Kimbrough, singer-songwriter, guitarist and producer
- May 4 – Gary Holt, guitarist (Exodus and Slayer)
- May 6 – Dana Hill, actress (died 1996)
- May 7
  - Ronnie Harmon, American football player
  - Leslie O'Neal, American football player
- May 8 – Bobby Labonte, race car driver
- May 11
  - Billy Bean, baseball player (died 2024)
  - Tim Blake Nelson, actor, writer, and director
  - Katie Wagner, television personality
- May 12 – Geechy Guy, comedian (died 2023)
- May 13
  - Ronnie Coleman, retired professional IFBB bodybuilder, 8x Mr Olympia
  - Stephen Colbert, comedian, political commentator, and television personality; host of The Late Show with Stephen Colbert
- May 14 – Suzy Kolber, sportscaster
- May 15 – Michael Gerson, journalist and speechwriter (died 2022)
- May 16 – John Salley, basketball player and talk show host
- May 17 – Nancy Benoit, professional wrestling valet and model (died 2007)
- May 22 – Marcus Dupree, American football player
- May 27 – Adam Carolla, comedic radio and television personality
- May 28 – Duane Ward, baseball player (died 2026)
- May 30
  - Tom Morello, musician and political activist (Rage Against the Machine, Audioslave, Prophets of Rage)
  - Wynonna Judd, country singer

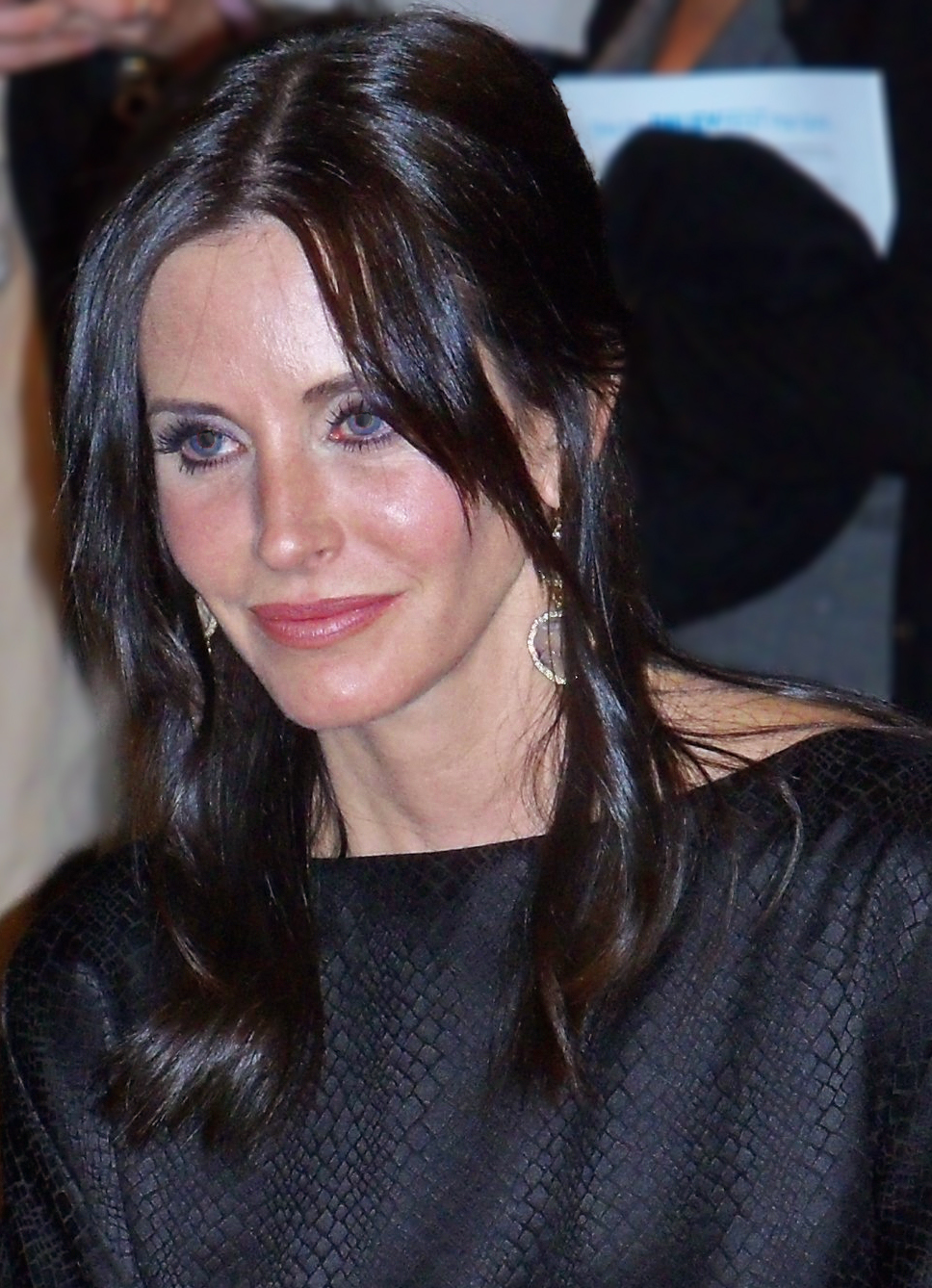
Courteney Cox

=== June ===
- June 3
  - Daniel Lieberman, paleoanthropologist
  - Kerry King, guitarist (Slayer)
- June 7
  - Judie Aronson, actress
  - Judith Neelley, serial killer
- June 9 – Wayman Tisdale, NBA basketball star and smooth jazz musician (died 2009)
- June 10 – Kate Flannery, actress
- June 12
  - Kent Jones, journalist
  - Paula Marshall, actress
- June 14 – E. Elias Merhige, director
- June 15 – Courteney Cox, actress, producer, and director
- June 19
  - Bill Barretta, actor, puppeteer, producer and director
  - Laura Ingraham, radio host and political commentator
- June 20 – Michael Landon Jr., actor, director, writer, and producer
- June 21
  - Doug Savant, actor
  - Josh Pais, actor
- June 22
  - Cadillac Anderson, basketball player
  - Amy Brenneman, actress
  - Dan Brown, author
- June 23 – Clete Blakeman, American football referee
- June 24 – Kari Kennell, actress
- June 27 – Michael Reilly Burke, actor
- June 30 – Mark Waters, screenwriter, director and film producer

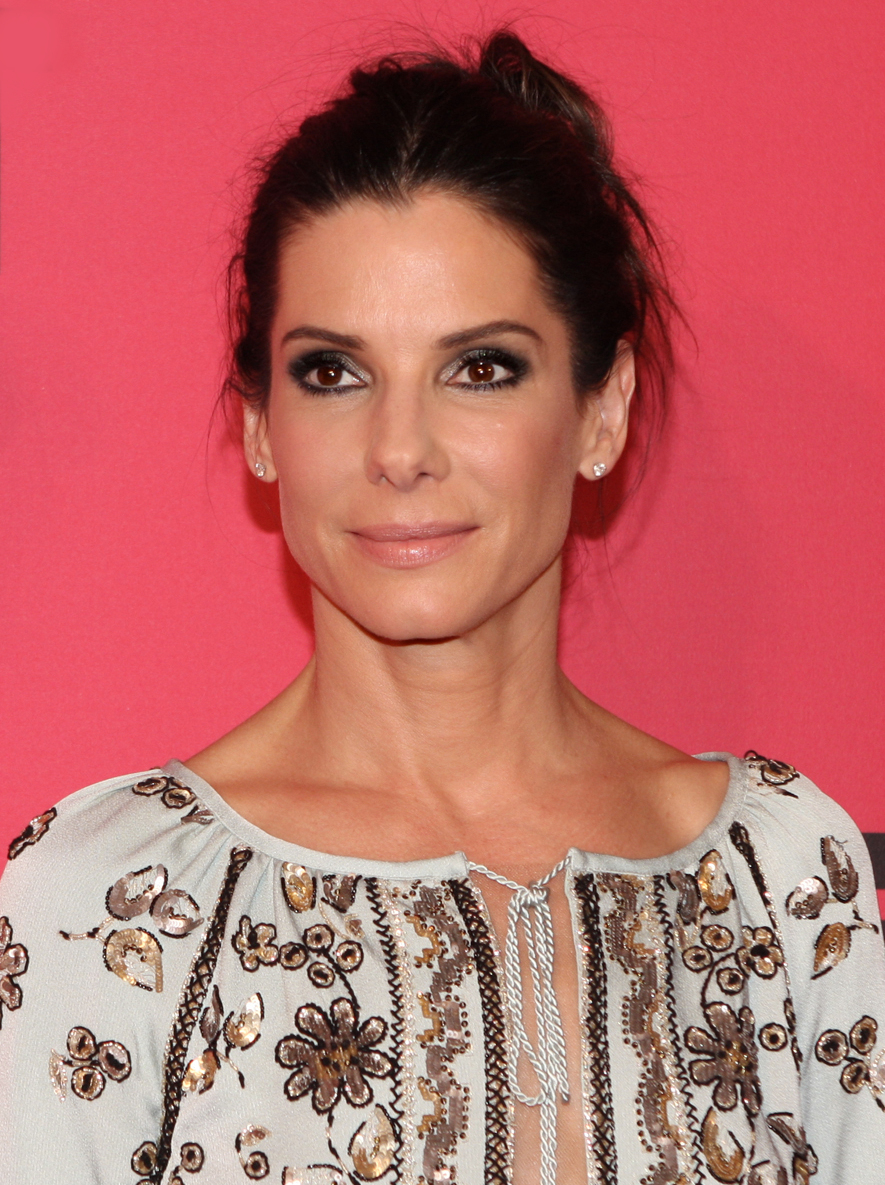
Sandra Bullock

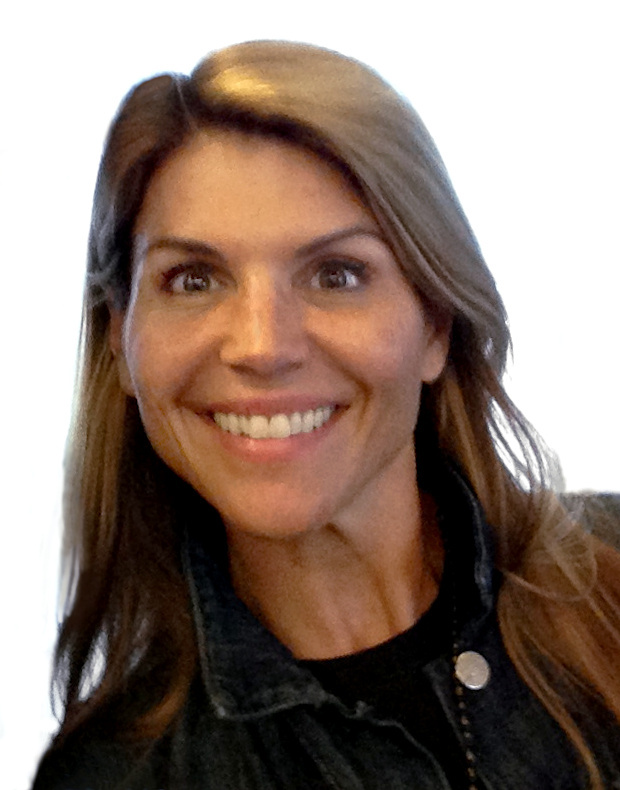
Lori Loughlin

=== July ===
- July 1
  - Paul Coyne, TV producer and editor
  - M Otis Beard, writer, singer/songwriter
- July 3 – Peyton Reed, television and film director
- July 4 – Mark Slaughter, singer and musician
- July 5
  - Jimmy Demers, singer-songwriter
  - Ronald D. Moore, screenwriter and television producer
- July 6 – John Ottman, film composer and editor
- July 7 – Tracy Reiner, actress
- July 9 – Courtney Love, actress, artist, author, musician, singer-songwriter and Kurt Cobain's wife
- July 10 – Urban Meyer, college football player and coach
- July 13 – Charlie Hides, drag queen and comedian
- July 14 – Mike Morasky, composer, visual effects artist, director, and programmer
- July 15 – John Brzenk, armwrestler
- July 17
  - Heather Langenkamp, actress
  - Craig Morgan, country music singer-songwriter
- July 18 – Wendy Williams, media personality
- July 19
  - Peter Dobson, actor
  - Teresa Edwards, basketball player
- July 20
  - Chris Cornell, singer (Soundgarden, Audioslave, Temple of the Dog) (d. 2017)
  - Dean Winters, actor
- July 21 – Susan Swift, actress
- July 22 – David Spade, comedian, actor and television personality
- July 24 – Barry Bonds, baseball player
- July 26 – Sandra Bullock, actress
- July 28 – Lori Loughlin, actress

=== August ===
- August 3 – Joan Higginbotham, African-American astronaut and engineer
- August 5 – Adam Yauch, rapper (Beastie Boys) (died 2012)
- August 7 – Tom McGrath, voice actor, animator, screenwriter, and film director
- August 11 – Lawrence Monoson, actor
- August 16
  - Jimmy Arias, tennis player
  - William Salyers, actor
- August 20 – Markus Flanagan, actor
- August 22
  - Trey Gowdy, lawyer and U.S. Representative
  - Andrew Wilson, film actor and director
  - Tom Gibis, voice actor
- August 23 – Wendy Pepper, fashion designer (died 2017)
- August 24 – Mark Cerny, video game programmer
- August 25 – Blair Underwood, actor and director
- August 26 – Sabine Hyland, anthropologist
- August 28 – Felicia Taylor, anchor-correspondent

=== September ===
- September 1
  - Holly Golightly, author and illustrator
  - Charlie Robison, singer-songwriter and guitarist
  - David West, baseball player (died 2022)
- September 2 – Jimmy Banks, soccer defender (died 2019)
- September 3
  - Adam Curry, American-Dutch businessman and television host, co-founded Mevio
  - Spike Feresten, screenwriter and producer
  - Holt McCallany, actor
- September 4 – Anthony Weiner, U.S. Congressman
- September 6
  - Todd Palin, husband of politician Sarah Palin
  - Rosie Perez, screen actress
  - John E. Sununu, U.S. Senator from New Hampshire from 2003 to 2009
- September 8
  - Michael Johns, health care executive and presidential speechwriter
  - Mitchell Whitfield, actor and voice actor
  - Raven, professional wrestler
- September 10 – Donna De Lory, singer and dancer
- September 11 – Ellis Burks, baseball player and manager
- September 12 – Greg Gutfeld, television personality
- September 14
  - Faith Ford, actress
  - Stephen Dunham, actor (died 2012)
- September 18 – Holly Robinson Peete, actress and singer
- September 19
  - Kim Richards, actress
  - Trisha Yearwood, country singer
- September 24 – Jeff Krosnoff, race car driver (died 1996)
- September 26 – Scott Brower, ice hockey goaltender (died 1998)
- September 28 – Janeane Garofalo, actress and comedian

=== October ===
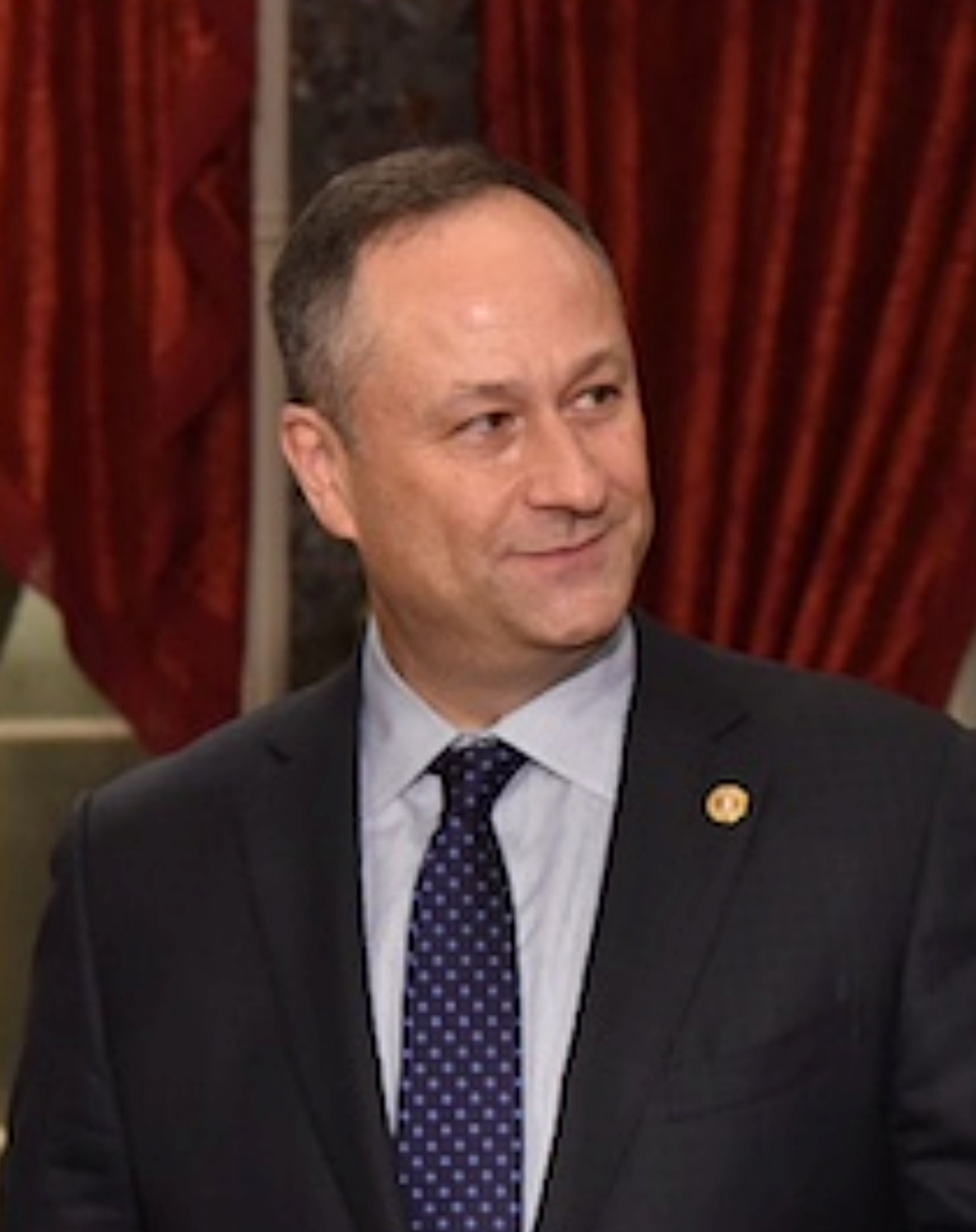
Doug Emhoff

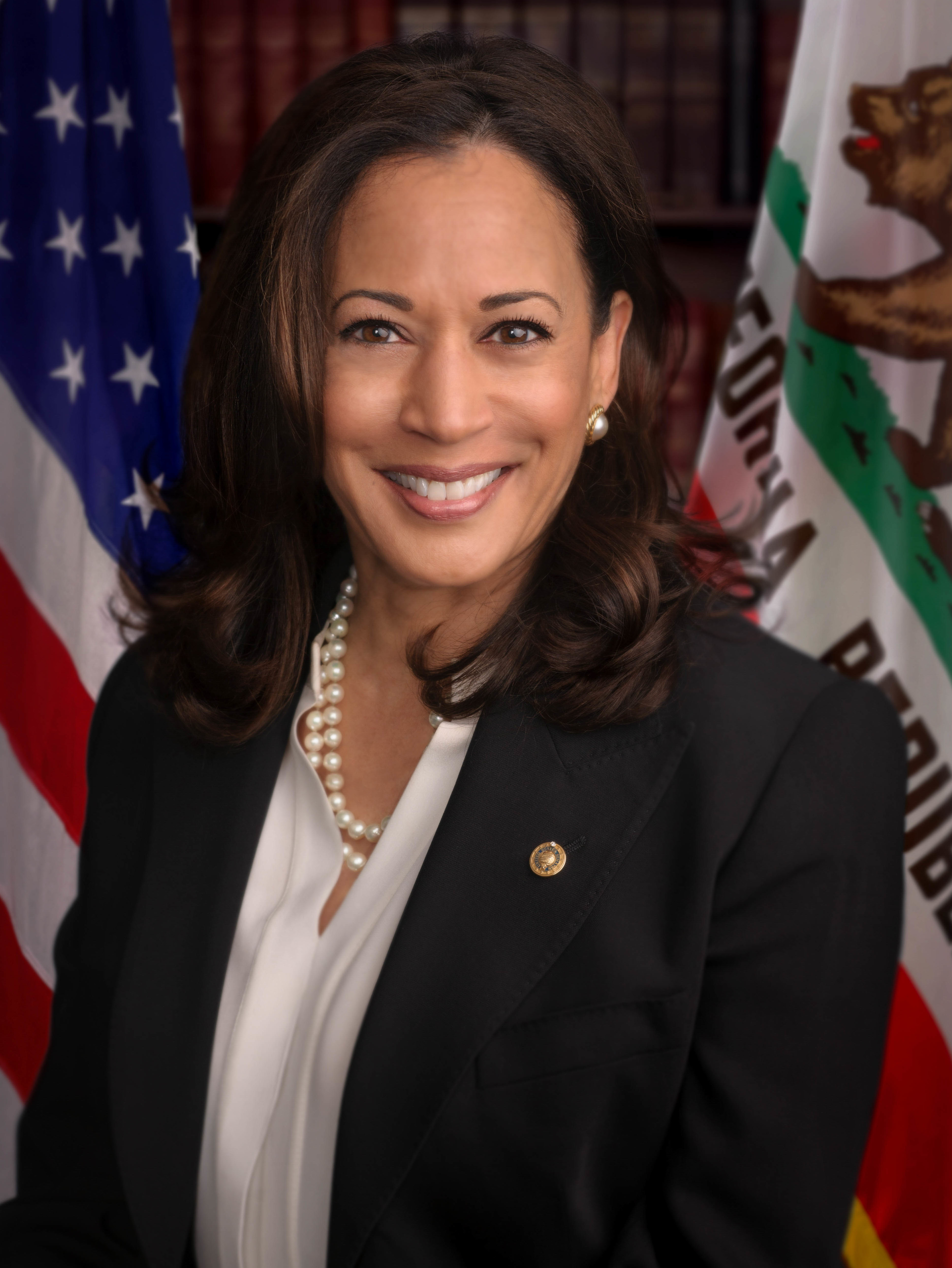
Kamala Harris

- October 1 – Christopher Titus, comedian and actor
- October 7 – Dan Savage, author and journalist
- October 8 – CeCe Winans, African-American Christian musician
- October 12 – Jane McAlevey, union organizer and political commentator (died 2024)
- October 13
  - Matt Walsh, actor, comedian, director, and writer
  - Gordy Hoffman, screenwriter and director
  - Doug Emhoff, Second Gentleman of the United States
- October 14
  - Joe Girardi, baseball player-manager
  - Jim Rome, sports TV and radio host
- October 19 – Ty Pennington, carpenter, model and television personality
- October 20 – Kamala Harris, 49th (and first female) vice president of the United States from 2021 to 2025
- October 22 – TobyMac, Christian musician
- October 23 – Robert Trujillo, Metallica bassist
- October 25
  - Dwight Garner, American football player (died 2022)
  - Kevin Michael Richardson, African-American actor and voice actor
- October 30
  - Tabitha St. Germain, American-born Canadian actress
  - Mark Steven Johnson, screenwriter, film director, and producer

=== November ===
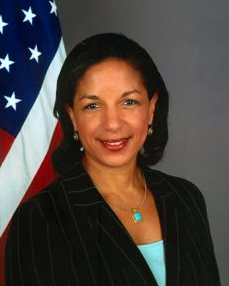
Susan Rice

- November 1
  - Sophie B. Hawkins, singer-songwriter
  - Daran Norris, actor and voice actor
- November 4 – Douglas Wilson, television personality and interior designer
- November 7 – Dana Plato, actress (died 1999)
- November 10 – Kenny Rogers, baseball player
- November 11
  - Calista Flockhart, actress
  - Philip McKeon, actor (died 2019)
- November 12
  - Vic Chesnutt, folk rock singer-songwriter and guitarist (brute. and The Undertow Orchestra) (died 2009)
  - David Ellefson, rock bassist and songwriter (Megadeth, Avian and F5)
  - Michael Kremer, development economist, recipient of the Nobel Memorial Prize in Economic Sciences
- November 14
  - Rockie Lynne, singer-songwriter and guitarist
  - Joseph Simmons, rapper
  - Patrick Warburton, actor and voice artist
- November 17
  - Mitch Williams, baseball player
  - Susan Rice, diplomat and National Security Advisor from 2013 to 2017
- November 18 – Seth Joyner, African-American football player
- November 19
  - Fred Diamond, mathematician
  - Shawn Holman, baseball pitcher
  - Eric Musselman, college basketball coach (Sacramento Kings)
- November 21 – Shane Douglas, wrestler
- November 23 – Boyd Kestner, actor
- November 24
  - Garret Dillahunt, actor
  - Chris Reccardi, animator (died 2019)
- November 25 – Mark Lanegan, singer-songwriter (died 2022)
- November 27
  - Robin Givens, African-American actress
  - Adam Shankman, film director, producer, dancer, author, actor, and choreographer
- November 28
  - Giorgi Bagaturov, Georgian-Armenian chess grandmaster
  - Michael Bennet, U.S. Senator from Colorado from 2009
  - Paul Kostacopoulos, college baseball coach
  - Michelle McKormick, talk radio personality
  - Roy Tarpley, basketball player
  - Craig Wilson, baseball third baseman

=== December ===
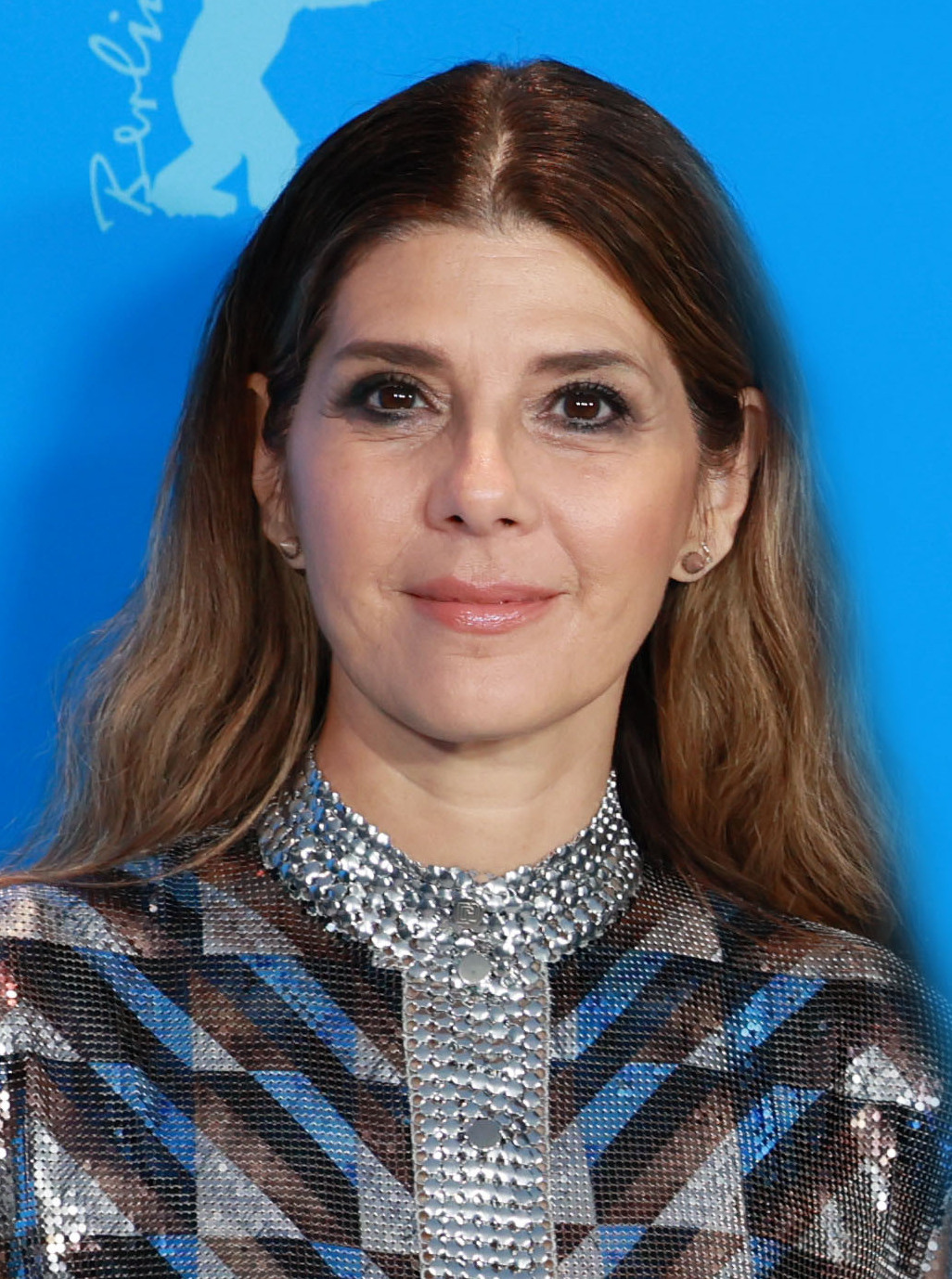
Marisa Tomei

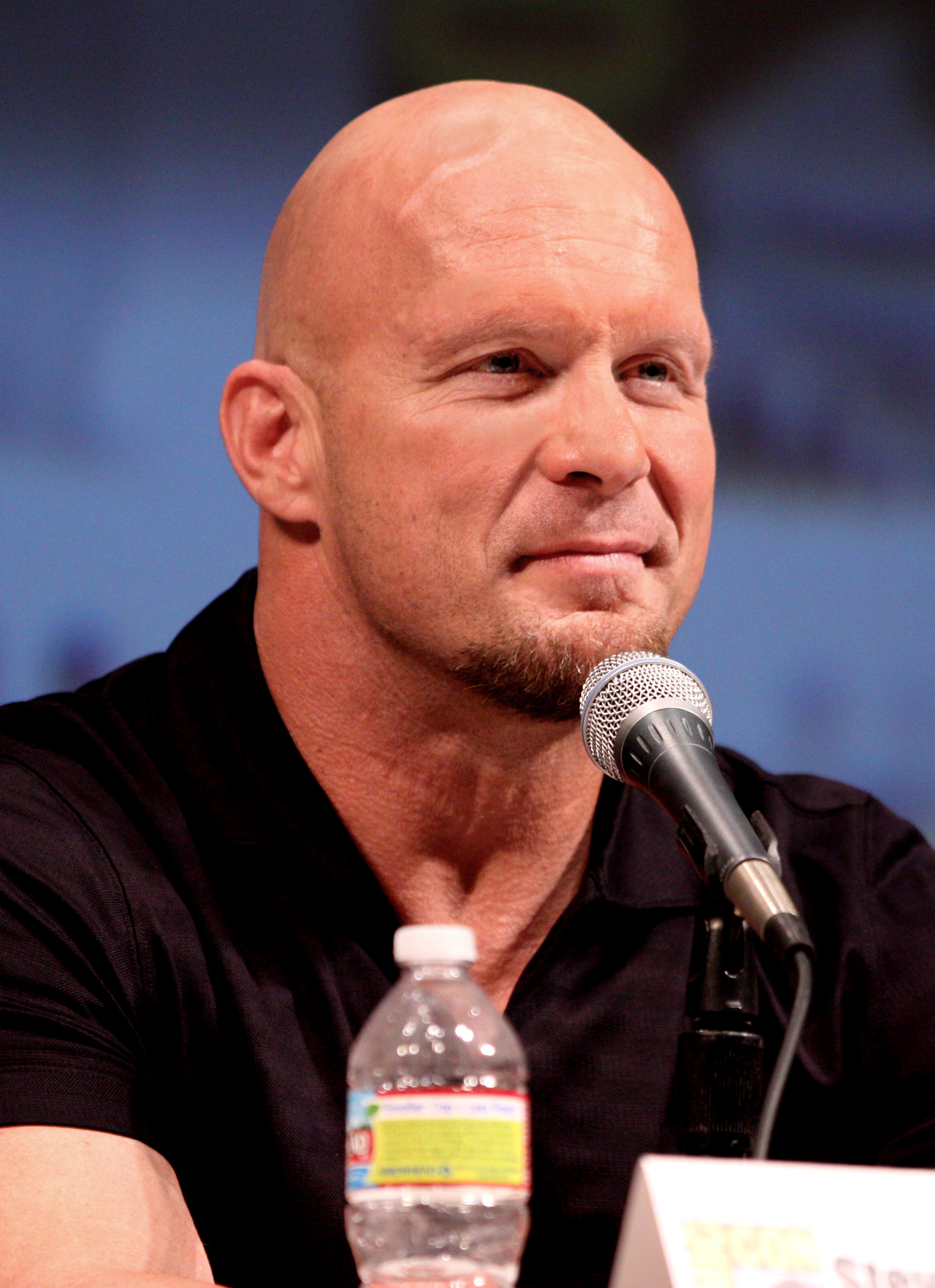
Stone Cold Steve Austin

- December 3
  - Darryl Hamilton, baseball player (died 2015)
  - Scott Huckabay, guitarist
- December 4
  - Chelsea Noble, actress
  - Jonathan Goldstein, actor, director and musician[
  - Marisa Tomei, actress
- December 7
  - Patrick Fabian, actor
  - Curtis Hughes, wrestler
  - Peter Laviolette, ice hockey coach
- December 10 – Bobby Flay, chef and author
- December 12
  - Haywood Jeffires, American football player and coach
  - Sabu, professional wrestler
  - Evan Wright, writer (died 2024)
- December 13 – Tony Roper, stock car racing driver (died 2000)
- December 14 – Karey Kirkpatrick, screenwriter and director
- December 15 – Jerry Ball, American football player
- December 16 – Billy Ripken, baseball player
- December 17 – Steve Marmel, television writer and producer
- December 18
  - Stone Cold Steve Austin, professional wrestler
  - Cledus T. Judd, Country comedy singer
- December 20 – Mark Coleman, martial artist
- December 21 – Daniel Suarez, novelist
- December 22 – Mike Jackson, former MLB pitcher
- December 27 – Theresa Randle, actress
- December 29
  - Michael Cudlitz, actor
  - Josh Harris, American investor and sports team owner
- December 30 – George Newbern, actor
- December 31 – Michael McDonald, actor and comedian

== Deaths ==
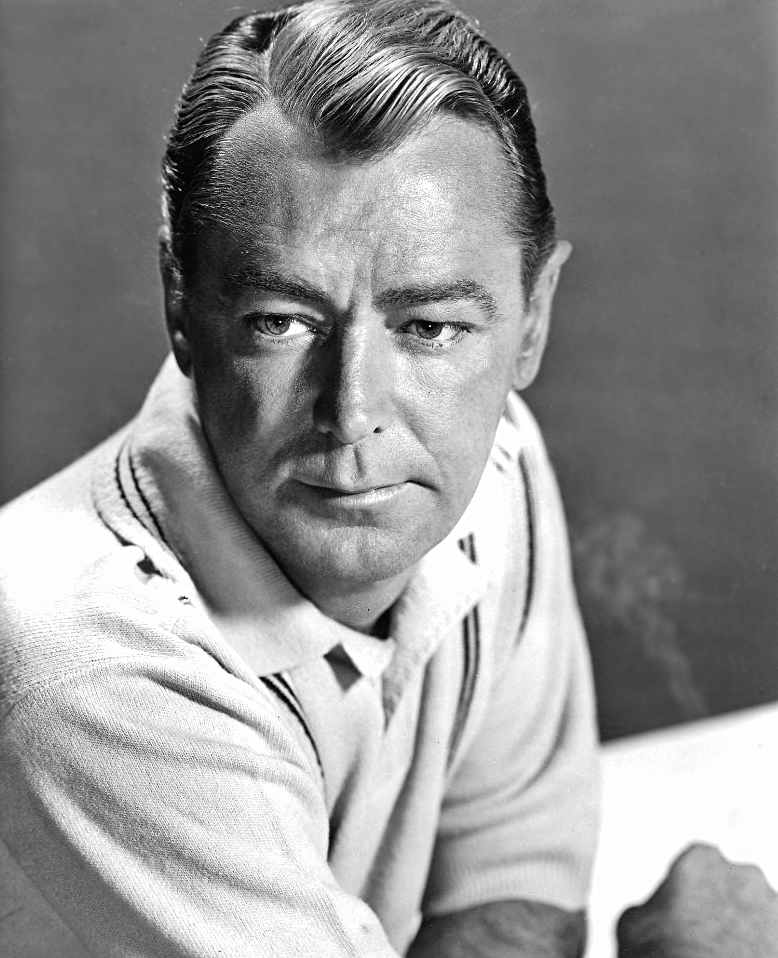
Alan Ladd

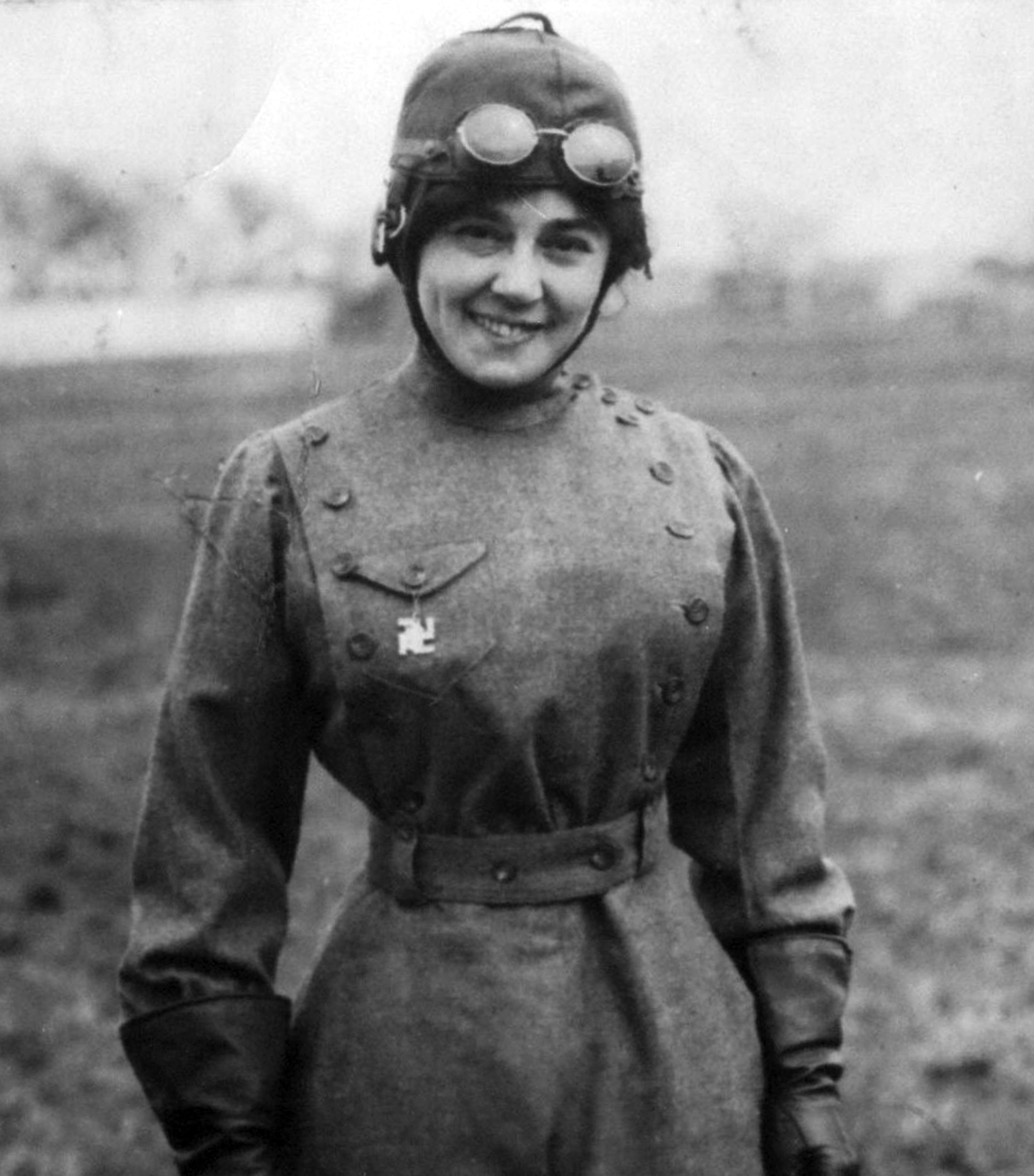
Matilde Moisant

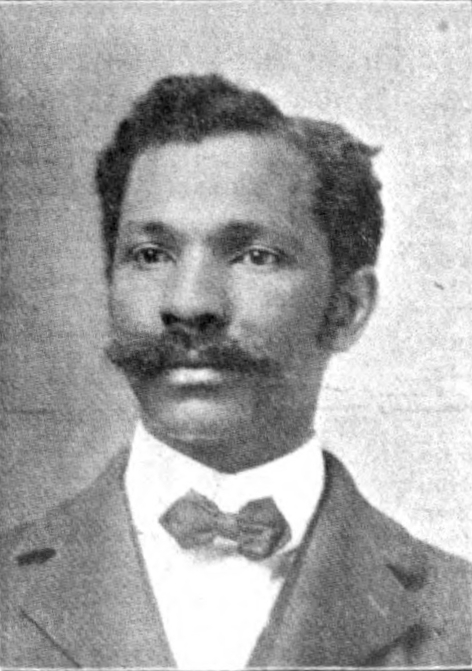
James M. Canty

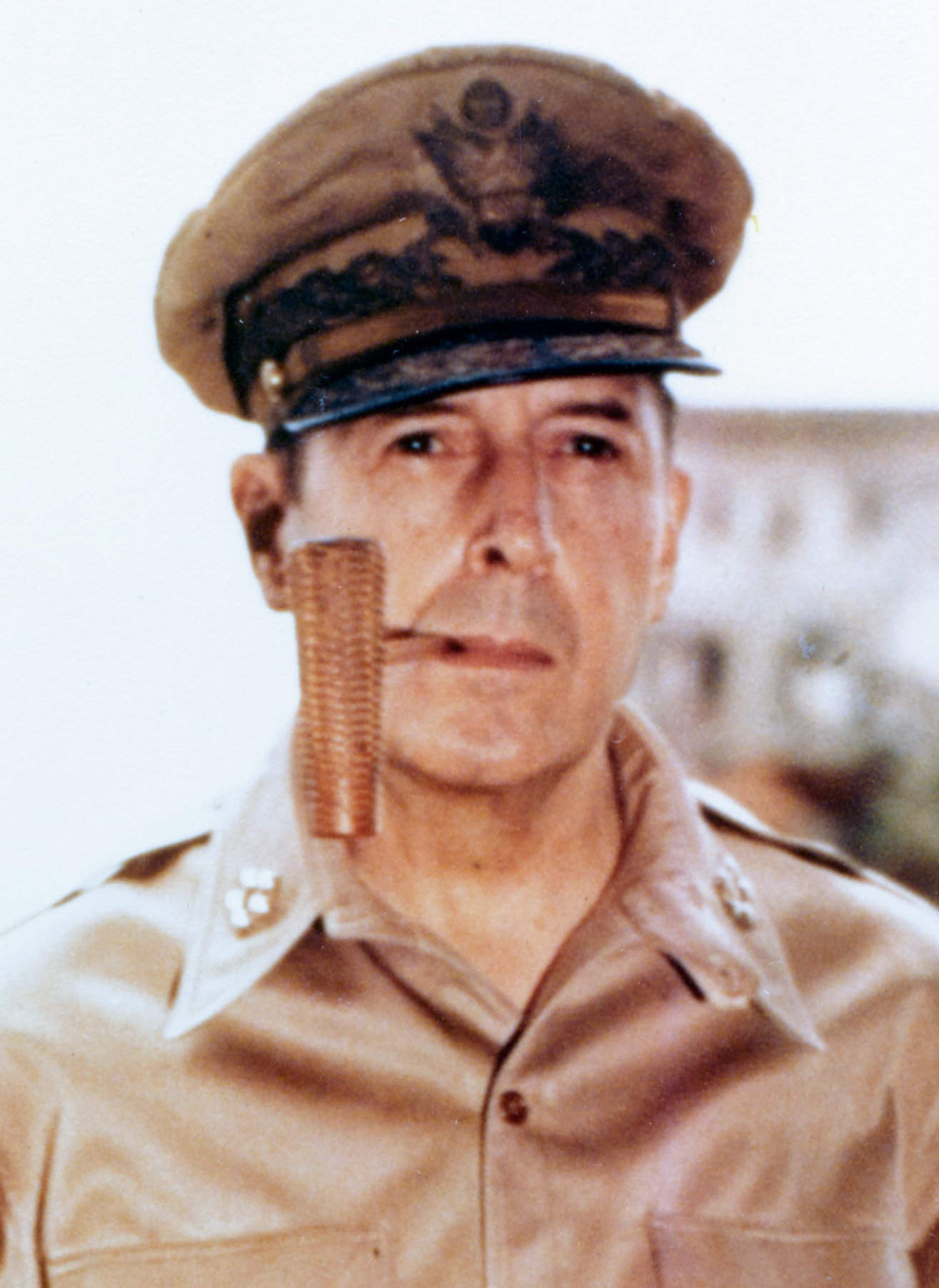
Douglas MacArthur

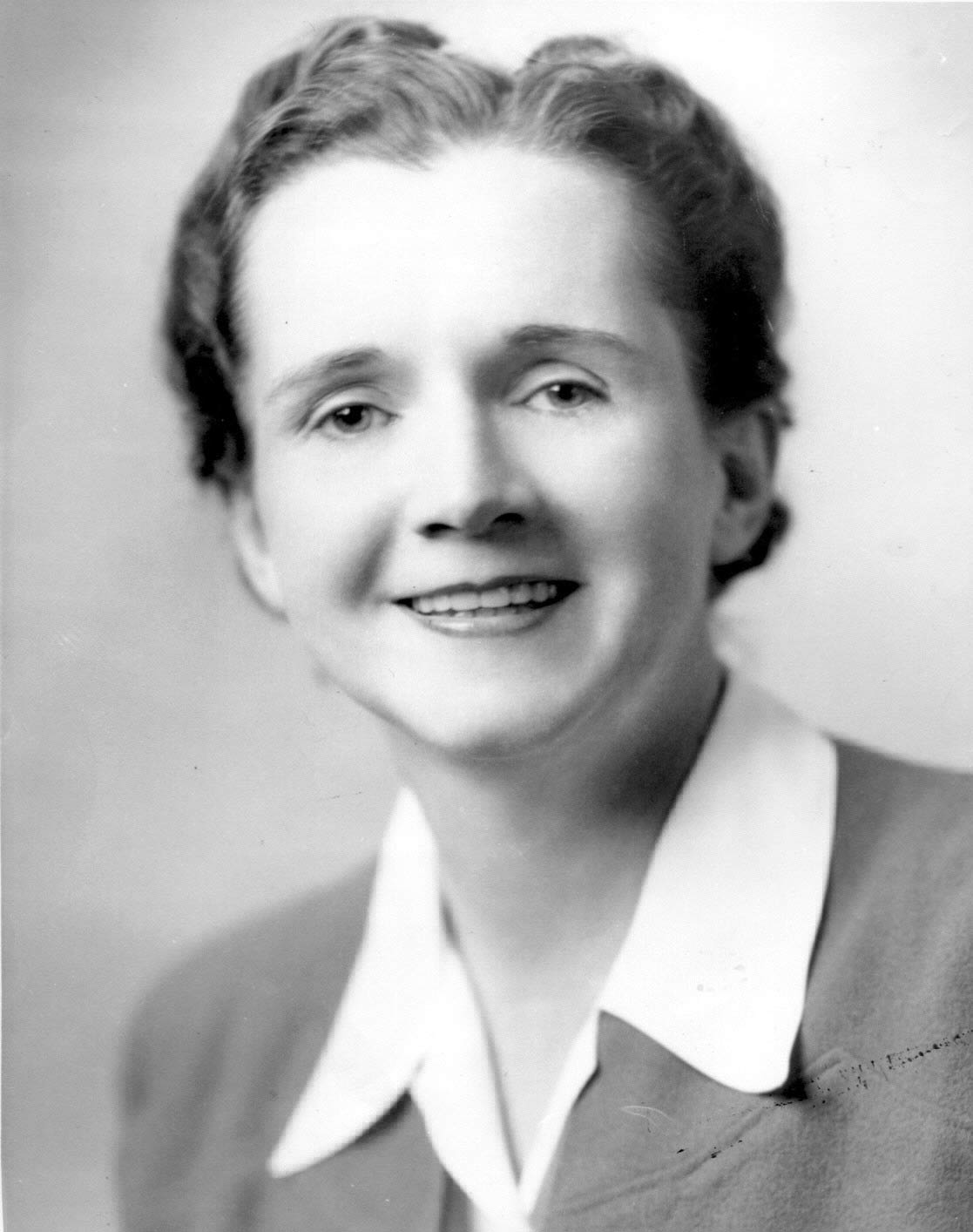
Rachel Carson

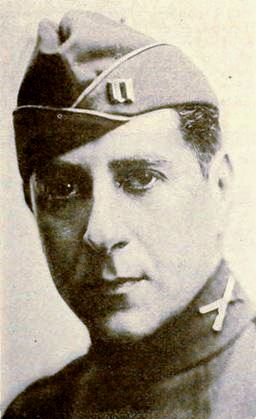
Robert Warwick

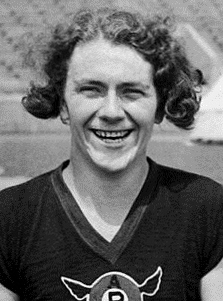
Lillian Copeland

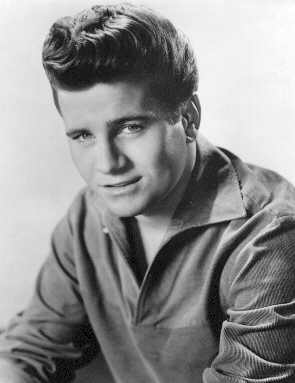
Johnny Burnette

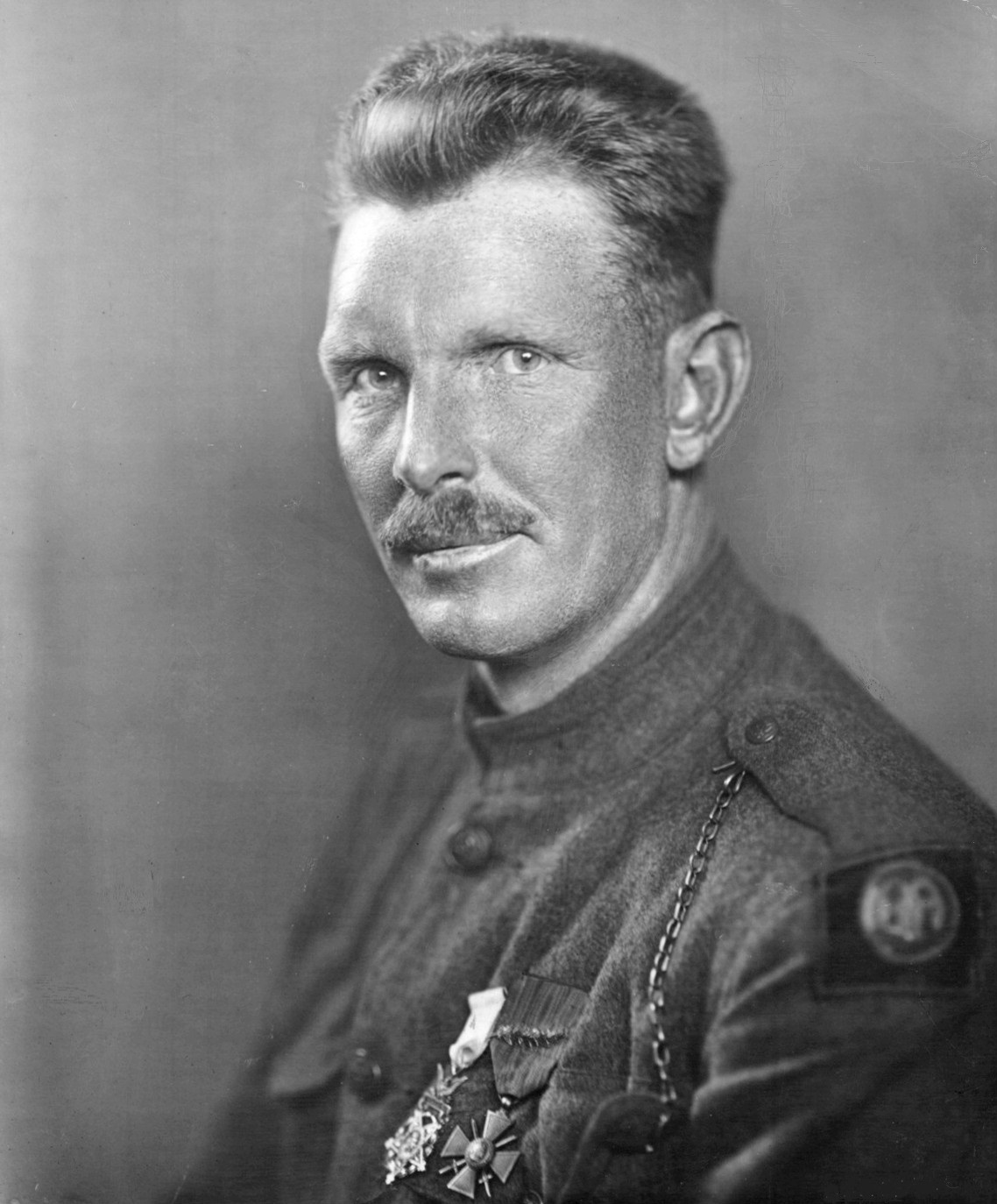
Alvin York

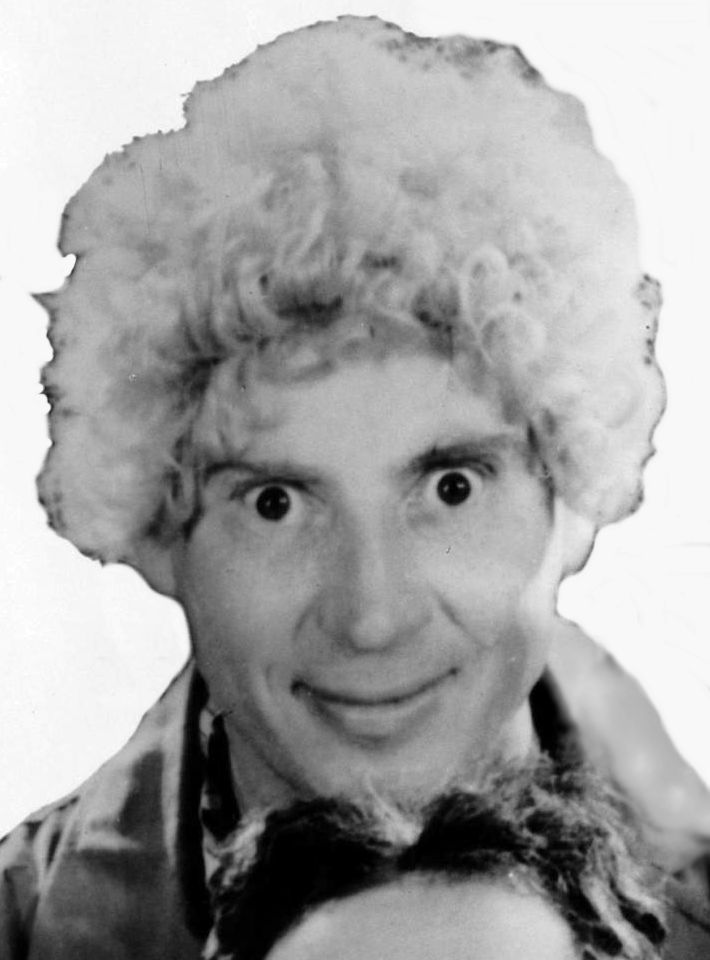
Harpo Marx

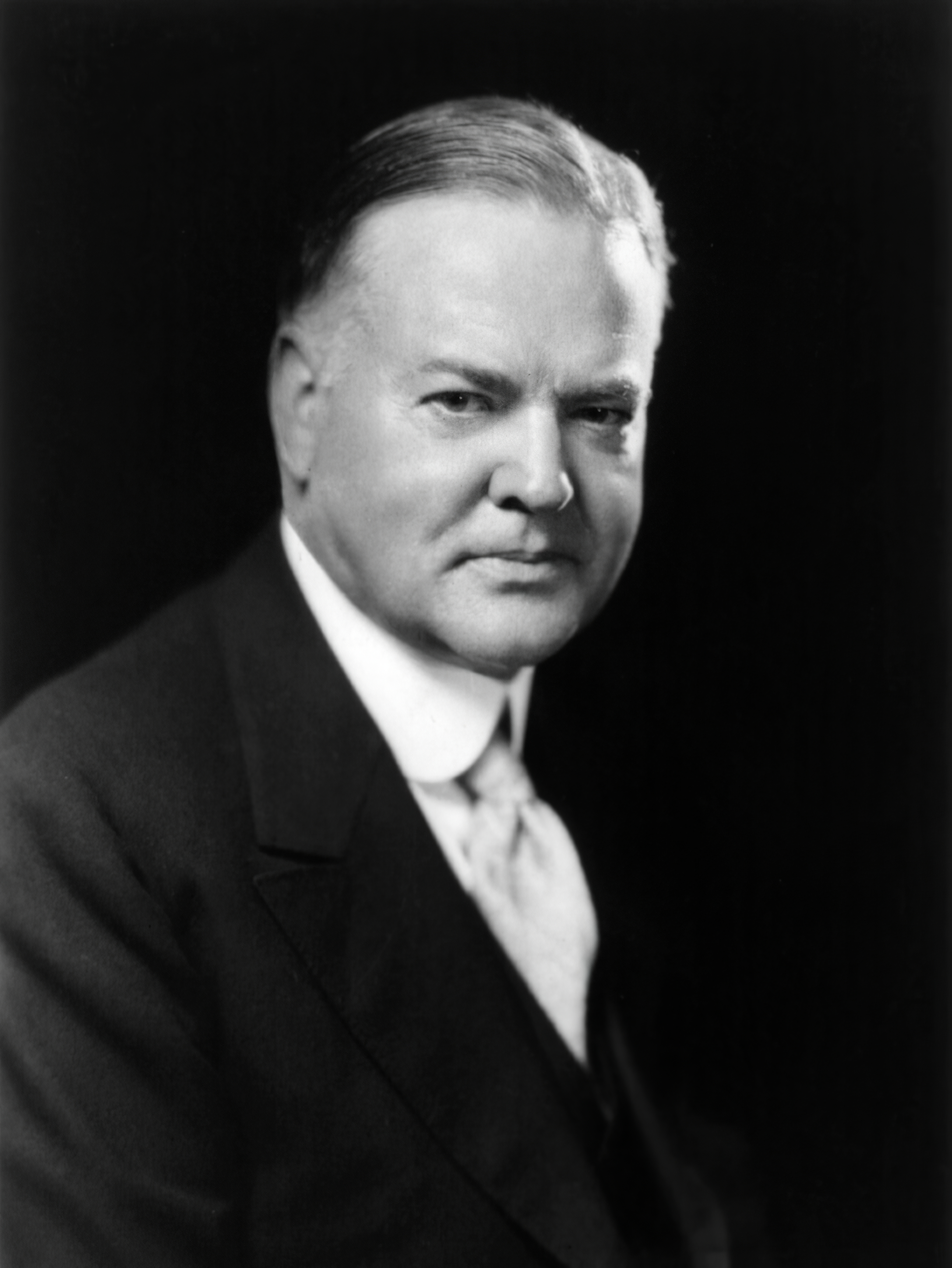
Herbert Hoover

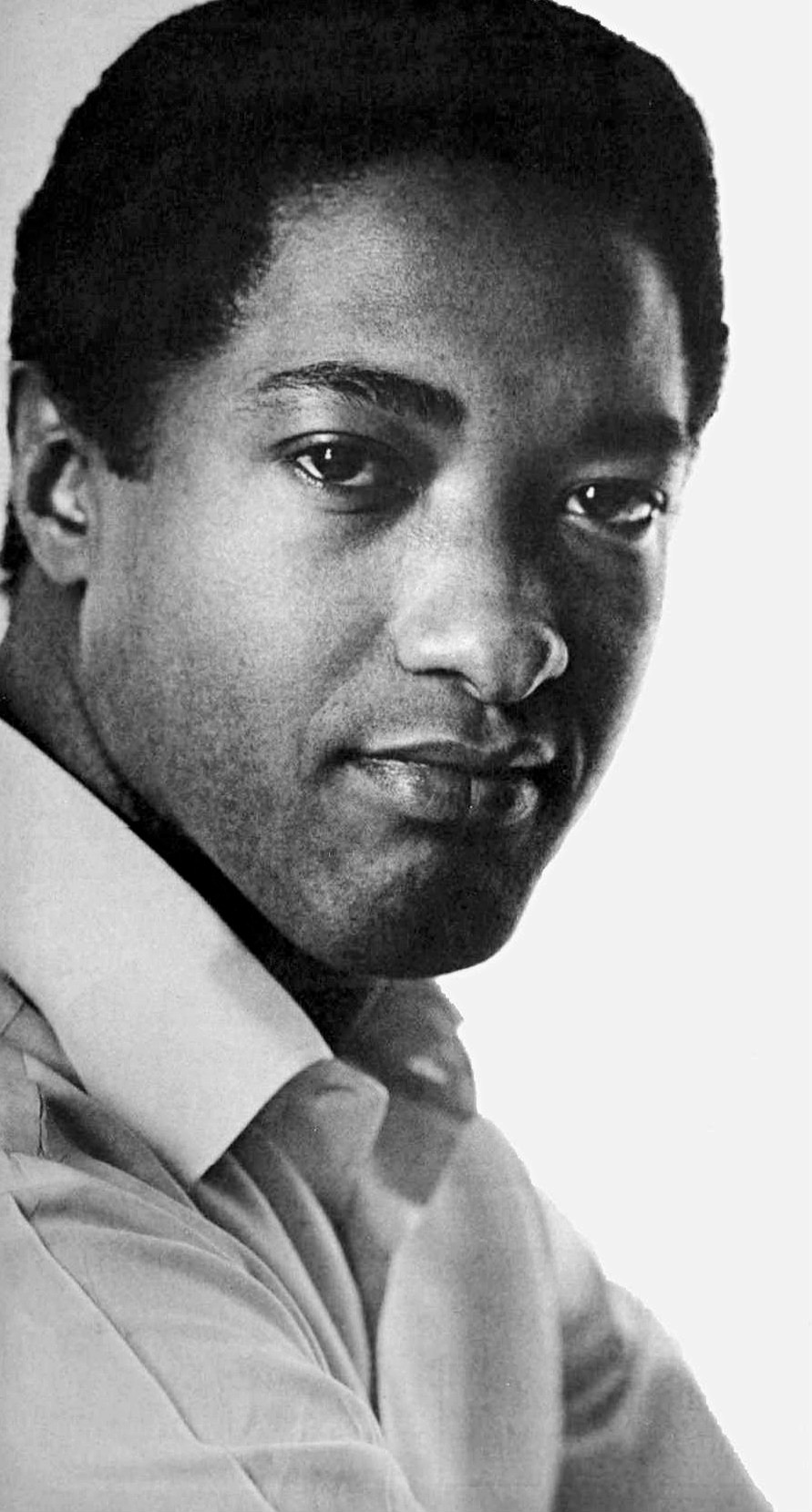
Sam Cooke

- January 15 – Jack Teagarden, jazz trombonist (born 1905)
- January 19 – Joe Weatherly, NASCAR championship driver (born 1922)
- January 27
  - Norman Z. McLeod, film director (born 1898)
  - Louis Allen, civil rights activist and businessman (born 1919)
  - Waite Phillips, petroleum businessman (born 1883)
- January 29 – Alan Ladd, actor (born 1913)
- January 31 – Louis Allen, logger and murder victim (born 1919)
- February 5 – Matilde Moisant, aviator (born 1878)
- February 15 – Robert L. Thornton, American businessman, philanthropist and mayor of Dallas, Texas (born 1880)
- February 16 – James M. Canty, educator, school administrator, and businessperson (born 1865)
- February 25
  - Johnny Burke, lyricist (born 1908)
  - Grace Metalious, writer (born 1924)
  - Kenneth Spencer, opera singer (born 1913)
- February 29 – Frank Albertson, actor (born 1909)
- March 1 – Kathryn Card, actress (born 1892)
- March 6 – Edward Van Sloan, actor (born 1882)
- March 22 – Addison Richards, actor (born 1887)
- March 23 – Peter Lorre, Hungarian and American actor (born 1904)
- April 4 – Georgia Caine, actress (born 1876)
- April 5 – Douglas MacArthur, military leader and General of the Army (born 1880)
- April 7 – Bruce W. Klunder, Presbyterian minister and civil rights activist (born 1937)
- April 9 – Jerry Gaetz, politician (born 1914)
- April 14 – Rachel Carson, marine biologist, writer, and conservationist (born 1907)
- April 18 – Ben Hecht, screenwriter, director, producer, playwright, journalist, and novelist (born 1894)
- April 20 – Eddie Dyer, baseball player and manager (born 1899)
- May 7 – Lee Fenner, American footballer (born 1897)
- May 10 – Carol Haney, dancer and actress (born 1924)
- May 17 – Steve Owen, American football coach (New York Giants) and a member of the Pro Football Hall of Fame (born 1898)
- May 20 – Rudy Lewis, rhythm and blues singer (born 1936)
- May 24 – Renee Godfrey, actress (born 1919)
- May 30
  - Dave MacDonald, racing driver (born 1936)
  - Eddie Sachs, racing driver (born 1927)
- June 6 – Robert Warwick, actor (born 1878)
- June 17
  - Clarence G. Badger, film director (born 1880)
  - Joel S. Goldsmith, spiritual healer and founder of "The Infinite Way" movement (born 1892)
- June 21
  - James Chaney, civil rights activist (born 1943; murdered by Ku Klux Klan)
  - Andrew Goodman, civil rights activist (born 1943; murdered by Ku Klux Klan)
  - Michael Schwerner, civil rights activist (born 1939; murdered by Ku Klux Klan)
- July 2 – Fireball Roberts, race car driver and member of the NASCAR Hall of Fame (born 1929)
- July 7 – Lillian Copeland, track and field athlete (born 1904)
- July 13 – Stephen Galatti, American Field Service director (born 1888)
- July 26 – William A. Seiter, film director (born 1890)
- July 27 – Harry Shannon, actor (born 1890)
- July 29 – Vean Gregg, baseball player (born 1885)
- July 31 – Jim Reeves, country singer-songwriter (born 1923)
- August 3 – Flannery O'Connor, novelist and short story writer (born 1925)
- August 6 – Cedric Hardwicke, English actor (born 1893)
- August 14 – Johnny Burnette, singer and songwriter (born 1934)
- August 27 – Gracie Allen, actress (born 1895)
- September 2
  - Glenn Albert Black, archaeologist (born 1900)
  - Alvin York, soldier (born 1887)
- September 6 – Jane Hadley Barkley, Second Lady of the United States as wife of Alben W. Barkley (born 1911)
- September 7 – Walter A. Brown, sports executive and owner (born 1905)
- September 9 – Herschel Bennett, baseball player of St. Louis Browns (born 1896)
- September 15 – Herbert Heywood, actor (born 1881)
- September 23 – Fred M. Wilcox, film director (born 1907)
- September 28
  - Nacio Herb Brown, songwriter (born 1896)
  - Harpo Marx, comedian (born 1888)
- October 10 – Eddie Cantor, entertainer (born 1892)
- October 15 – Cole Porter, composer and songwriter (born 1891)
- October 19 – Russ Brown, actor (born 1892)
- October 20 – Herbert Hoover, 31st president of the United States from 1929 to 1933 (born 1874)
- October 21 – Margaret Gibson, actress (born 1894)
- October 22 – Whip Wilson, actor (born 1911)
- October 27 – Sammee Tong, actor (born 1901)
- October 28 – Harold Hitz Burton, politician and jurist, Associate Justice of the Supreme Court of the United States (born 1888)
- October 31 – Theodore Freeman, trainee astronaut (born 1930)
- November 10
  - Jimmie Dodd, actor and television personality (born 1910)
  - Sam Newfield, movie director (born 1899)
- November 21 – Catherine Bauer Wurster, architect and public housing advocate (born 1905)
- November 24 – William O'Dwyer, diplomat and politician, 100th Mayor of New York City (born 1890)
- November 25 – Clarence Kolb, vaudeville performer and actor (born 1874)
- November 28 – Charles Meredith, actor (born 1894)
- December 3 – Charles P. Snyder, admiral (born 1879)
- December 11
  - Sam Cooke, singer-songwriter (born 1931)
  - Percy Kilbride, actor (born 1888)
  - Alma Mahler, widow and muse of Gustav Mahler, Walter Gropius and Franz Werfel (born 1879 in Vienna)
- December 14 – William Bendix, actor (born 1906)
- December 25 – Cheerio Meredith, actress (born 1890)
- December 28 – Cliff Sterrett, cartoonist (born 1883)
- December 31 – Gertrude Michael, actress (born 1911)

== See also ==
- 1964 (film)
- List of American films of 1964
- Timeline of United States history (1950–1969)
