= Joel S. Goldsmith =

American mystic, spiritual teacher, author and healer

- Born: Joel Solomon Goldsmith; March 10, 1892; New York City, United States
- Died: July 17, 1964 (aged 72); Piccadilly Hotel, Westminster, London, England
- Resting place: Sun City, Arizona, US
- Occupations: Spiritual author, teacher, spiritual healer, mystic
- Known for: Founding The Infinite Way
- Spouse: Emma Goldsmith
- Military career
- Allegiance: United States
- Branch: United States Marine Corps
- War: World War I
- Website: joelgoldsmith.com

Joel Solomon Goldsmith (March 10, 1892 – June 17, 1964) was an American spiritual teacher, author, spiritual healer and modern-day mystic. His teachings, in the form of dozens of books and more than 1,300 hours of recorded class instruction were known as The Message of The Infinite Way, which became the basis of a worldwide spiritual path, practice and community.

== Early years and career ==
Joel S. Goldsmith was born in New York City on March 10, 1892. His parents were non-practicing Jews, who were married in New York City in 1891. Joel was their first child. They had another son two years later, followed by a daughter two years thereafter.

In 1915, Joel's father became critically ill while in England and word was sent to the Goldsmith family to come for the body. However, according to Joel, his father was healed by a Christian Science practitioner in London. From his early adulthood, Joel Goldsmith had many spiritual experiences.

He was a healer who spent many years in spiritual studies, reading original scriptures of Aramaic, Greek and Sanskrit origins. His first book, The Infinite Way, was published in 1948.

After serving in the Marines during World War I, Goldsmith returned to work in the garment district of New York City, where he owned his own business. While on a return trip from Europe, he developed pneumonia. As was his father before him, Goldsmith was healed by a Christian Science practitioner who happened to be on board his ship at the time.

In 1928, strangers began approaching Goldsmith on the street, asking for prayer and healing. He had no religious training whatsoever, but these people allegedly were healed. To seek answers about this phenomenon, Goldsmith first entered the Christian Science Church and worked at Rikers Island prison as a First Reader. After 16 years, he left the Church and moved to Boston, where he set up his own office. He moved to California before World War II and maintained a successful healing practice there.

In 1948 Goldsmith wrote the book The Infinite Way, which came to the attention of Willing Publishers. The book's title also became the name associated with his spiritual message and work.

== Spiritual Awakening ==
Goldsmith stated that the “original unfoldment was given to me some time after 1909."^{:3} "[W]hen I was nineteen, whether it was the Voice or an impression, Something within me said, 'Find the man Jesus, and you will have the secret of life.' That was a strange thing to say to me because I knew nothing of Jesus Christ beyond the name and that Christmas was a holiday celebrating his birth."^{:9}

Goldsmith recounted, “Thus the search began: Where is God? What is God? How do we bring God into our experience? Eventually, late in 1928, the Experience took place, that first God-experience. [...] an experience that could not be described. Whereas in one moment I was like every other human being, in the next moment my body was well, and many undesirable human habits were gone. I found that a healing power was present and that I was on the threshold of a whole new life. The old life was dead; a new one had begun [...].^{:4}

Goldsmith described the Experience in greater detail elsewhere. “I was taken sick in the city of Detroit, went to a building that was filled with Christian Science practitioners, found the name of a practitioner on the board, went up to the man’s office, and asked him to help me. He told me that it was Saturday and that he didn’t take patients on Saturdays. That day he always spent in meditation and prayer."^{:16} Goldsmith convinced the practitioner to allow him to sit with him. “He talked to me about the Bible; he talked to me of truth. Long before the two hours were up, I was healed of that cold, and when I went out on the street I found I couldn’t smoke any more. When eating my dinner I found I couldn’t drink any more. The following week I found I couldn’t play cards any more, and I also found that I couldn’t go to the horse races any more. And the businessman had died.”^{:16} He noted that soon after, people began approaching him for healing.

== The Infinite Way ==
Goldsmith self-published his most famous work, The Infinite Way, in 1947, which was based on letters to patients and students. He also published The Spiritual Interpretation of Scripture.

The writings which followed were transcriptions of his lectures which had been recorded on the first wire recorders in the late 1940s. These were distributed by Goldsmith Publishing. They were: The Master Speaks, The First, Second, Third San Francisco Lecture Series, Consciousness Unfolding, God the Substance of All Form, and Metaphysical Notes. These original books were later republished during Goldsmith's lifetime by publishers in various countries, making over fifty books.

As Goldsmith was approached by large publishing houses around the world to produce books of his talks, he enlisted the help of Lorraine Sinkler and her sister Valborg to edit his books, which were generally compiled from various lecture transcripts.

Goldsmith's insistence on "no organization" insured that his message remained a personal journey with leaders naturally evolving from new generations. There is no service, ritual, dogma, or ceremony in the practice of the Infinite Way. Goldsmith students can be found in all walks of life, in all religions. His message is one that can be read and heard for a lifetime, always allowing new understandings to unfold in each individual.

Goldsmith stressed "contemplative meditation" practice in his teaching. The method he generally taught involved short frequent meditation periods throughout the day. He told his student of 18 years, Walter Starcke, that the main reason to meditate was that through reaching the inner silence one could hear the still small voice and receive its intuitive guidance. His teaching also stressed spiritual healing through conscious contact with God.

After completing the work, Goldsmith expected to retire to a life of contemplation. However, the work prompted people to seek him out as a spiritual teacher, leading to the extension of his career, teaching and writing.

== Death ==
Goldsmith died on June 17, 1964, at the Piccadilly Hotel, Westminster, London, UK. His body was cremated at Golders Green in London on June 18, 1964, and his ashes and effects were released to his widow, Emma Goldsmith, who took them back to their home in Hawaii. Both were interred in Sun City, Arizona.

== Bibliography ==
- Beyond Words and Thoughts
- Collected Essays of Joel S. Goldsmith
- Conscious Union With God
- Consciousness in Transition
- Consciousness is What I AM
- Consciousness Transformed
- Contemplative Life
- Gift of Love
- God, The Substance of All Form (1949 edition)
- Invisible Supply
- Leave your Nets (original)
- Living Between Two Worlds
- Living Now
- Living the Infinite Way
- Man Was Not Born to Cry
- Metaphysical Healing
- Our Spiritual Resources
- Parenthesis in Eternity
- Practicing the Presence
- Realization of Oneness
- The 1954 Letters
- The 1955 Letters
- The 1956 Letters
- The 1957 Letters
- The 1958 Letters
- The 1959 Letters
- The Art of Meditation
- The Art of Spiritual Healing
- The Infinite Way (1948)
- The Master Speaks (original)
- The Mystical "I"
- The Spiritual Interpretation of Scripture
- The Thunder of Silence
- The World is New
