= Richard A. Scott =

American comics artist (born 1964)

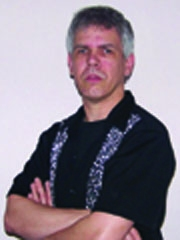
- Richard A. Scott (2008)
- Born: February 19, 1964 (age 62) Anchorage, Alaska
- Areas: Writer, Artist, videographer and Voice Talent
- Pseudonyms: Spunky (cheese); Chameleon King

Richard A. Scott (born February 19, 1964) is an American freelance comic book artist, writer, videographer and voice talent.

== Biography ==
Scott has done an article for issue #54 of The Jack Kirby Collector edited by John Morrow, about Fantastic Four the Lost Adventure. He has also covered Megan Rose Gedris for Curve.

He assisted his long-time friend Andy Mangels on Animation on DVD-the ultimate guide and his upcoming book for TwoMorrows Lou Scheimer: Creating The Filmation Generation.
