= LeRoy E. Cain =

American NASA aerospace engineer

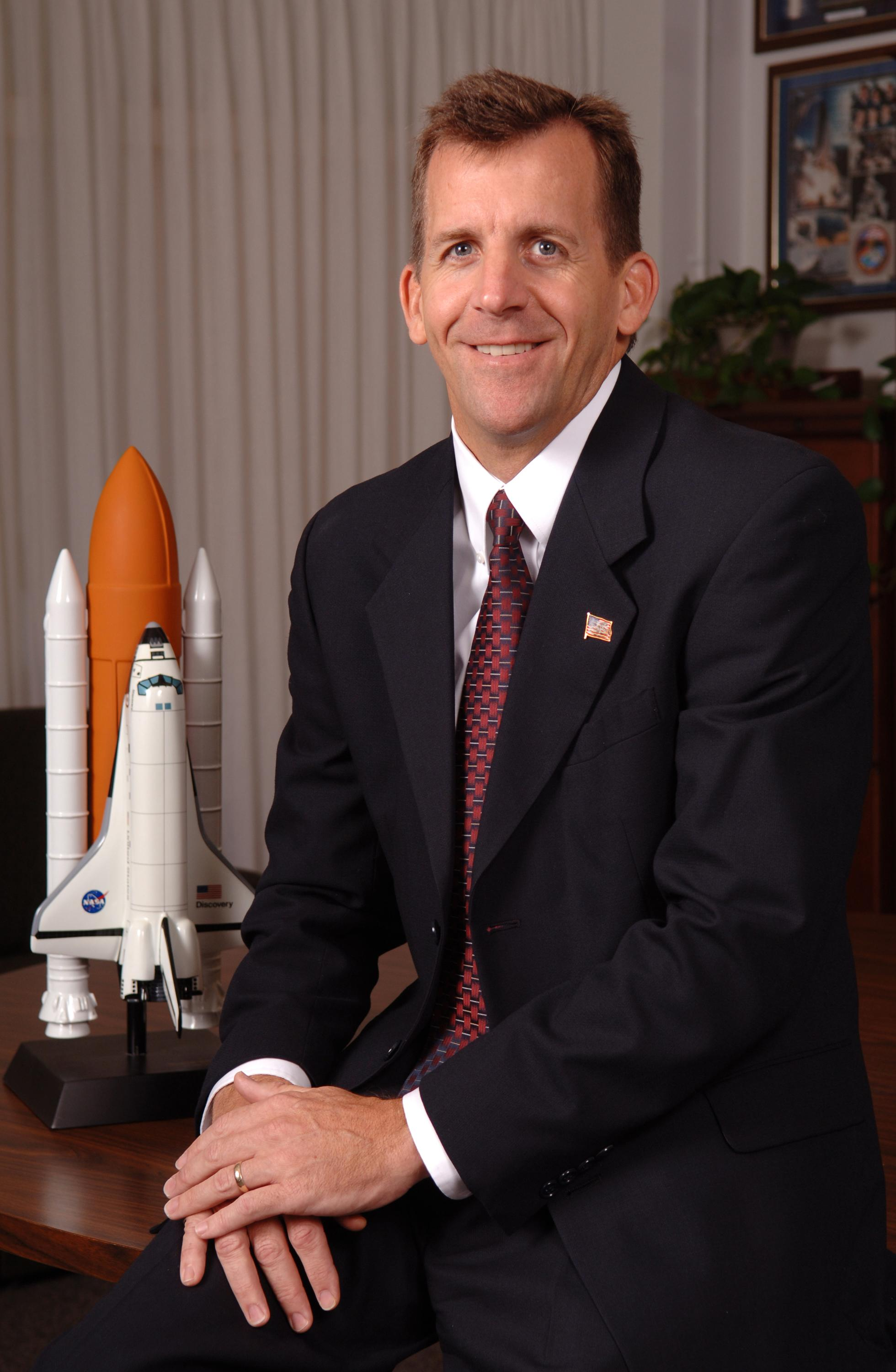
- Cain in 2006
- Born: February 4, 1964 (age 62); Dubuque, Iowa, U.S.
- Education: Iowa State University (BS)
- Employer: NASA
- Title: Chief of Staff to the Associate Administrator for Human Exploration and Operations Mission Directorate
- Children: 3 daughters

LeRoy Edward Cain (born February 4, 1964) is an American aerospace engineer who worked for NASA as a flight director, launch integration manager and deputy manager of the Space Shuttle Program. Cain may be best known to the public from footage and documentaries showing his work as the entry flight director for STS-107, the mission that ended in the catastrophic disintegration of Space Shuttle Columbia, February 1, 2003. Cain issued the famous "Lock the doors" command, initiating contingency procedures in mission control for the first time since the Space Shuttle Challenger disaster 17 years earlier.

== Early life and education ==
Born in Dubuque, Iowa, Cain earned a Bachelor of Science in Aerospace Engineering from Iowa State University in Ames, Iowa, in 1988.

== Career ==
=== NASA ===
As of September 2015, Cain was serving as the Chair of the Exploration Systems Development (ESD) Standing Review Board, reporting directly to the Associate Administrator for HEOMD at NASA Headquarters in Washington, D.C., as well as the entire Agency leadership staff. In this role, his responsibilities include, but are not limited to, staffing a team to assess all three major ESD programs (Space Launch Systems, Multi-Purpose Crew Vehicle/Orion, and Ground Systems Design Operations) and providing guidance for integrating these programs by ESD. He serves as the Chair for an integrated review team for all three major programs to establish review milestones and reports these findings to program, center, mission directorate, and Agency leadership, as well as outside entities to include the Office of Management and Budget, Office of Science and Technology Policy, and Congress, as necessary.

Cain served as the Deputy Manager, Space Shuttle Program (SSP), from March 2008 through the completion of the Program. In this position, Cain shared responsibility with the Program Manager for the overall management, integration, and operations of the SSP from NASA’s Johnson Space Center (JSC) in Houston, Texas. He also served as Chairman of the Mission Management Team for all Space Shuttle missions.

Previously, Cain held the position of Manager, Launch Integration, at Kennedy Space Center (KSC) in Florida, from November 2005 until July 2008. As head of the SSP at KSC, he was responsible for all program operations at KSC and all launch integration requirements for the Space Shuttle and International Space Station programs. In this role Cain also served as the Chairman of the MMT for Space Shuttle prelaunch and launch activities. In March 2011, Cain also began serving as the Deputy Chair for the NASA Mishap Investigation Board for the Taurus XL T9 Glory mishap investigation.

Prior to joining the SSP, Cain served as a NASA Flight Director in the Mission Operations Directorate. Selected in the Class of 1998, Cain supported numerous Space Shuttle missions in all phases of flight. He served as the Ascent Flight Director for six missions, and Entry Flight Director for eight missions, including the STS-114 Return-To-Flight mission in July 2005.

Cain began working in the space industry in 1988 as a Guidance and Control systems engineer at JSC. He was a flight controller in the Mission Control Center for the Space Shuttle Guidance and Control Systems. Cain held progressively more responsible technical, management, and leadership positions within Mission Operations from 1988 until 2005, when he entered the SSP Office.

== Personal life ==
Cain lives in Houston, Texas, with his wife. They have three daughters.

== Awards ==
Cain has received numerous honors and awards, including NASA's top honor, the Distinguished Service Medal, in 2015; the Presidential Rank Award in 2012, which is one of the highest honors awarded to a civil servant; having been nominated for the prestigious NASA Rotary Stellar Award for two consecutive years in 2010 and 2011, and won the award in 2011; he was a candidate for the SES Rank Award for 2011; he earned the NASA Outstanding Leadership Medals in 2005 and 2011; a NASA Outstanding Contribution award for the Ariane 502 Re-entry Observation Project in 1997; and a Certificate of Commendation from Johnson Space Center in 1996.

== Multimedia ==
NASA Johnson SFC STS-107 Day 16 Entry Status Briefing, January 31, 2003. Reporter question regarding acknowledged TPS tile damage at 6:13

STS-107 NASA mission control on February 1st, 2003. LeRoy E. Cain as Flight Director.

February 14, 2003 Post-Accident Entry Status Briefing, at Johnson SFC.
