= The Infinite Way =

Spiritual teaching & activity

The Infinite Way is a spiritual teaching and activity created by American healer, mystic and lecturer Joel S. Goldsmith (1892–1964). Goldsmith started teaching the lessons of the Infinite Way in 1940. He published the book The Infinite Way in 1947. He began teaching and lecturing extensively that year, first in New England, then on the West Coast of the United States and finally in Hawaii. In 1950, Goldsmith began recording his lectures globally. He authored more than fifty-one books on the subject.

According to Goldsmith, the Message of the Infinite Way is a spiritual teaching and set of specific practices, including meditation, centered around four principles: the Nature of God, the Nature of Individual Being, the Nature of Error, and the Nature of Prayer. He said that these principles can be practiced irrespective of religion. Goldsmith taught that the faithful and devoted study and practice of these principles, and of the form of meditation which he taught, would result in lifting ordinary humans into a state of higher consciousness called God realization.
