= 2004 in the United States =

- Decades: 1980s; 1990s; 2000s; 2010s; 2020s
- See also: History of the United States (1991–2016); Timeline of United States history (1990–2009); List of years in the United States

Events from the year 2004 in the United States.

== Incumbents ==
=== Federal government ===
- President: George W. Bush (R-Texas)
- Vice President: Dick Cheney (R-Wyoming)
- Chief Justice: William Rehnquist (Virginia)
- Speaker of the House of Representatives: Dennis Hastert (R-Illinois)
- Senate Majority Leader: Bill Frist (R-Tennessee)
- Congress: 108th

==== State governments ====
Governors and lieutenant governors

=== Governors ===
- Governor of Alabama: Bob Riley (Republican)
- Governor of Alaska: Frank Murkowski (Republican)
- Governor of Arizona: Janet Napolitano (Democratic)
- Governor of Arkansas: Mike Huckabee (Republican)
- Governor of California: Arnold Schwarzenegger (Republican)
- Governor of Colorado: Bill Owens (Republican)
- Governor of Connecticut: John Rowland (Republican) (starting July 1), Jodi Rell (Republican) (starting July 1)
- Governor of Delaware: Ruth Ann Minner (Democratic)
- Governor of Florida: Jeb Bush (Republican)
- Governor of Georgia: Sonny Perdue (Republican)
- Governor of Hawaii: Linda Lingle (Republican)
- Governor of Idaho: Dirk Kempthorne (Republican)
- Governor of Illinois: Rod Blagojevich (Democratic)
- Governor of Indiana: Joe Kernan (Democratic)
- Governor of Iowa: Tom Vilsack (Democratic)
- Governor of Kansas: Kathleen Sebelius (Democratic)
- Governor of Kentucky: Ernie Fletcher (Republican)
- Governor of Louisiana: Murphy J. Foster, Jr. (Republican) (until January 11), Kathleen Blanco (Democratic) (starting January 11)
- Governor of Maine: John Baldacci (Democratic)
- Governor of Maryland: Robert L. Ehrlich Jr. (Republican)
- Governor of Massachusetts: Mitt Romney (Republican)
- Governor of Michigan: Jennifer Granholm (Democratic)
- Governor of Minnesota: Tim Pawlenty (Republican)
- Governor of Mississippi: Haley Barbour (Republican)
- Governor of Missouri: Bob Holden (Democratic)
- Governor of Montana: Judy Martz (Republican)
- Governor of Nebraska: Mike Johanns (Republican)
- Governor of Nevada: Kenny Guinn (Republican)
- Governor of New Hampshire: Craig Benson (Republican)
- Governor of New Jersey: Richard Codey (Democratic)
- Governor of New Mexico: Bill Richardson (Democratic)
- Governor of New York: George Pataki (Republican)
- Governor of North Carolina: Mike Easley (Democratic)
- Governor of North Dakota: John Hoeven (Republican)
- Governor of Ohio: Bob Taft (Republican)
- Governor of Oklahoma: Brad Henry (Democratic)
- Governor of Oregon: Ted Kulongoski (Democratic)
- Governor of Pennsylvania: Ed Rendell (Democratic)
- Governor of Rhode Island: Donald Carcieri (Republican)
- Governor of South Carolina: Mark Sanford (Republican)
- Governor of South Dakota: Mike Rounds (Republican)
- Governor of Tennessee: Phil Bredesen (Democratic)
- Governor of Texas: Rick Perry (Republican)
- Governor of Utah: Olene S. Walker (Republican)
- Governor of Vermont: Jim Douglas (Republican)
- Governor of Virginia: Mark Warner (Democratic)
- Governor of Washington: Gary Locke (Democratic)
- Governor of West Virginia: Bob Wise (Democratic)
- Governor of Wyoming: Dave Freudenthal (Democratic)

=== Lieutenant governors ===
- Lieutenant Governor of Alabama: Lucy Baxley (Democratic)
- Lieutenant Governor of Alaska: Loren Leman (Republican)
- Lieutenant Governor of Arkansas: Winthrop Paul Rockefeller (Republican)
- Lieutenant Governor of California: Cruz Bustamante (Democratic)
- Lieutenant Governor of Colorado: Jane Norton (Republican)
- Lieutenant Governor of Connecticut: Jodi Rell (Republican) (starting July 1), Kevin B. Sullivan (Democratic) (starting July 1)
- Lieutenant Governor of Delaware: John Carney (Democratic)
- Lieutenant Governor of Florida: Toni Jennings (Republican)
- Lieutenant Governor of Georgia: Mark Taylor (Democratic)
- Lieutenant Governor of Hawaii: Duke Aiona (Republican)
- Lieutenant Governor of Idaho: Jim Risch (Republican)
- Lieutenant Governor of Illinois: Pat Quinn (Democratic)
- Lieutenant Governor of Indiana: Kathy Davis (Democratic)
- Lieutenant Governor of Iowa: Sally Pederson (Democratic)
- Lieutenant Governor of Kansas: John E. Moore (Democratic)
- Lieutenant Governor of Kentucky: Steve Pence (Republican)
- Lieutenant Governor of Louisiana: Kathleen Blanco (Democratic) (starting January 11), Mitch Landrieu (Democratic) (starting January 11)
- Lieutenant Governor of Maryland: Michael Steele (Republican)
- Lieutenant Governor of Massachusetts: Kerry Healey (Republican)
- Lieutenant Governor of Michigan: John D. Cherry (Democratic)
- Lieutenant Governor of Minnesota: Carol Molnau (Republican)
- Lieutenant Governor of Mississippi: Amy Tuck (Republican)
- Lieutenant Governor of Missouri: Joe Maxwell (Democratic)
- Lieutenant Governor of Montana: Karl Ohs (Republican)
- Lieutenant Governor of Nebraska: Dave Heineman (Republican)
- Lieutenant Governor of Nevada: Lorraine Hunt (Republican)
- Lieutenant Governor of New Mexico: Diane Denish (Democratic)
- Lieutenant Governor of New York: Mary Donohue (Republican)
- Lieutenant Governor of North Carolina: Bev Perdue (Democratic)
- Lieutenant Governor of North Dakota: Jack Dalrymple (Republican)
- Lieutenant Governor of Ohio: Jennette Bradley (Republican)
- Lieutenant Governor of Oklahoma: Mary Fallin (Republican)
- Lieutenant Governor of Pennsylvania: Catherine Baker Knoll (Democratic)
- Lieutenant Governor of Rhode Island: Charles J. Fogarty (Democratic)
- Lieutenant Governor of South Carolina: André Bauer (Republican)
- Lieutenant Governor of South Dakota: Dennis Daugaard (Republican)
- Lieutenant Governor of Tennessee: John S. Wilder (Democratic)
- Lieutenant Governor of Texas: David Dewhurst (Republican)
- Lieutenant Governor of Utah: Gayle McKeachnie (Republican)
- Lieutenant Governor of Vermont: Brian Dubie (Republican)
- Lieutenant Governor of Virginia: Tim Kaine (Democratic)
- Lieutenant Governor of Washington: Brad Owen (Democratic)
- Lieutenant Governor of Wisconsin: Barbara Lawton (Democratic)

== Events ==
=== January ===
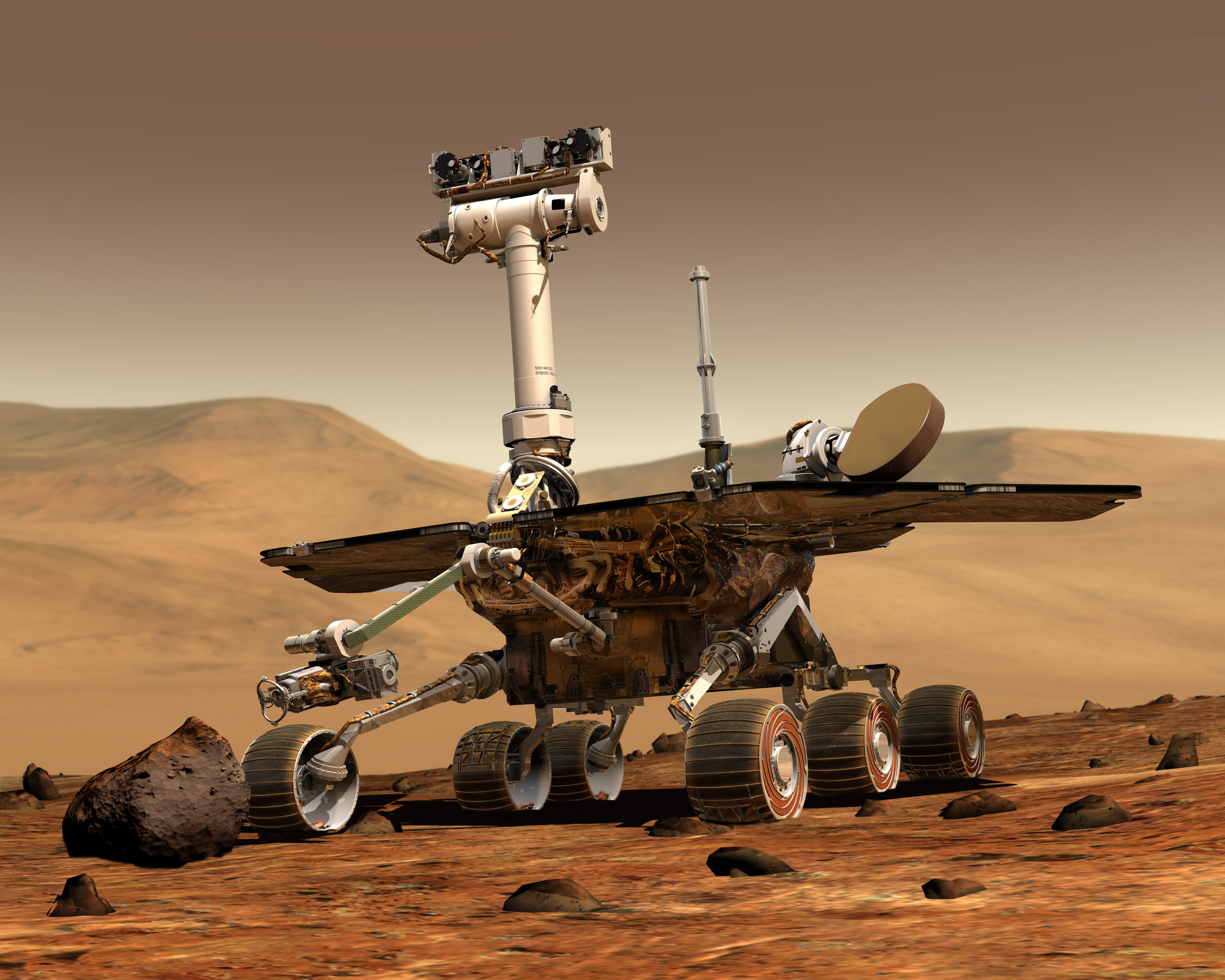
January 4 and January 24: Spirit and Opportunity land on Mars

- January 4 – NASA's MER-A (Spirit) lands on Mars at 04:35 UTC.
- January 11
  - The Philadelphia Eagles defeat the Green Bay Packers in the Divisional Round of the 2003–04 NFL playoffs at Lincoln Financial Field in Philadelphia, Pennsylvania, known as "4th and 26".
  - Drake & Josh premieres on Nickelodeon.
- January 19
  - U.S. Senator John Kerry (D-MA) wins the Iowa Democratic caucus. Former Vermont Governor Howard Dean's concession speech ends with a lively but controversial scream.
  - British children's television series Boohbah (made by Ragdoll Productions who also made Teletubbies) begins its first ever television premiere in the U.S. on PBS KIDS.
- January 20 – State of the Union Address.
- January 24 – NASA's MER-B (Opportunity) lands on Mars at 05:05 UTC.
- January 25 – World Wrestling Entertainment holds its Royal Rumble pay-per-view event from the Wachovia Center in Philadelphia, Pennsylvania.
- January 28 – At a hearing of the 9/11 Commission, it is revealed that, in the September 11 attacks, terrorists used Mace, a brand of tear gas or pepper spray, in overpowering the flight crew of American Airlines Flight 11.

=== February ===
- February 1 – The New England Patriots win Super Bowl XXXVIII by defeating the Carolina Panthers 32–29 at Reliant Stadium in Houston. The halftime show becomes one of the most controversial events in television history, as Janet Jackson's breast is exposed to an audience of 143.6 million viewers.
- February 3 – The CIA admits that there was no imminent threat from weapons of mass destruction before the 2003 invasion of Iraq.
- February 4 – Mark Zuckerberg launches "TheFacebook", later renamed to Facebook, a social networking website for Harvard University students.
- February 9 – Disappearance of Maura Murray: A 21-year-old nursing student disappears this evening after a car crash on Route 112 near Woodsville, New Hampshire, in Haverhill. Her whereabouts remain unknown.
- February 12 – Same sex marriage in the United States: The City and County of San Francisco begins issuing marriage licenses to same-sex couples as an act of civil disobedience.
- February 14 – Jetix is introduced on Toon Disney and ABC Family, making it the first trade-name to be introduced as an anime-based block.
- February 15 – World Wrestling Entertainment holds its No Way Out pay-per-view event from the Cow Palace in Daly City, California.
- February 26 – The United States lifts a ban on travel to Libya, ending travel restrictions to the nation that had lasted for 23 years.
- February 29 – The 76th Academy Awards, hosted by Billy Crystal, are held at the Kodak Theatre in Hollywood, California, with Peter Jackson's The Lord of the Rings: The Return of the King winning a record-tying 11 Oscars (tied with 1959's Ben-Hur and 1997's Titanic), including Best Picture and Best Director. The film also breaks the record tied by 1958's Gigi and 1987's The Last Emperor for the largest sweep for a single film in Oscar history. The telecast garners nearly 43.6 million viewers, making it the most-watched broadcast since 2000.

=== March ===
- March 2
  - NASA announces that the Mars rover MER-B (Opportunity) has confirmed that its landing area was once drenched in water.
  - John Kerry effectively clinches the 2004 Democratic Party presidential nomination by winning nine out of 10 "Super Tuesday" primaries and caucuses.
- March 12 – Marcus Wesson is arrested in Fresno, California, after killing nine family members. Wesson had built a cult around his family and had molested and "married" several of his daughters. He was sentenced to death in 2005.
- March 14 – World Wrestling Entertainment holds WrestleMania XX at Madison Square Garden in New York City, New York.
- March 31 – Four American private military contractors working for Blackwater USA are killed and their bodies mutilated after being ambushed in Fallujah, Iraq.

=== April ===
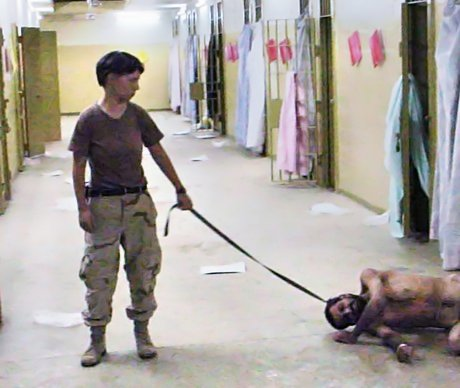
April 28: Abu Ghraib prisoner abuse revealed

- April 2 – Walt Disney Pictures' 45th feature film, Home on the Range, is released to mixed reviews and middling box office numbers. It is the studio's last traditionally-animated film until 2009's The Princess and the Frog (not counting the animation in the 2007 movie Enchanted).
- April 22 – Pat Tillman, a former NFL player who enlisted in the US Army, is killed by friendly fire in eastern Afghanistan. The U.S. military does not reveal this to the public until weeks later, after initially saying he was killed by enemy combatants.
- April 28 – Abu Ghraib prisoner abuse is revealed on the television show 60 Minutes II.
- April 29 – The last Oldsmobile rolls off of the assembly line.

=== May ===
- May – Emergence of cicada Brood X (Brood 10) begins in the eastern United States.
- May 4 – A WNBC helicopter crashes in the Flatbush neighborhood of Brooklyn, New York. This event is covered by rival station WABC-TV.
- May 6 – The final episode of Friends airs on NBC, drawing an estimated 66 million viewers in North America. Advertisers pay $2 million for 30 second ads.
- May 8 – Would-be "Saudi Princess" Antoinette Millard surfaces in New York City, claiming that muggers had stolen jewels worth of $262,000 from her (she later proves to be an impostor).
- May 12 – An American civilian contractor in Iraq, Nick Berg, is shown being decapitated by a group allegedly linked to al-Qaeda on an Internet-distributed video. They state it is retaliation for the abuse at Abu Ghraib prison.
- May 13 – The final episode of Frasier airs on NBC. The episode was viewed by 33.7 million people, being the 11th most-watched series finale and the 7th most watched from NBC.
- May 14 – Lynn Turner is convicted of the 1995 murder of her husband Glenn Turner by poisoning him with anti-freeze. She is also accused of the murder of her second husband, Randy Thompson.
- May 16 – World Wrestling Entertainment holds its Judgment Day pay-per-view event from the Staples Center in Los Angeles, California.
- May 17 – Massachusetts legalizes same-sex marriage in compliance with a ruling from the state's Supreme Court ruling in the case of Goodridge v. Department of Public Health.
- May 22 – A large, long-tracked, and powerful F4 tore through Nebraska, it was, at the time, the largest tornado ever recorded, it killed 1 and injured 38
- May 26
  - Fantasia Barrino wins season 3 of American Idol.
  - Terry Nichols is convicted by an Oklahoma state court on murder charges stemming from the 1995 Oklahoma City bombing.
- May 29 – Dedication of the National World War II Memorial takes place in Washington, D.C.

=== June ===
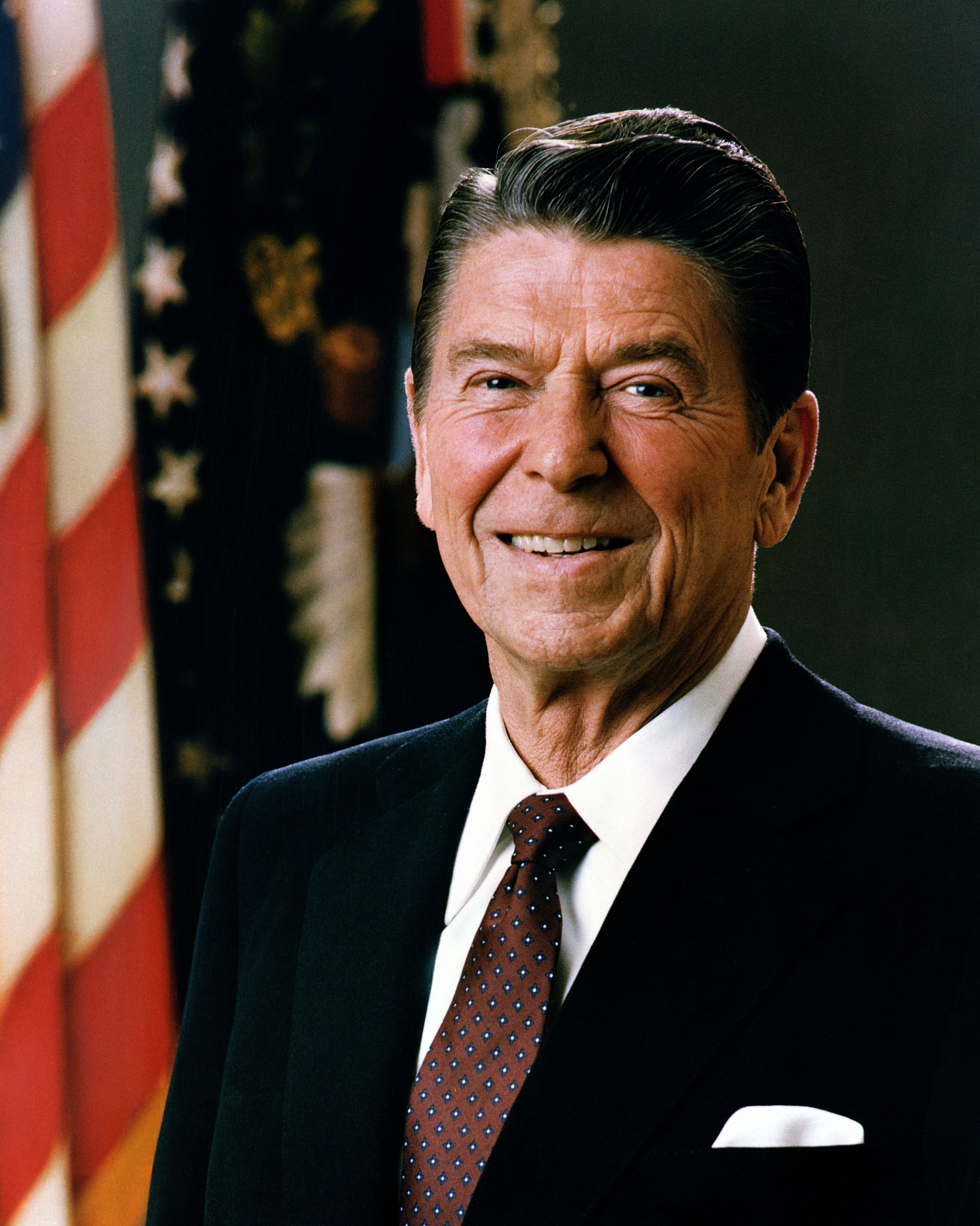
June 5: Former president Ronald Reagan dies at 93. A six day state funeral follows.

- June 3 – Director of Central Intelligence George Tenet tenders his resignation, citing "personal reasons". John E. McLaughlin, CIA Deputy Director, becomes the acting director until a permanent director is chosen and confirmed by Congress.
- June 4 – Marvin Heemeyer destroys many local buildings and vehicles with a modified bulldozer in Granby, Colorado. He takes away his life after the rampage.
- June 5 – Ronald Reagan, the 40th president of the United States, dies at his home in Bel-Air, California, at the age of 93. A six-day state funeral follows after his death.
- June 8–9 – The G8 Summit takes place on Sea Island, in Georgia, United States.
- June 11
  - The national funeral service for Ronald Reagan is held at the National Cathedral in Washington, D.C.
  - Terry Nichols is spared the death penalty by an Oklahoma state court on murder charges stemming from the 1995 Oklahoma City bombing, exactly three years after his co-defendant, Timothy McVeigh, was executed for his role in the bombing.
- June 13 – World Wrestling Entertainment holds its Bad Blood pay-per-view event from the Nationwide Arena in Columbus, Ohio.
- June 15 – The Detroit Pistons defeat the Los Angeles Lakers in the 2004 NBA Finals in five games to win their third NBA championship.
- June 16 – The 9/11 Commission issues an initial report of its findings.
- June 21 – In Mojave, California, SpaceShipOne becomes the first privately funded spaceplane to achieve spaceflight.
- June 27 – World Wrestling Entertainment holds its The Great American Bash pay-per-view event from the Norfolk Scope in Norfolk, Virginia.
- June 28
  - The U.S.-led coalition occupying Iraq transfers sovereignty to an interim Iraqi government.
  - Union Pacific and Burlington Northern Santa Fe trains collide in a rural area outside of San Antonio, Texas; 40 cars are derailed, including one chlorine car. Three people die, another 50 people are hospitalized because of exposure to the gas.
- June 30 – Spider-Man 2 is released in theaters.

=== July ===
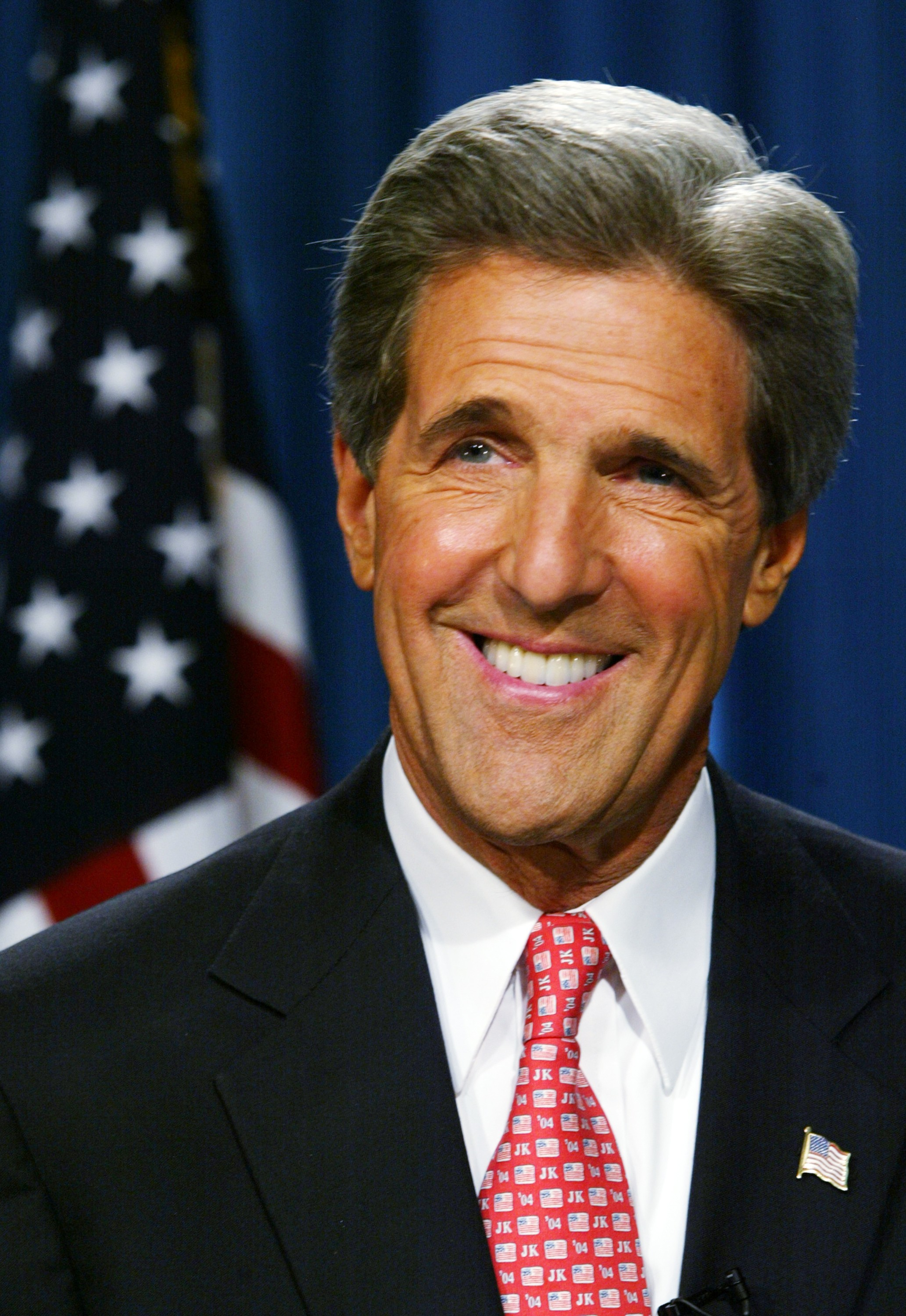
July 29: John Kerry, Democratic presidential nominee

- July 4 – A symbolic cornerstone is laid for the re-construction of One World Trade Center in New York City.
- July 11 – World Wrestling Entertainment holds its Vengeance pay-per-view event from the Hartford Civic Center in Hartford, Connecticut.
- July 25 – Lance Armstrong wins a record 6th consecutive Tour de France cycling title.
- July 26–29 – The Democratic National Convention in Boston, Massachusetts, nominates John Kerry for U.S. president and John Edwards for vice president. Future President Barack Obama delivers the keynote address.
- July 31 – "The Last Dispatch" concert is played as a reunion concert with the band Dispatch on the Hatch Shell in Boston; 110,000 people attend, making it the single largest gathering in independent music industry history.

=== August ===
- August 3
  - The Statue of Liberty reopens after security improvements.
  - NASA's MESSENGER is launched (it was captured into Mercury's orbit on March 18, 2011).
- August 12 – New Jersey Governor James McGreevey announces that he is "a gay American" and will resign effective November 15, 2004.
- August 13 – Hurricane Charley kills 27 people in Florida, after killing four in Cuba and one in Jamaica. Charley makes landfall near Cayo Costa, Florida as a Category 4 hurricane. Charley is the most intense hurricane to strike the United States since Hurricane Andrew in 1992.
- August 13–29 – The United States compete at the Summer Olympics in Athens, Greece, and win 36 gold, 39 silver, and 27 bronze medals.
- August 19 – Google becomes a publicly traded company via initial public offering.
- August 29 – Around 200,000 protesters demonstrate in New York City against President George W. Bush and his government, ahead of the Republican National Convention.
- August 30–September 2 – U.S. President George W. Bush and Vice President Dick Cheney are re-nominated at the Republican National Convention in New York City.
- August – Shadowville Productions business is founded in Brooklyn, New York.

=== September ===
- September 3 – Hurricane Frances makes landfall in Florida. After killing two people in the Bahamas, Hurricane Frances kills 10 people in Florida, two in Georgia and one in South Carolina.
- September 4 – Thomas & Friends comes to PBS KIDS as a stand-alone program with Michael Brandon taking over as the narrator.
- September 8 – In the "Rathergate" affair, the first Internet posts appear pointing out that documents claimed by CBS News to be typewritten memos from the early 1970s appear instead to have been produced using modern word processing systems.
- September 12 – World Wrestling Entertainment holds its Unforgiven pay-per-view event from the Rose Garden in Portland, Oregon.
- September 13 – The U.S. Federal Assault Weapons Ban expires.
- September 16 – Hurricane Ivan strikes Gulf Shores, Alabama, as a Category 3 storm, killing 25 in Alabama and Florida, becoming the third-costliest hurricane in American history at the time.
- September 23
  - Tropical Storm Ivan, having come around and re-formed in the Gulf of Mexico, makes its final landfall near Cameron, Louisiana, to little effect. In total, the storm kills 92 people.
  - Mount St. Helens becomes active again.
- September 24 – Major League Baseball announces that the Montreal Expos will move to Washington, D.C., in 2005.
- September 25 – Hurricane Jeanne makes landfall near Port Saint Lucie, Florida, near the location Hurricane Frances hit two weeks earlier. Jeanne kills over 3,030, mostly in Haiti.
- September 28 – A redesigned $50 bill is released, containing many of the same security features as its recently released $20 counterpart.
- September 29 – In Mojave, California, the first Ansari X-Prize flight takes place of SpaceShipOne, which is competing with a number of spacecraft (including Canada's Da Vinci Project, claimed to be its closest rival) and goes on to win the prize on October 4.
- September 30 – First debate of the 2004 United States presidential election.

=== October ===
- October 3 – World Wrestling Entertainment holds its No Mercy pay-per-view event from the Continental Airlines Arena in East Rutherford, New Jersey.
- October 5 – Vice presidential debate between candidates Dick Cheney and John Edwards.
- October 8 – Second presidential debate.
- October 11 – PBS Kids debuts a programming block targeted at children aged 6–10 entitled PBS Kids Go!, with new shows Maya & Miguel and an Arthur spinoff, Postcards from Buster, debuting on this day with Cyberchase and Arthur moving to PBS Kids Go! from PBS Kids.
- October 13 – Third presidential debate.
- October 16 – The New York Yankees defeat the Boston Red Sox by a score of 19–8 in Game 3 of Major League Baseball's American League Championship Series. The game, which pushes the Yankees to a 3–0 series lead, sets a record for longest nine-inning major league game. The Red Sox, however, rally to win the series in seven games.
- October 18 – Jimmy Wales and Angela Beesley Starling founds Fandom, Inc.
- October 19 – World Wrestling Entertainment holds its Taboo Tuesday pay-per-view event from the Bradley Center in Milwaukee, Wisconsin.
- October 20
  - Corporate Airlines Flight 5966 crashes in Missouri, killing 13 people and injuring two.
  - The Boston Red Sox defeat the New York Yankees in Game 7 of the ALCS to advance to the World Series after being down 3–0 in the series.
- October 25 – Martin Luther King Jr. and Coretta Scott King receive the Congressional Gold Medal.
- October 27 – The Boston Red Sox defeat the St. Louis Cardinals in four games to win the World Series for the first time since 1918, breaking the Curse of the Bambino.
- October 29 – A videotape of Osama bin Laden speaking airs on Arabic television, in which he threatens terrorist attacks on the United States and taunts President George W. Bush over the September 11 terrorist attacks.

=== November ===
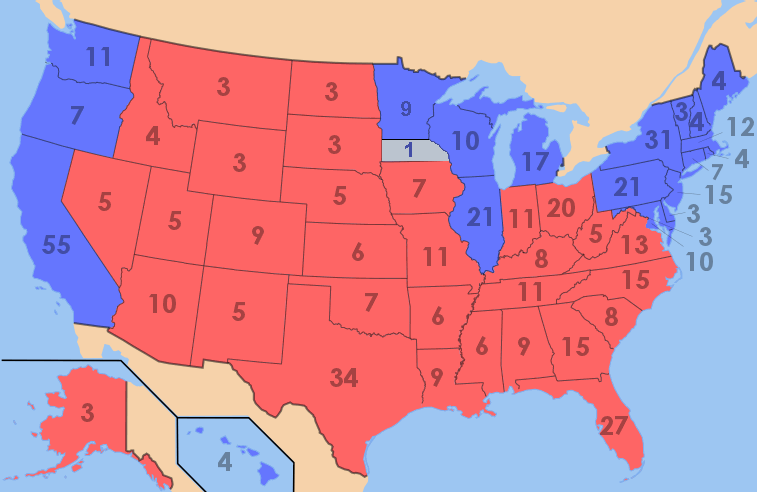
November 2: George W. Bush re-elected president

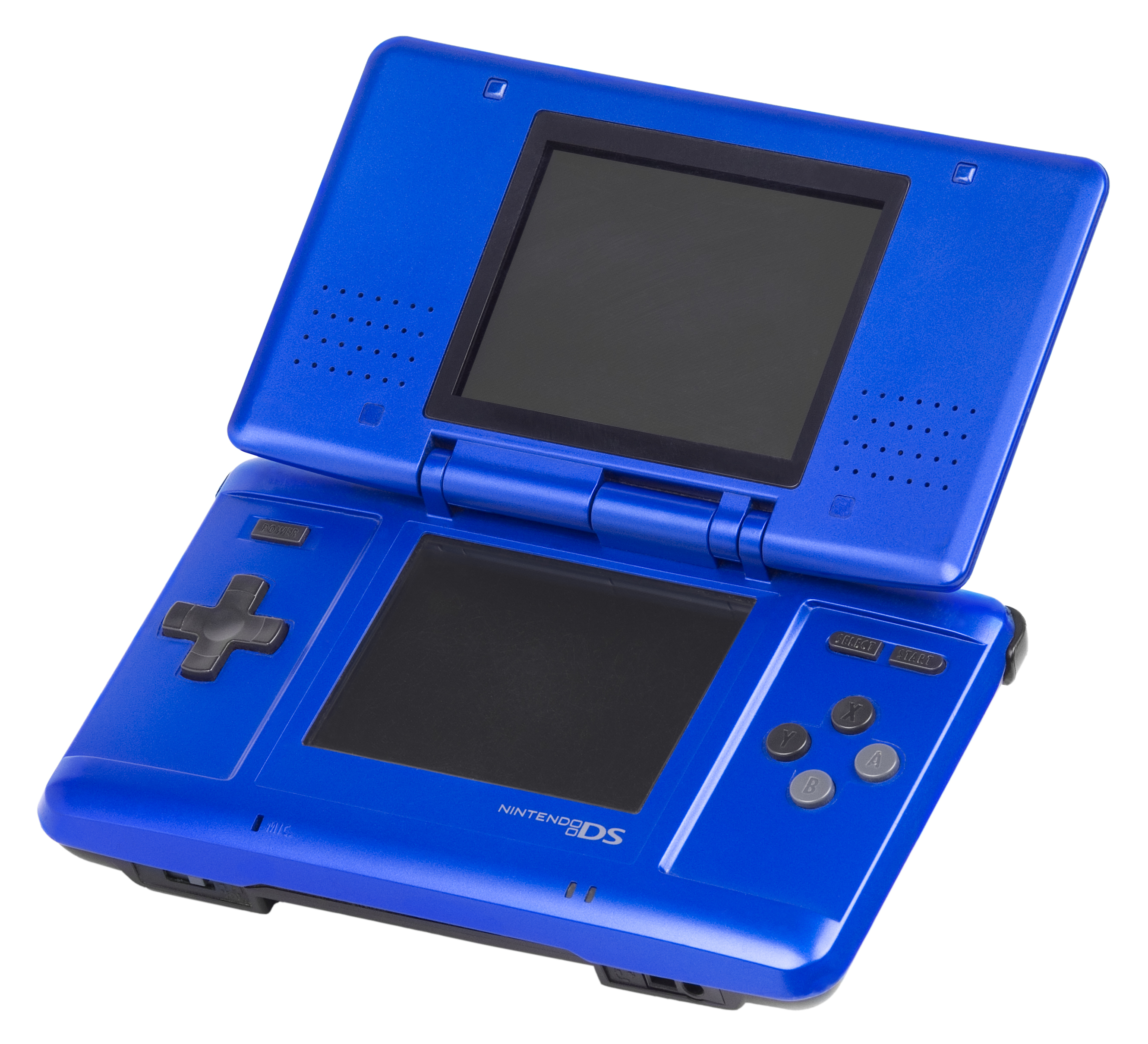
November 21: The release of the Nintendo DS in the US

- November 2
  - The 2004 United States presidential election is held. The United States re-elects George W. Bush of the Republican Party to a second term as President of the United States, defeating John Kerry.
  - 11 American states ban gay marriage.
- November 5 – Pixar Animation Studios' sixth feature film, The Incredibles, is released in theaters.
- November 7 – Second Battle of Fallujah: U.S. Forces launch a major assault on the Iraqi town of Fallujah, in an effort to rid the area of insurgents before the Iraqi elections in January.
- November 14
  - World Wrestling Entertainment holds its Survivor Series pay-per-view event from the Gund Arena in Cleveland, Ohio.
  - United States Secretary of State Colin Powell submits his resignation. He is replaced by Condoleezza Rice after her confirmation by the United States Congress.
- November 16 – NASA's hypersonic Scramjet breaks a record by reaching a velocity of about 7,000 mph in an unmanned experimental flight. It obtains a speed of Mach 9.6, almost 10 times the speed of sound.
- November 19
  - Nickelodeon's The SpongeBob SquarePants Movie, based on the cartoon of the same name is released, earning $9,559,752 on its opening day, and then $85,417,988 on the weekend alone only behind National Treasure.
  - The NBA's Indiana Pacers and Detroit Pistons engage in a brawl that involves fans and players after the game is called with 45.9 seconds left in the game. The incident gets (then) Pacer Ron Artest suspended for the remainder of the season.
- November 21
  - The Nintendo DS is released in the United States.
- November 30
  - John Green and Charlie Haddad, who were involved in the Pacers-Pistons brawl on November 19, are banned from attending Pistons home games for life.
  - Ken Jennings loses to Nancy Zerg, ending his 74-game winning streak on Jeopardy!.

=== December ===
- December 2 – Brian Williams replaces Tom Brokaw as weeknight anchor for NBC Nightly News.
- December 3 – The Colombian government extradites Gilberto Rodríguez Orejuela, one of the most powerful drug dealers in the world, arrested in 1995 and 2003, to the United States.
- December 6 – Terrorists attack the U.S. Consulate in Jeddah, Saudi Arabia, killing several people.
- December 8
  - The biggest Chinese PC producer Lenovo announces its plan to purchase IBM's global PC business, making it the world's third largest PC producer after Dell and Hewlett-Packard.
  - Former Pantera guitarist "Dimebag" Darrell Abbott is murdered on stage by gunman Nathan Gale in Columbus, Ohio. Gale kills three others before being shot dead by police.
- December 12 – World Wrestling Entertainment holds its Armageddon pay-per-view event from the Gwinnett Center in Duluth, Georgia.
- December 16 – Twenty-three-year-old pregnant woman Bobbie Jo Stinnett is found murdered in her home in Skidmore, Missouri. Her unborn baby has been cut out of her womb and is missing.
- December 21 – Iraqi insurgents attack a U.S. military base in the city of Mosul, killing 22 people.
- December 23 – Second Battle of Fallujah: US-UK-Iraqi forces defeat the remaining Iraqi insurgents in Fallujah.
- December 26
  - Thirty-five Americans are among the victims of the 2004 Indian Ocean tsunami in across the region of South and Southeast Asia. There were fatalities in 14 countries, including India, Sri Lanka, and Thailand.
  - U.S. President George W. Bush issues a statement expressing his condolences to those who lost loved ones during the tsunami.
- December 29 – U.S. President George W. Bush speaks out publicly about the deaths caused by the 9.1 magnitude earthquake and tsunami in Indian Ocean and answers questions at the Prairie Chapel Ranch.
- December 31
  - U.S. President George W. Bush announces his committing of $350 million to support relief efforts for the "disaster around the Indian Ocean".
  - Simón Trinidad, high-profile FARC leader, is extradited to the United States.

=== Ongoing ===
- War in Afghanistan (2001–2021)
- Iraq War (2003–2011)

=== Undated ===
- "55% of adult internet users have broadband at home or work."

== Births ==
=== January ===
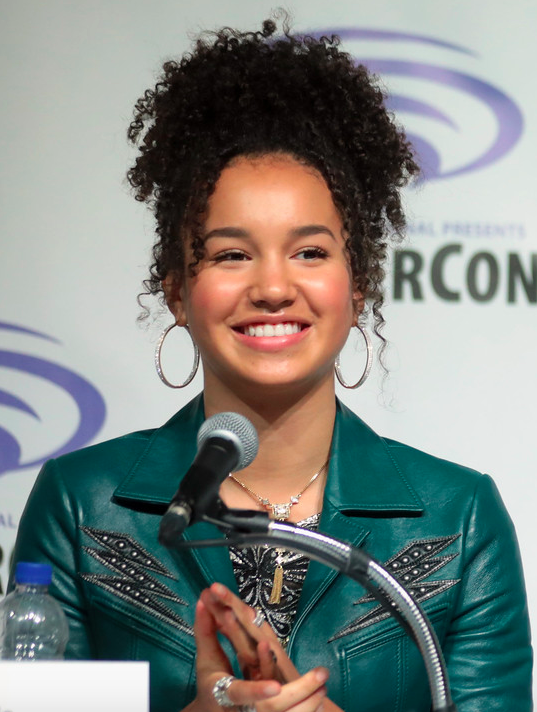
Sofia Wylie

- January 7
  - Cody Baker, soccer player
  - Sofia Wylie, actress and dancer
- January 10
  - Kaitlyn Maher, singer and actress
  - Bryce Wettstein, skateboarder
- January 13 – Jack Brunault, actor
- January 14 – Paul Ji, pianist
- January 15
  - Grace VanderWaal, singer and songwriter
- January 17 – Serah Williams, basketball player
- January 22
  - Tyler Armstrong, mountain climber
  - Leo Torres, soccer player
- January 25 – Rohan Chand, actor
- January 26
  - Evy Leibfarth, slalom canoeist
  - Robby Novak, media personality
- January 27 – Rohan Chand, actor
- January 28
  - Emoni Bates, basketball player
  - Dior Johnson, basketball player

=== February ===
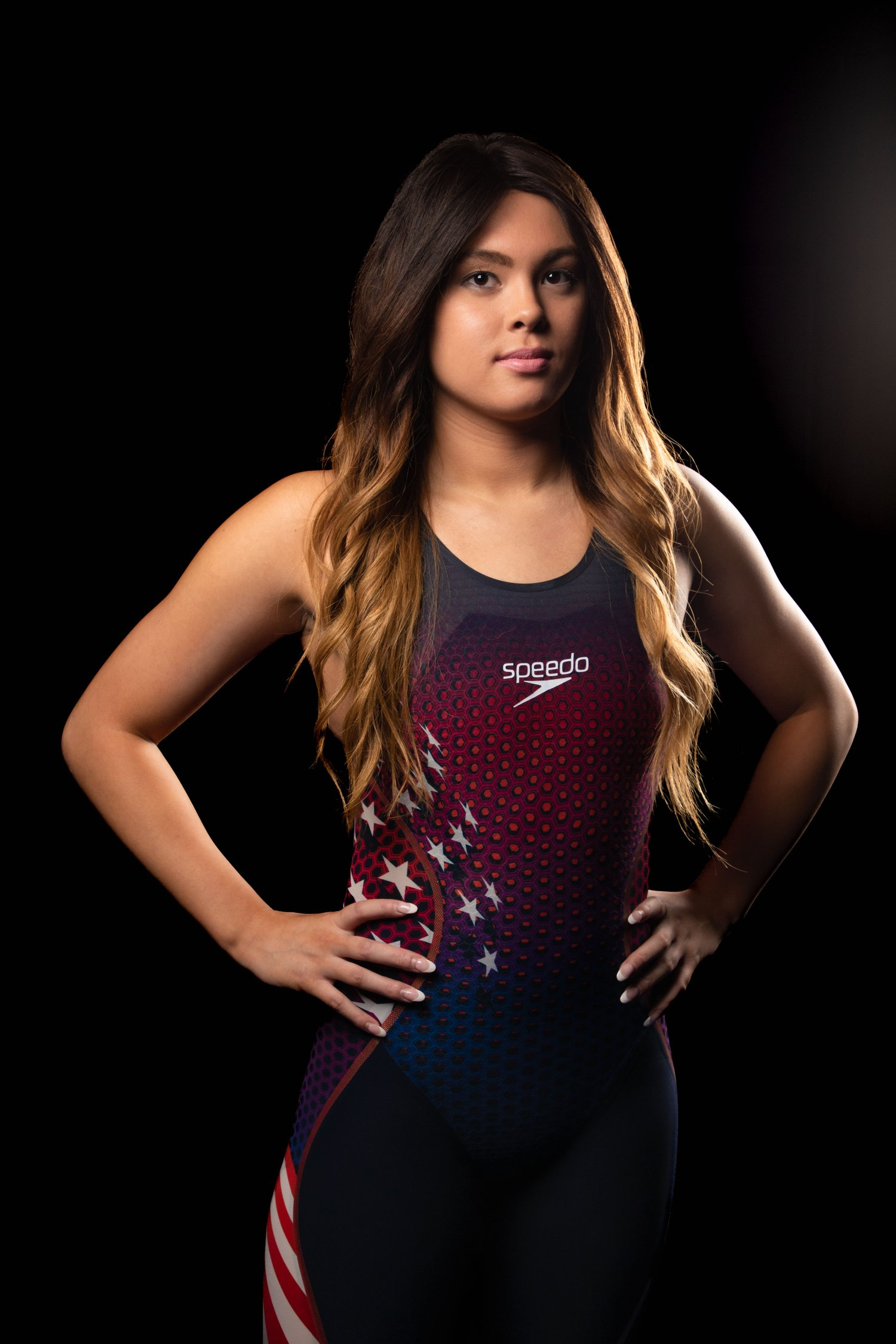
Gia Pergolini

- February 1 – Ashley Gerasimovich, actress
- February 3 – Gia Pergolini, Paralympic swimmer
- February 8 – Max Andrews, soccer player
- February 10 – CJ Fodrey, soccer player
- February 12 – Lauren Lee, taekwondo practitioner
- February 13 – Yekeson Subah, soccer player
- February 14 – Austin Brummett, soccer player
- February 17 – Amari Bailey, basketball player
- February 18 – Kylie Rogers, actress
- February 25 – Britton Fischer, soccer player
- February 26 – The Hanselman sextuplets, notable multiple birth
- February 27 – Owen Walz, soccer player
- February 29 – Lydia Jacoby, swimmer

=== March ===
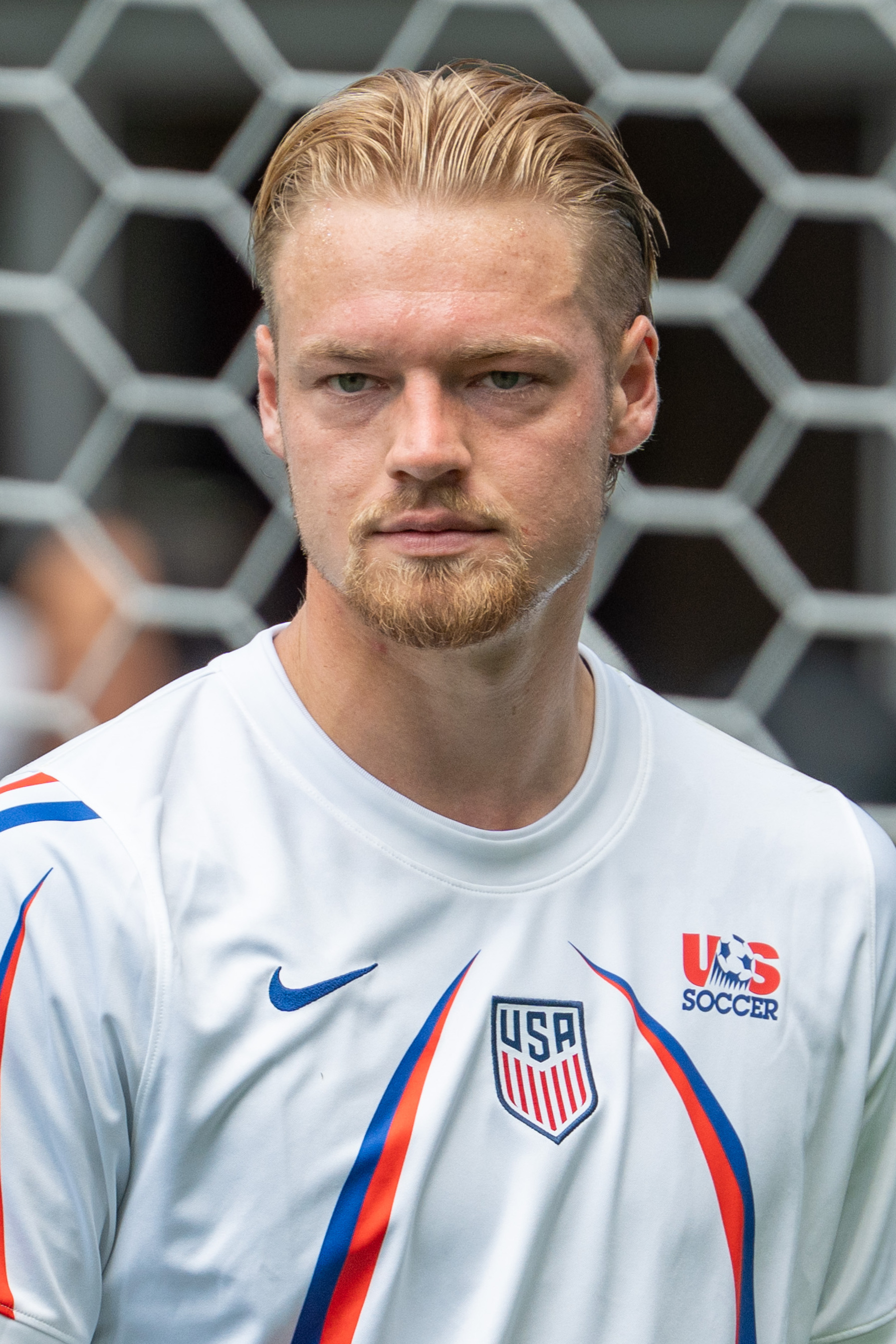
Chris Brady

Forrest Wheeler

- March 1 – Izabella Alvarez, actress
- March 3 – Chris Brady, soccer player
- March 4 – Efrain Morales, soccer player
- March 7 – Ciena Alipio, gymnast
- March 8 – Wyatt Borso, soccer player
- March 9
  - John Cortez, soccer player
- March 12 – Audrey Shin, figure skater
- March 13
  - Ozzie Cisneros, soccer player
  - Coco Gauff, tennis player
- March 20 – Christopher Jaime, soccer player
- March 21 – Forrest Wheeler, actor
- March 23 – Asher Hong, artistic gymnast
- March 25 – Jenna Hutchins, long-distance runner
- March 27 – Quinn Sullivan, soccer player

=== April ===
- April 5 – Hurricane Wisdom, rapper
- April 7 – Brandan Craig, soccer player
- April 15 – Christian Torres, soccer player
- April 23 – Fred Richard, artistic gymnast
- April 25 – Natalie Jane, singer
- April 26
  - Jordan Harrison, basketball player
  - Kobi Henry, soccer player
- April 28
  - Noah Allen, soccer player
  - Tony Leone, soccer player

=== May ===
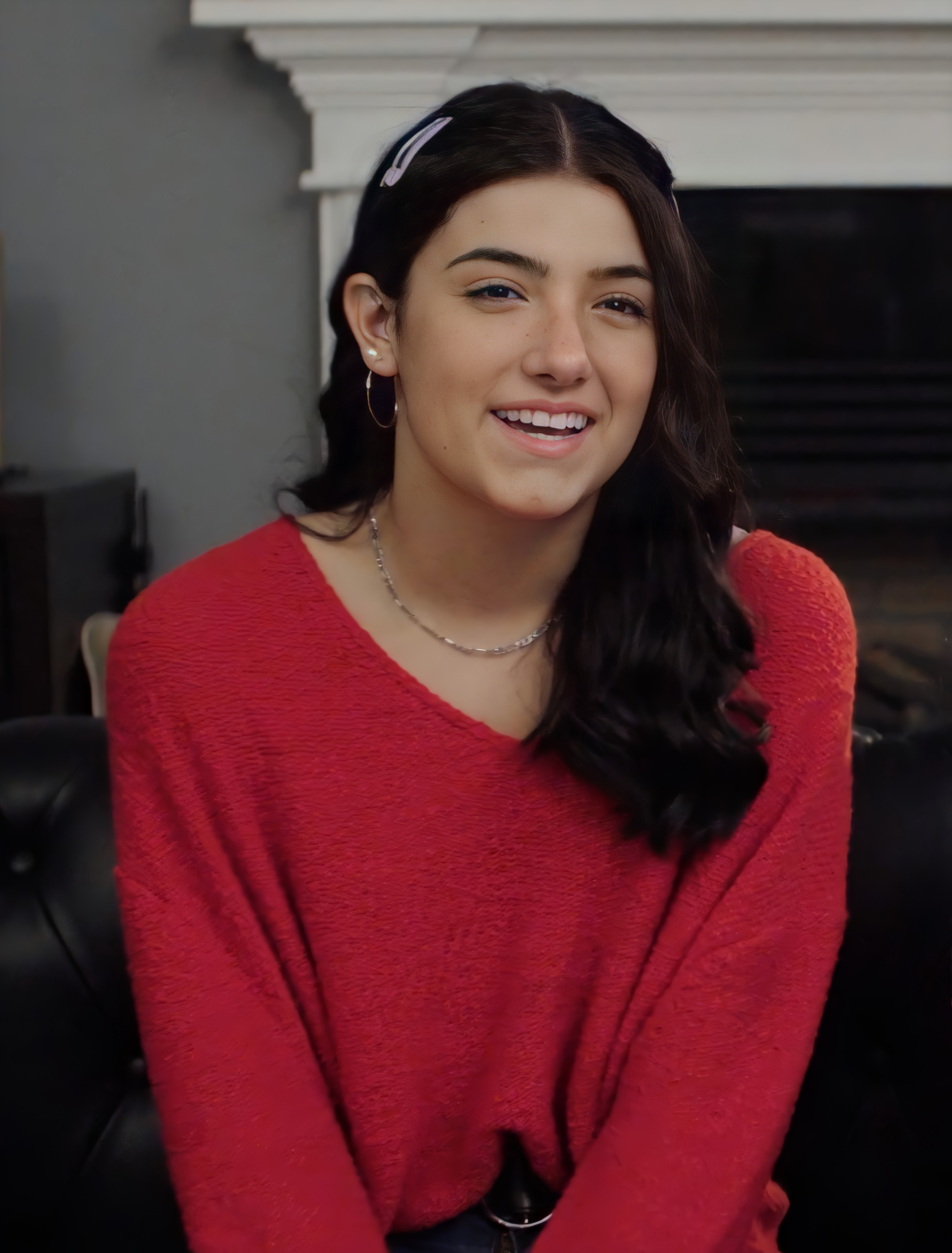
Charli D'Amelio

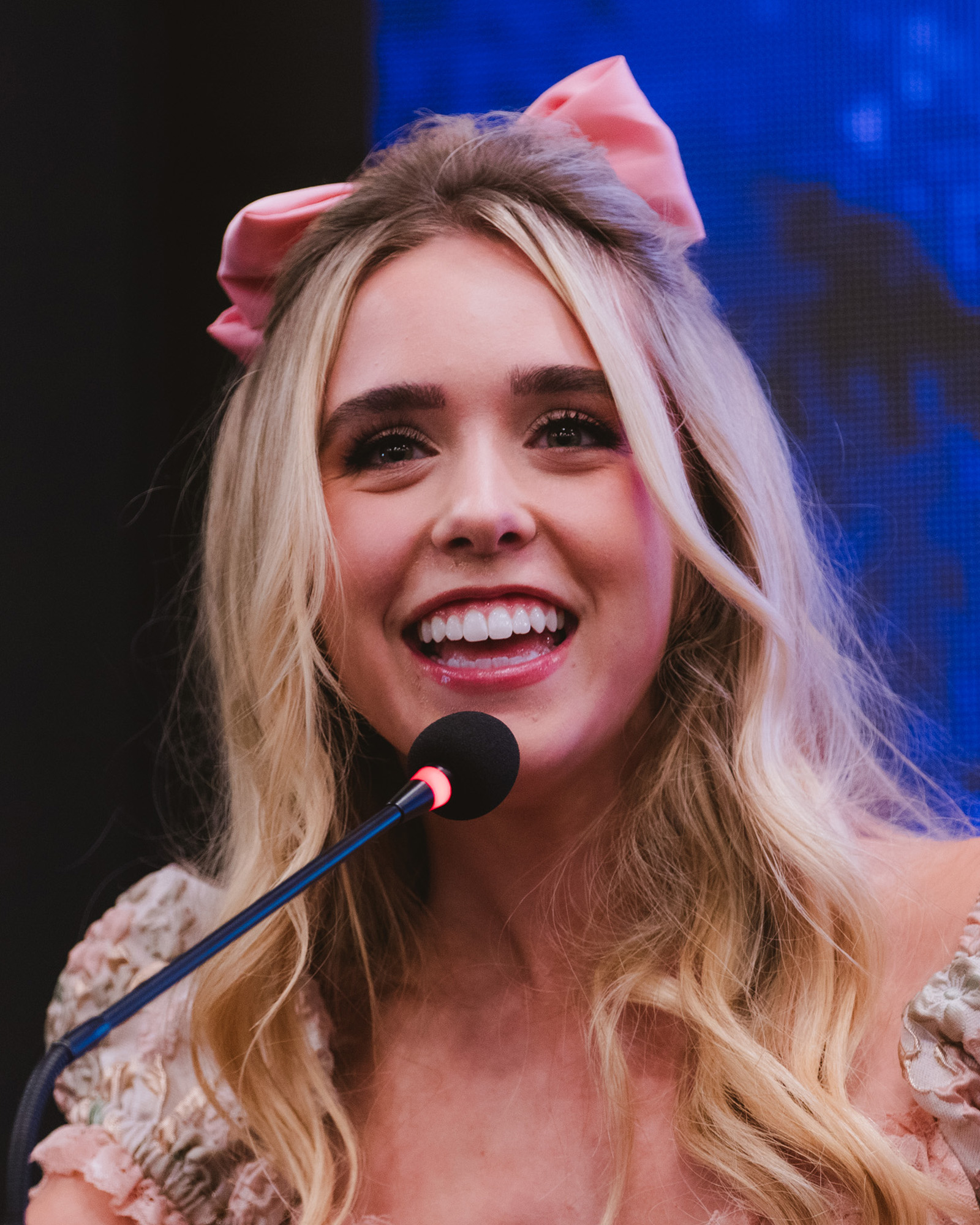
Jenna Davis

- May 1 – Charli D'Amelio, social media personality
- May 2 – Anastasia Pagonis, Paralympic swimmer
- May 3 – Nare Avetian, soccer player
- May 5
  - Jenna Davis, actress
  - Olivia Greaves, gymnast
- May 13 – Oliver Bell, actor
- May 15 – Gabriel Slonina, soccer player
- May 16 – Salvador Ramos, mass murderer (d. 2022)
- May 17 – Victoria Lee, mixed martial artist (d. 2023)
- May 19 – Saylor Curda, actress
- May 21 – Jeff Dewsnup, soccer player
- May 22 – Peyton Elizabeth Lee, actress
- May 27 – Allan Rodriguez, soccer player

=== June ===
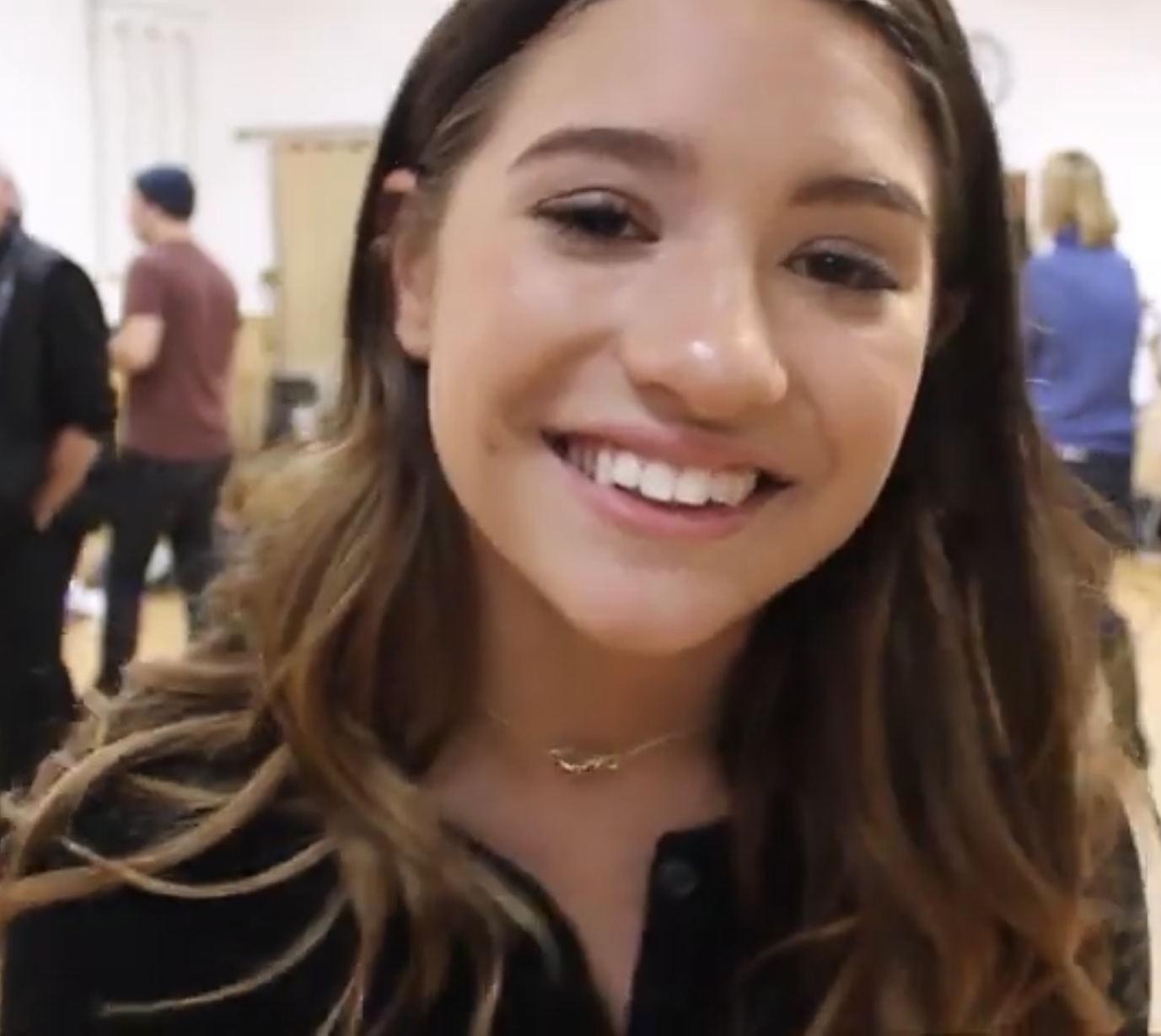
Mackenzie Ziegler

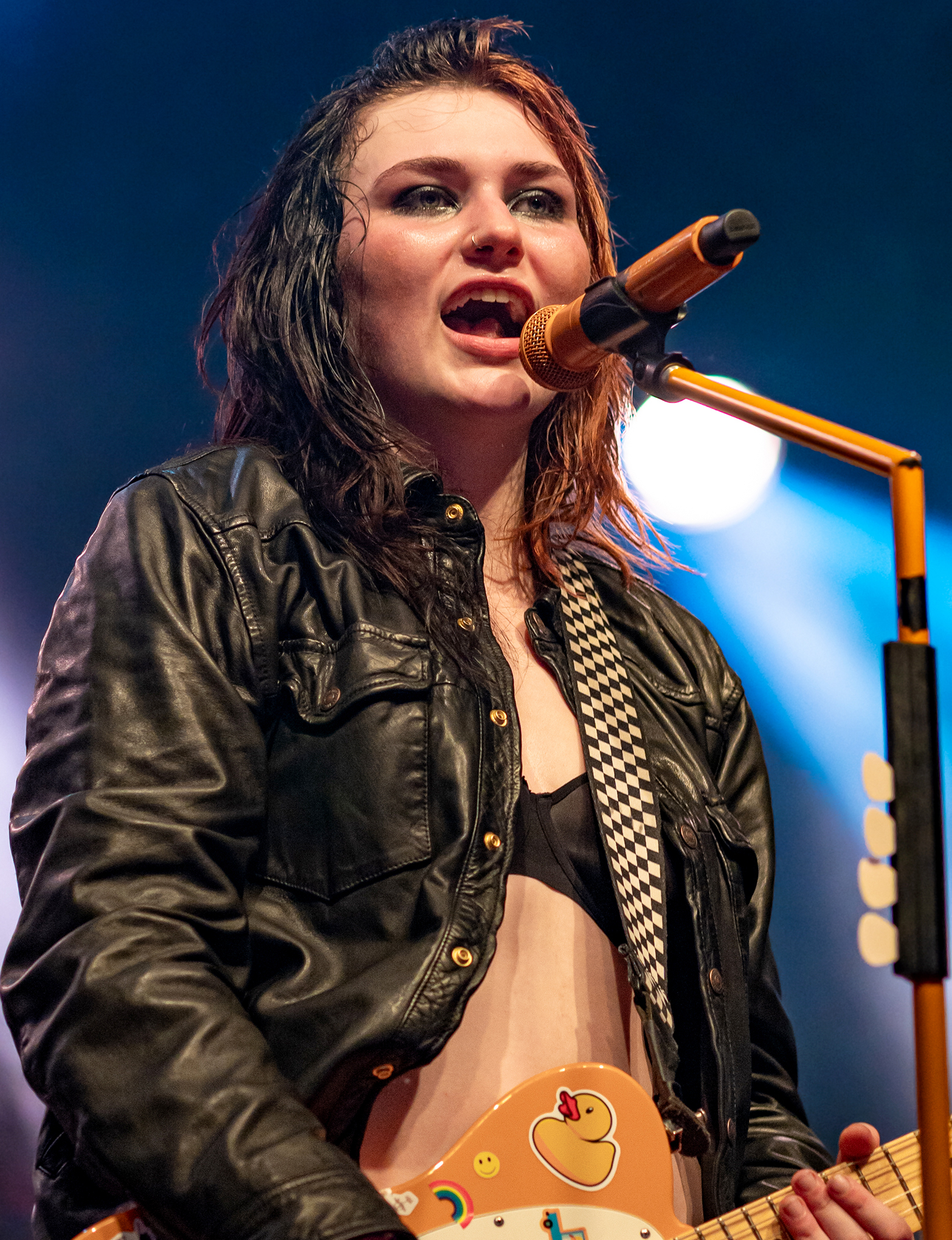
Gayle

- June 1 – Ixhelt González, wheelchair basketball player
- June 4
  - Sammy Smith, stock car racing driver
  - Mackenzie Ziegler, singer, dancer, and actress
- June 8 – Francesca Capaldi, actress
- June 10 – Gayle, singer
- June 15 – Sterling Jerins, actress
- June 23 – Ashley Sessa, indoor and field hockey player
- June 25 – Madison Reyes, actress and singer
- June 26 – Mikey Williams, basketball player
- June 30 – Claire Curzan, swimmer

=== July ===
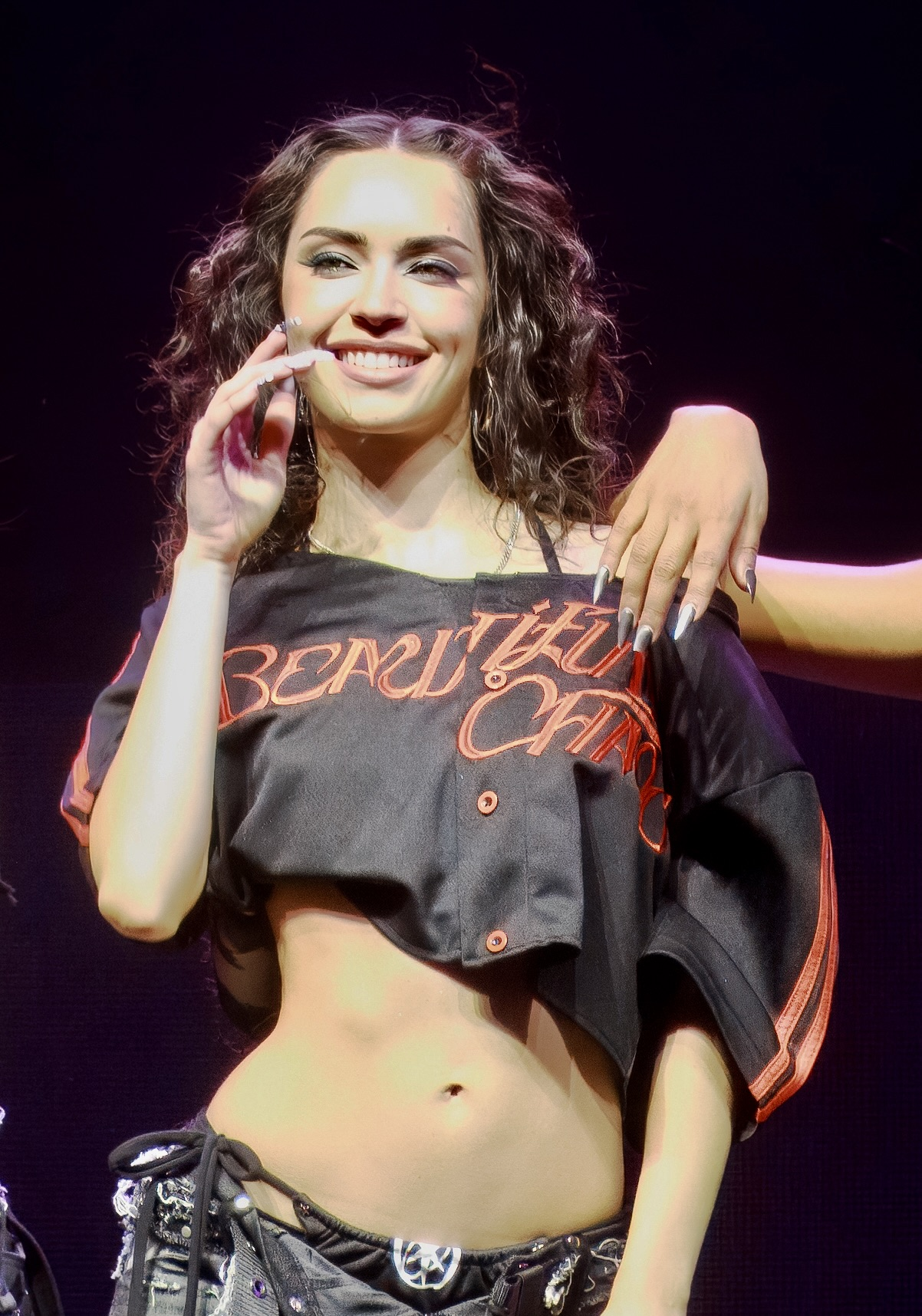
Daniela Avanzini

- July 1
  - Daniela Avanzini, singer and dancer
  - Jackson Hopkins, soccer player
- July 2 – Caitlin Carmichael, actress
- July 14 – Brighton Zeuner, skateboarder
- July 16 – Tonie Morgan, basketball player

=== August ===
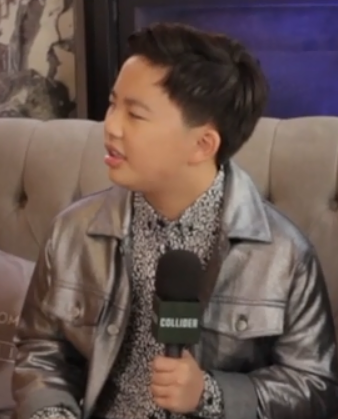
Albert Tsai

- August 1 – Neveah Gallegos, murder victim (d. 2007)
- August 2 – Marlowe Peyton, actress
- August 5 – Albert Tsai, actor
- August 14 – Marsai Martin, actress
- August 15 – Thomas Williams, soccer player
- August 19 – Siena Agudong, actress
- August 20 – Alexa Pano, golfer
- August 28 – Lilly Lippeatt, gymnast
- August 30 – Juan Alvarez, soccer player

=== September ===
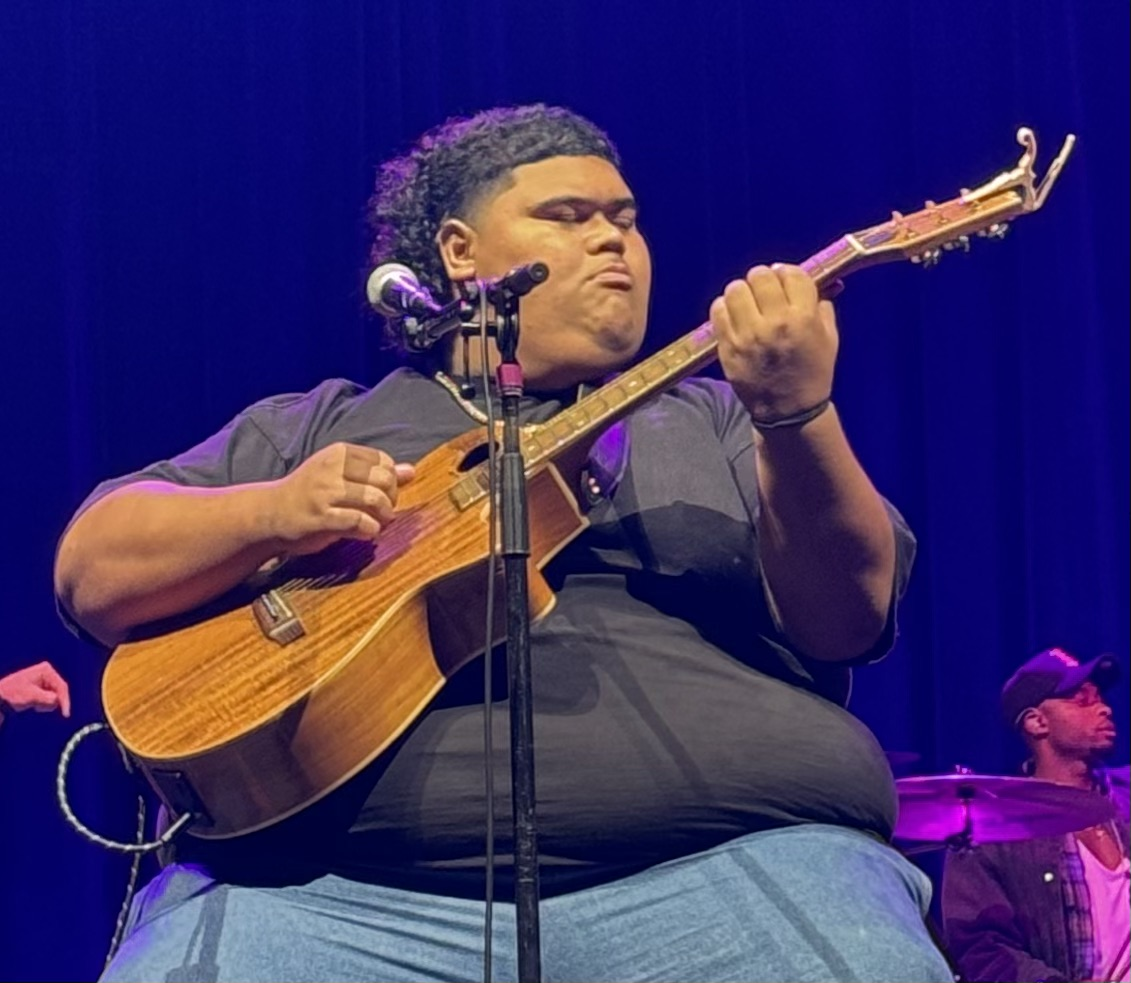
Iam Tongi

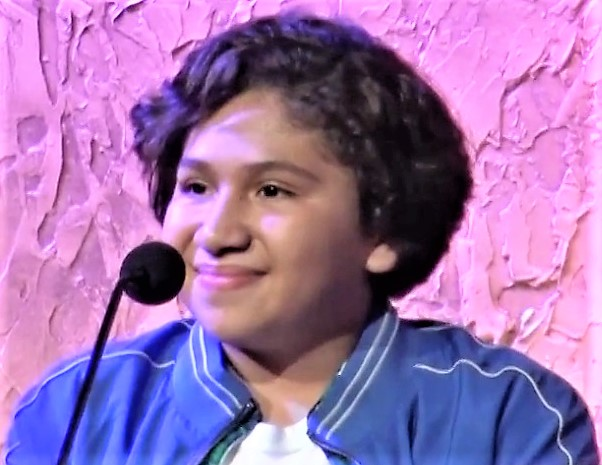
Anthony Gonzalez

- September 1 – Iam Tongi, singer
- September 2 – Reece Gold, racing driver
- September 5 – Robin Montgomery, tennis player
- September 10
  - Gabriel Bateman, actor
  - Oona Brown, ice dancer
- September 23 – Anthony Gonzalez, actor
- September 28 – Mikaila Ulmer, entrepreneur

=== October ===
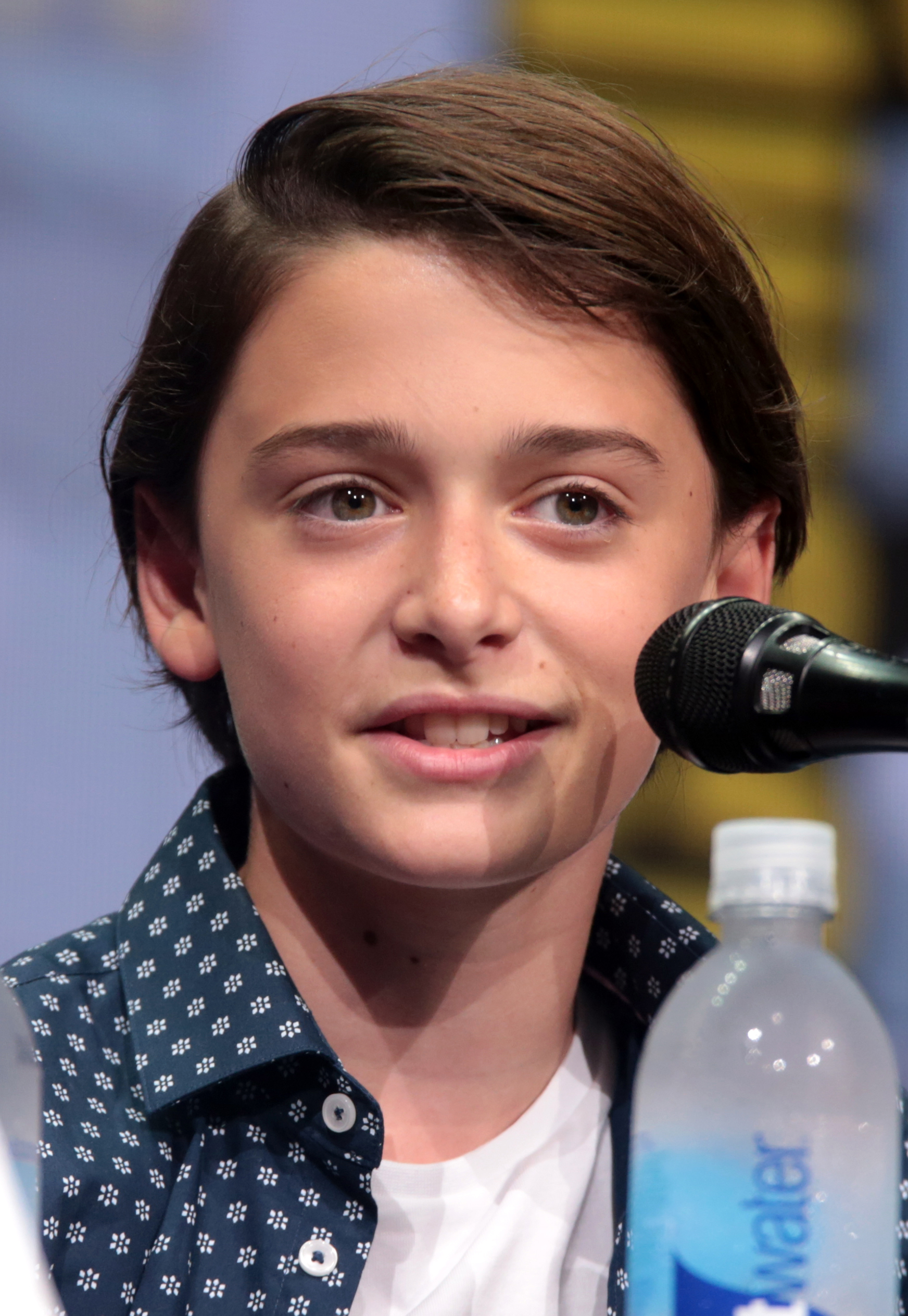
Noah Schnapp

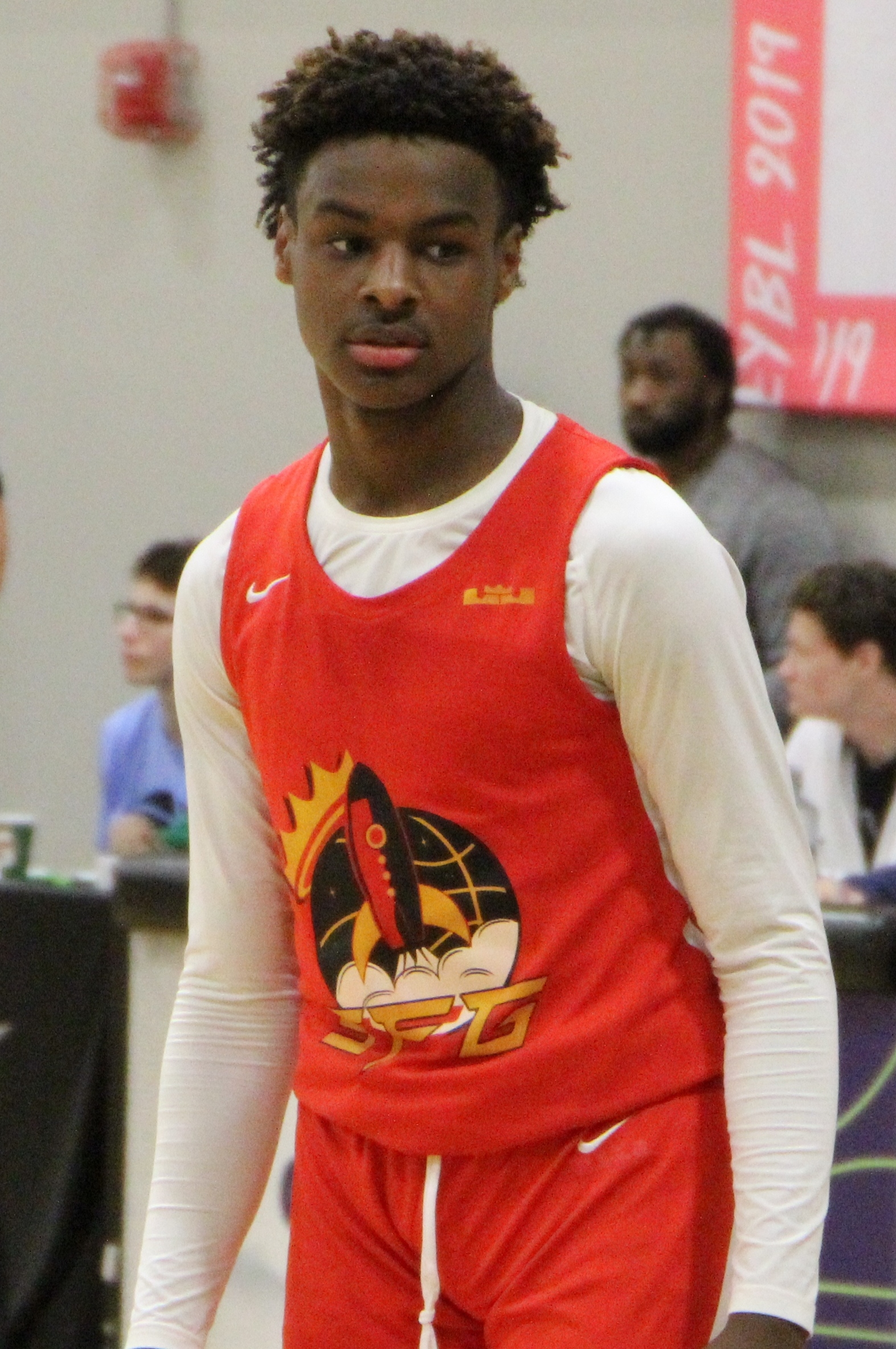
Bronny James

- October 3 – Noah Schnapp, actor
- October 5 – Reese Brantmeier, tennis player
- October 6 – Bronny James, basketball player and son of LeBron James
- October 9 – Katarina Wolfkostin, ice dancer
- October 12 – Darci Lynne, ventriloquist, singer, and actress
- October 15 – Marilena Kitromilis, figure skater
- October 17 – Javier Mariona, soccer player
- October 18 – Erik Dueñas, soccer player
- October 26 – Pearse O'Brien, soccer player
- October 30 – Elisha Henig, actor

=== November ===
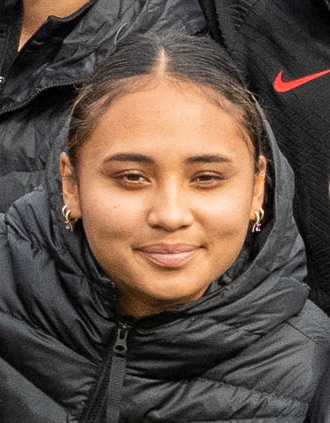
Alyssa Thompson

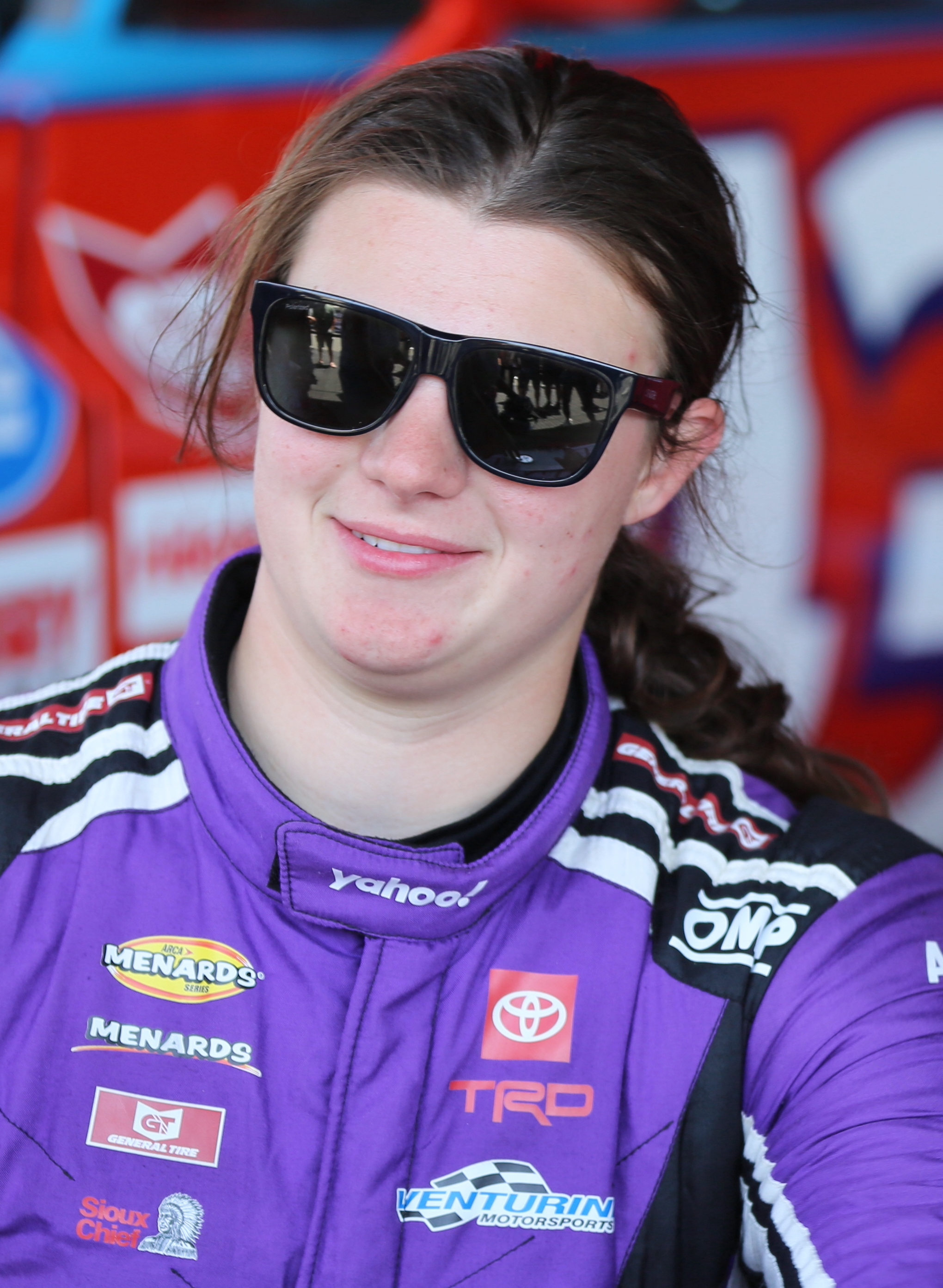
Isabella Robusto

- November 1 – Jayden Bartels, social media personality
- November 4 – Isabella Robusto, race car driver
- November 7 – Alyssa Thompson, soccer player
- November 9 – Ian Mai, soccer player
- November 10 – Bryce Wettstein, skateboarder
- November 11 – Oakes Fegley, actor
- November 19 – Darren Yapi, soccer player
- November 27 – Jet Jurgensmeyer, actor

=== December ===
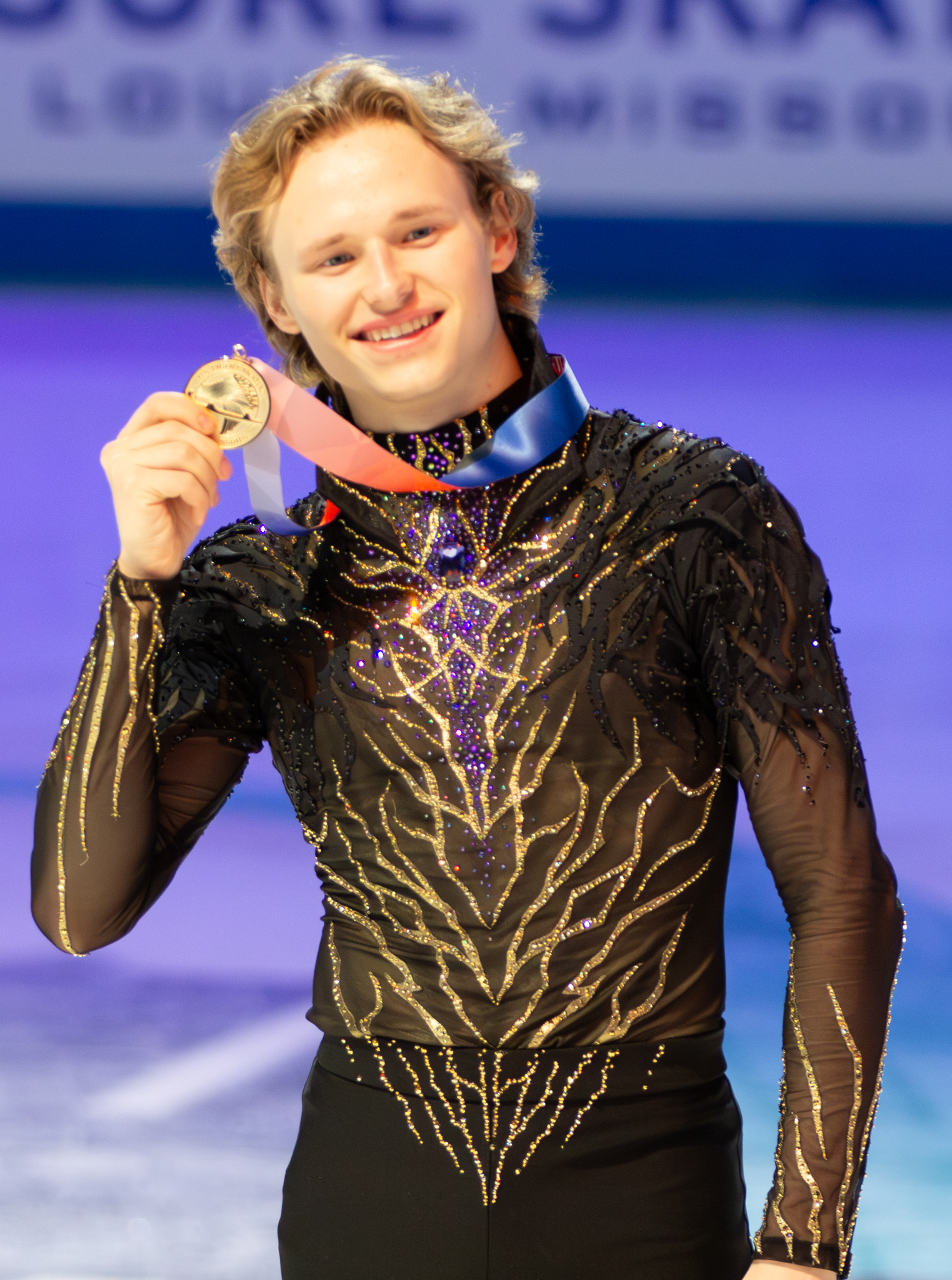
Ilia Malinin

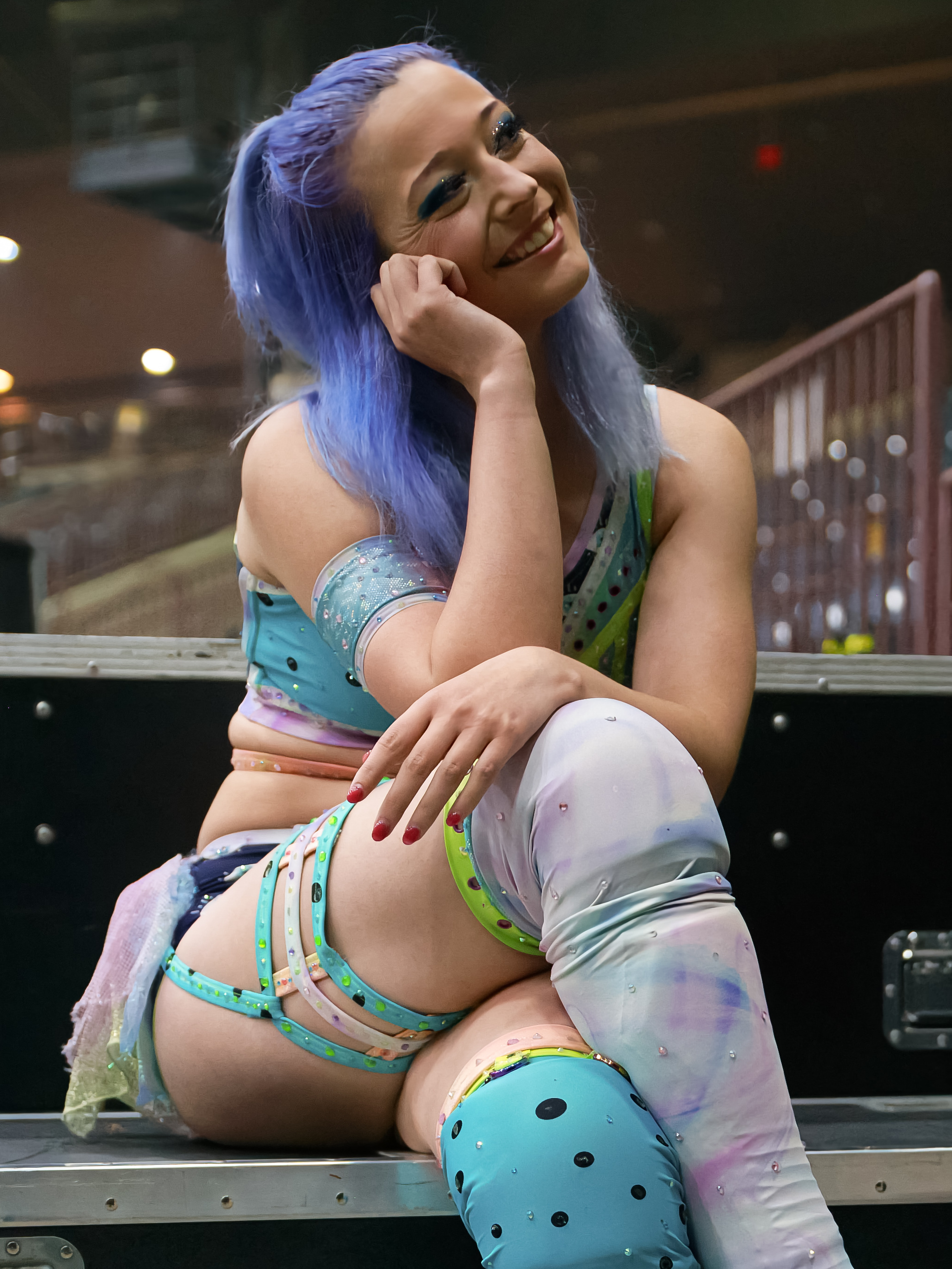
Billie Starkz

- December 2 – Ilia Malinin, U.S. Olympic figure skater
- December 5 – Jules LeBlanc, internet personality and actress
- December 8 – Billie Starkz, pro wrestler
- December 13
  - Aiden Flowers, actor
  - Matt Ox, rapper
- December 18 – Isabella Crovetti, child actress (Shimmer and Shine, Vampirina)
- December 20 – Rafael Jauregui, soccer player
- December 22
  - Bryce Gheisar, actor
  - Caleb Wiley, soccer player
- December 24 – Cherish Perrywinkle, murder victim (d. 2013)
- December 28 – Miles Brown, actor, dancer and rapper
- December 30 – Owen Wolff, Filipino footballer

== Deaths ==
=== January ===
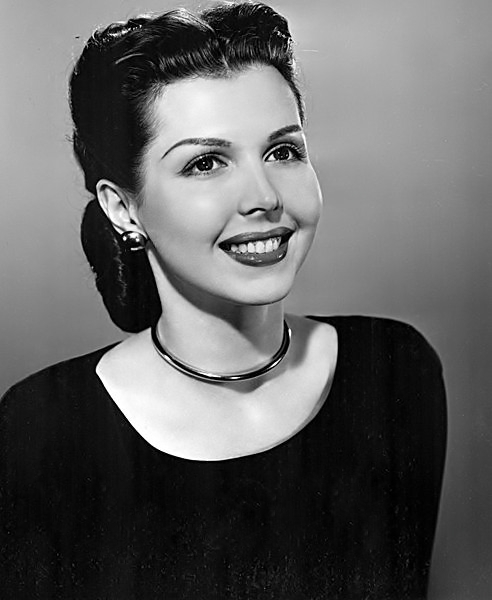
Ann Miller

- January 1 – Elma Lewis, arts educator (b. 1921)
- January 2 – Lynn Cartwright, actress (b. 1927)
- January 3 – David Lipschultz, journalist (b. 1970)
- January 5 – Tug McGraw, baseball player (b. 1944)
- January 6 – Francesco Scavullo, photographer (b. 1921)
- January 8 – John A. Gambling, radio host (b. 1930)
- January 9 – Yinka Dare, basketball player (b. 1972)
- c. January 11 – Spalding Gray, actor and screenwriter (b. 1941)
- January 12 – Randy VanWarmer, singer-songwriter (b. 1955)
- January 13
  - Phillip Crosby, American singer (b. 1934)
  - Mike Goliat, American baseball player (b. 1921)
- January 14
  - Uta Hagen, American actress (b. 1919)
  - Ron O'Neal, American actor, director, and screenwriter (b. 1937)
- January 17
  - Carlton R. Sickles, American lawyer and politician (b. 1921)
  - Ray Stark, American film producer (b. 1915)
  - Noble Willingham, American actor (b. 1931)
- January 19 – Harry E. Claiborne, lawyer and judge (b. 1917)
- January 22 – Ann Miller, American dancer and actress (b. 1923)
- January 23
  - Albert Henderson, actor (b. 1915)
  - Bob Keeshan, actor, clown and television producer (b. 1927)
- January 27 – Jack Paar, comedian and television host (b. 1918)
- January 28
  - Lloyd M. Bucher, U.S. Naval Officer (b. 1927)
  - Joe Viterelli, American actor (b. 1937)
- January 29 – Ed Sciaky, Philadelphia broadcaster and disk jockey. (b. 1948)
- January 30 – Scott Walker, professional boxer (b. 1969)

=== February ===
- February 3
  - Jason Raize, actor and activist (b. 1975)
  - Cornelius Bumpus, jazz musician (b. 1945)
- February 4 – Johnny Leartice Robinson, murderer (b. 1952)
- February 5 – Thomas Hinman Moorer, navy admiral (b. 1912)
- February 10 – Paul Ilyinsky, politician (b. 1928)
- February 11 – Tony Pope, voice actor (b. 1947)
- February 13 – Ted Tappe, baseball player (b. 1931)
- February 15 – Jan Miner, actress (b. 1917)
- February 16 – Doris Troy, singer (b. 1937)
- February 23 – Carl Anderson, singer and actor (b. 1945)
- February 22 – Andy Seminick, baseball player, coach and manager (b. 1920)
- February 24
  - Ernest Burke, baseball player (b. 1924)
  - John Randolph, actor (b. 1915)
- February 27 – Paul Sweezy, American economist and editor (b. 1910)
- February 28 – Daniel J. Boorstin, historian and Librarian of Congress (b. 1914)

=== March ===
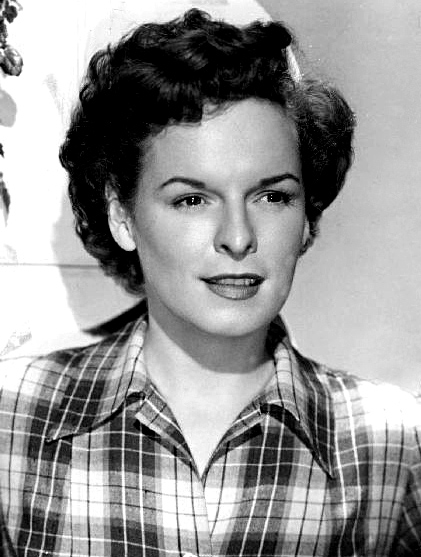
Mercedes McCambridge

- March 2
  - Mercedes McCambridge, American actress (b. 1916)
  - Marge Schott, American Major League Baseball owner (b. 1928)
- March 3 – Cecily Adams, American actress (b. 1958)
- March 5 – Walt Gorney, American actor (b. 1912)
- March 6
  - Frances Dee, American actress (b. 1909)
  - Hercules, American professional wrestler (b. 1956)
- March 7 – Paul Winfield, American actor (b. 1939)
- March 8
  - Tichi Wilkerson Kassel, American film personality and publisher (b. 1926)
  - Robert Pastorelli, American actor (b. 1954)
- March 11 – Philip Arthur Fisher, American stock investor (b. 1907)
- March 16 – Brian Bianchini, American model (b. 1978)
- March 17 – J. J. Jackson, radio and television personality (b. 1941)
- March 18 – Gene Bearden, American baseball player (b. 1920)
- March 21 – Robert Snyder, American documentary filmmaker (b. 1916)
- March 25 – Jan Berry, American musician (b. 1941)
- March 26
  - J. Edward Roush, American politician (b. 1920)
  - Jan Sterling, American actress (b. 1921)
- March 27 – Adán Sánchez, American singer (b. 1984)
- March 28 – Art James, American game-show host (b. 1929)
- March 30 - Alistair Cooke, British-born American journalist (b. 1908)

=== April ===
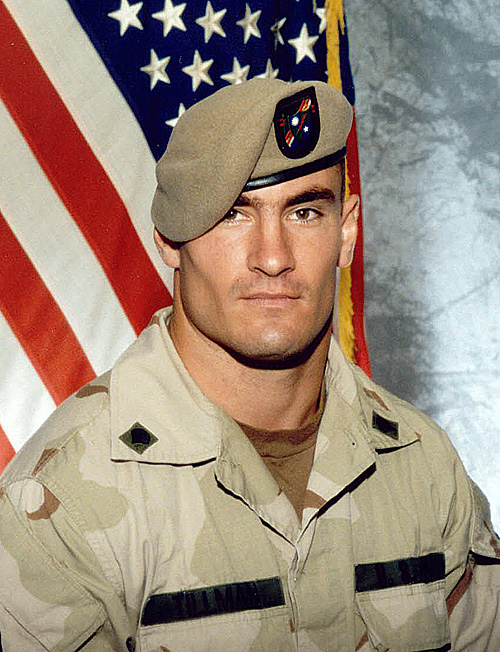
Pat Tillman

- April 1
  - Aaron Bank, colonel, founded the US Army Special Forces (b. 1902)
  - Carrie Snodgress, American actress (b. 1945)
- April 2 – Harold A. Fidler, American Associate Director of the Lawrence Radiation Laboratory (b. 1910)
- April 4 – George Bamberger, American baseball player and manager (b. 1923)
- April 9 – Harry Babbitt, American singer (b. 1913)
- April 11 – Hy Gotkin, American basketball player (b. 1922)
- April 16
  - Elwood Cooke, American tennis player (b. 1913)
  - Wilmot N. Hess, American physicist (b. 1926)
- April 19 – Jim Cantalupo, American businessman (b. 1943)
- April 20 – Al Stiller, American cyclist (b. 1923)
- April 22
  - Jason Dunham, American marine (b. 1981)
  - Pat Tillman, American football player and soldier killed in action, died in Sperah, Afghanistan (b. 1976)
- April 24 – Estée Lauder, businesswoman (b. 1906)
- April 26 – Hubert Selby, Jr., American writer (b. 1928)

=== May ===
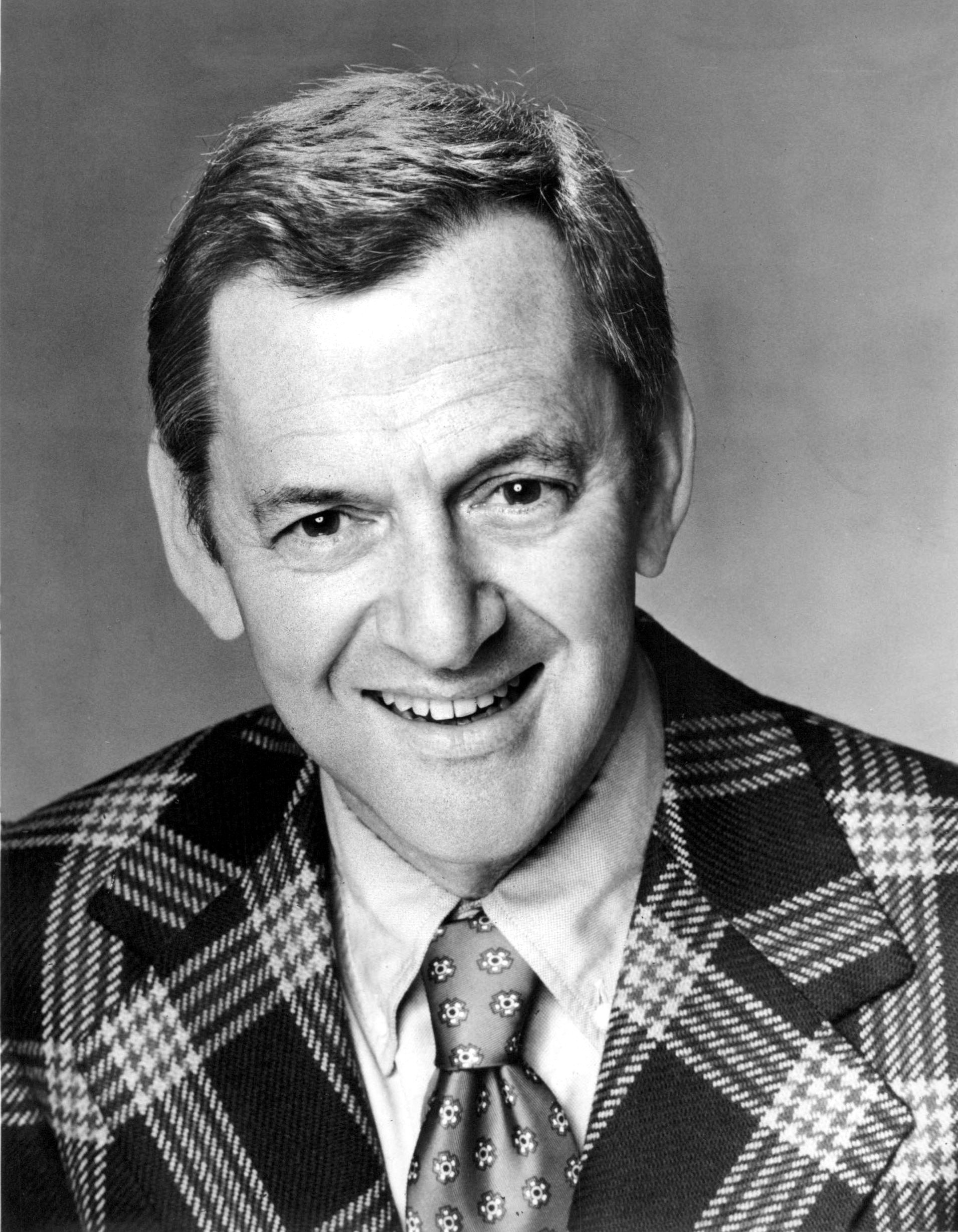
Tony Randall

- May 1 – Nelson Gidding, American screenwriter (b. 1919)
- May 2 – Moe Burtschy, American baseball player (b. 1922)
- May 6
  - Virginia Capers, American actress (b. 1925)
  - Barney Kessel, American jazz guitarist (b. 1923)
- May 7 – Nicholas Berg, American businessman (b. 1978)
- May 9 – Alan King, American comedian and actor (b. 1927)
- May 12 – Alexander Skutch, American naturalist and writer (b. 1904)
- May 14
  - Charlotte Benkner, American supercentenarian (b. 1889)
  - Anna Lee, British actress (b. 1913)
- May 15 – William H. Hinton, American farmer and writer (b. 1919)
- May 16
  - June Taylor, American choreographer (b. 1917)
  - Billy Stone, American football player (b. 1925)
- May 17 – Tony Randall, American actor, comedian, producer, and director (b. 1920)
- May 18 – Elvin Jones, American jazz drummer (b. 1927)
- May 19 – Jack Eckerd, American businessman (b. 1913)
- May 21 – Gene Wood, American television personality (b. 1925)
- May 22 – Richard Biggs, American actor (b. 1960)
- May 23 – Trudy Marshall, American actress (b. 1920)
- May 28 – Irene Manning, American actress and singer (b. 1912)
- May 29 – Archibald Cox, 31st United States Solicitor General from 1961 till 1965. (b. 1912)

=== June ===
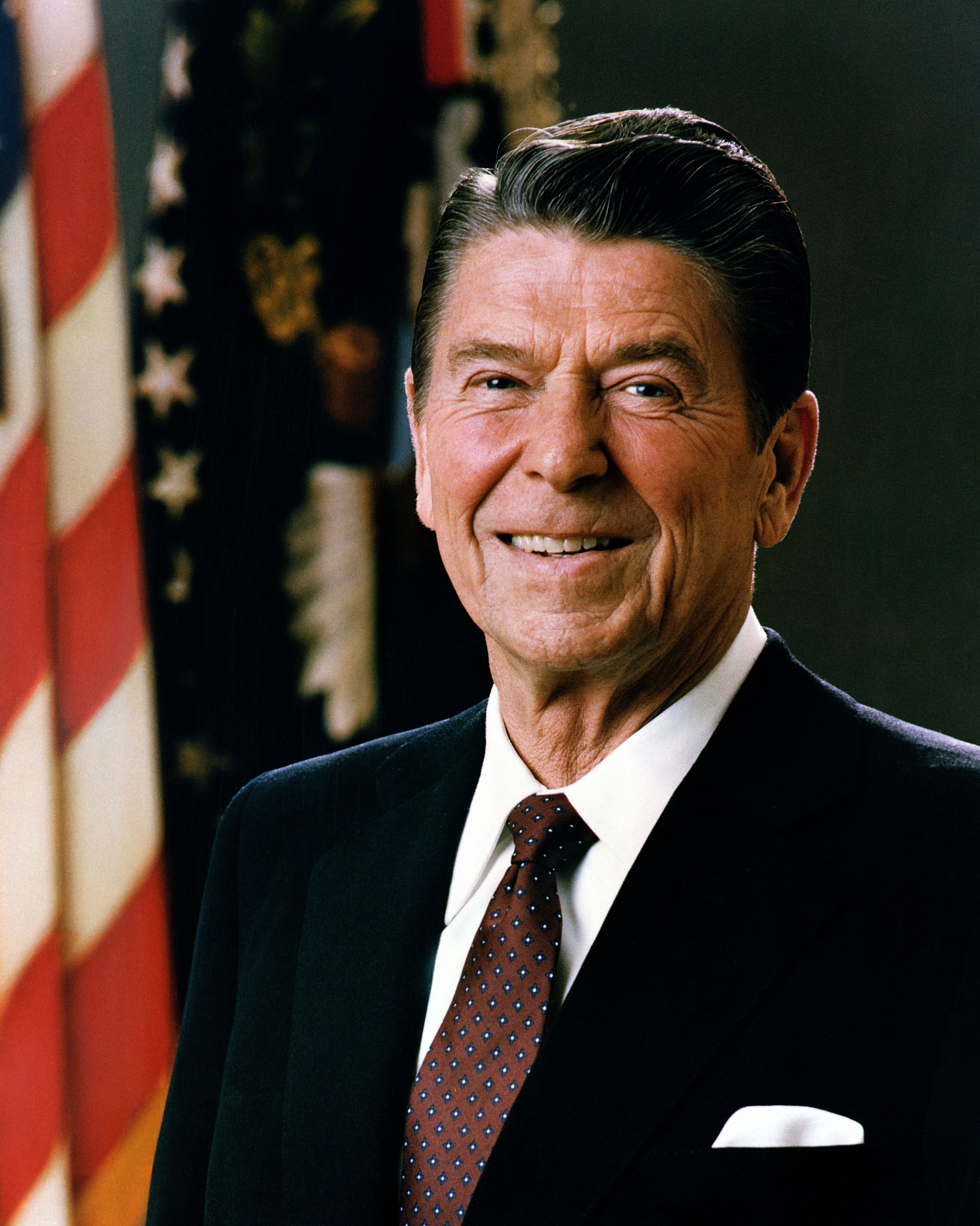
Ronald Reagan

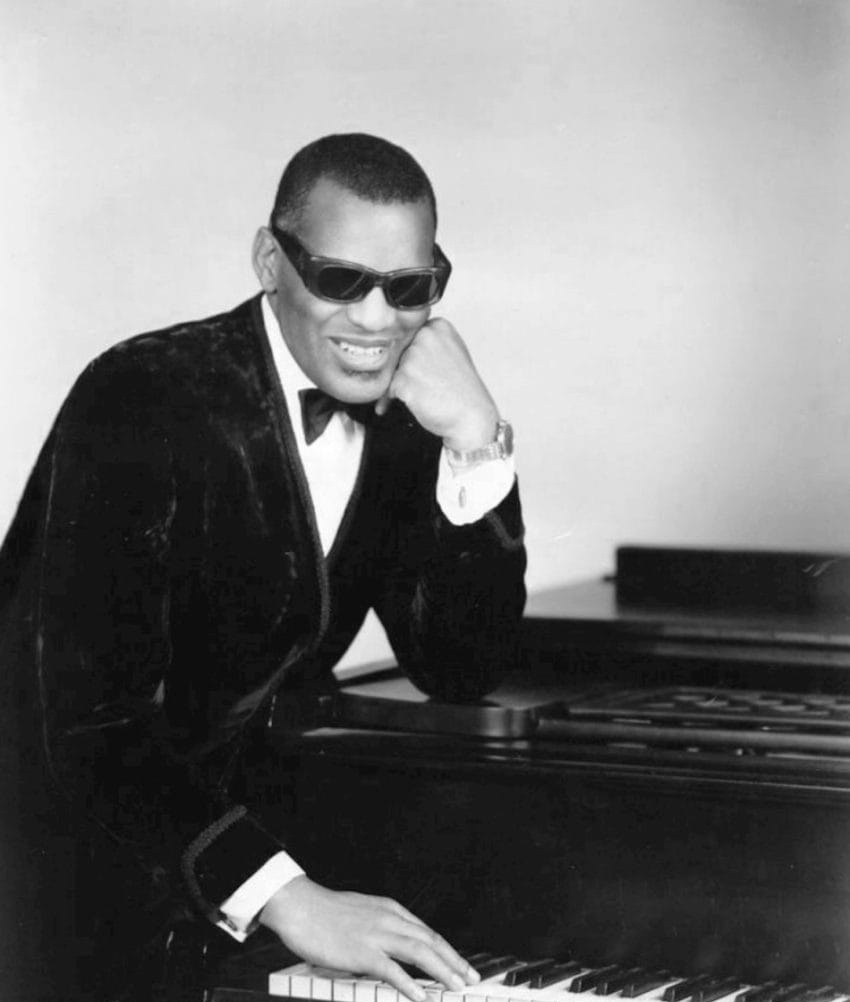
Ray Charles

- June 1 – William Manchester, American historian (b. 1922)
- June 2 – Loyd Sigmon, American amateur radio broadcaster (b. 1909)
- June 3 – Morris Schappes, American educator, writer, political activist, historian, and magazine editor (b. 1907)
- June 4 – Steve Lacy, American jazz soprano saxophonist (b. 1934)
- June 5 – Ronald Reagan, American politician and actor, 40th president of the United States (b. 1911)
- June 6 – Riley Fox, American murder victim (b. 2001)
- June 7
  - Joseph L. Doob, American mathematician (b. 1910)
  - Donald Trumbull, American special effects artist (b. 1909)
- June 9 – Rosey Brown, American football player (b. 1932)
- June 10 – Ray Charles, American singer and musician (b. 1930)
- June 13
  - Dorothy Lavinia Brown, American surgeon, legislator, and teacher (b. 1914)
  - Danny Dark, American voice announcer (b. 1938)
  - Dick Durrance, American alpine ski racer (b. 1914)
- June 16 – Herman Goldstine, American mathematician and computer scientist (b. 1913)
- June 21 – Ruth Leach Amonette, American businesswoman (b. 1916)
- June 22
  - Bob Bemer, American computer scientist (b. 1920)
  - Thomas Gold, Austrian-born American astrophysicist (b. 1920)
  - Carlton Skinner, first civilian governor of Guam (b. 1913)
  - Mattie Stepanek, American poet (b. 1990)
- June 24 – Barbara Weeks, actress (b. 1913)
- June 27 – George Patton IV, U.S. Army general (b. 1923)
- June 30 – Chris Alcaide, American actor (b. 1922)

=== July ===
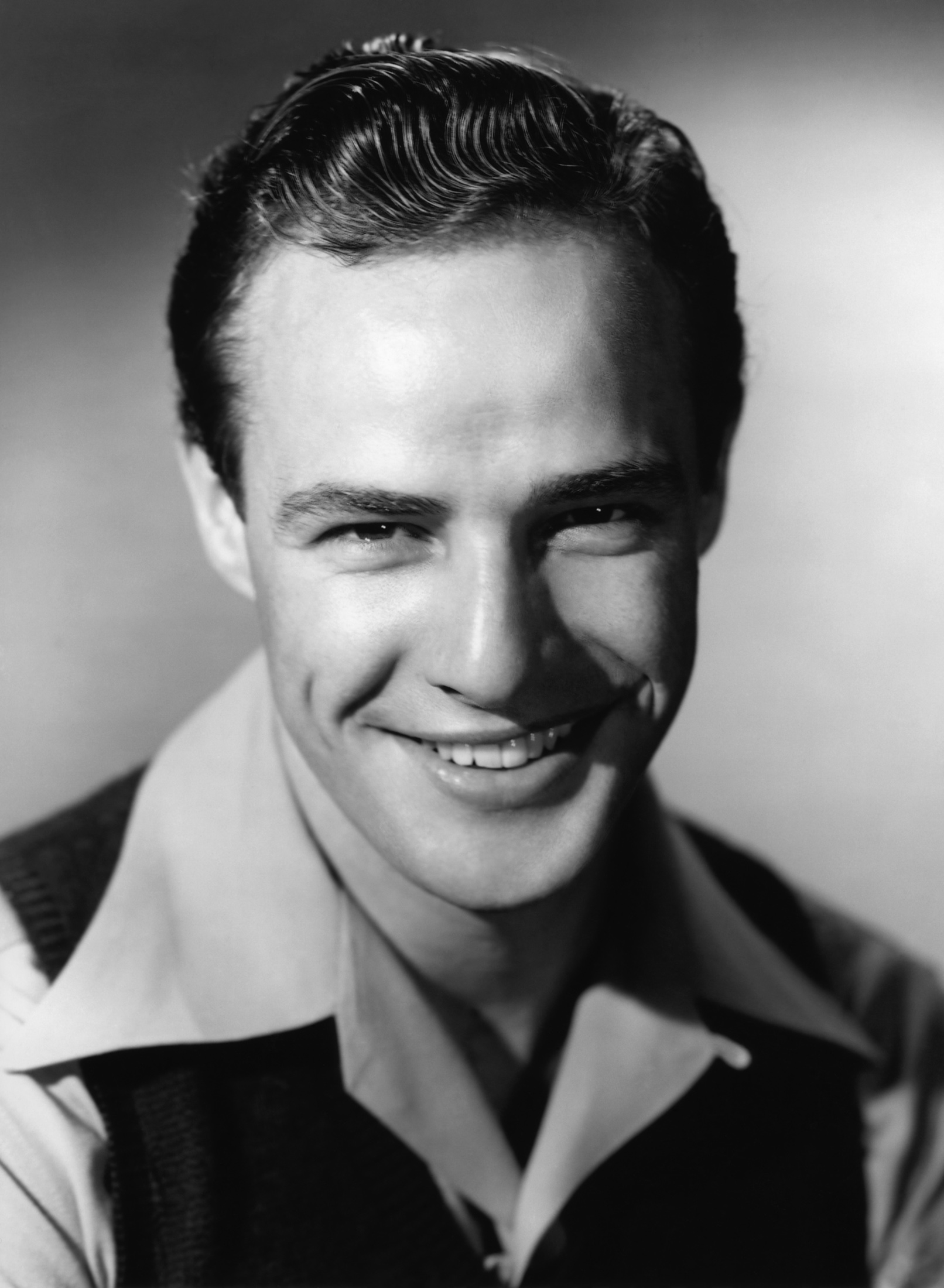
- Marlon Brando
  July 1 – Marlon Brando, American actor (b. 1924)
- July 5 – Rodger Ward, American race car driver (b. 1921)
- July 6
  - Eric Douglas, American actor (b. 1958)
  - Ignatius J. Galantin, United States Navy admiral (b. 1910)
  - Syreeta Wright, American singer-songwriter (b. 1946)
- July 7 – Jeff Smith, American chef and cookbook author (b. 1939)
- July 8 – Albert Francis Capone, son of Al Capone (b. 1918)
- July 9
  - Rudy LaRusso, American basketball player (b. 1937)
  - Isabel Sanford, American actress (b. 1917)
- July 16 – Charles Sweeney, American WWII pilot (b. 1919)
- July 21
  - Jerry Goldsmith, American composer (b. 1929)
  - Edward B. Lewis, American Nobel geneticist (b. 1918)
- July 26 – William A. Mitchell, food chemist and inventor (b. 1911)
- July 28
  - Jackson Beck, American actor (b. 1912)
  - Francis Crick, English molecular biologist, biophysicist, and neuroscientist (b. 1916)
  - Eugene Roche, American actor (b. 1928)
- July 31 – Virginia Grey, American actress (b. 1917)

=== August ===
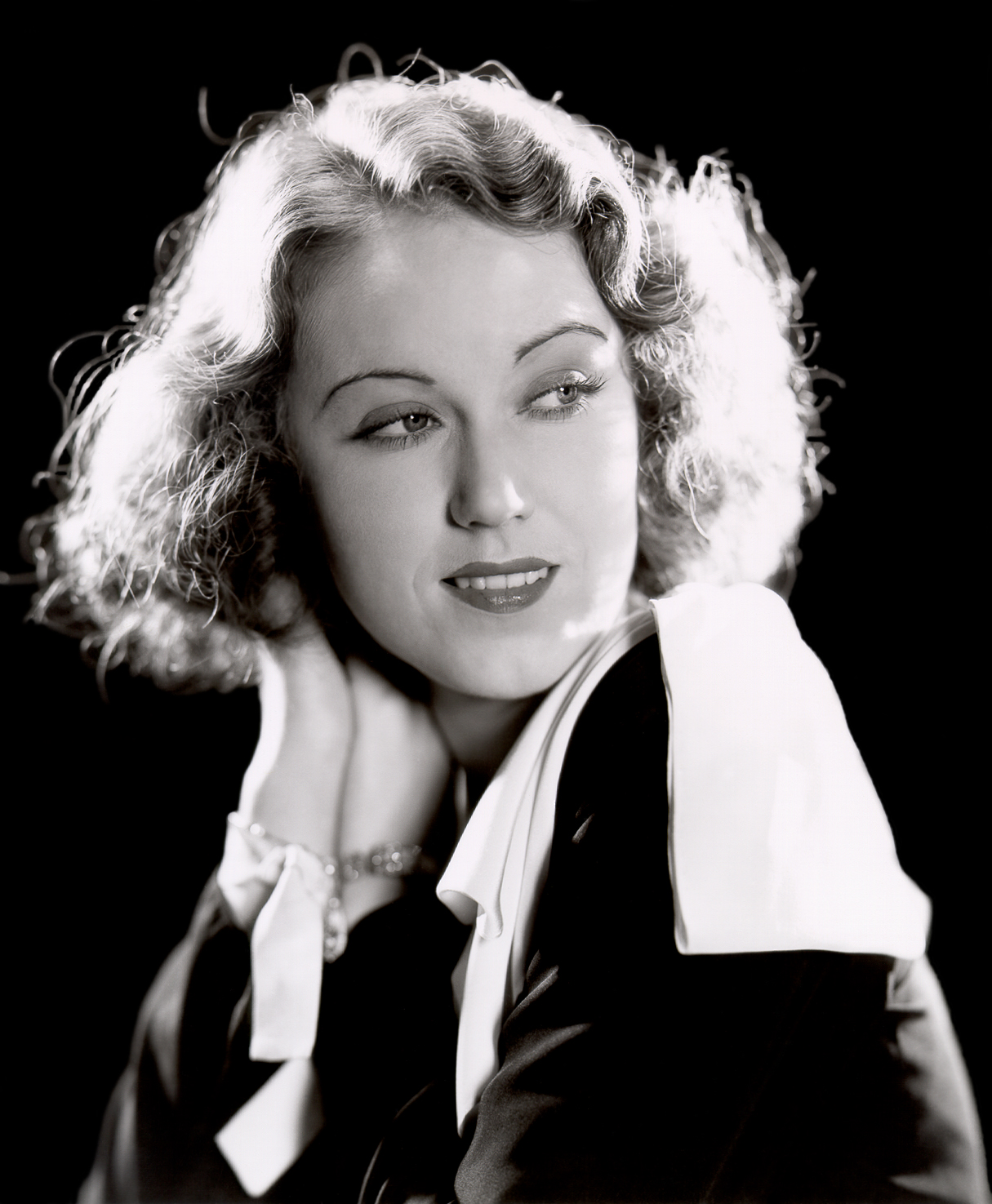
Fay Wray

- August 1
  - Philip Abelson, American Nobel physicist (b. 1913)
  - Alex Scott, notable victim and philanthropist (b. 1996)
- August 6 – Rick James, American musician (b. 1948)
- August 7 – Red Adair, American oil well firefighter (b. 1915)
- August 8 – Fay Wray, Canadian-American actress (b. 1907)
- August 13 – Julia Child, American chef, author and television host (b. 1912)
- August 17 – Clyde Roberts, American college football player (b. 1909)
- August 18 – Elmer Bernstein, American composer (b. 1922)
- August 24 – Elisabeth Kübler-Ross, Swiss-American psychiatrist (b. 1926)
- August 26 – Laura Branigan, American singer (b. 1952)
- August 27
  - Willie Crawford, American baseball player (b. 1946)
  - Susan Peretz, American actress (b. 1940)
- August 30 – Fred Lawrence Whipple, American astronomer (b. 1906)

=== September ===
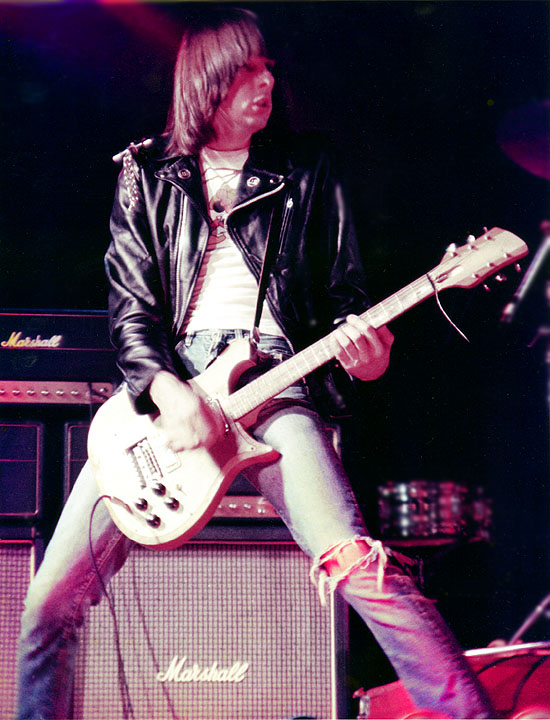
Johnny Ramone

- September 2
  - Bob O. Evans, IBM computer scientist (b. 1927)
  - Donald Leslie, American creator of the Leslie speaker (b. 1911)
  - Vonda Phelps, American child actress (b. 1915)
- September 5 – Steve Wayne, American actor (b. 1920)
- September 8 – Frank Thomas, American animator and pianist (b. 1912)
- September 11 – Fred Ebb, American musician (b. 1928)
- September 14 – Reynaldo Guerra Garza, American federal judge (b. 1915)
- September 15 – Johnny Ramone, American guitarist (b. 1948)
- September 16 – Izora Armstead, American singer-songwriter (b. 1942)
- September 18
  - Russ Meyer, American director and photographer (b. 1922)
  - Marvin Mitchelson, American lawyer (b. 1928)
- September 19 – Skeeter Davis, American country music singer-songwriter (b. 1931)
- September 22 – Ray Traylor Jr., American professional wrestler (b. 1963)
- September 28 – Geoffrey Beene, American fashion designer (b. 1924)

=== October ===
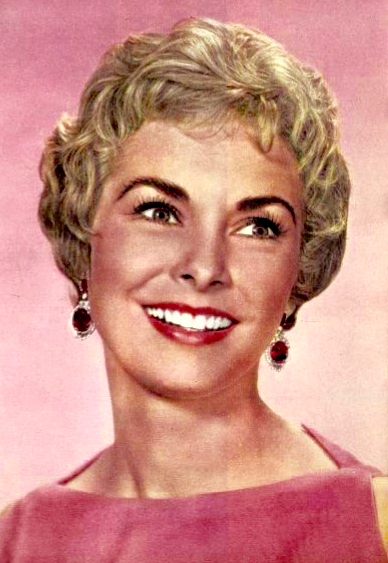
Janet Leigh

- October 1 – Richard Avedon, American photographer (b. 1923)
- October 3 – Janet Leigh, American actress (b. 1927)
- October 4 – Gordon Cooper, American aeronautical engineer, test pilot and astronaut (b. 1927)
- October 5 – Rodney Dangerfield, American comedian and actor (b. 1921)
- October 10 – Christopher Reeve, American actor, film director, producer, screenwriter, writer and activist (b. 1952)
- October 16 – Pierre Salinger, American politician, and television journalist, died in Cavaillon, France (b. 1925)
- October 17 – Julius Harris, American actor (b. 1923)
- October 23 – Robert Merrill, American opera singer and actor (b. 1917)
- October 26 – Helen Elsie Austin, American attorney (b. 1908)
- October 28 – Charles F. Wheeler, American cinematographer (b. 1915)
- October 29 – Vaughn Meader, American comedian, musician, and impressionist (b. 1936)

=== November ===
- November 1 – Mac Dre, rapper (b. 1970)
- November 7 – Howard Keel, actor and singer (b. 1919)
- November 9
  - Iris Chang, journalist (b. 1968)
  - Ed Kemmer, actor (b. 1920)
- November 13
  - Thomas M. Foglietta, lawyer and politician, United States Ambassador to Italy (b. 1928)
  - Ol' Dirty Bastard, rapper (b. 1968)
- November 18 – Robert Bacher, physicist (b. 1905)
- November 19 – Jesse Koochin, notable euthanasia victim (b. 1998)
- November 20 – Ancel Keys, nutritionist (b. 1904)
- November 29
  - John Drew Barrymore, actor (b. 1932)
  - Harry Danning, baseball player (b. 1911)

=== December ===
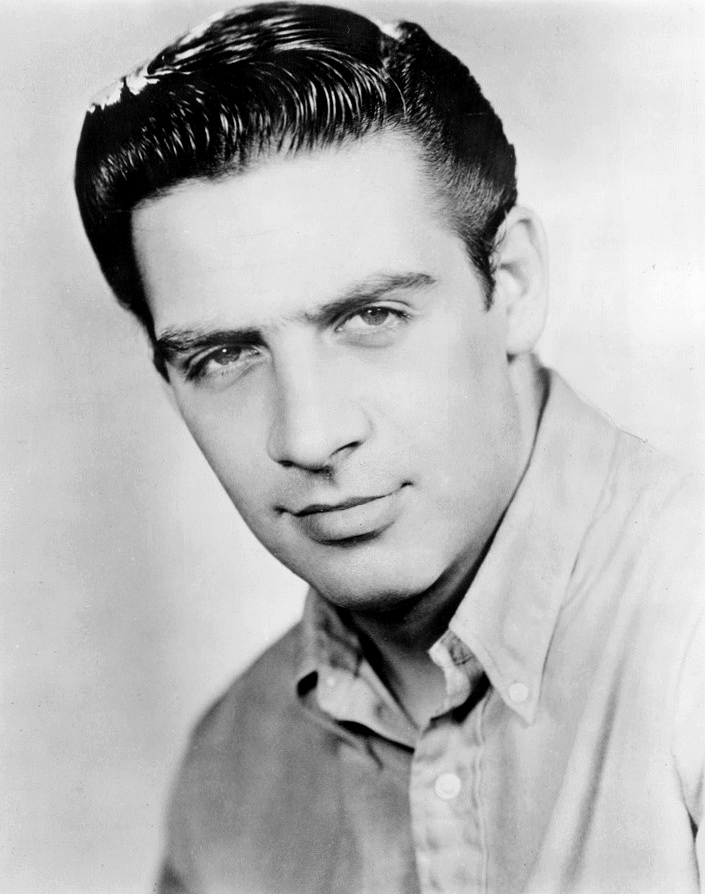
Jerry Orbach

- December 4
  - Thomas Reddin, American police officer (b. 1916)
  - Ron Williamson, American baseball player wrongly convicted of rape and murder (b. 1953)
- December 8 – Darrell Lance Abbott, American musician, songwriter and murder victim (b. 1966)
- December 18 – Srully Blotnick, American author and journalist (b. 1941)
- December 19 – Herbert C. Brown, English-born Nobel chemist (b. 1912)
- December 24 – Johnny Oates, American baseball player, coach, and manager (b. 1946)
- December 26 – Reggie White, American football player (b. 1961)
- December 28
  - Jerry Orbach, American actor and singer (b. 1935)
  - Susan Sontag, American writer and activist (b. 1933)
- December 29 – Julius Axelrod, American biochemist and academic, Nobel Prize laureate (b. 1912)
- December 30 – Artie Shaw, American musician (b. 1910)

== See also ==
- 2004 in American soccer
- 2004 in American television
- List of American films of 2004
