= Hanselman sextuplets =

American sextuplets (born 2004)

- Born: February 26, 2004 (age 22); Akron, Ohio

The Hanselman sextuplets (born February 26, 2004) are a set of sextuplets born to Jennifer and Keith Hanselman in Akron, Ohio, United States.

== Biography ==
The Hanselman sextuplets were born at Akron General Medical Center in Akron, Ohio on February 26, 2004, and are the first set of sextuplets to have been born in their state. Their parents, Jennifer and Keith Hanselman, live in Cuyahoga Falls, Ohio, and had a 2-year-old son at the time that the sextuplets were born. Jennifer, who formerly worked as an advertising copywriter, wrote a book about her experience of becoming a stay-at-home mother to seven young children in 2006, titled Party of Nine: The Triumphs and Traumas of Raising Sextuplets + One (ISBN 978-1424313464).

== The Children ==
The Hanselman sextuplets, with their weight at birth, are:

- Isabella Jean - 2 lb 10 oz
- Sophia Ivy - 1 lb 9 oz
- Kyle Allen - 2 lb 6 oz
- Logan James - 2 lb 8 oz
- Alex Edwin - 2 lb 8 oz
- Lucy Arlene - 2 lb 1 oz

The first baby to be sent home was Lucy and the last was Sophia. Kyle was diagnosed with autism.
