= Wyatt Borso =

American soccer player (born 2004)

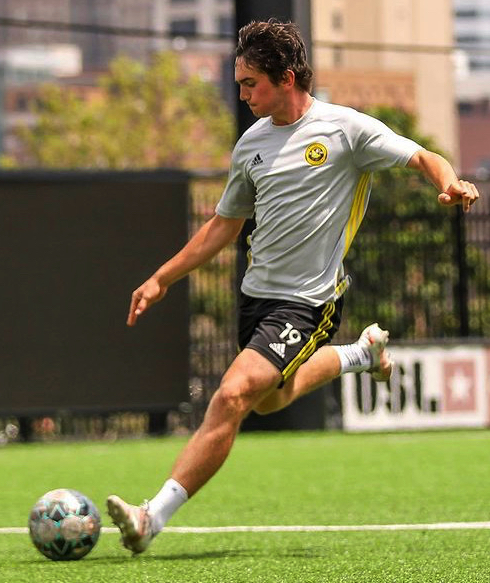

Personal information
- Date of birth: March 8, 2004 (age 22)
- Place of birth: Chicago, Illinois, United States
- Height: 1.85 m (6 ft 1 in)
- Positions: Winger; forward

Team information
- Current team: Pittsburgh Riverhounds
- Number: 19

Youth career
- 2018–2020: Chicago Fire

Senior career*
Years	Team	Apps	(Gls)
2021–2022	Pittsburgh Riverhounds	5	(0)
2022	→ Pittsburgh Riverhounds (loan)	2	(0)
- * Club domestic league appearances and goals as of November 5th, 2021

Wyatt Borso (born March 8, 2004, in Chicago, Illinois), is an American professional soccer player who played two seasons as a winger / forward for the USL Championship club Pittsburgh Riverhounds and currently with Oregon State University.

Borso is predominantly known for his speed, strength, and stamina, but also possesses good technique and ball control. His two footed skills, combined with his acceleration and physicality, allow him to get past defenders regularly and make runs into space, where he is able to score or create. In addition to his athletic and offensive capabilities, Borso has also drawn praise for his work-rate and defensive contribution off the ball. Soccerwire.com reports him right foot dominant. ESPN.com states his height at 6'1" and weight at 181 lbs.

== Pittsburgh Riverhounds ==
On April 19, 2021, Pittsburgh Riverhounds SC signed 17 years and 1 month old forward Wyatt Borso for the 2021 season. Borso's signing marked the first time the club has brought a player into its first team on a USL Academy contract. The USL referenced it "a historic signing in Pittsburgh".

He made his preseason pro debut on May 1, 2021, in the 75th minute against the Philadelphia Union II. He made his regular season pro debut on August 11, 2021, in a 3–2 loss to Miami FC. He made his first professional start on September 4, 2021, against San Antonio FC that ended in a 1–1 draw. Borso, a native of Aurora, Ill. was included in TopDrawerSoccer.com USL Championship: 10 Amateurs To Know, in which he was called "one of the most interesting additions in the USL offseason." After the end of the 2021 season, Borso was cited as one of the "Best 5 Moments of the Year".

He returned to Pittsburgh for his second season in 2022. After scoring multiple times in preseason off starts, Borso got an early regular season start on March 26, 2022, against Detroit City FC in 1–1 draw, where his shot required Save of the Week USL honors and setup corner for goal . His next start came April 5, 2022, in the Second Round of the US Open Cup where he played 90 minutes and assisted the second goal in a 2–0 win against Maryland Bobcats where "17-year-old Wyatt Borso drilled a cross the width of the pitch," according to TheCup.US "Wyatt Borso became the youngest player to record an assist for the Hounds (18 years, 28 days) when he hit a cross-field diagonal ball to Sims" according to USL Championship.com.

== Notre Dame Fighting Irish ==
As a Freshman, Wyatt played in all 17 games as a forward or midfielder during his rookie season in South Bend. Made his collegiate start in the season opener against Seattle and earned 12 starts as a freshman. Recorded his first career assist in the win over Michigan. Scored his first goal in win against Boston College. Missed the majority of sophomore season with injury after off season surgery. Medically red shirted his junior season, he led his team in goals his senior season and was eighth in the ACC for ACC goal production.

== Oregon State Beavers ==
As a Senior, in 2026 Wyatt captained the Oregon State team. He led the Pac Twelve conference in goals score, and is currently ranked second in the nation in goals scored in NCAA men soccer.

== Biography ==
Borso began his youth career with Chicago Sockers FC (Ill.) before moving to the Chicago Fire FC Academy in the 2018–19 season. He was also called up to U15 youth camps in Chula Vista, CA for the United States Men's National Soccer Team. In Pittsburgh, he received first team experience in the USL Championship while maintaining amateur NCAA eligibility. A Notre Dame recruit, Borso was rated a four-star prospect and one of the top 10 forwards in the Class of 2022 by TopDrawerSoccer.com.

Wyatt is the brother of Dylan Borso who plays in the MLS for the Chicago Fire.
