= Murder of Neveah Gallegos =

2007 child murder in Denver, Colorado

Neveah Gallegos
- Born: Neveah Janey Gallegos; August 1, 2004
- Died: September 21, 2007 (aged 3); Denver, Colorado
- Known for: Child who was abused and murdered

Neveah Janey Gallegos (August 1, 2004 – September 21, 2007) was a child in Denver, Colorado who was murdered by her mother's live-in boyfriend. After her death, Denver's Department of Human Services said that they would make improvements to their agency.

== Death ==
On September 21, 2007, the Denver Police Department received a 911 call from Miriam Gallegos, the mother of Neveah. She claimed that her daughter had been kidnapped, having been snatched from her arms. Gallegos gave a description of the supposed kidnapper and the car he was in, adding that he was the passenger and that she was unable to see the driver. Gallegos gave police permission to enter her apartment in order for them to obtain a photograph of her daughter to aid them in their search. Once inside the apartment police noticed a "paper towel on the floor of the living room that had blood or some other type of bodily fluid on it".

Later that day, Gallegos agreed to answer questions from the police. She told them she had received a telephone call at work, the same day as she made the 911 call. The call was from her boyfriend who she named as Angel Montoya. He told her to come home but did not explain why. Gallegos left work and walked home. When she entered her apartment she discovered her daughter, Neveah, who was not breathing. She claimed she had tried to "put air into Neveah" but was unable to revive her. She informed the police that she and Montoya decided not to call an ambulance but instead opted to put Neveah's corpse into a "white trash bag", which they then put inside a "black trash bag", and placed the bagged body into a duffel bag. She claimed that she and Montoya left the building and he, with the duffel bag, went a different way. During the interview police showed Gallegos a photo of Montoya, whose full name is Angel Ray Montoya. She confirmed the photograph was of him.

Neveah, dressed in red sweat pants, a red shirt with a cartoon character on it and pink tennis shoes, was found on September 24, 2007, three days after being reported missing, in a white plastic trash bag under a tree stump in a ravine. She was found roughly 2 miles (3.2 km) from the couple's apartment. At the time cause of death was undetermined, though it was later determined to be asphyxiation. On September 25, 2007, a candlelight vigil was held for her, with dozens of people placing flowers and stuffed toys in the ravine where Neveah was found. A permanent memorial was dedicated to Neveah on November 2, 2007.

== Angel Ray Montoya ==
Montoya was born on January 19, 1985. In December 2000, he was charged with indecent exposure to minors. In 2003, he failed to register as a sex offender and was charged with a misdemeanor to which he pleaded guilty. In 2005, he was charged with false imprisonment and child abuse, which he pleaded down to one count of misdemeanor child abuse. He was given a 270-day jail sentence that was suspended and 18 months of supervised probation. Officials had also expressed concerns about Montoya living with his niece and nephew, aged one and three, at his mother’s house but did not follow through with the concerns.

== Miriam Gallegos ==
Miriam Gallegos also has a criminal history, having been convicted on marijuana charges in 2006.

== Criminal proceedings ==
Montoya had previously been investigated in July 2006 for sexual assault that involved vaginal penetration on Neveah, then 23 months old. But the case was subsequently dropped due to Miriam Gallegos not cooperating with detectives. Subsequent to Neveah's death, Angel Ray Montoya was arrested for first-degree murder. Miriam Gallegos was arrested on charges of being an accessory to murder, false reporting, and fatal child abuse. The couple was released October 1, 2007 without being charged pending an autopsy. Montoya was again arrested in late October 2007 for failing to register as a sex offender. A news report from March 2008 stated that Montoya had again failed to register and was on the run. Neveah's grandmother, Janet Gallegos, having grown frustrated with the lack of arrest of Angel Montoya and her daughter Miriam, reached out to attorney/author Donna Thomas for help in procuring justice for Neveah. Thomas had a grand jury convened. On April 22, 2009, Montoya and Miriam Gallegos were indicted for Neveah's death. Montoya was indicted on one count of first-degree murder and child abuse resulting in death. Gallegos was indicted May 6, 2009, on one count of child abuse resulting in death and being an accessory to a crime. Montoya, already in custody on another charge when indicted for Neveah's death, was being held in jail without bond, and Gallegos was being held on $500,000 bond. Prosecutors considered seeking the death penalty. On October 30, 2009, Montoya and Miriam Gallegos both pleaded not guilty in Neveah's death. On January 6, 2011, Miriam Gallegos was sentenced to 12 years in prison and five years of parole for child abuse resulting in death. On May 15, 2012, Angel Montoya was sentenced to life in prison without the possibility of parole for first-degree murder, child abuse resulting in death and abuse of a corpse.

== Appeal ==
Montoya appealed his first degree murder conviction. The Colorado Court of Appeals upheld his conviction on 20 August 2015.
