= Steve Wayne =

American actor

Steve Wayne (1920 – September 5, 2004) was an American film and television actor appearing in movies and commercials for products such as Alka-Seltzer, Wheaties and Ocean Spray.

Wayne was born Norman Weinberger. He had two brothers. He lived on Payson Street in Baltimore, Maryland and grew up in the same neighborhood as professional boxer Jack Portnoy.

He traveled to Hollywood, California with the dream of an acting career. From 1944 to 1957, Wayne appeared in 27 movies and T.V. programs. Among his most noted films were Bedtime for Bonzo with Ronald Reagan, The Sands of Two Jima with John Wayne, and Stalag 17 with William Holden.

In 1979 Wayne noticed that music groups were plastering fliers over "No Smoking" and "Fire Area" signs in his heavily wooded Laurel Canyon neighborhood, not far from the site of a major fire that had destroyed homes. For the next 2 decades, Wayne tore down thousands of illegal fliers all over Los Angeles County

"If everybody just takes down one sign a week, we could clean up Los Angeles easily," he said. He kept at it nearly up to the day he died, stopping to rip down signs "even when coming home from his chemo appointments," said his daughter, Cathy Wayne.

Wayne was married to Nancy and had one child. She died in 1999, and he died on September 5, 2004, in Los Angeles, California of cancer; he was 84 years old.
