= Jenna Hutchins =

American long-distance runner

Personal information
- Born: March 25, 2004 (age 22) Johnson City, Tennessee, U.S.
- Height: 5 ft 3 in (1.60 m)

Sport
- Sport: Track and field, cross country
- Event(s): 1500 m, 3000 m, 3200 m, 5000 m, 10000 m, cross country
- College team: BYU Cougars

Jenna Hutchins (born March 25, 2004) is an American long distance runner for the BYU Cougars. She was named NCAA First Team All-American in the 10,000m and All-Big 12 in the 5000m in 2024.

Prior to college, Hutchins was twice named Tennessee Gatorade Athlete of the Year in track & field and cross country (2020, 2019). She holds Tennessee state records in the mile (4:43) and 1600m (4:44), and set an American U20 national record in the 5000m (15:34) — the first-ever high school girls' cross-country 5,000 in less than 16 minutes.

In October 2024, Hutchins signed an NIL deal with Nike.
