= David Lipschultz =

American journalist

- Born: June 2, 1970
- Died: January 3, 2004 (aged 33); Aspen, Colorado, U.S.
- Occupation: Freelance journalist
- Spouse: Juliana Tauber (m. 2002)

David Bernard Lipschultz (June 2, 1970 – January 3, 2004) was an American freelance journalist. His work appeared in The New York Times, Smart Money, and USA Today as well as such high tech magazines as Wired, Red Herring, and Internet World.

== Career ==
Lipschultz and his wife wrote, produced, and hosted "The Week in Aspen" on Channel 16. The show covered nightlife and entertainment in Aspen. His work focused mainly on entertainment and business. Prior to being a journalist, he lived in New York City and worked in marketing and public relations.

== Family ==
Lipschultz married Juliana Tauber in October 2002. The two met on a ski-lift in Aspen.

== Death ==
He died in a skiing accident, falling into a tree well, in Aspen, Colorado, in 2004 at age 33.
