= Shadowville Productions =

- Parent company: Shadowville Inc.
- Founded: August 2004
- Genre: Hip hop, Pop, R&B
- Country of origin: U.S.
- Location: Brooklyn, New York, United States
- Official website: Shadowville.com

Shadowville Productions is a music production, content filtering and licensing business of Shadowville Inc., that distributes instrumentals from several independent producers, providing original music for artists or companies in need of beats. The business is a registered ASCAP member as a publisher.

The New York company was incorporated in September 2006 and provides web platforms and online artist management for music producers and beat composers. It is recognized as an early player in the commercialization of "beat licensing" of instrumentals to aspiring vocalists through the World Wide Web.

Shadowville has had over 30 million song plays worldwide on the internet according to their Soundclick statistics.

== History ==
Shadowville Productions was founded in 2004 by producer Slantize. While still attending university, Slantize produced his first few hip hop instrumentals with a Yamaha RM1x in 2003 and listed them on Soundclick to be showcased. After unexpectedly being approached with an offer to buy his first beat for fifty US dollars, Slantize began to produce beats specifically for sale. He met fellow Soundclick beat makers ADP and Hala-X and formed Shadowville Productions and, after being inspired by his first sale as well as a small pool of amateur producers offering to also sell their works, Slantize began to market their beats in a professional manner, including with modern web design, legally enforceable license contracts, and industry-quality sounding works, specifically to be licensed out—contrary to the flood of noticeably amateur sounding works on Soundclick at the time. Eventually, software-based production tool FL Studio, then known as Fruity Loops, became the primary tool for members of Shadowville. After gaining significant traffic and sales through Soundclick, Shadowville Productions was incorporated in the state of New York as Shadowville Inc. in August 2006 with a campaign to offer non-exclusive licenses (leases) as the norm, rather than exclusive, one-time-sale licenses. This was achieved by raising exclusive rights pricing while lowering non-exclusive rights pricing. Its own commercial website accumulated heavy traffic and, next to Soundclick, became the de facto website to download free beats on the internet.

== Credentials ==
=== Artists ===
- Da Muzicianz - Da Muzicianz
- Kurupt featuring Patriarch - Gangsta & Politiks
- The Outlawz featuring Patriarch - Streets Got Our Kids
- Dead Prez featuring Patriarch - Don't Let 'Em
- South Park Mexican - Swim
- South Park Mexican - The Dope House Mind
- South Park Mexican - Jackers In My Home
- South Park Mexican - Dead Pictures

=== Companies ===
- Club Jenna
- Top Notch Records
- Town & Country Surf Designs
- Fox Sports Net

== Controversy ==
It has been reported that Partysquad on Universal Music in the Netherlands has unauthorized use of a beat by Shadowville producer Slantize on the track 'We Gaan Los' on the album 'De Bazen van de Club'. Partysquad has claimed to not have been aware of this.

== Producers ==
- Slantize
- ADP
- Hala-X
- Smoke
- 2Deep
- Sean Divine
- The Unbeatables
- Adamack
- Nine Diamond
- Tristan
- Allrounda
- Atomic Beats
- Beatg33kz
- Don Coda
- Dansonn
- Evelution
- Ear 2 Tha Beat
- Marsad Men
- NIME FIVE
