= 1937 in the United States =

- Decades: 1910s; 1920s; 1930s; 1940s; 1950s
- See also: History of the United States (1918–1945); Timeline of United States history (1930–1949); List of years in the United States

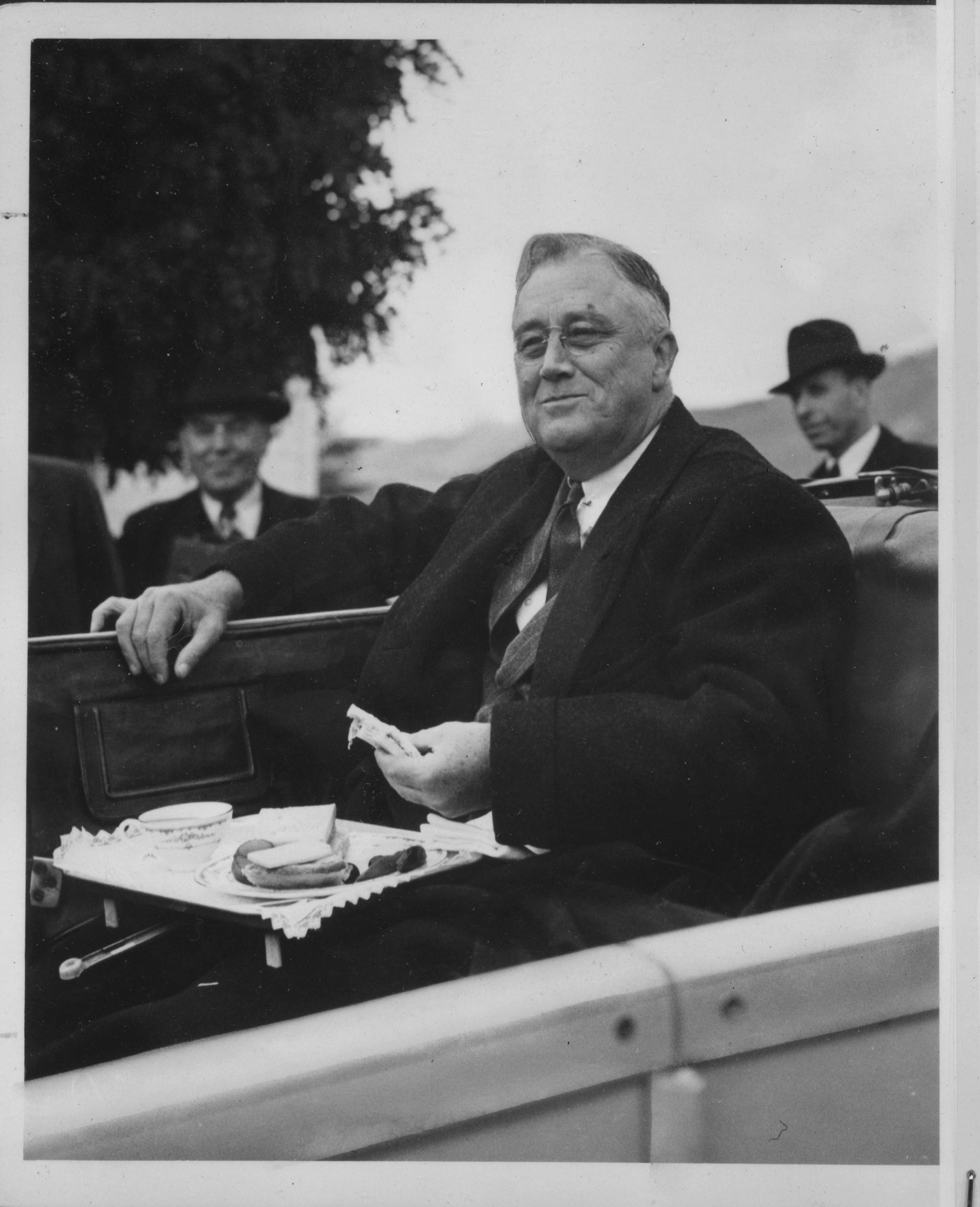
President Roosevelt at the Grand Coulee Dam in Washington, 1937

Events from the year 1937 in the United States.

== Incumbents ==
=== Federal government ===
- President: Franklin D. Roosevelt (D-New York)
- Vice President: John Nance Garner (D-Texas)
- Chief Justice: Charles Evans Hughes (New York)
- Speaker of the House of Representatives: William B. Bankhead (D-Alabama)
- Senate Majority Leader:

Joseph Taylor Robinson (D-Arkansas) (until July 14)
Alben W. Barkley (D-Kentucky) (starting July 22)

- Congress: 74th (until January 3), 75th (starting January 3)

==== State governments ====
Governors and lieutenant governors

=== Governors ===
- Governor of Alabama: Bibb Graves (Democratic)
- Governor of Arizona: Benjamin Baker Moeur (Democratic) (until January 4), Rawghlie Clement Stanford (Democratic) (starting January 4)
- Governor of Arkansas: Junius Marion Futrell (Democratic) (until January 12), Carl Edward Bailey (Democratic) (starting January 12)
- Governor of California: Frank Merriam (Republican)
- Governor of Colorado:
  - until January 1: Edwin C. Johnson (Democratic)
  - January 1-12: Ray Herbert Talbot (Democratic)
  - starting January 12: Teller Ammons (Democratic)
- Governor of Connecticut: Wilbur Lucius Cross (Democratic)
- Governor of Delaware: C. Douglass Buck (Republican) (until January 19), Richard C. McMullen (Democratic) (starting January 19)
- Governor of Florida: David Sholtz (Democratic) (until January 5), Fred P. Cone (Democratic) (starting January 5)
- Governor of Georgia: Eugene Talmadge (Democratic) (until January 12), Eurith D. Rivers (Democratic) (starting January 12)
- Governor of Idaho: C. Ben Ross (Democratic) (until January 4), Barzilla W. Clark (Democratic) (starting January 4)
- Governor of Illinois: Henry Horner (Democratic)
- Governor of Indiana: Paul V. McNutt (Democratic) (until January 11), M. Clifford Townsend (Democratic) (starting January 11)
- Governor of Iowa: Clyde L. Herring (Democratic) (until January 14), Nelson G. Kraschel (Democratic) (starting January 14)
- Governor of Kansas: Alfred M. Landon (Republican) (until January 11), Walter A. Huxman (Democratic) (starting January 11)
- Governor of Kentucky: Happy Chandler (Democratic)
- Governor of Louisiana: Richard W. Leche (Democratic)
- Governor of Maine: Louis J. Brann (Democratic) (until January 6), Lewis O. Barrows (Republican) (starting January 6)
- Governor of Maryland: Harry W. Nice (Republican)
- Governor of Massachusetts: James Michael Curley (Democratic) (until January 7), Charles F. Hurley (Democratic) (starting January 7)
- Governor of Michigan: Frank Fitzgerald (Republican) (until January 1), Frank Murphy (Democratic) (starting January 1)
- Governor of Minnesota: Hjalmar Petersen (Farmer-Labor) (until January 4), Elmer A. Benson (Farmer-Labor) (starting January 4)
- Governor of Mississippi: Hugh L. White (Democratic)
- Governor of Missouri: Guy Brasfield Park (Democratic) (until January 11), Lloyd C. Stark (Democratic) (starting January 11)
- Governor of Montana: Elmer Holt (Democratic) (until January 4), Roy E. Ayers (Democratic) (starting January 4)
- Governor of Nebraska: Robert Leroy Cochran (Democratic)
- Governor of Nevada: Richard Kirman, Sr. (Democratic)
- Governor of New Hampshire: Styles Bridges (Republican) (until January 7), Francis P. Murphy (Republican) (starting January 7)
- Governor of New Jersey: Harold G. Hoffman (Republican)
- Governor of New Mexico: Clyde Tingley (Democratic)
- Governor of New York: Herbert H. Lehman (Democratic)
- Governor of North Carolina: John C. B. Ehringhaus (Democratic) (until January 7), Clyde R. Hoey (Democratic) (starting January 7)
- Governor of North Dakota: Walter Welford (Republican) (until January 6), William Langer (Republican) (starting January 6)
- Governor of Ohio: Martin L. Davey (Democratic)
- Governor of Oklahoma: Ernest W. Marland (Democratic)
- Governor of Oregon: Charles H. Martin (Democratic)
- Governor of Pennsylvania: George Howard Earle III (Democratic)
- Governor of Rhode Island: Theodore Francis Green (Democratic) (until January 5), Robert E. Quinn (Democratic) (starting January 2)
- Governor of South Carolina: Olin D. Johnston (Democratic)
- Governor of South Dakota: Tom Berry (Democratic) (until January 5), Leslie Jensen (Republican) (starting January 5)
- Governor of Tennessee: Harry Hill McAlister (Democratic) (until January 15), Gordon Browning (Democratic) (starting January 15)
- Governor of Texas: James V. Allred (Democratic)
- Governor of Utah: Henry H. Blood (Democratic)
- Governor of Vermont: Charles M. Smith (Republican) (until January 7), George David Aiken (Republican) (starting January 7)
- Governor of Virginia: George C. Peery (Democratic)
- Governor of Washington: Clarence D. Martin (Democratic)
- Governor of West Virginia: Herman G. Kump (Democratic) (until January 18), Homer A. Holt (Democratic) (starting January 18)
- Governor of Wisconsin: Philip La Follette (Wisconsin Progressive)
- Governor of Wyoming: Leslie A. Miller (Democratic)

=== Lieutenant governors ===
- Lieutenant Governor of Alabama: Thomas E. Knight (Democratic)
- Lieutenant Governor of Arkansas: William Lee Cazort (Democratic) (until month and day unknown), Robert L. Bailey (Democratic) (starting month and day unknown)
- Lieutenant Governor of California: George J. Hatfield (Republican)
- Lieutenant Governor of Colorado: Raymond Herbert Talbot (Democratic) (until January 1), Frank J. Hayes (Democratic) (starting January 1)
- Lieutenant Governor of Connecticut: T. Frank Hayes (Democratic)
- Lieutenant Governor of Delaware: Roy F. Corley (Republican) (until January 19), Edward W. Cooch (Democratic) (starting January 19)
- Lieutenant Governor of Idaho: G. P. Mix (Democratic) (until January 3), Charles C. Gossett (Democratic) (starting January 3)
- Lieutenant Governor of Illinois: Thomas Donovan (Democratic) (until January 4), John H. Stelle (Democratic) (starting January 4)
- Lieutenant Governor of Indiana: M. Clifford Townsend (Democratic) (until January 11), Henry F. Schricker (Democratic) (starting January 11)
- Lieutenant Governor of Iowa: Nelson G. Kraschel (Democratic) (until January 14), John K. Valentine (Democratic) (starting January 14)
- Lieutenant Governor of Kansas: Charles W. Thompson (Republican) (until month and day unknown), William M. Lindsay (Democratic) (starting month and day unknown)
- Lieutenant Governor of Kentucky: Keen Johnson (Democratic)
- Lieutenant Governor of Louisiana: Earl K. Long (Democratic)
- Lieutenant Governor of Massachusetts: Joseph L. Hurley (Democratic) (until January 7), Francis E. Kelly (Democratic) (starting January 7)
- Lieutenant Governor of Michigan:
  - until January 1: Thomas Read (Democratic)
  - January 1-5: vacant
  - starting January 5: Leo J. Nowicki (Democratic)
- Lieutenant Governor of Minnesota: William B. Richardson (Republican) (until January 4), Gottfrid Lindsten (Republican) (starting January 4)
- Lieutenant Governor of Mississippi: Jacob Buehler Snider (Democratic)
- Lieutenant Governor of Missouri: Frank Gaines Harris (Democratic)
- Lieutenant Governor of Montana: William P. Pilgeram (Democratic) (until month and day unknown), Hugh R. Adair (political party unknown) (starting month and day unknown)
- Lieutenant Governor of Nebraska: Walter H. Jurgensen (Democratic)
- Lieutenant Governor of Nevada: Fred S. Alward (political party unknown)
- Lieutenant Governor of New Mexico: Louis Cabeza de Baca (Democratic) (until January 1), Hiram M. Dow (Democratic) (starting January 1)
- Lieutenant Governor of New York: M. William Bray (Democratic)
- Lieutenant Governor of North Carolina: Alexander H. Graham (Democratic) (until January 7), Wilkins P. Horton (Democratic) (starting January 7)
- Lieutenant Governor of North Dakota: vacant (until January 6), Thorstein H. H. Thoresen (Republican) (starting January 6)
- Lieutenant Governor of Ohio: Harold G. Mosier (Democratic) (until January 11), Paul P. Yoder (Democratic) (starting January 11)
- Lieutenant Governor of Oklahoma: James E. Berry (Democratic)
- Lieutenant Governor of Pennsylvania: Thomas Kennedy (Democratic)
- Lieutenant Governor of Rhode Island: Robert E. Quinn (Democratic) (until January 5), Raymond E. Jordan (Democratic) (starting January 5)
- Lieutenant Governor of South Carolina: Joseph Emile Harley (Democratic)
- Lieutenant Governor of South Dakota: Robert Peterson (Democratic) (until January 5), Donald McMurchie (Republican) (starting January 5)
- Lieutenant Governor of Tennessee: Bryan Pope (Democratic)
- Lieutenant Governor of Texas: Walter Frank Woodul (Democratic)
- Lieutenant Governor of Vermont: George D. Aiken (Republican) (until January 7), William H. Wills (Republican) (starting January 7)
- Lieutenant Governor of Virginia: James H. Price (Democratic)
- Lieutenant Governor of Washington: Victor A. Meyers (Democratic)
- Lieutenant Governor of Wisconsin:
  - until January 4: vacant
  - January 4-October 16: Henry A. Gunderson (Progressive)
  - starting October 16: vacant

== Events ==
=== January–March ===
- January 11 – The first issue of Look magazine goes on sale.
- January 12 – Adventurer and filmmaker Martin Johnson, of Martin and Osa Johnson fame, is killed along with four others in the crash of Western Air Express Flight 7 in mountainous terrain near Saugus, California.
- January 19
  - Howard Hughes sets a new record by flying from Los Angeles to New York City in 7 hours, 28 minutes and 25 seconds.
  - Marriage of Charlie Johns and Eunice Winstead: A 22-year-old Tennessee farmer marries his 9-year-old neighbour. Media publicity leads to Tennessee (and other states) introducing minimum marriage age laws.
- January 20 – Chief Justice Charles Evans Hughes swears in Franklin D. Roosevelt for a second term as President of the United States. This is the first time Inauguration Day in the United States occurs on this date, in response to the ratification in 1933 of the 20th amendment to the U.S. Constitution. Inauguration has occurred on January 20 ever since. John Nance Garner is sworn in for a second term as Vice President of the United States.
- January 26 – Michigan celebrates its Centennial Anniversary of statehood.
- January 31 – The Ohio River flood kills 385 people and leaves one million homeless. Property losses reach $500 million ($10.2 billion when adjusted for inflation as of September 2022).
- February 5 – President Franklin D. Roosevelt proposes a plan to enlarge the Supreme Court of the United States.
- February 6 – John Steinbeck's novella of the Great Depression Of Mice and Men is published.
- February 11 – A sit-down strike ends when General Motors recognizes the United Automobile Workers Union.
- February 15 – Life magazine publishes the photograph At the Time of the Louisville Flood by Margaret Bourke-White, depicting black victims of the Ohio River flood.
- February 16 – Wallace H. Carothers receives a patent for nylon.
- March 2 – The Steel Workers Organizing Committee, precursor to United Steelworkers, signs a collective bargaining agreement with U.S. Steel.
- March 4 – The 9th Academy Awards, hosted by George Jessel, are presented at the Biltmore Hotel in Los Angeles, with Robert Z. Leonard's The Great Ziegfeld winning the Outstanding Production. The film is among two others (being Mervyn LeRoy's Anthony Adverse and William Wyler's Dodsworth) to receive the most nominations with seven, while Anthony Adverse wins the most awards with four. Frank Capra receives his second Best Director award for Mr. Deeds Goes to Town.
- March 17 – The Atherton Report (private investigator Edwin Atherton's report detailing vice and police corruption in San Francisco) is released.
- March 18
  - In the worst school disaster in American history in terms of lives lost, the New London School in New London, Texas suffers a catastrophic natural gas explosion, killing in excess of 295 students and teachers.
  - Mother Frances Hospital opens in Tyler, Texas in response to the New London School explosion.
- March 26
  - In Crystal City, Texas, spinach growers erect a statue of the cartoon character Popeye.
  - William Henry Hastie becomes the first African-American appointed to a federal judgeship.
- March 28 – Sculptor Robert George Irwin kills three people in Turtle Bay, Manhattan.
- March – The first issue of the comic book Detective Comics is published. Twenty-seven issues later, Detective Comics introduces Batman. The comic goes on to become the longest continually published comic magazine in American history; it is still published as of 2024.

=== April–June ===
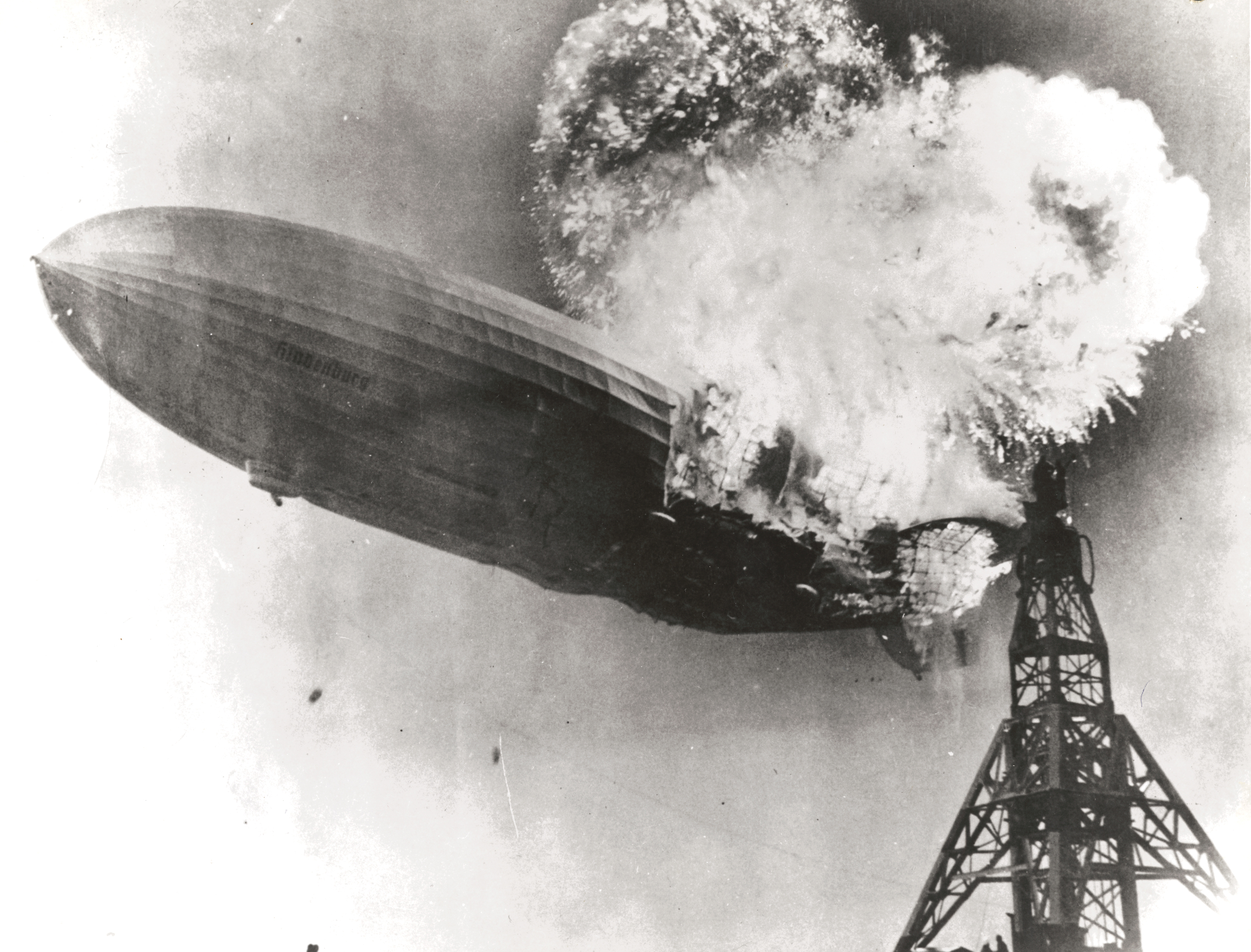
May 6: Hindenburg disaster

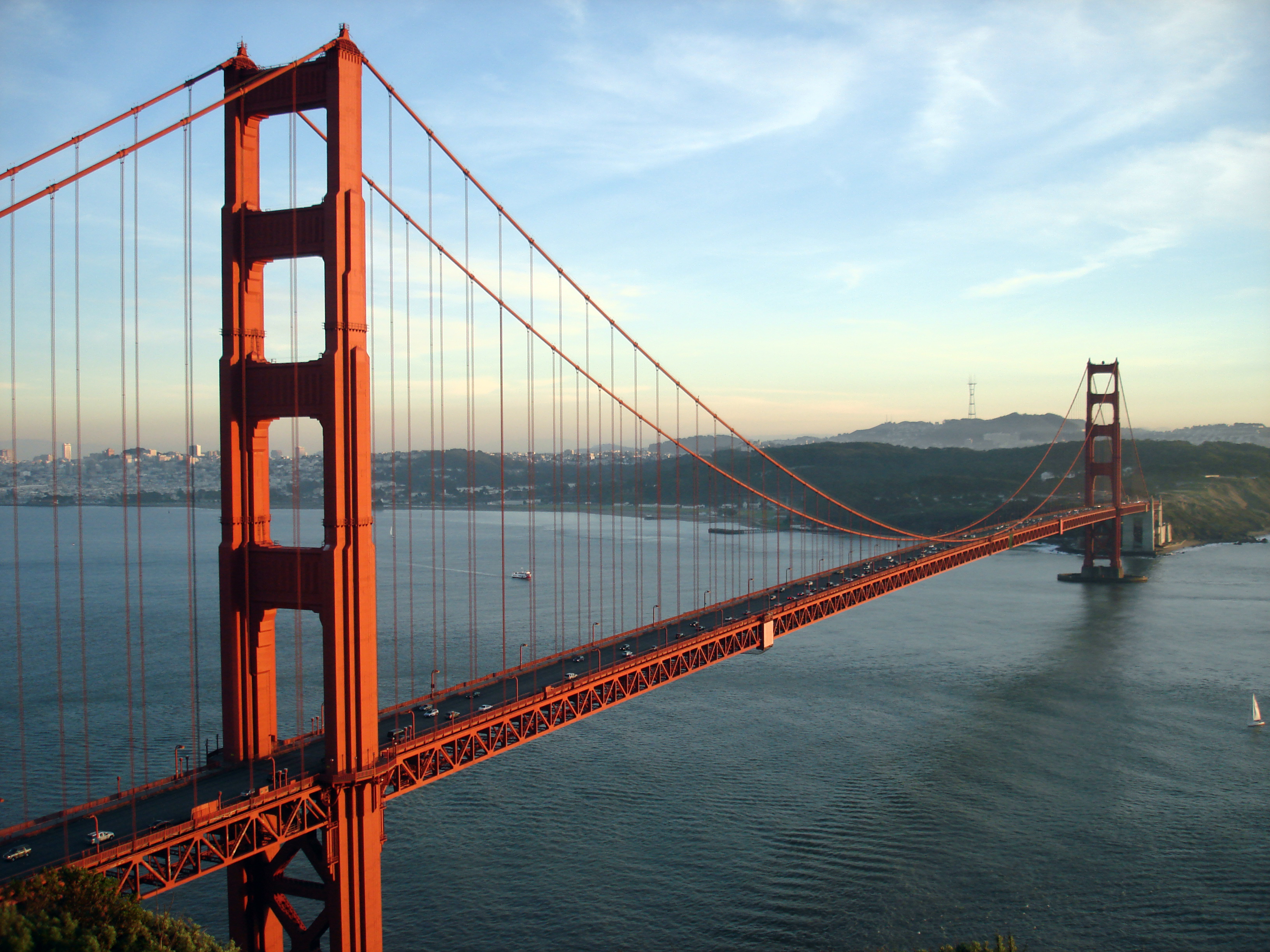
May 27: The Golden Gate Bridge opens

- April 12 – National Labor Relations Board v. Jones & Laughlin Steel Corporation: The Supreme Court of the United States rules that the National Labor Relations Act is constitutional.
- April 13 – Organ Pipe Cactus National Monument is established.
- April 17 – The animated short Porky's Duck Hunt, directed by Tex Avery for the Looney Tunes series, featuring the debut of Daffy Duck, is released.
- May – 7 million unemployed in the US.
- May 6 – Hindenburg disaster: The German airship Hindenburg bursts into flame when mooring to a mast in Lakehurst, New Jersey.
- May 7 – An enquiry begins into the Hindenburg disaster.
- May 27 – In California, the Golden Gate Bridge opens to pedestrian traffic, creating a vital link between San Francisco and Marin County. The next day, President Franklin D. Roosevelt pushes a button in Washington, D.C., signaling the start of vehicle traffic over the Golden Gate Bridge.
- May 30 – Memorial Day massacre: the Chicago Police Department shoots and kills ten unarmed demonstrators during the Little Steel strike.
- June 14 – Pennsylvania becomes the first (and only) of the United States to celebrate Flag Day officially as a state holiday.
- June 20 – The first transpolar flight in history successfully arrives at Vancouver, Washington.
- June 24 – The U.S. Navy's first two fast battleships, North Carolina and Washington, are ordered from the New York and Philadelphia Naval Shipyards, respectively.
- June 25 – In The Bronx, an extended Orchard Beach recreation area opens, turning Hunter Island into a peninsula.

=== July–September ===
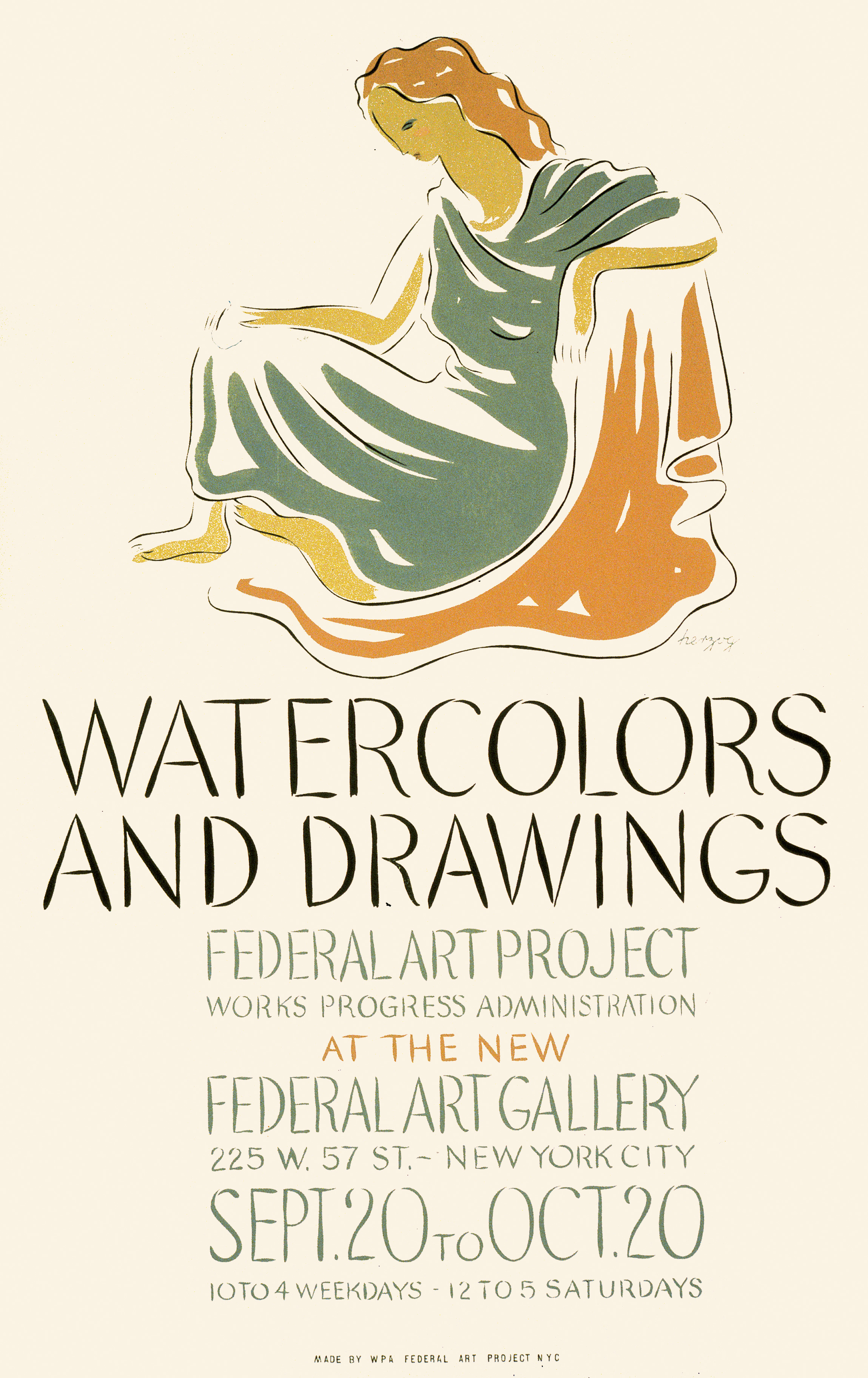
September 20: The Federal Art Project opens a Watercolors and Drawings show at the new Federal Art Gallery, NYC

- July 2
  - Amelia Earhart and navigator Fred Noonan disappear after taking off from New Guinea during Earhart's attempt to become the first woman to fly around the world.
  - A guard first stands post at the Tomb of the Unknowns in Washington, D.C.; continuous guard is maintained here from this time forward.
- July 4 – The Lost Colony historical drama is first performed in an outdoor theater in the location where it is set, Roanoke Island, North Carolina.
- July 5 – The canned precooked meat product Spam is introduced by the Hormel company.
- July 14 – The Transpolar flight of Gromov, Yumashev and Danilin lands near San Jacinto, California, establishing a world record for nonstop straight-line flight distance of 10,148.5 km (6,306.0 mi, from Moscow).
- July 22 – New Deal: The United States Senate votes down President Franklin D. Roosevelt's proposal to add more justices to the Supreme Court of the United States.
- July 24 – Alabama drops rape charges against some of the "Scottsboro Boys".
- September 7 – CBS broadcasts a two-and-a-half hour memorial concert nationwide on radio in memory of George Gershwin, live from the Hollywood Bowl. Many celebrities appear, including Oscar Levant, Fred Astaire, Otto Klemperer, Lily Pons, and members of the original cast of Porgy and Bess. The concert is recorded and released complete years later in what is excellent sound for its time, on CD. The Los Angeles Philharmonic is the featured orchestra.
- September 18 – African American writer Zora Neale Hurston publishes her novel Their Eyes Were Watching God.
- September 20 – Aircraft carrier USS Yorktown is commissioned.
- September 26 – Street & Smith launches a half-hour radio program, The Shadow, with Orson Welles in the title role.

=== October–December ===
- October 1
  - The Marijuana Tax Act becomes law in the United States.
  - U.S. Supreme Court associate justice Hugo Black, in a nationwide radio broadcast, refutes allegations of past involvement in the Ku Klux Klan.
- October 5 – Roosevelt gives his famous Quarantine Speech in Chicago.
- October 10 – The New York Yankees defeat the New York Giants (baseball), 4 games to 1, to win their 6th World Series Title.
- October 15 – Ernest Hemingway's novel To Have and Have Not is first published.
- November 11 – The Mercury Theatre is launched on Broadway in New York City with an acclaimed production of Caesar, Marlon Brando's adaptation of Shakespeare's Julius Caesar in a modern-dress bare-stage anti-fascist presentation.
- December 12
  - Panay incident: Japanese bombers sink the American gunboat USS Panay on the Yangtze in China; the US accepts the Japanese statement that this was unintentional.
  - Mae West makes a risque guest appearance on the NBC Chase and Sanborn Hour that eventually results in her being banned from radio.
- December 21 – Walt Disney's Snow White and the Seven Dwarfs, the first feature-length animated cartoon with sound, is premiered and becomes a smash hit.
- December 22 – The Lincoln Tunnel, connecting New York City to Weehawken, New Jersey, under the Hudson River opens to road traffic.
- December 25 – At the age of 70, conductor Arturo Toscanini conducts the NBC Symphony Orchestra on radio for the first time, beginning his successful 17-year tenure with that orchestra. This first concert consists of music by Vivaldi (at a time when he is still seldom played), Mozart, and Brahms. Millions tune in to listen, including U.S. President Franklin D. Roosevelt.

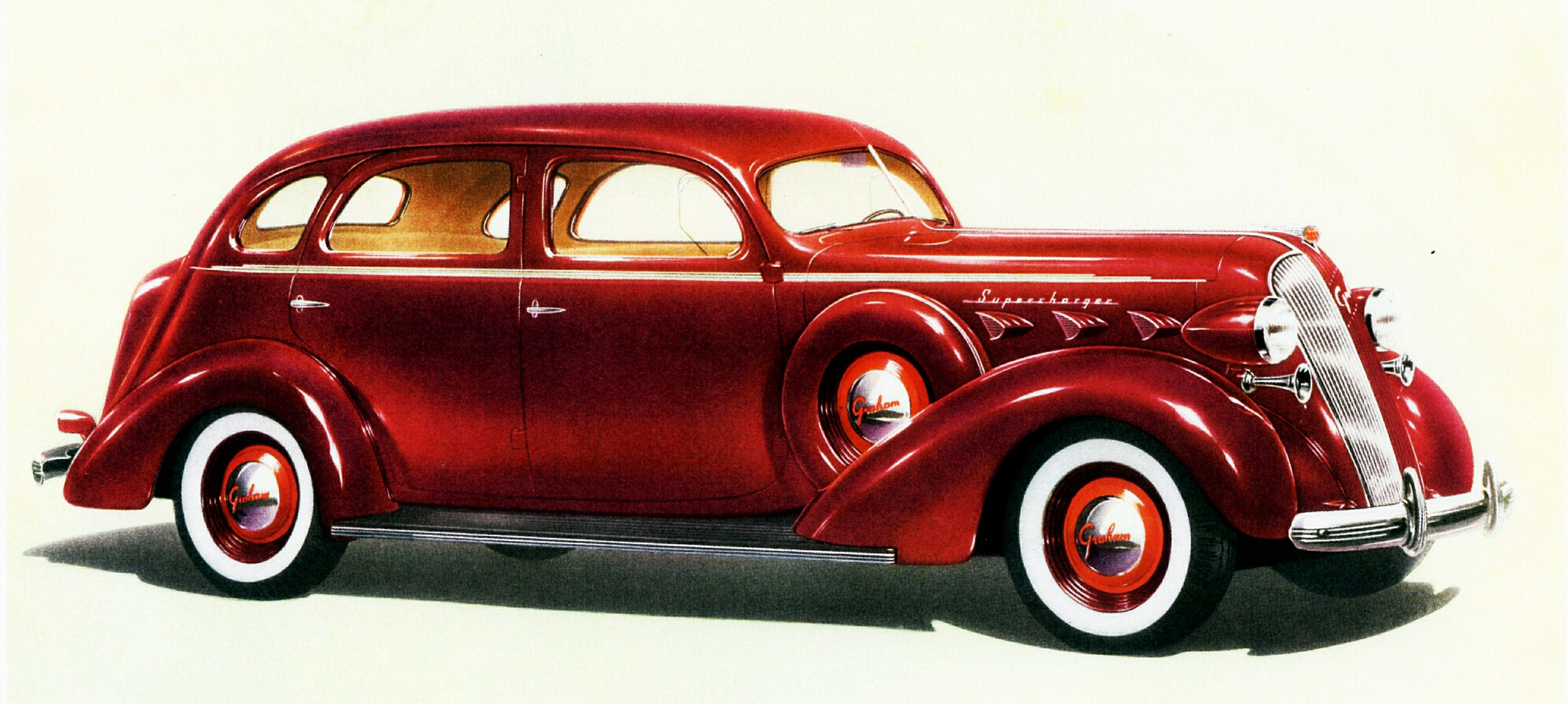
Advertisement for 1937 Graham Custom Series 120 Supercharger Four-door Sedan

=== Undated ===
- Napoleon Hill's self-help book Think and Grow Rich is published.

=== Ongoing ===
- Lochner era (c. 1897–c. 1937)
- New Deal (1933–1939)
- Recession of 1937–1938 (1937–1938)

== Births ==
=== January ===
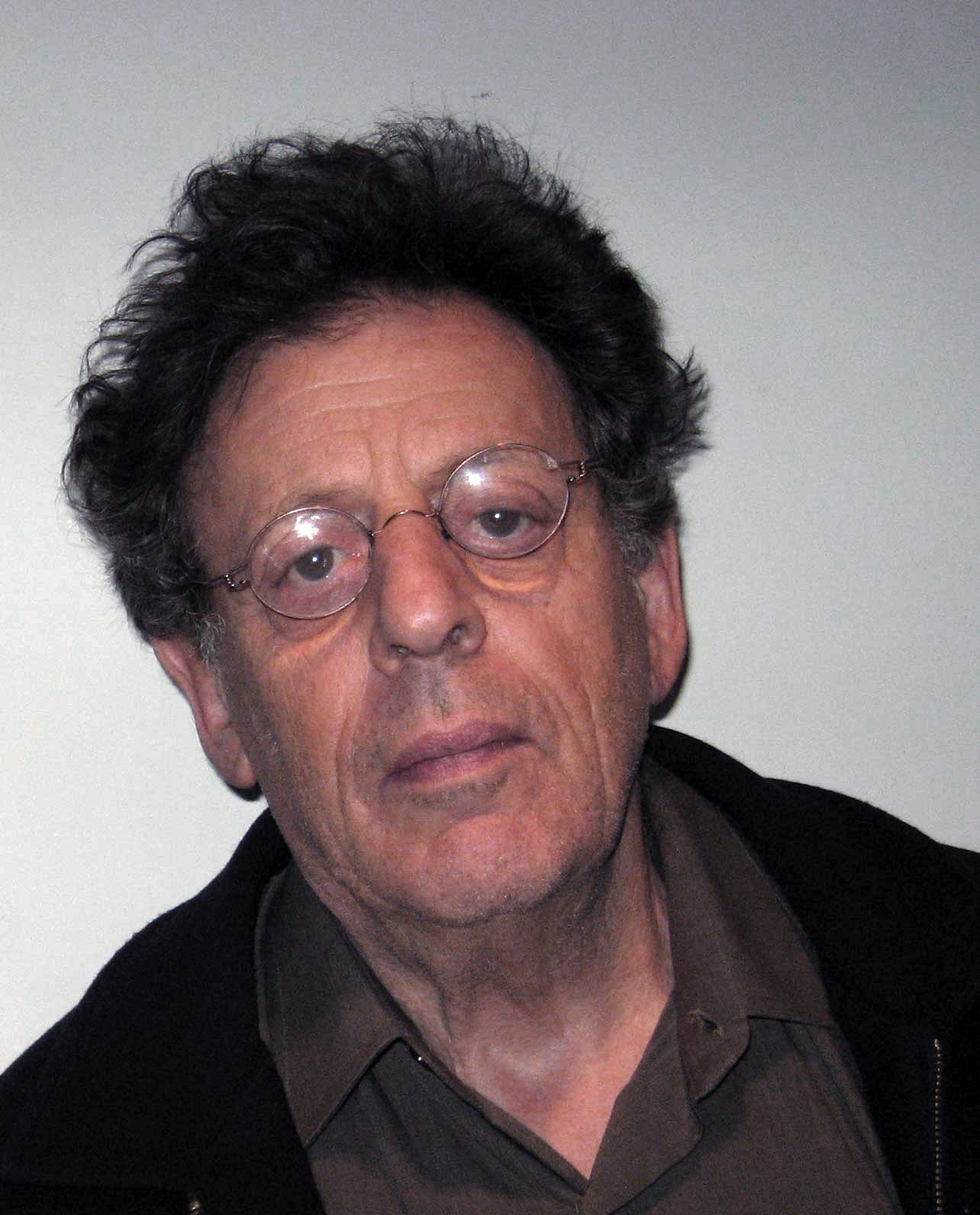
Philip Glass

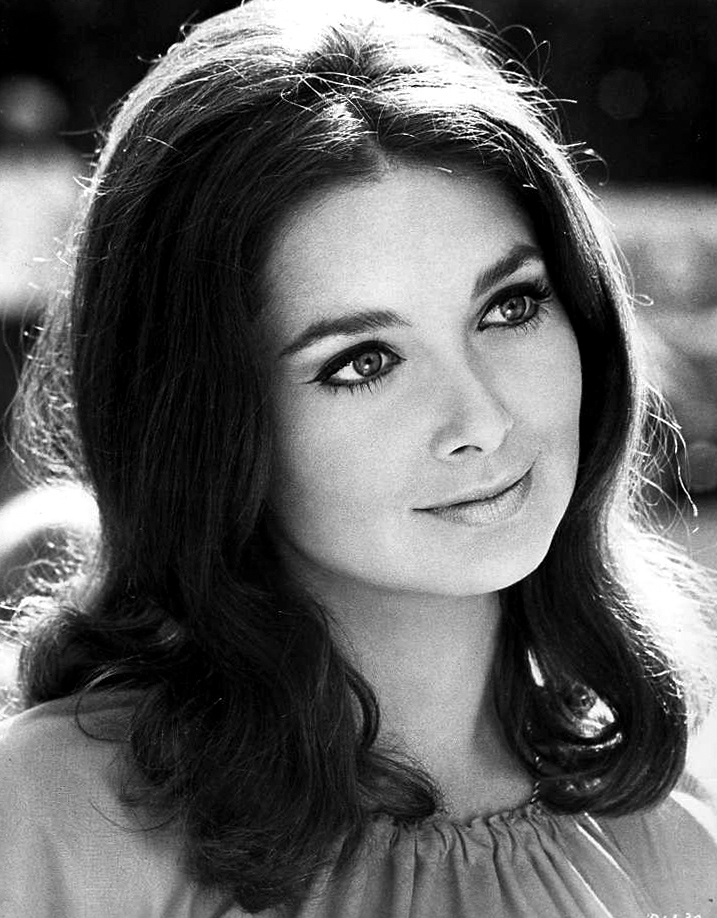
Suzanne Pleshette

- January 4
  - Grace Bumbry, African American opera singer (d. 2023)
  - Dyan Cannon, American actress, director, screenwriter, editor and producer
  - Lorene Mann, American country music singer, songwriter (d. 2013)
- January 6
  - Underwood Dudley, American mathematician
  - Lou Holtz, American football coach (d. 2026)
- January 10
  - Daniel Walker Howe, American historian and academic (d. 2025)
  - Thomas Penfield Jackson, American soldier, lawyer and judge (d. 2013)
- January 13 – George Reisman, American economist
- January 14
  - Leo Kadanoff, American physicist (d. 2015)
  - Tom McEwen, American drag racer (d. 2018)
  - Billie Jo Spears, American country music singer (d. 2011)
- January 15 – Margaret O'Brien, American actress
- January 16 – Francis George, American cardinal (d. 2015)
- January 19 – Fred J. Lincoln, American actor, director, producer and screenwriter (d. 2013)
- January 22
  - Eddie Knox, American politician and lawyer (d. 2026)
  - Joseph Wambaugh, American author (d. 2025)
- January 25
  - Bill Pascrell, American politician (d. 2024)
  - Gregory Sierra, American actor (d. 2021)
- January 29 – Bobby Scott, American musician, producer and songwriter (d. 1990)
- January 31
  - Philip Glass, American composer
  - Suzanne Pleshette, American actress (d. 2008)

=== February ===
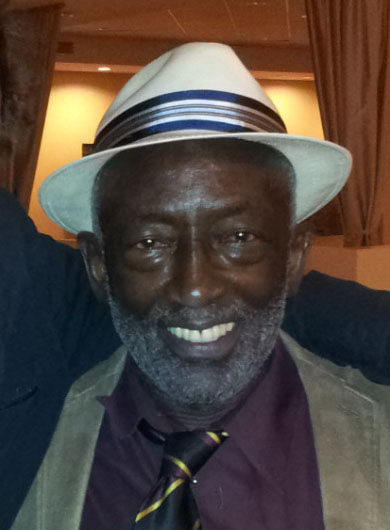
Garrett Morris

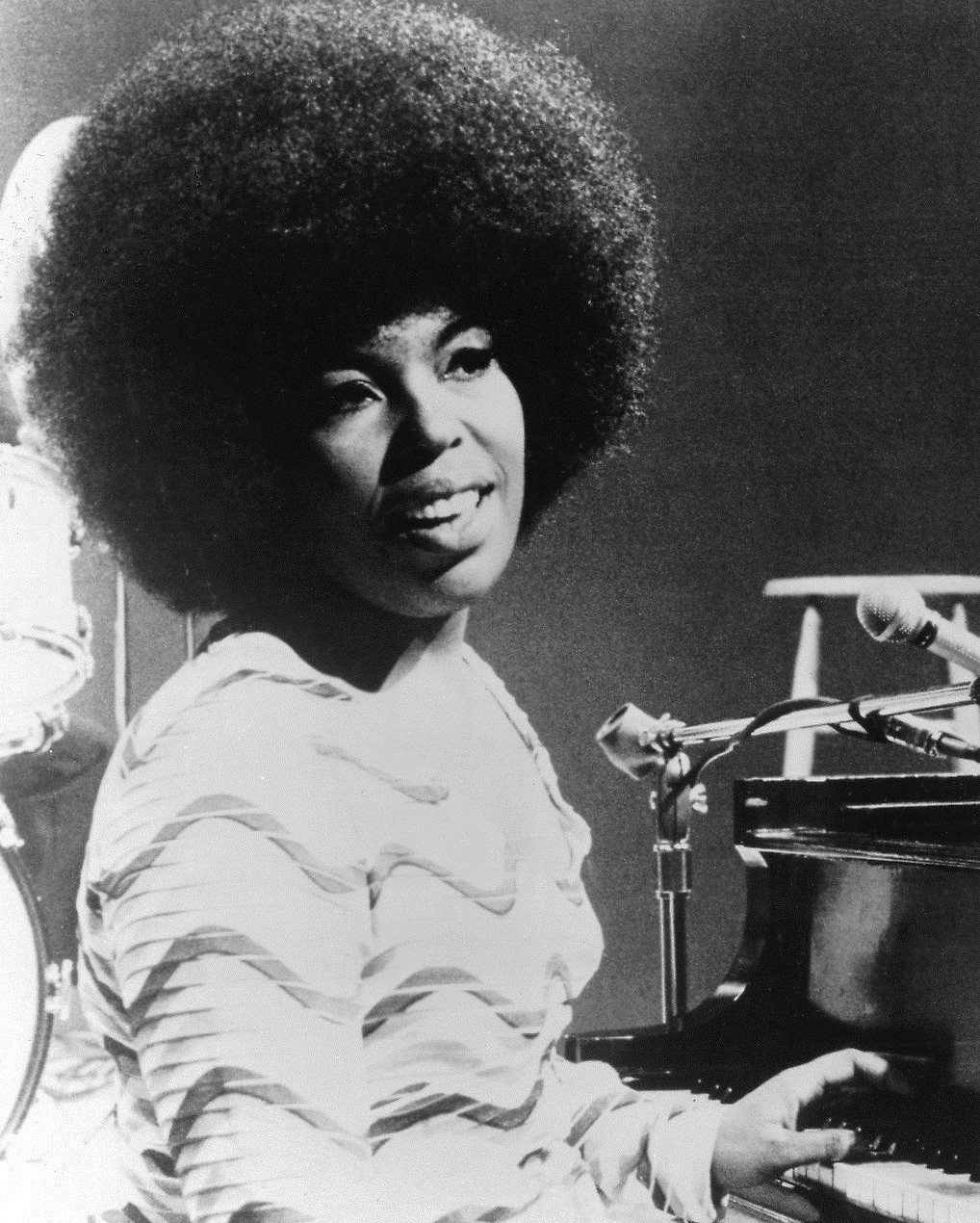
Roberta Flack

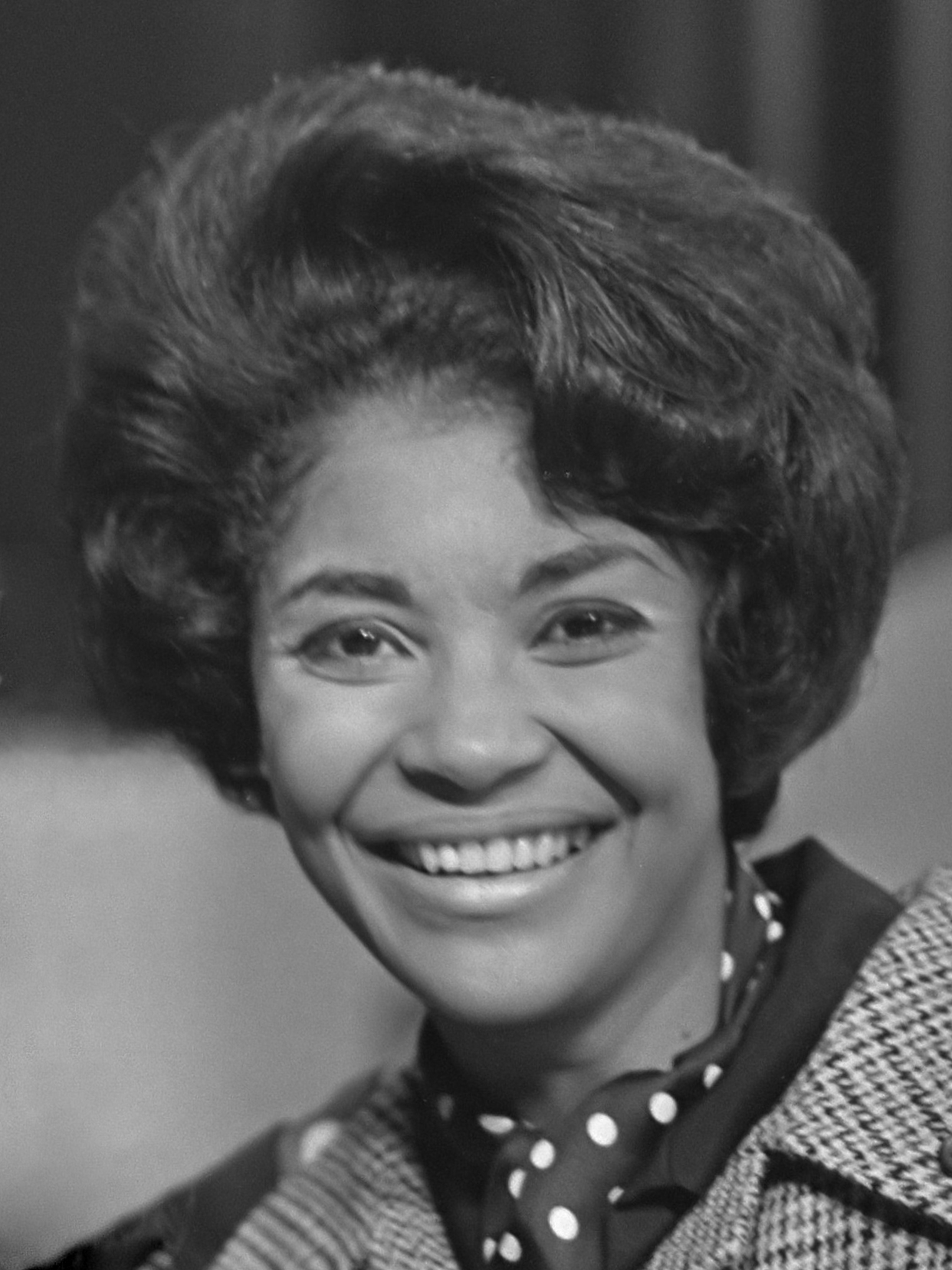
Nancy Wilson

- February 1
  - Don Everly, American rock and roll musician (The Everly Brothers) (d. 2021)
  - Garrett Morris, African-American comedian, actor (Saturday Night Live)
- February 2
  - Remak Ramsay, American actor
  - Tom Smothers, American musician, comedian (The Smothers Brothers) (d. 2023)
- February 4
  - Bill Ham, American music impresario and manager (d. 2016)
  - David Newman, American screenwriter (d. 2003)
- February 5 – Stuart Damon, American actor (d. 2021)
- February 8 – Joe Raposo, American composer and songwriter (d. 1989)
- February 9 – William Lawvere, American mathematician (d. 2023)
- February 10
  - Roberta Flack, African-American singer (d. 2025)
  - Ronnie Rondell Jr., Amertican actor and stuntman (d. 2025)
- February 11 – Greg Noll, American surfing pioneer (d. 2021)
- February 12 – Charles Dumas, American athlete (d. 2004)
- February 14
  - Magic Sam, American musician (d. 1969)
  - Jessie Maple, African-American cinematographer and civil rights activist (d. 2023)
- February 15
  - Terry Everett, American politician (d. 2024)
  - Gregory Mcdonald, American novelist (d. 2008)
- February 17 – Mary Ann Mobley, American actress (d. 2014)
- February 19 – Robert Walker, American blues guitarist (d. 2017)
- February 20
  - David Ackles, singer-songwriter and actor (d. 1999)
  - Roger Penske, race car driver
  - Nancy Wilson, African-American jazz singer and actress (d. 2018)
- February 21 – Ted Savage, American baseball player (d. 2023)
- February 23 – J. W. Lockett, American football player (d. 1999)
- February 25 – Bob Schieffer, American television journalist
- February 27 – Barbara Babcock, American actress

=== March ===
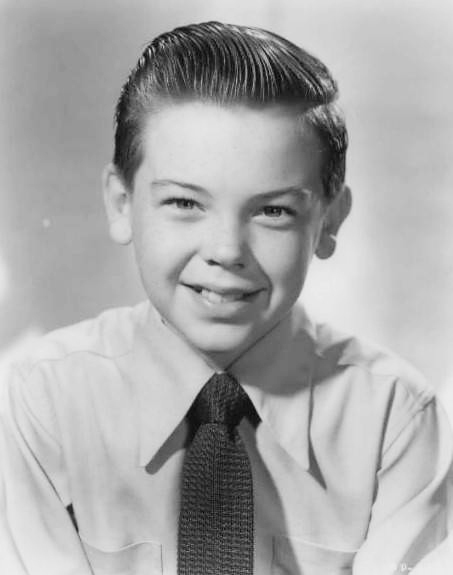
Bobby Driscoll

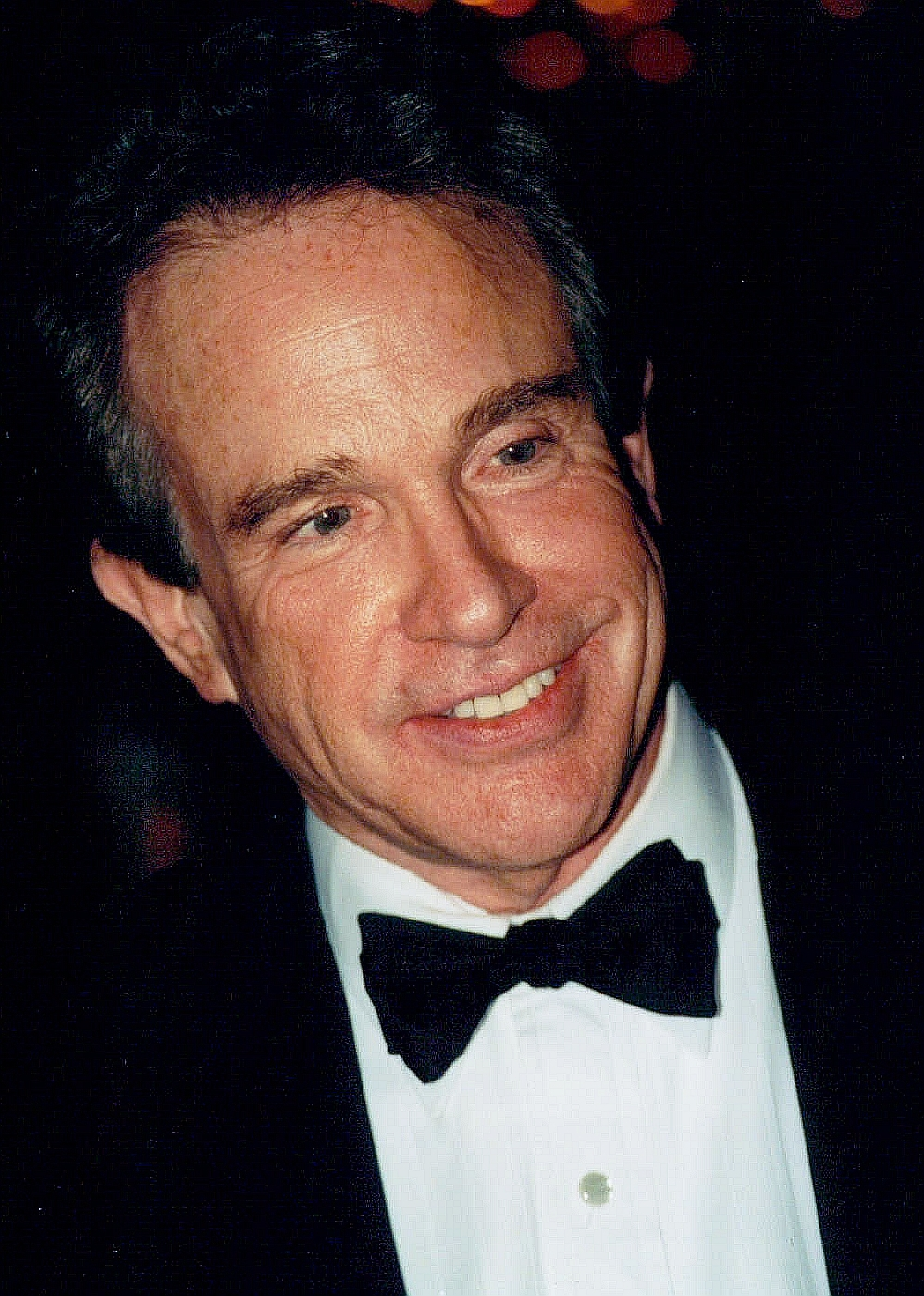
Warren Beatty

- March 2 – Denny Crum, American basketball coach (d. 2023)
- March 3 – Bobby Driscoll, American actor (d. 1968)
- March 4 – Leslie H. Gelb, American foreign policy expert (d. 2019)
- March 6 – Ivan Boesky, stock trader and convicted felon (d. 2024)
- March 8 – Richard Fariña, American folk music singer, novelist (d. 1966)
- March 16 – William L. Armstrong, American politician (d. 2016)
- March 17
  - Frank Calabrese, Sr., American gangster in the Chicago Outfit (d. 2012)
  - Vince Martin, American singer, songwriter (d. 2018)
- March 20
  - Jerry Reed, American singer, songwriter, actor, and guitarist (d. 2008)
  - Eddie Shaw, African-American saxophonist and songwriter (d. 2018)
- March 22 – Angelo Badalamenti, American composer (d. 2022)
- March 23
  - Craig Breedlove, American race car driver (d. 2023)
  - Tony Burton, African-American actor, boxer and football player (d. 2016)
  - Robert Gallo, American biomedical researcher
- March 26 – Wayne Embry, American basketball player and team executive
- March 27 – Thomas Aquinas Daly, American painter
- March 29 – Billy Carter, American farmer, businessman, brewer and politician (d. 1988)
- March 30 – Warren Beatty, American actor, director

=== April ===
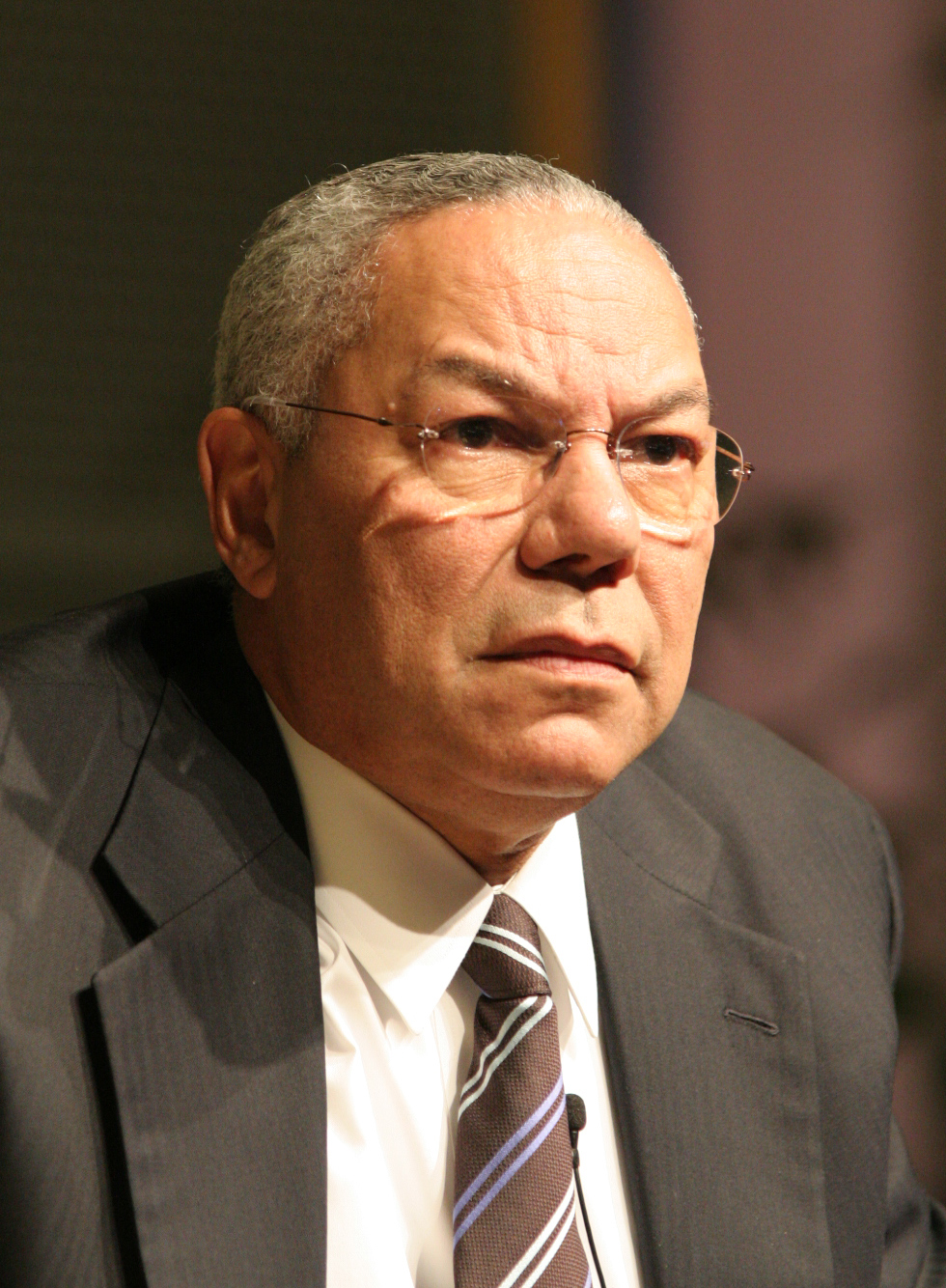
Colin Powell

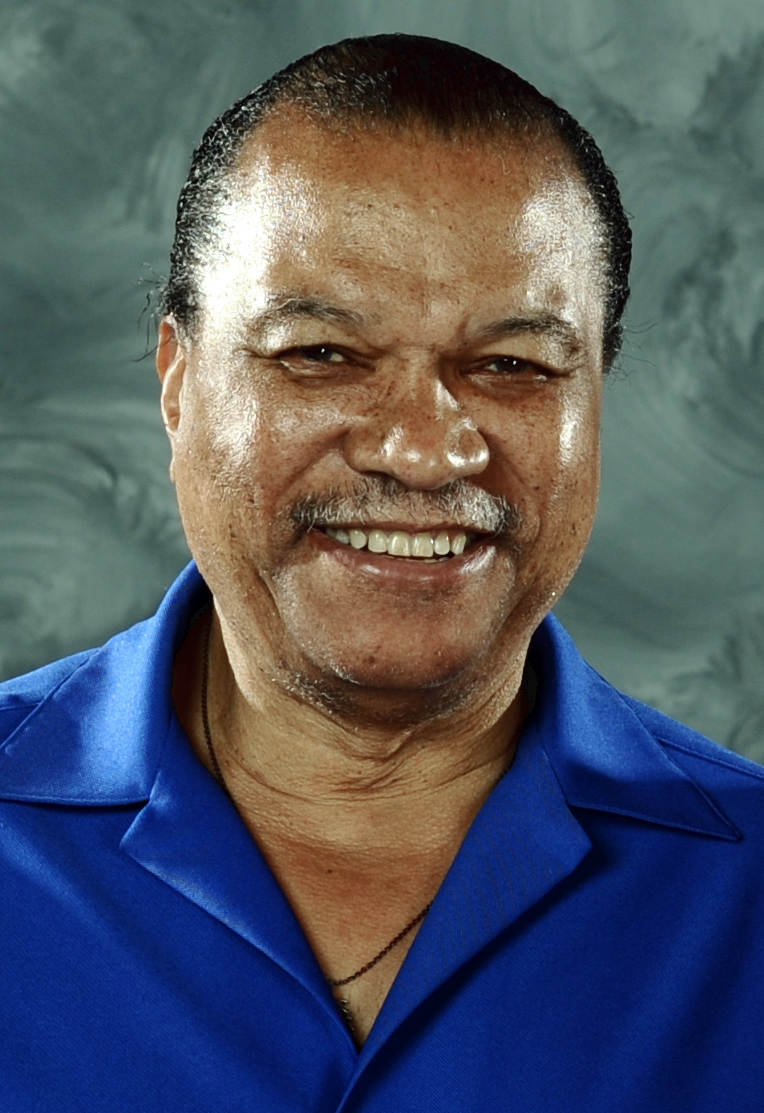
Billy Dee Williams

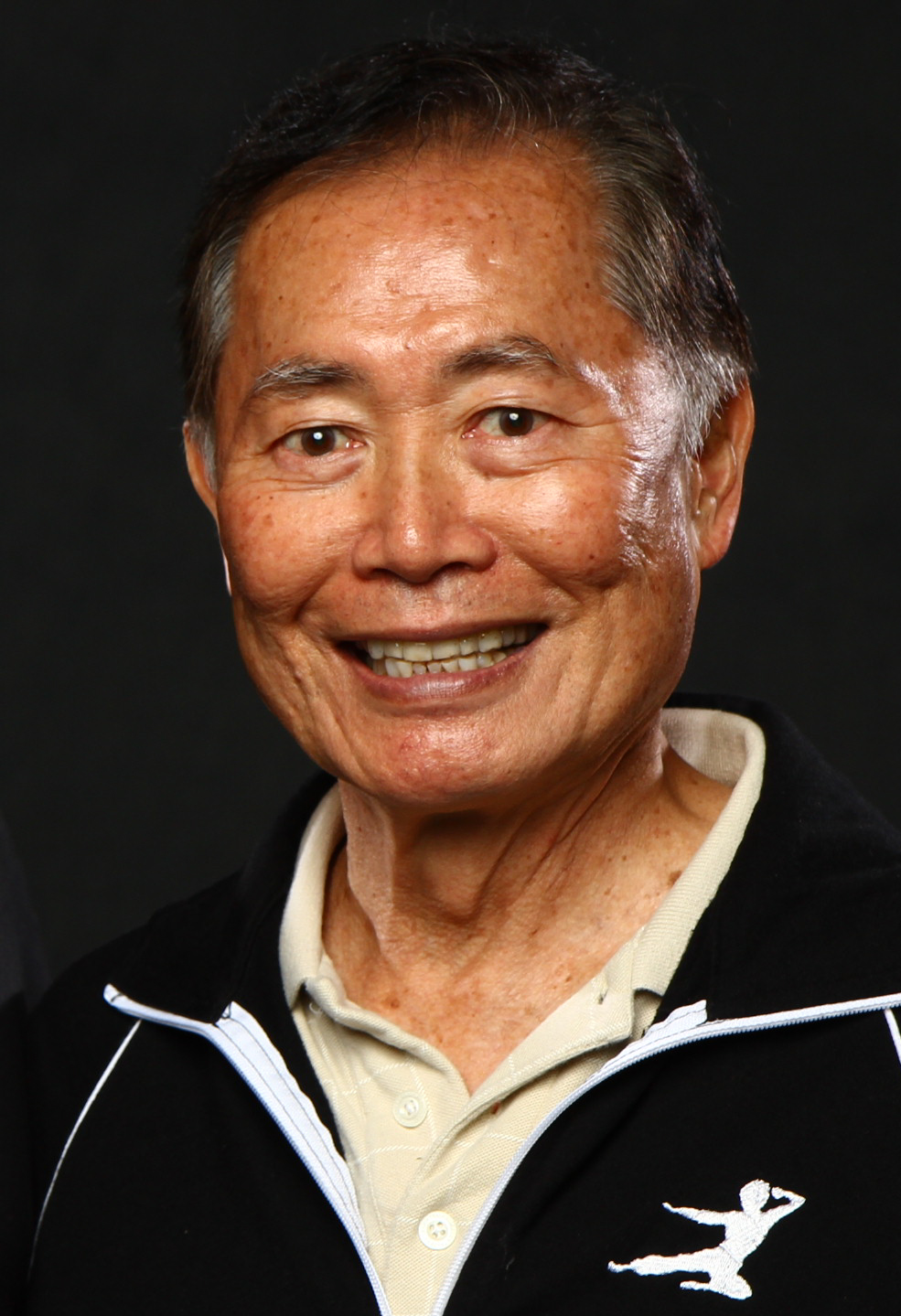
George Takei

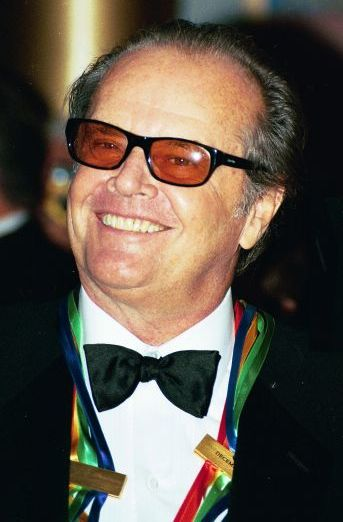
Jack Nicholson

- April 2 – Paul Kanjorski, American politician
- April 3
  - John Arrillaga, American real estate developer and philanthropist (d. 2022)
  - Sandra Spuzich, American professional golfer (d. 2015)
- April 5
  - Joseph Lelyveld, American journalist (d. 2024)
  - Colin Powell, African-American general and politician, 65th U.S. Secretary of State (d. 2021)
  - Maryanne Trump Barry, American attorney and judge (d. 2023)
- April 6
  - Merle Haggard, American country musician (d. 2016)
  - Billy Dee Williams, African-American actor
- April 7 – Charlie Thomas, American R&B musician (d. 2023)
- April 8
  - Seymour Hersh, American investigative journalist and political writer
  - Robert Woodson, American civil rights activist (d. 2026)
- April 12
  - Dennis Banks, leader of the American Indian Movement (d. 2017)
  - Gene Lenz, American competition swimmer (d. 2005)
- April 13 – Lanford Wilson, American playwright (d. 2011)
- April 15
  - Robert W. Gore, American inventor (d. 2020)
  - Frank Vincent, American actor (d. 2017)
- April 16 – George Steele, American professional wrestler and actor (d. 2017)
- April 17 – Don Buchla, American electronic-instrument designer (d. 2016)
- April 18 – Robert Hooks, African-American actor, producer and activist
- April 19 – Elinor Donahue, American actress
- April 20 – George Takei, Japanese-American actor, director, author and activist
- April 21 – David Lucas, American rock and roll composer, singer and music producer
- April 22
  - Bobbi Fiedler, American politician (d. 2019)
  - Jack Nicholson, American actor, film director, producer and writer
  - Jack Nitzsche, American musician, arranger, songwriter, composer and record producer (d. 2000)
- April 23 – Don Massengale, American professional golfer (d. 2007)
- April 24 – Joe Henderson, American rhythm and blues, gospel music singer (d. 1964)
- April 26 – Bob Boozer, American professional basketball player (d. 2012)
- April 27 – Sandy Dennis, American actress (d. 1992)
- April 28 – Diane Hoh, American author (d. 2025)

=== May ===
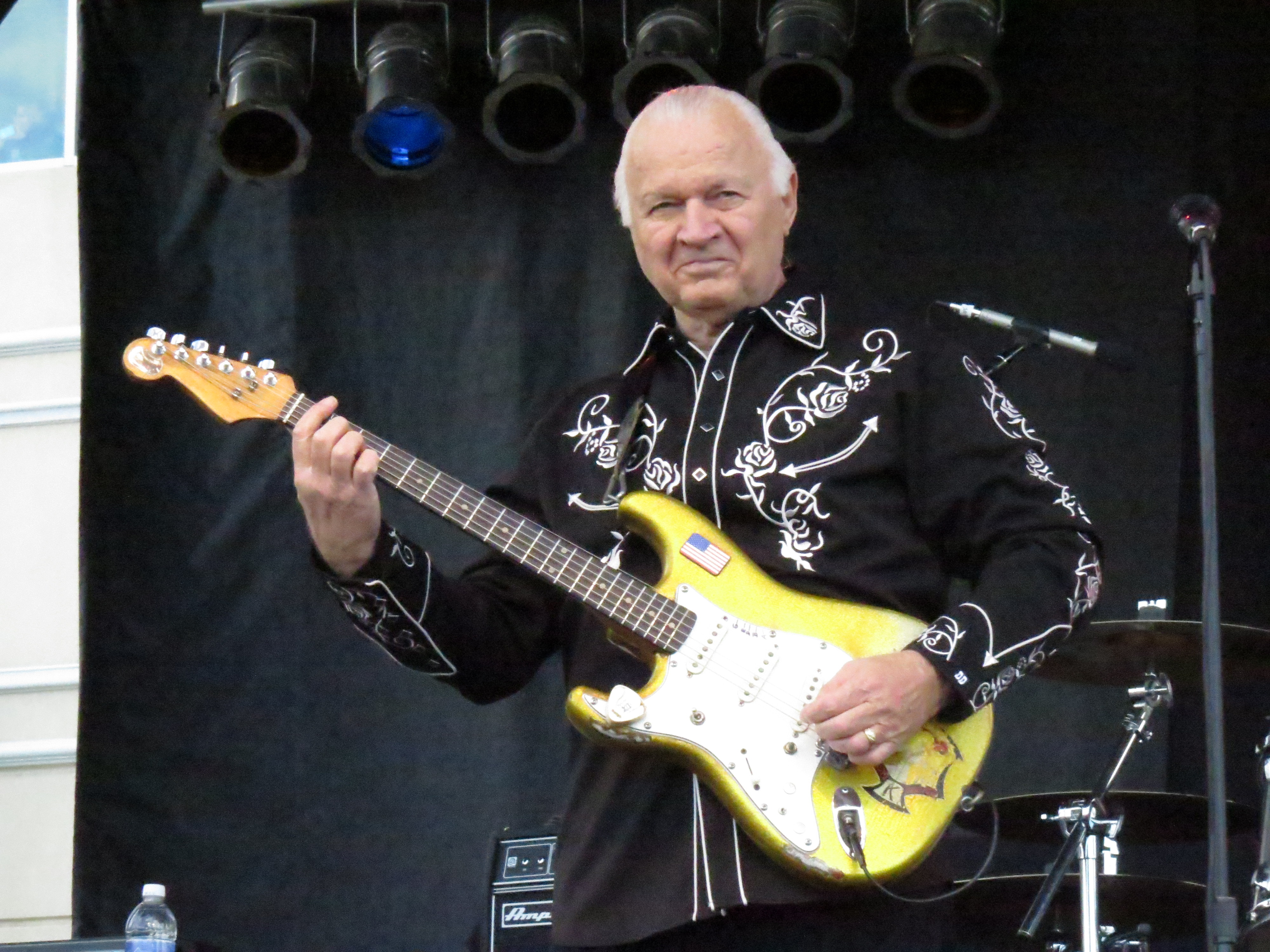
Dick Dale

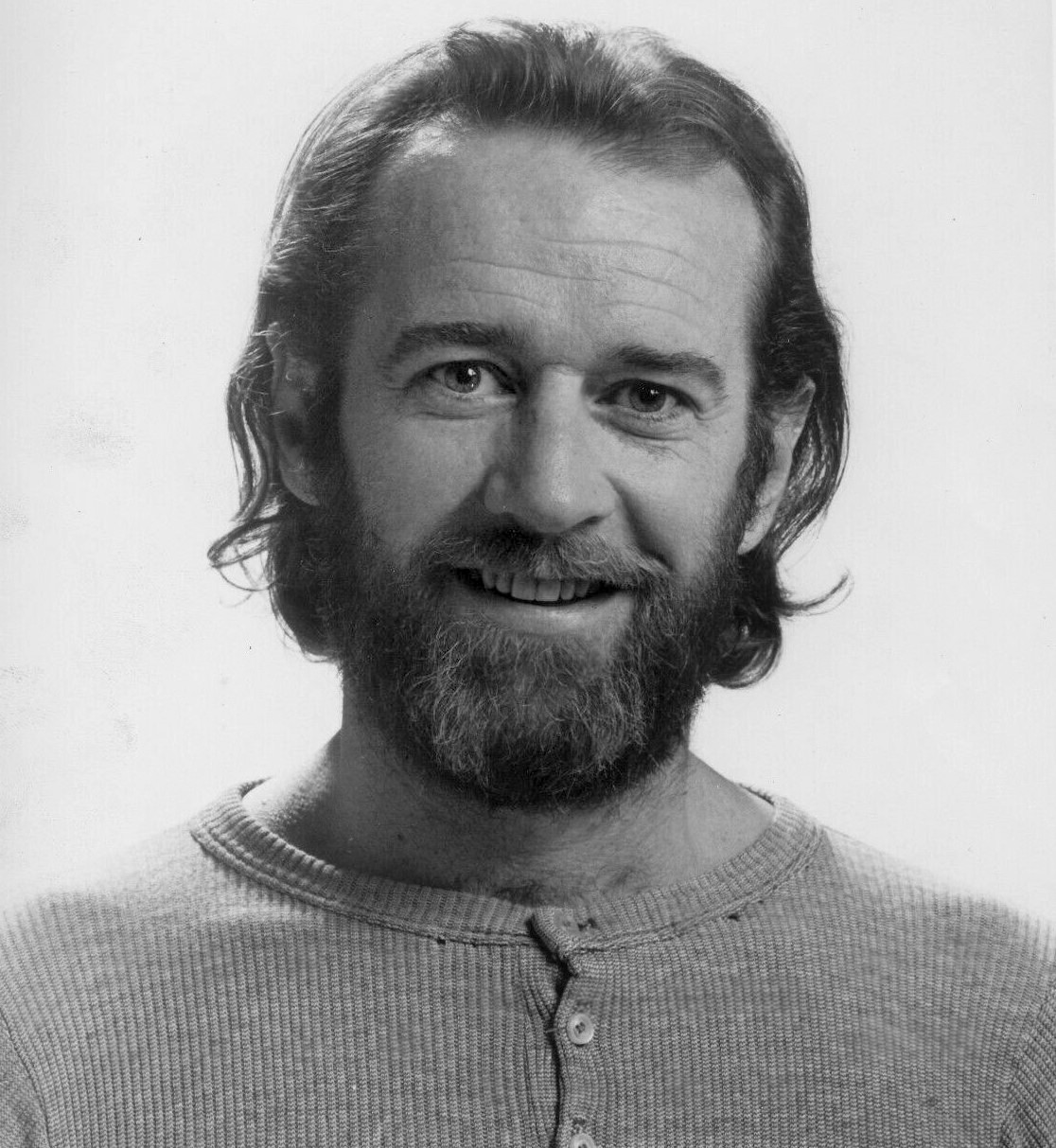
George Carlin

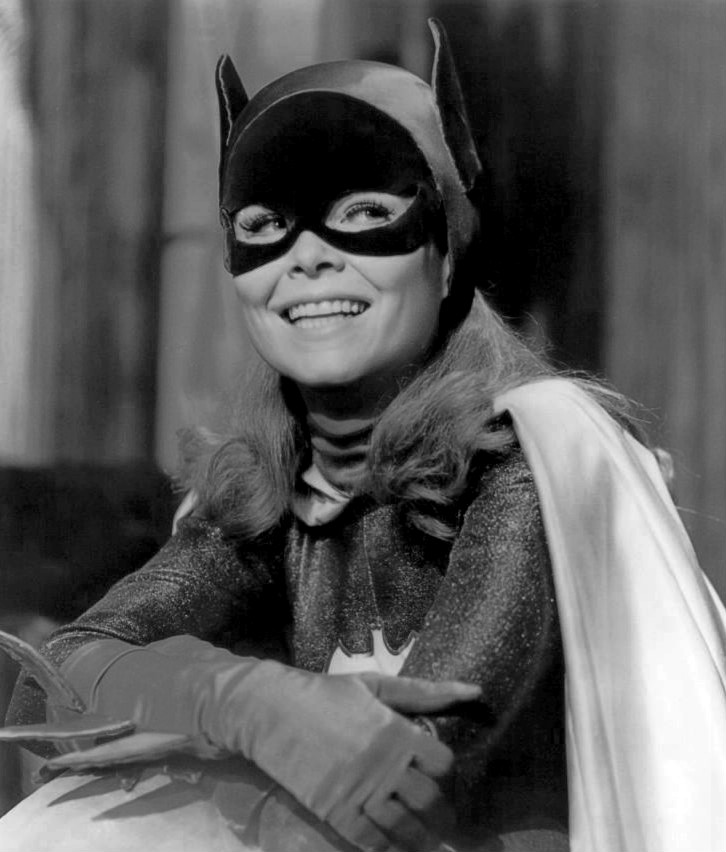
Yvonne Craig

- May 2 – Lorenzo Music, American voice actor (d. 2001)
- May 4
  - Ron Carter, American jazz musician
  - Dick Dale, American surf rock guitarist (d. 2019)
- May 6 – Rubin Carter, African-American boxer wrongfully convicted of murder (d. 2014)
- May 8 – Dennis DeConcini, American politician
- May 9 – Alison Jolly, American primatologist (d. 2014)
- May 10
  - Jim Hickman, American baseball outfielder (d. 2016)
  - Arthur Kopit, American playwright (d. 2021)
  - Mike Melvoin, American jazz pianist, composer and arranger (d. 2012)
- May 12 – George Carlin, American stand-up comedian, actor, author and social critic (d. 2008)
- May 13
  - Beverley Owen, American actress (d. 2019)
  - Roger Zelazny, American writer (d. 1995)
- May 15
  - Trini Lopez, American singer, guitarist and actor (d. 2020)
  - Richard Robinson, American business executive and educator (d. 2021)
  - Joe Tait, American sportscaster (d. 2021)
- May 16
  - Yvonne Craig, American actress (Batman) (d. 2015)
  - Jim Hunt, American politician, governor of North Carolina (d. 2025)
  - Robert B. Wilson, American economist, Nobel Prize laureate
- May 17 – Hazel R. O'Leary, U.S. Secretary of Energy
- May 18 – Brooks Robinson, American baseball player (d. 2023)
- May 24 – Timothy Brown, American football player and actor (d. 2020)
- May 25 – Mark Shields, American political analyst (d. 2022)
- May 30 – Deanna Lund, American actress (d. 2018)

=== June ===
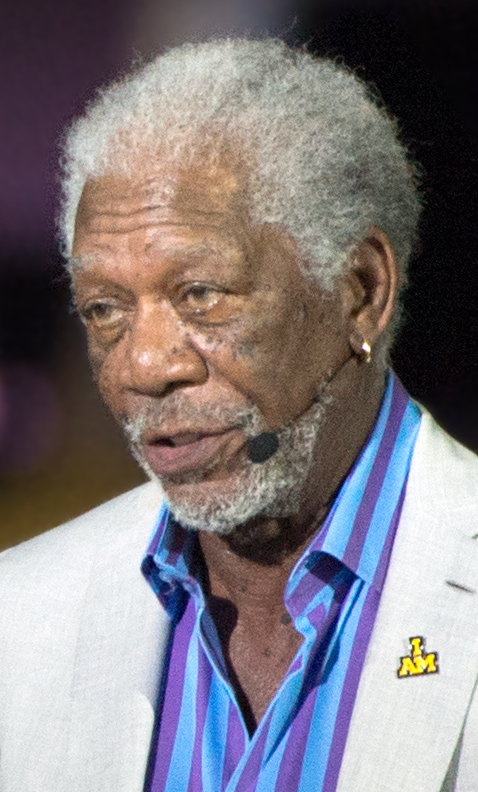
Morgan Freeman

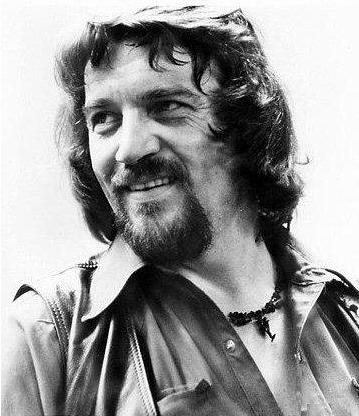
Waylon Jennings

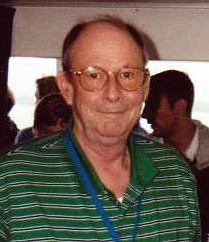
Robert Coleman Richardson

- June 1 – Morgan Freeman, African-American actor
- June 2
  - Sally Kellerman, American actress (d. 2022)
  - Helen Siff, American actress (d. 2025)
- June 3
  - Phyllis Baker, American professional baseball player (d. 2006)
  - Tony DeLuca, American politician (d. 2022)
  - Crawford Hallock Greenewalt, Jr., American archaeologist (d. 2012)
  - Solomon P. Ortiz, American soldier and politician
  - John Walker, American politician (d. 2019)
- June 4 – Gorilla Monsoon, American professional wrestler, announcer (d. 1999)
- June 7 – Red Grooms, American painter and illustrator
- June 8
  - Toni Harper, American child singer (d. 2023)
  - Bruce McCandless II, American astronaut (d. 2017)
- June 11 – David Mumford, American mathematician
- June 12 – Sidney M. Wolfe, American physician (d. 2024)
- June 13 – Eleanor Holmes Norton, African-American politician
- June 15 – Waylon Jennings, American country singer (d. 2002)
- June 16
  - Jim Dine, American painter
  - Erich Segal, American novelist and screenwriter (d. 2010)
- June 18
  - Wray Carlton, American football player
  - Jay Rockefeller, American politician (d. 2026)
- June 21
  - Gerald Clarke, American author
  - Jon Huntsman Sr., American businessman, philanthropist (d. 2018)
- June 25 – Eddie Floyd, African-American soul-R&B singer and songwriter
- June 26
  - Donald J. Albanese, American politician
  - Robert Coleman Richardson, American physicist, recipient of the Nobel Prize in Physics in 1996 (d. 2013)
- June 27
  - Joseph P. Allen, American astronaut
  - Abraham Karem, Iraqi-born American aerospace engineer
  - George Raveling, American basketball player and coach (d. 2025)
- June 28 – Ron Luciano, American baseball umpire, writer (d. 1995)
- June 30
  - Ron Husmann, American actor
  - Walton McLeod, American politician

=== July ===
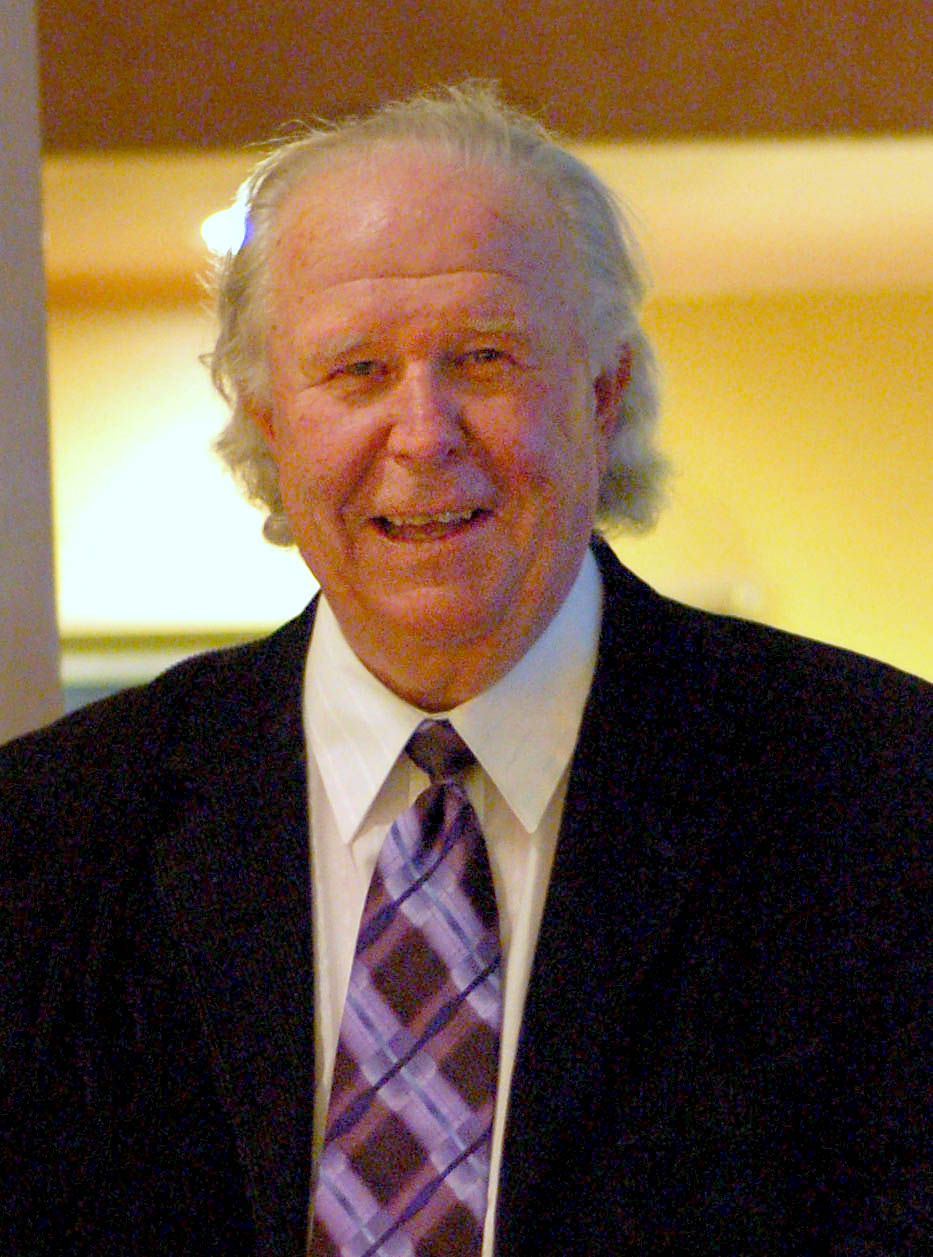
Ned Beatty

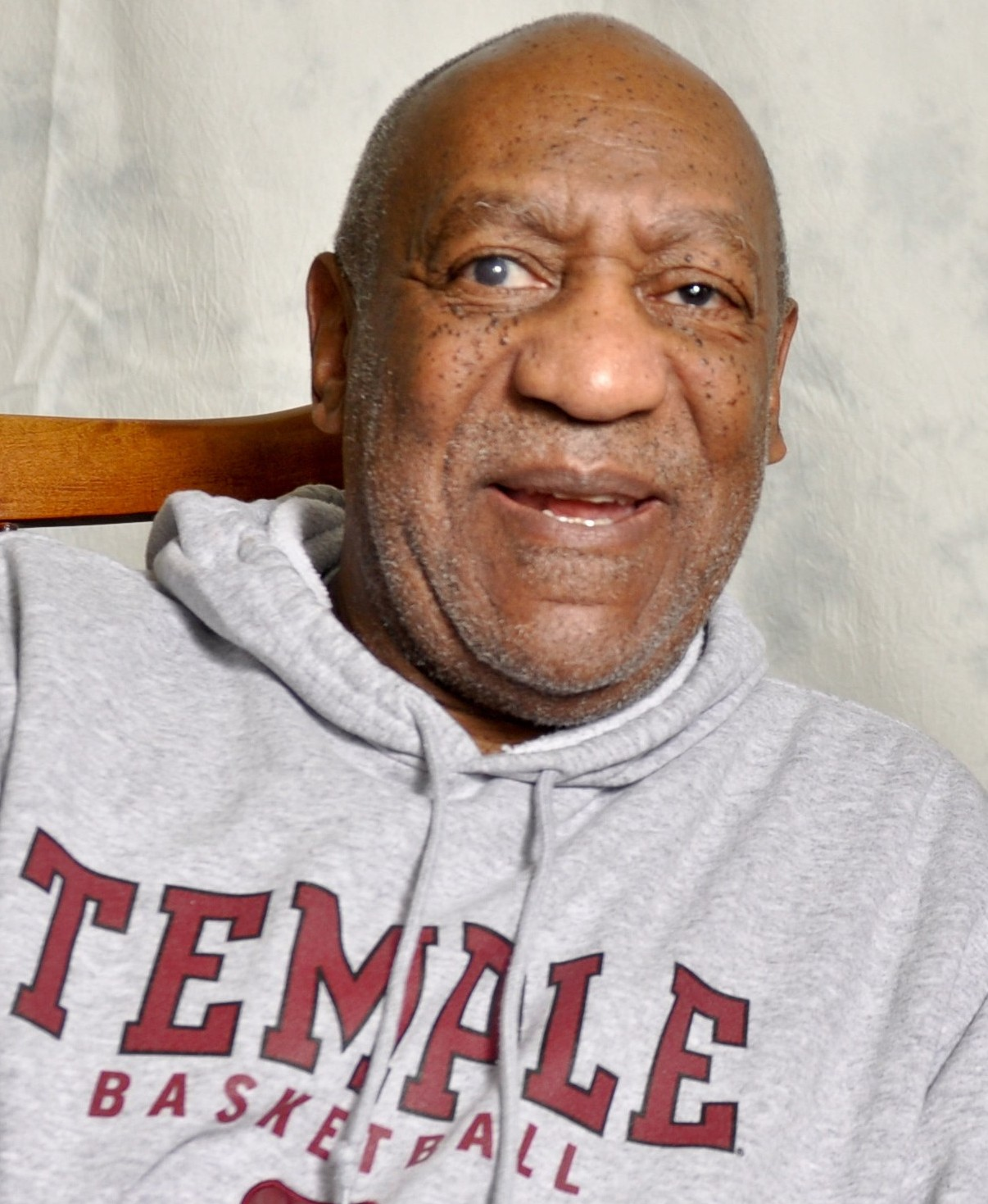
Bill Cosby

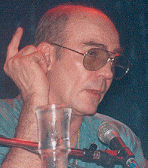
Hunter S. Thompson

- July 2
  - Polly Holliday, American actress (d. 2025)
  - Dennis Keeney, American soil and water chemistry scientist
  - Richard Petty, American stock car racer, 7-time NASCAR Winston Cup champion
  - Martin J. Sherwin, American historian (d. 2021)
- July 4
  - Richard Rhodes, American historian, journalist and author
  - Ray Pillow, American country music singer (d. 2023)
- July 6 – Ned Beatty, American actor (d. 2021)
- July 7
  - Carroll Hubbard, American politician (d. 2022)
  - Carol Nugent, American actress
- July 12
  - Bill Cosby, African-American actor, comedian, educator and convicted sex offender
  - Bruce W. Klunder, American Presbyterian minister and civil rights activist (d. 1964)
- July 16
  - Richard Bryan, American politician
  - Lee Elia, American baseball player (d. 2025)
- July 18
  - Bette E. Landman, American anthropologist and academic administrator (d. 2025)
  - Hunter S. Thompson, American author, journalist (d. 2005)
- July 19
  - George Hamilton IV, American country music singer (d. 2014)
  - Bibb Latané, American social psychologist
- July 20 – Dick Hafer, American Christian cartoonist (d. 2003)
- July 27 – Don Galloway, American actor (d. 2009)
- July 29 – Daniel McFadden, American economist, Nobel Prize laureate
- July 30 – Marian Robinson, mother of Michelle Obama (d. 2024)
- July 31 — Sab Shimono, American actor

=== August ===
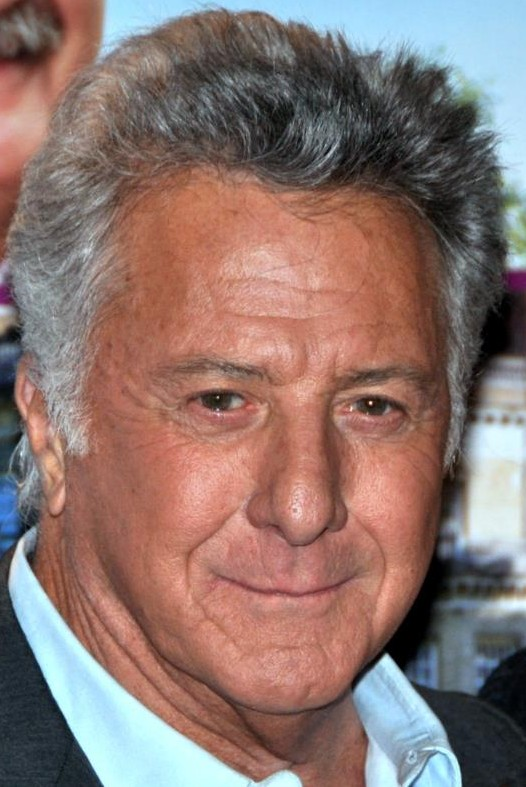
Dustin Hoffman

- August 1 – Al D'Amato, American politician
- August 3 – Roland Burris, American politician
- August 4
  - Paul Abels, American United Methodist minister (d. 1992)
  - David Bedford, American musician (d. 2011)
  - David Holliday, American actor (d. 1999)
- August 5 – Herb Brooks, American hockey coach (d. 2003)
- August 6 – Charlie Haden, American jazz bassist (d. 2014)
- August 7 – Magic Slim, African-American blues singer and guitarist (d. 2013)
- August 8 – Dustin Hoffman, American actor, director
- August 14 – Alberta Nelson, American actress (d. 2006)
- August 21
  - Robert Stone, American novelist (d. 2015)
  - Chuck Traynor, American pornographer (d. 2002)
- August 26 – Don Bowman, American comedian, country music singer, songwriter, and radio host (d. 2013)
- August 27 – Alice Coltrane, African-American jazz harpist, organist, pianist and composer (d. 2007)
- August 31 – Bobby Parker, American rock musician (d. 2013)

=== September ===
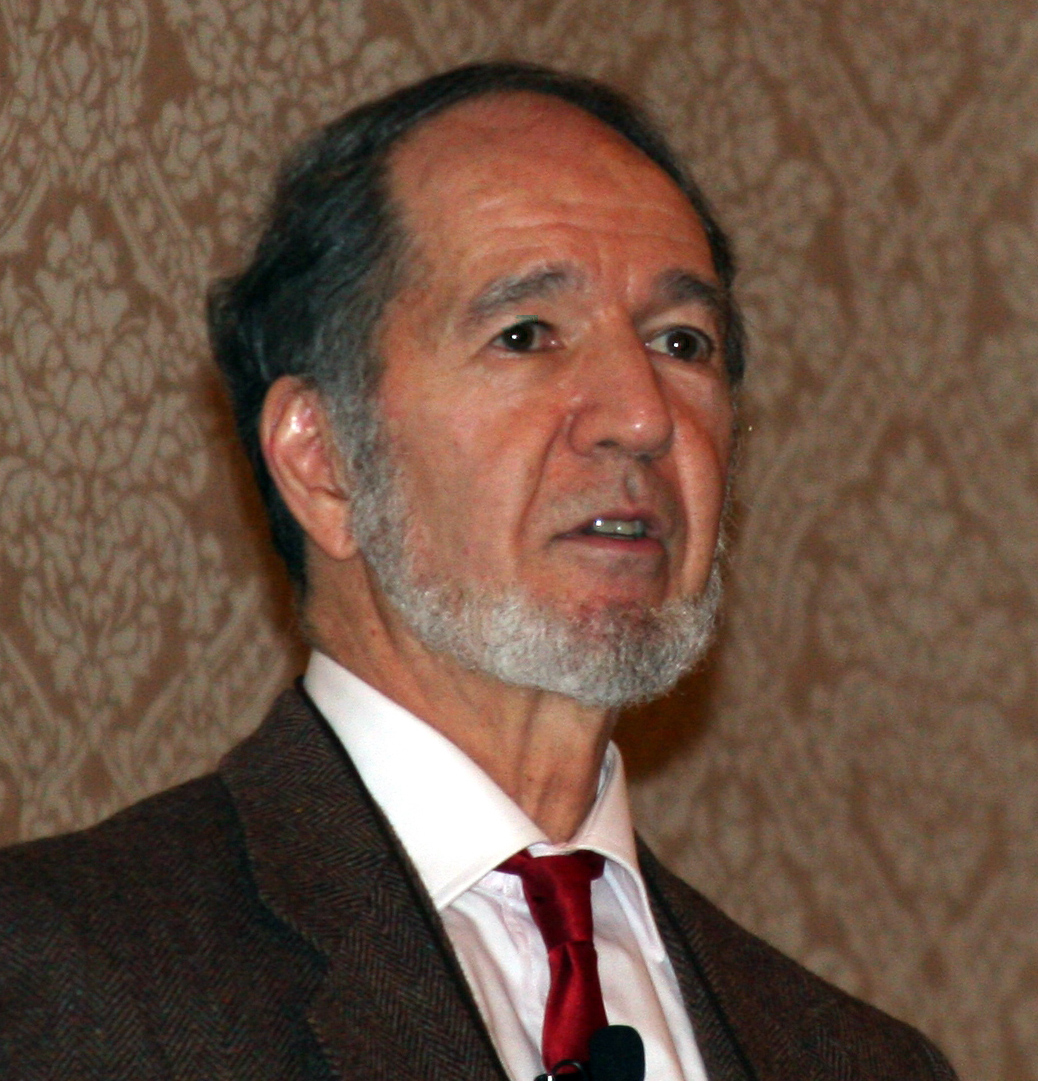
Jared Diamond

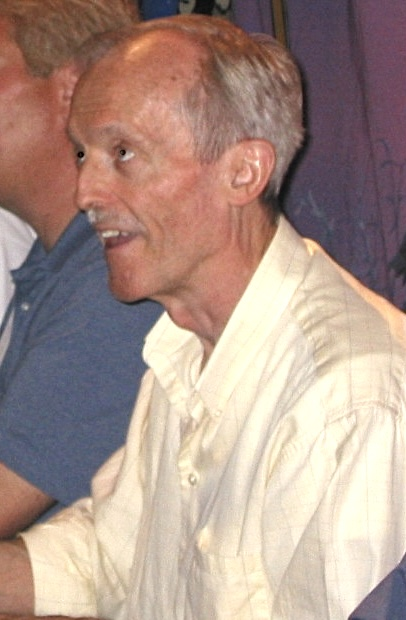
Don Bluth

- September 1
  - Al Geiberger, golfer
  - Ron O'Neal, actor, director, and screenwriter (d. 2004)
  - Allen Weinstein, historian and academic (d. 2015)
- September 5 – A. George Pradel, American police officer, politician (d. 2018)
- September 6 – Jo Anne Worley, American actress, comedian (Rowan and Martin's Laugh-In)
- September 7 – John Phillip Law, American actor (d. 2008)
- September 8 – Barbara Frum, American radio and television journalist (d. 1992)
- September 10
  - Jared Diamond, American geographer, anthropologist, and author (Guns, Germs, and Steel)
  - Tommy Overstreet, American country singer (d. 2015)
- September 13 – Don Bluth, American animator, film director, producer, writer, production designer, video game designer and animation instructor
- September 15
  - King Curtis Iaukea, American professional wrestler (d. 2010)
  - Robert Lucas, Jr., American economist, Nobel Prize laureate (d. 2023)
- September 19 – Abner Haynes, American football player (d. 2024)
- September 20
  - George Izo, American football player (d. 2022)
  - Robert L. Gerry III, businessman
- September 26 – Jerry Weintraub, American film producer, talent agent (d. 2015)
- September 28
  - Rod Roddy, American television announcer (d. 2003)
  - Bob Schul, American Olympic athlete (d. 2024)

=== October ===
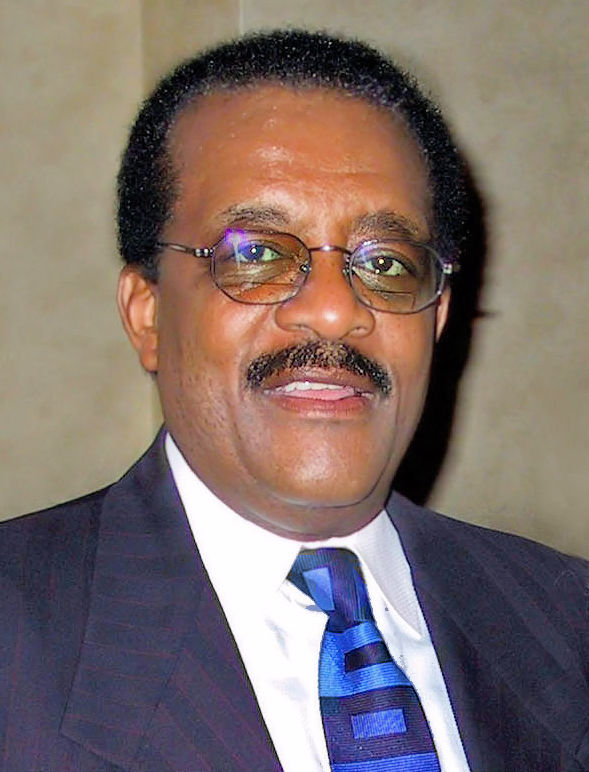
Johnnie Cochran

- October 2 – Johnnie Cochran, African-American attorney (d. 2005)
- October 4 – Leon Thomas, American jazz and blues singer (d. 1999)
- October 5 – Barry Switzer, American football coach
- October 8 – Frank Cignetti Sr., American football player and coach (d. 2022)
- October 10 – Danny Kaleikini, American singer and entertainer (d. 2023)
- October 15 – Linda Lavin, American actress and singer (d. 2024)
- October 20 – Wanda Jackson, American singer, songwriter, pianist and guitarist
- October 22 – Alan Ladd Jr., American film executive and producer (d. 2022)
- October 24 – John Goetz, American professional baseball player (d. 2008)
- October 25 – Jeanne Black, American singer (d. 2014)
- October 26 – John "Jabo" Starks, African-American drummer (d. 2018)
- October 28 – Lenny Wilkens, American basketball player, coach (d. 2025)
- October 31 – Tom Paxton, American folk singer-songwriter

=== November ===
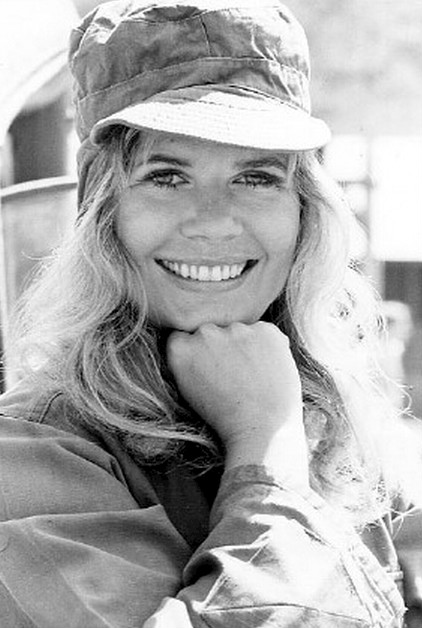
Loretta Swit

- November 1 – Bill Anderson, American country music singer, songwriter and game show host
- November 2
  - Earl Carroll, African-American lead vocalist for The Cadillacs (d. 2012)
  - Bob Spoo, American football coach (d. 2018)
- November 4
  - W. Dabney Stuart, American poet
  - Loretta Swit, American actress (M*A*S*H) (d. 2025)
- November 5 – Harris Yulin, American actor (d. 2025)
- November 6 – Eugene Pitt, American musician (d. 2018)
- November 7 – Wayne Yates, American basketball player (d. 2022)
- November 9 – Vernon Taylor, American rockabilly musician
- November 12
  - Mills Lane, American boxer, referee, lawyer and judge (d. 2022)
  - Richard H. Truly, American admiral, pilot and astronaut (d. 2024)
- November 15 – Little Willie John, African-American rock and roll, rhythm and blues singer (d. 1968)
- November 20 – Ruth Laredo, American pianist (d. 2005)
- November 21
  - Tina Howe, American playwright (d. 2023)
  - Marlo Thomas, American actress, producer and social activist (That Girl)
- November 30 – Luther Ingram, African-American R&B singer, songwriter (d. 2007)

=== December ===
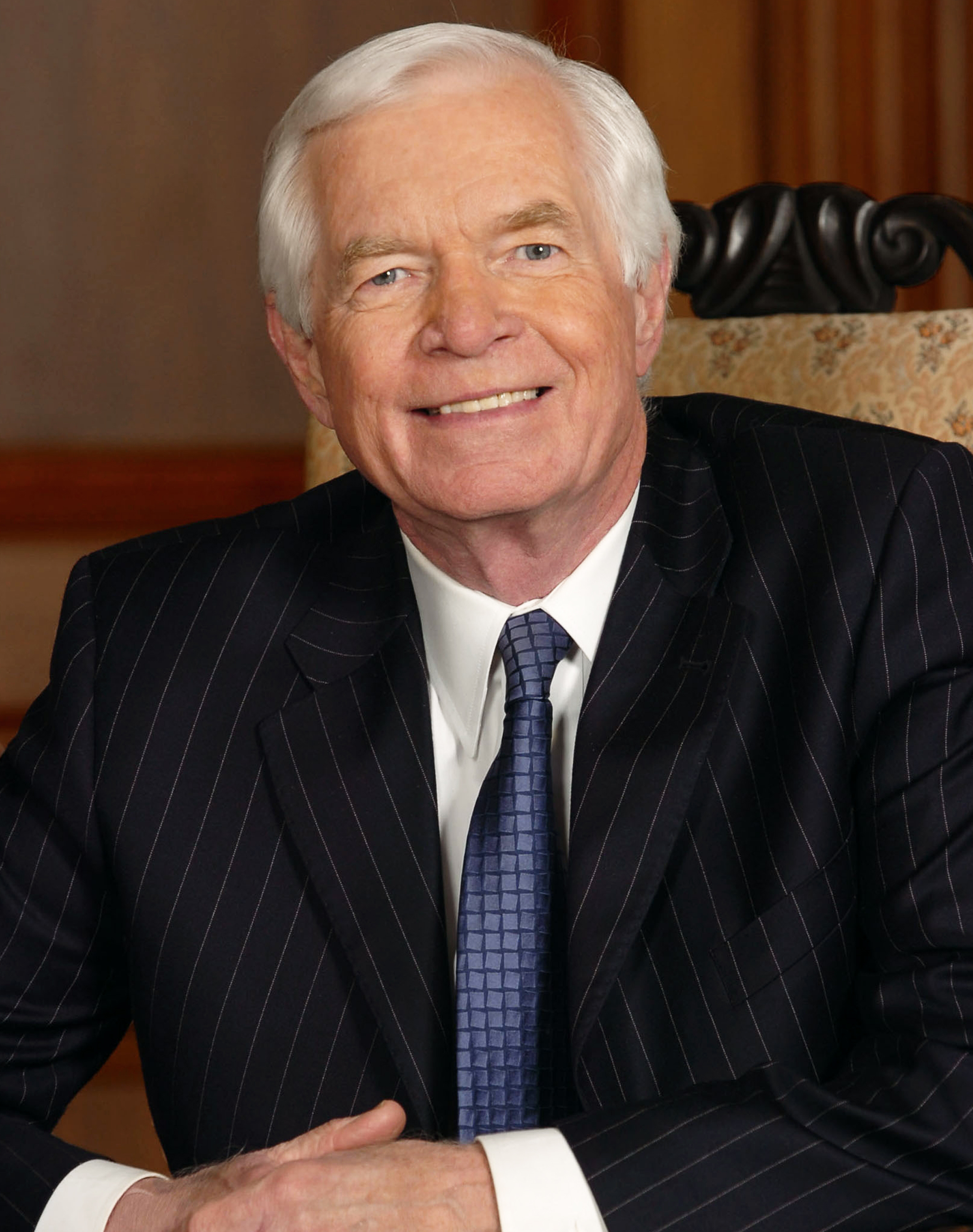
Thad Cochran

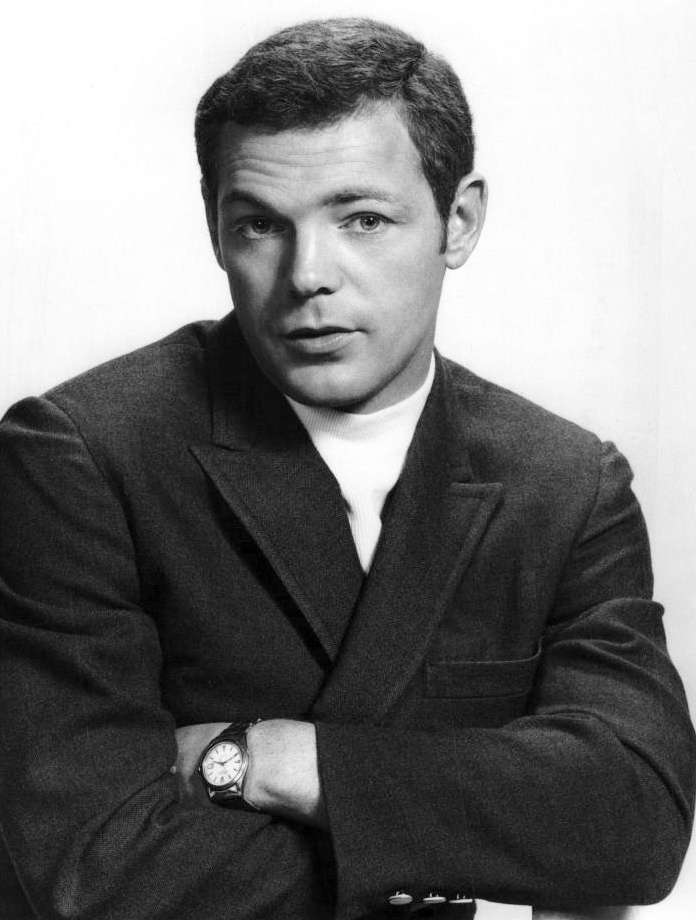
James MacArthur

- December 1 – Bruce Brown, American documentary film director (d. 2017)
- December 3
  - Bobby Allison, American race car driver (d. 2024)
  - John Seymour, American politician
- December 7
  - Thad Cochran, American politician (d. 2019)
  - Kaffe Fassett, American artist
- December 8
  - Michael Bowen, American artist (d. 2009 in Sweden)
  - James MacArthur, American actor (d. 2010)
- December 9 – Darwin Joston, American actor (d. 1998)
- December 11
  - Beegie Adair, American jazz pianist and bandleader (d. 2022)
  - Jim Harrison, American writer (d. 2016)
- December 12
  - Connie Francis, American pop singer (d. 2025)
  - Flukey Stokes, American mobster (d. 1986)
- December 13 – Jon A. Reynolds, United States Air Force officer (d. 2022)
- December 16 – Edward Ruscha, American painter
- December 17 – Art Neville, African-American singer, songwriter (d. 2019)
- December 20 – John L. Canley, American Medal of Honour recipient (d. 2022)
- December 21
  - Jane Fonda, American actress and political activist
  - Donald F. Munson, American politician
- December 23 – Karol J. Bobko, American aerospace engineer and astronaut (d. 2023)
- December 27 – Tom Tall, American singer (d. 2013)
- December 30
  - John Hartford, American musician, composer (d. 2001)
  - Jim Marshall, American football player (d. 2025)
  - Paul Stookey, American singer (Peter, Paul and Mary)

== Deaths ==
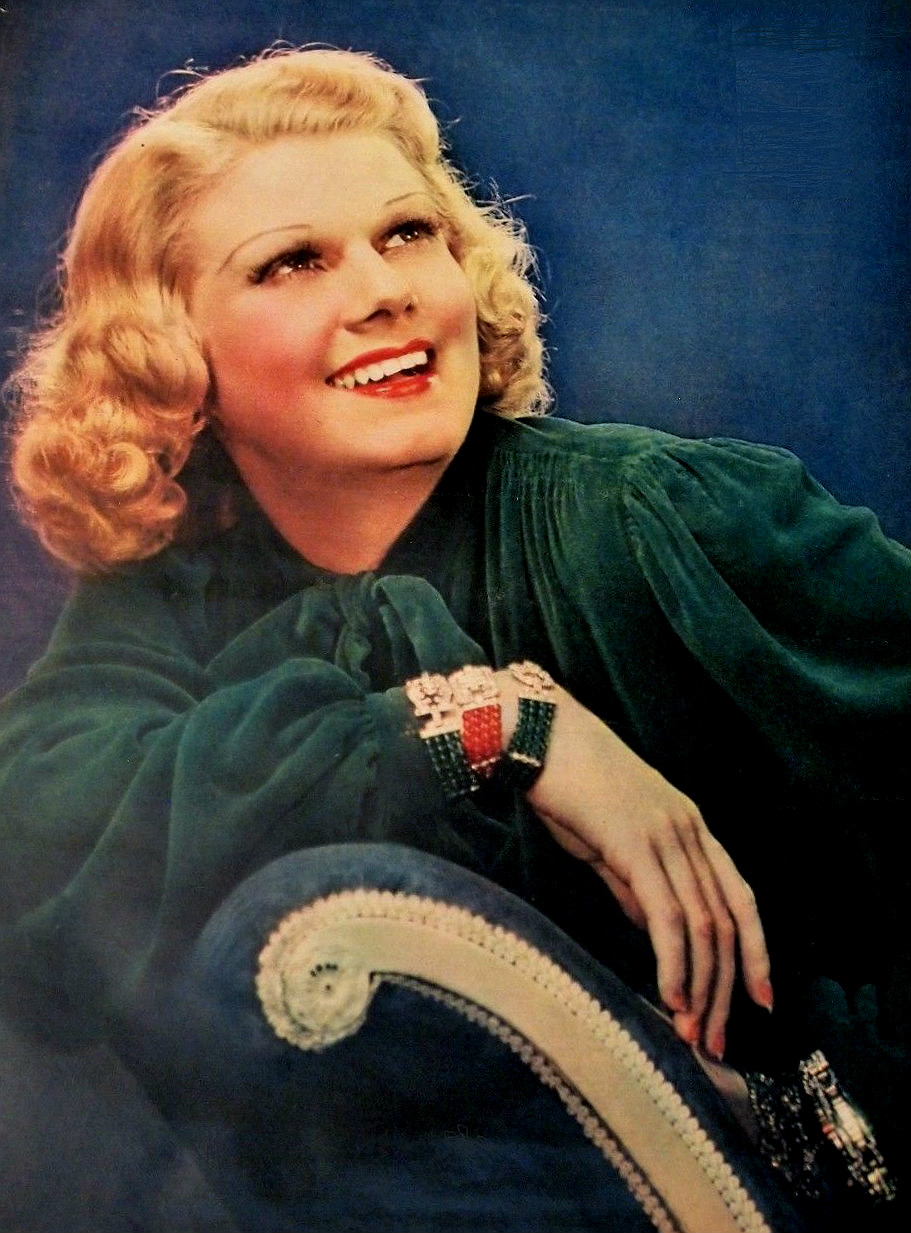
Jean Harlow shortly before her death in 1937

- January 1 – J. Gresham Machen, Presbyterian theologian (born 1881)
- January 2 – Ross Alexander, actor (born 1907)
- January 11 – Emma Amelia Cranmer, prohibition reformer and suffragist (born 1858)
- January 13 – Martin Johnson, adventurer and filmmaker (born 1884)
- January 21 – Marie Provost, actress (born 1896)
- February 7 – Elihu Root, statesman and diplomat, recipient of the Nobel Peace Prize in 1912 (born 1845)
- February 11 – Walter Burley Griffin, architect and town planner (born 1876)
- March 1 – DeWitt Jennings, actor (born 1871)
- March 5 – Jenova Martin, Norwegian-born suffragist and writer (born 1866)
- March 15 – H. P. Lovecraft, horror fiction author (born 1890)
- March 29 – William Edward White, African American baseball player (born 1860)
- April 10 – Ralph Ince, film director (born 1887)
- April 14 – Ned Hanlon, baseball manager (born 1857)
- April 16 – Jay Johnson Morrow, military engineer and politician, 3rd Governor of the Panama Canal Zone (born 1870)
- May 14 – John Burke, 24th Treasurer of the United States (born 1859)
- May 23 – John D. Rockefeller, oil industry business magnate and philanthropist (born 1839)
- June 7 – Jean Harlow, actress and sex symbol (born 1911)
- July 2 – Amelia Earhart, aviator, missing on flight (born 1897)
- July 9 – Oliver Law, labor organizer and Army officer, killed in Spanish Civil War (born 1899)
- July 11 – George Gershwin, popular composer (born 1898)
- July 14 – Joseph Taylor Robinson, politician (born 1872)
- July 29 – Ella Maria Ballou, writer (born 1852)
- August 11 – Edith Wharton, novelist (born 1862)
- August 21 – Hannah J. Patterson, suffragist and social activist (born 1879)
- August 27 – Andrew Mellon, banker and Secretary of the Treasury (born 1855)
- September 8 – Anna Hempstead Branch, poet (born 1875)
- September 11 – Loraine Wyman, folk singer and dulcimer player (born 1885)
- September 13 – Ellis Parker Butler, humorist (born 1869)
- September 21 – Osgood Perkins, actor (born 1892)
- September 22 – Ruth Roland, actress (born 1892)
- September 26 – Bessie Smith, African American blues singer (born 1894)
- September 29 – Ray Ewry, field athlete (born 1873)
- October 6 – Blind Uncle Gaspard, Cajun musician (born 1880)
- October 22 – George Horace Lorimer, newspaper editor (born 1867)
- November 6 – Colin Campbell Cooper, painter (born 1856)
- November 25 – Raymond Stanton Patton, admiral (born 1882)
- November 30 – James O. McKinsey, accountant and pioneer of management consulting (born 1889)
- December 6 – Florence Griswold, curator (born 1850)
- December 21
  - Ted Healy, vaudeville actor (born 1896)
  - Frank B. Kellogg, United States Secretary of State, recipient of the Nobel Peace Prize in 1929 (born 1856)
- December 25 – Newton D. Baker, United States Secretary of War (born 1871)
- December 29 – Don Marquis, poet (born 1878)
- Undated
  - Redoshi, penultimate survivor of the transatlantic slave trade (born c. 1848 in West Africa)

== See also ==
- List of American films of 1937
- Timeline of United States history (1930–1949)
