= Lewellen (surname) =

Lewellen is a surname. Notable people with the surname include:

- Hope Lewellen (born 1967), American Paralympic volleyball player
- John M. Lewellen (1930–2017), American politician
- Jonathan Lewellen, American economist
- Royce R. Lewellen, American judge
- Ted C. Lewellen (1940–2006), American anthropologist
- Verne Lewellen (1901–1980), American football player and executive
- Wayne Lewellen (1944–2009), American film distribution executive and producer
- Wilhelmina Lewellen (born 1937), American politician

== See also ==
- Luellen, another surname
