= Luellen =

Luellen is a surname. Notable people with the surname include:

- Joshua Howard Luellen (born 1989), professionally known as Southside, American record producer, songwriter, and rapper
- Tyler Luellen (born 1984), American football player

== See also ==
- Lewellen (surname), another surname
