= Ted C. Lewellen =

American writer (1940–2006)

Theodore "Ted" Charles Lewelllen (June 26, 1940 – April 30, 2006) was Professor of Anthropology at the University of Richmond. He received his B.A. from Alaska Methodist University, his M.A. from New York University, and his Ph.D. from the University of Colorado Boulder in 1977, with a thesis on "The Aymara in transition : economy and religion in a Peruvian peasant community".

He has done field work in Peru and Nicaragua and is the author of four books, some of which have been translated into Korean, French, Spanish, and Italian. and about 20 articles. His best known are The Anthropology of Globalization (2002), and his textbook, Political Anthropology: an Introduction, which has gone into three editions.

He served in the United States Army from 1964 to 1966 and was in the 11th Air Assault Division in Fort Benning, Georgia.

== Works ==
=== Books ===
- Lewellen, Ted C. Political Anthropology: An Introduction. 3rd ed. Westport, Connecticut: Praeger, 2003. ISBN 978-0-89789-891-1
- Lewellen, Ted C. Political Anthropology: An Introduction. 2d ed South Hadley, Massachusetts: Bergin & Garvey,. 1983. ISBN 978-0-89789-029-8

According to WorldCat, held in 791 libraries

Review by John A Wiseman in Man, September, 1985, volume 20, number 3, pages 576–577
Review by George D Westermark; in Anthropological Quarterly, April, 1985, volume 58, number 2, pages 86–87

  - Spanish translation: Lewellen, Ted C. Introducción a la antropología política. Barcelona: Bellaterra, 1985. OCLC 434641428
  - Italian translation, Lewellen, Ted C. Antropologia politica. Bologna: Il Mulino, 1995. ISBN 978-88-15-03670-4
  - Korean Translation: 류웰린 원저; 한 경구, 임 봉길 공역. 한 경구. 임 봉길.; Ted C Lewellen; Kyŏng-gu Han; Pong-gil Im / Lewellen, Ted C., Kyŏng-gu Han, and Pong-gil Im. 정치 인류학 / Chŏngchʻi illyuhak. Sŏul Tʻŭkpyŏlsi: Ilchogak, 1998. ISBN 978-89-337-0328-1
- Lewellen, Ted C. The Anthropology of Globalization: Cultural Anthropology Enters the 21st Century. Westport, Conn: Bergin & Garvey, 2002. ISBN 978-0-313-01284-6 According to WorldCat, held in 1261 libraries

Review by Don Kalb; American Anthropologist, June, 2004, volume 106, number 2, pages 413–414

- Lewellen, Ted C. Dependency and Development: An Introduction to the Third World. Westport, Connecticut: Bergin & Garvey, 1995. ISBN 978-0-89789-400-5

Review by James W Vining; The Journal of Developing Areas, April, 1996, volume 30, number 3, pages 394–395
Review by Kenneth P Jameson Economic development and cultural change. 46, number 3, (1998): page 644
Review by James W Vining The Journal of Developing Areas. 30, number 3, (1996): page 394

- Lewellen, Ted C. Peasants in Transition: The Changing Economy of the Peruvian Aymara : a General Systems Approach. Boulder, Colorado: Westview Press, 1978. ISBN 978-0-89158-076-8

Review by Hans C Buechler;Man, December, 1979, volume 14, number 4, pages 762–763

== peer-reviewed articles ==
(partial list):

- Lewellen, Ted C. "Holy and Unholy Alliances: The Politics of Catholicism in Revolutionary Nicaragua." Journal of Church and State. Volume 31, number 1 (winter 1989). pages 15–33
- Lewellen, Ted C. 1990. "State Terror and the Disruption of Internal Adaptations by CIA Covert Actions". Scandinavian Journal of Development Alternatives. -. 923: pages 47–65.
- Lewellen, Ted C. 1986. "The Lie File: The Political Manipulation of Central American Data by the Reagan Administration, 1981-1984". Scandinavian Journal of Development Alternatives. -. 51: pages 29–49.
- Lewellen, Ted C. 1979. "Deviant Religion and Cultural Evolution: The Aymara Case". Journal for the Scientific Study of Religion. 18, number 3:.
- Lewellen, Ted C., et al. 1981. "Aggression and Hypoglycemia in the Andes: Another Look at the Evidence [and Comments and Replies]". Current Anthropology. 22, number 4: pages 347–361.
- Lewellen, Ted C. 1997 "Tropical Deforestation: The Human Dimension:" American Anthropologist, volume 99 number 3 (199709): pages 643–643
