= John Walker (Arkansas politician) =

American politician (1937–2019)

Member of the Arkansas House of Representatives from the 34th district
- In office January 2011 – October 28, 2019
- Preceded by: Wilhelmina Lewellen
- Succeeded by: Joy Springer (elect)

Personal details
- Born: John Winfred Walker; June 3, 1937 Hope, Arkansas, U.S.
- Died: October 28, 2019 (aged 82) Little Rock, Arkansas, U.S.
- Party: Democratic
- Children: 5
- Education: University of Arkansas at Pine Bluff; New York University; Yale Law School
- Profession: Attorney

John Winfred Walker (June 3, 1937 – October 28, 2019) was an American politician and a Democratic member of the Arkansas House of Representatives representing District 34 from January 2011 until his death.

== Life and career ==
John W. Walker was born in Hope, Arkansas, where he attended Yerger High School until 1952. In 1965, Walker began the general practice of law in Little Rock, Arkansas with the emphasis on civil rights. In 1968, he opened one of the first three racially integrated law firms in the south, first known as Walker and Chachkin. Between 1965 and his death in 2019, Walker was personally involved in most of the reported cases which involve racial discrimination in the state of Arkansas. Many of them are landmark having created new law and opened doors to school houses and work places throughout the state of Arkansas and surrounding states. One case took his time since 1965, the Little Rock school case started by the late Wiley A Branton and LDF general counsel/later Supreme Court Justice Thurgood Marshall. Many of Walker's early cases involved classes of people discriminated against by mega corporate environments due to their race. A recent case of Walker's was the only nationwide racial discrimination case ever successfully prosecuted against Wal-Mart. It involved a class of African American truck drivers.

He died at his home in Little Rock on October 28, 2019, at the age of 82.

== Education ==
Walker graduated from Jack Yates High School in Houston, Texas, in 1954. He was the first African American undergraduate student admitted to the University of Texas after the Brown decision in 1954 but was not allowed to attend for racial reasons. In 1958, he graduated from Arkansas AM&N College in Pine Bluff, Arkansas, with a degree in Sociology; in 1961 he received a master's degree from New York University; and in 1964 he received a law degree from Yale University in New Haven, Connecticut. Walker's first work was as an attorney with the NAACP Legal Defense Fund (LDF) in New York. He remained associated as a cooperating attorney and later as a member of the Board of LDF.

== Elections ==
- 2010 When House District 34 Representative Wilhelmina Lewellen retired from the legislature, leaving the seat open, Walker placed first in the May 18, 2010, Democratic primary with 1,461 votes (46.1%), won the June 8 runoff election with 1,611 votes (56.3%), and won the November 2, 2010 general election with 4,418 votes (76.4%) against Republican nominee Carolyn Smith.
- 2012 Walker was unopposed for both the May 22, 2012 Democratic primary and the November 6, 2012 General election.
