= Vernon Taylor =

American rockabilly musician (1937–2026)

- Born: Walton Alderton; November 9, 1937; Layhill, Maryland, U.S.
- Died: July 12, 2026 (aged 88)

Walton Alderton (November 9, 1937 – July 12, 2026), better known as Vernon Taylor, was an American rockabilly musician.

== Background ==
Walton Alderton was born in Layhill, Maryland, on November 9, 1937, into a Baptist family. He was the youngest of four children and at age 11 his family moved to Spencerville, Maryland, where he learned to play the guitar.

At the age of 15 he formed his first band (The Nighthawks) with two high school classmates and by 1956 they were a five- piece band called The Nighthawks.

Taylor died on July 12, 2026, at the age of 88, after a long illness with dementia.

== Career ==
The band received their first break while in high school, playing between sets for Curley Smith, who was later a member of the rock band Boston. The Nighthawks went on to perform in an hour-long Saturday night TV show on WTTG channel 5 out of Washington, D.C., from 1957 to 1960. During this time Taylor signed to Dot Records in 1957. After releasing two singles, "Losing Game"/ "I've Got the Blues" (Dot 15632) and "Why Must You Leave Me" which did not sell either Dot Records cancelled his contract.

Taylor then signed with Sun Records after Sam Phillips.had seen him perform on American Bandstand. On October 27, 1958, Vernon recorded the single "Today Is A Blue Day"/"Breeze" (Sun 310) The second Sun single (325) was released on August 15, 1959, and after neither song was successful Taylor ended his music career, dedicating himself to his family and a career in business.

In 1989 Taylor returned to music playing at a benefit concert for Charlie Feathers, which led to a comeback career. He has since performed in the United Kingdom and had a re-release of his Sun and Dot material on Germany's Eagle Records. In 1999, Run Wild Records released a 12-song CD of newly-recorded material by Vernon, titled "Daddy's Rockin'".

== Discography ==
Year	Title	Record Label
1957	"I’ve Got The Blues" / "Losing Game"	Dot Records
1958	"Why Must You Leave Me" / "Satisfaction Guaranteed"	Dot Records
1958	"Today Is A Blue Day" / "Breeze"	Sun Records
1959	"Mystery Train" / "Sweet and Easy Love"	Sun Records
	"Your Lovin' Man"; "Blue Day Tomorrow"; "This Kind of Love"; "Hey Little Girl"; "What Would I Do Without You"	Sun Records (not issued)
	"All They Wanna Do Is Stroll"; "Dinah Lee"; "Why Must You Leave Me"	not issued
