= Wilhelmina Lewellen =

American politician (born 1937)

Member of the Arkansas House of Representatives from the 34th district
- In office January 10, 2005 – January 10, 2011
- Preceded by: John M. Lewellen
- Succeeded by: John Walker

Personal details
- Born: December 9, 1937 (age 88) Woodson, Arkansas
- Party: Democratic

Wilhelmina Lewellen (born December 9, 1937) is an American politician who served in the Arkansas House of Representatives from the 34th district from 2005 to 2011.
