= John M. Lewellen =

American politician

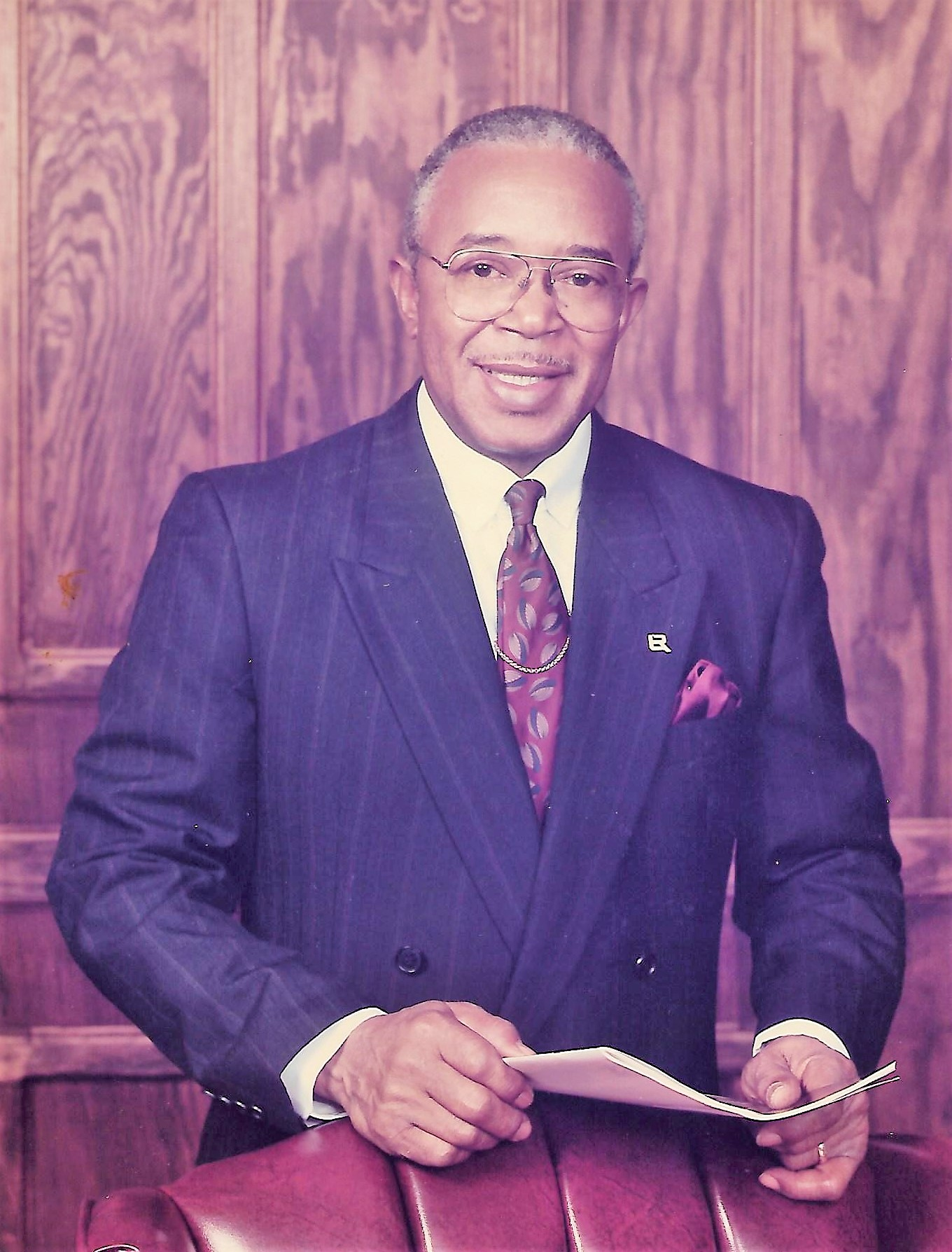
John M. Lewellen

Member of the Arkansas House of Representatives from the 34th district
- In office 1999–2004
- Succeeded by: Wilhelmina Epps Lewellen

Personal details
- Born: September 16, 1930 Forrest City, Arkansas
- Died: November 25, 2017 (aged 87) Little Rock, Arkansas
- Resting place: Pinecrest Memorial Park
- Party: Democratic
- Spouse: Wilhelmina Epps Lewellen
- Children: Ivie Lewellen Clay Connie Lewellen Biddle

John M. Lewellen (September 16, 1930 – November 25, 2017) was an American politician who served on the Little Rock City board of directors, the Pulaski County Quorum Court, and in the Arkansas state legislature. He was a member of the Arkansas House of Representatives from 1999 to 2004. After his tenure, his wife, Wilhelmina Lewellen, succeeded him and served until 2010. Lewellen is notable for being the only Arkansas official elected to represent his district at the city, county, and state levels.

== Early life and education ==
Lewellen was born on September 16, 1930, in Forrest City, Arkansas. He was the eleventh of thirteen children born to Cornelius and Jesse Lewellen. He attended Dansby Elementary School and professed faith in Christianity at an early age. He graduated from Lincoln High School in Forrest City and served in the United States Air Force from 1951 to 1955 during the Korean War. Lewellen was the first in his family to attend college, enrolling at Arkansas AM&N (now the University of Arkansas at Pine Bluff). There, he met Wilhelmina Epps, whom he married in 1956. They had two daughters, Ivie Rochelle and Cornelia Ann, while they completed their college education.

== Professional career ==
After graduating in 1958 with a bachelor's degree in agriculture, Lewellen moved with his family to the Altheimer/Hermitage area, where he worked as a high school teacher and principal. He later moved to Little Rock, where he began a 30-year career in state government, serving as a state probation officer, state rehabilitation counselor, and a contract officer for the Arkansas Department of Human Services.

== Political career ==
Lewellen was elected to the Little Rock City Board in 1991 and to the Pulaski County Quorum Court in 1996. In 1999, he was elected to the Arkansas House of Representatives and represented District 34 for six years. During his tenure, he co-founded the Democratic Black Caucus, chaired the Children and Youth subcommittee, and advocated for the growth of minority- and women-owned businesses. He was also the lead sponsor of House Bill 1923, which created the Mosaic Templars of America Center for African-American Culture and Business Enterprise. This legislation secured more than $5 million to restore the Mosaic Templars Cultural Center, a museum housing the Arkansas Black Hall of Fame and a collection of African American artifacts. The center is part of the Arkansas Black Heritage Tour and is the state's only publicly funded museum of African American history.

== Community involvement ==
Lewellen was a respected member of the Little Rock community, purchasing and renovating apartments and homes, and co-founding the Wright Avenue Neighborhood Association. He also mentored youths in the community and supported local development projects. He remained an active member of various organizations, including Alpha Phi Alpha, the NAACP, and Sigma Pi Phi.

== Personal life and legacy ==
Lewellen was married to Wilhelmina for 61 years. After a lengthy illness, he died on November 25, 2017, which coincided with their wedding anniversary.

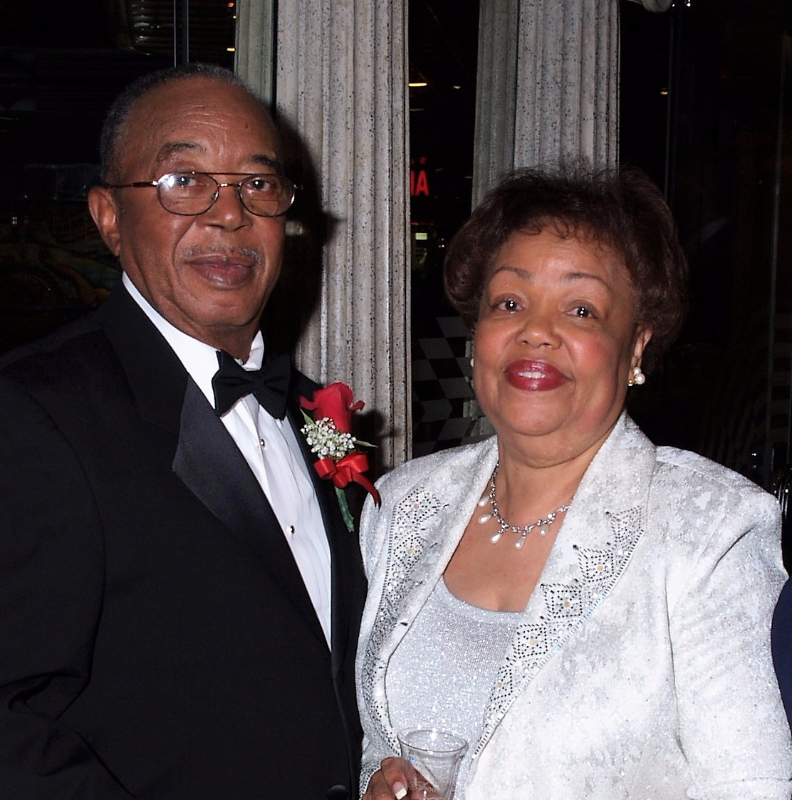
Rep. John Lewellen and Rep. Wilhelmina Lewellen
