= Dick Hafer (comics) =

American comics artist

Dick Hafer (July 20, 1937 – July 5, 2003) was an American comics artist. He is best known for his Christian and conservative comics with strong political and anti-extramarital sexuality views.

Hafer wrote about 70 comics. Although he is known most for his controversial political comics, Hafer covered a wide variety of topics: from church life (Church Chuckles), to model railroads (Sometimes You Gotta Compromise: A Light-Hearted Look at Model Railroading--And Model Railroaders), to dog ownership (So You Want a Dog: Questionable Answers to Your Questions About Doggie Ownership).

Hafer is best known for his conservative social and religious views. One of his most controversial comics was the 1986 anti-homosexual comic Homosexuality: Legitimate, Alternative Deathstyle. One of his best selling works was I Know That We're a Throw-Away Society, but This is Ridiculous!, an anti-abortion pamphlet published 1988. He also specifically targeted politicians of the Democratic Party: he parodied Ted Kennedy in Every Family Has One: Little Black Sheep (1982), and Michael Dukakis in Magical Mike (1988).
