= 2007 in the United States =

- Decades: 1980s; 1990s; 2000s; 2010s; 2020s
- See also: History of the United States (1991–2016); Timeline of United States history (1990–2009); List of years in the United States

Events from the year 2007 in the United States.

== Incumbents ==
=== Federal government ===
- President: George W. Bush (R-Texas)
- Vice President: Dick Cheney (R-Wyoming)
- Chief Justice: John Roberts (Maryland)
- Speaker of the House of Representatives:

Dennis Hastert (R-Illinois) (until January 3)
Nancy Pelosi (D-California) (starting January 4)

- Senate Majority Leader:

Bill Frist (R-Tennessee) (until January 3)
Harry Reid (D–Nevada) (starting January 3)

- Congress: 109th (until January 3), 110th (starting January 3)

==== State governments ====
Governors and lieutenant governors

=== Governors ===
- Governor of Alabama: Bob Riley (Republican)
- Governor of Alaska: Sarah Palin (Republican)
- Governor of Arizona: Janet Napolitano (Democratic)
- Governor of Arkansas: Mike Huckabee (Republican) (until January 9), Mike Beebe (Democratic) (starting January 9)
- Governor of California: Arnold Schwarzenegger (Republican)
- Governor of Colorado: Bill Owens (Republican) (until January 9), Bill Ritter (Democratic) (starting January 9)
- Governor of Connecticut: Jodi Rell (Republican)
- Governor of Delaware: Ruth Ann Minner (Democratic)
- Governor of Florida: Jeb Bush (Republican) (until January 2), Charlie Crist (Republican)/(Independent) (starting January 2)
- Governor of Georgia: Sonny Perdue (Republican)
- Governor of Hawaii: Linda Lingle (Republican)
- Governor of Idaho: Butch Otter (Republican)
- Governor of Illinois: Rod Blagojevich (Democratic)
- Governor of Indiana: Mitch Daniels (Republican)
- Governor of Iowa: Tom Vilsack (Democratic) (until January 12), Chet Culver (Democratic) (starting January 12)
- Governor of Kansas: Kathleen Sebelius (Democratic)
- Governor of Kentucky: Ernie Fletcher (Republican) (until December 11), Steve Beshear (Democratic) (starting December 11)
- Governor of Louisiana: Kathleen Blanco (Democratic)
- Governor of Maine: John Baldacci (Democratic)
- Governor of Maryland: Bob Ehrlich (Republican) (until January 17), Martin O'Malley (Democratic) (starting January 17)
- Governor of Massachusetts: Mitt Romney (Republican) (until January 4), Deval Patrick (Democratic) (starting January 4)
- Governor of Michigan: Jennifer Granholm (Democratic)
- Governor of Minnesota: Tim Pawlenty (Republican)
- Governor of Mississippi: Haley Barbour (Republican)
- Governor of Missouri: Matt Blunt (Republican)
- Governor of Montana: Brian Schweitzer (Democratic)
- Governor of Nebraska: Dave Heineman (Republican)
- Governor of Nevada: Jim Gibbons (Republican)
- Governor of New Hampshire: John Lynch (Democratic)
- Governor of New Jersey: Jon Corzine (Democratic)
- Governor of New Mexico: Bill Richardson (Democratic)
- Governor of New York: Eliot Spitzer (Democratic)
- Governor of North Carolina: Mike Easley (Democratic)
- Governor of North Dakota: John Hoeven (Republican)
- Governor of Ohio: Bob Taft (Republican) (until January 8), Ted Strickland (Democratic) (starting January 8)
- Governor of Oklahoma: Brad Henry (Democratic)
- Governor of Oregon: Ted Kulongoski (Democratic)
- Governor of Pennsylvania: Ed Rendell (Democratic)
- Governor of Rhode Island: Donald Carcieri (Republican)
- Governor of South Carolina: Mark Sanford (Republican)
- Governor of South Dakota: Mike Rounds (Republican)
- Governor of Tennessee: Phil Bredesen (Democratic)
- Governor of Texas: Rick Perry (Republican)
- Governor of Utah: Jon Huntsman Jr. (Republican)
- Governor of Vermont: Jim Douglas (Republican)
- Governor of Virginia: Tim Kaine (Democratic)
- Governor of Washington: Christine Gregoire (Democratic)
- Governor of West Virginia: Joe Manchin (Democratic)
- Governor of Wisconsin: Jim Doyle (Democratic)
- Governor of Wyoming: Dave Freudenthal (Democratic)

=== Lieutenant governors ===
- Lieutenant Governor of Alabama: Lucy Baxley (Democratic) (until January 15), Jim Folsom Jr. (Democratic) (starting January 15)
- Lieutenant Governor of Alaska: Sean Parnell (Republican)
- Lieutenant Governor of Arkansas: vacant (until January 9), Bill Halter (Democratic) (starting January 9)
- Lieutenant Governor of California: Cruz Bustamante (Democratic) (until January 8), John Garamendi (Democratic) (starting January 8)
- Lieutenant Governor of Colorado: Jane Norton (Republican) (until January 9), Barbara O'Brien (Democratic) (starting January 9)
- Lieutenant Governor of Connecticut: Kevin B. Sullivan (Democratic) (until January 3), Michael Fedele (Republican) (starting January 3)
- Lieutenant Governor of Delaware: John Carney (Democratic)
- Lieutenant Governor of Florida: Toni Jennings (Republican) (until January 2), Jeff Kottkamp (Republican) (starting January 2)
- Lieutenant Governor of Georgia: Mark Taylor (Democratic) (until January 8), Casey Cagle (Republican) (starting January 8)
- Lieutenant Governor of Hawaii: Duke Aiona (Republican)
- Lieutenant Governor of Idaho: Jim Risch (Republican)
- Lieutenant Governor of Illinois: Pat Quinn (Democratic)
- Lieutenant Governor of Indiana: Becky Skillman (Republican)
- Lieutenant Governor of Iowa: Sally Pederson (Democratic) (until January 17), Patty Judge (Democratic) (starting January 17)
- Lieutenant Governor of Kansas: John E. Moore (Democratic) (until January 20), Mark Parkinson (Democratic) (starting January 20)
- Lieutenant Governor of Kentucky: Steve Pence (Republican) (until December 11), Daniel Mongiardo (Democratic) (starting December 11)
- Lieutenant Governor of Louisiana: Mitch Landrieu (Democratic)
- Lieutenant Governor of Maryland: Michael Steele (Republican) (until January 17), Anthony Brown (Democratic) (starting January 17)
- Lieutenant Governor of Massachusetts: Kerry Healey (Republican) (until January 4), Tim Murray (Democratic) (starting January 4)
- Lieutenant Governor of Michigan: John D. Cherry (Democratic)
- Lieutenant Governor of Minnesota: Carol Molnau (Republican)
- Lieutenant Governor of Mississippi: Amy Tuck (Republican)
- Lieutenant Governor of Missouri: Peter Kinder (Republican)
- Lieutenant Governor of Montana: John Bohlinger (Republican)
- Lieutenant Governor of Nebraska: Rick Sheehy (Republican)
- Lieutenant Governor of Nevada: Lorraine Hunt (Republican) (until January 20), Brian Krolicki (Republican) (starting January 20)
- Lieutenant Governor of New Mexico: Diane Denish (Democratic)
- Lieutenant Governor of New York: David Paterson (Democratic)
- Lieutenant Governor of North Carolina: Bev Perdue (Democratic)
- Lieutenant Governor of North Dakota: Jack Dalrymple (Republican)
- Lieutenant Governor of Ohio: vacant (until January 8), Lee Fisher (Democratic) (starting January 8)
- Lieutenant Governor of Oklahoma: Mary Fallin (Republican) (until January 2), Jari Askins (Democratic) (starting January 2)
- Lieutenant Governor of Pennsylvania: Catherine Baker Knoll (Democratic)
- Lieutenant Governor of Rhode Island: Charles J. Fogarty (Democratic) (until January 2), Elizabeth H. Roberts (Democratic) (starting January 2)
- Lieutenant Governor of South Carolina: André Bauer (Republican)
- Lieutenant Governor of South Dakota: Dennis Daugaard (Republican)
- Lieutenant Governor of Tennessee: John S. Wilder (Democratic) (until January 8), Ron Ramsey (Republican) (starting January 8)
- Lieutenant Governor of Texas: David Dewhurst (Republican)
- Lieutenant Governor of Utah: Gary Herbert (Republican)
- Lieutenant Governor of Vermont: Brian Dubie (Republican)
- Lieutenant Governor of Virginia: Bill Bolling (Republican)
- Lieutenant Governor of Washington: Brad Owen (Democratic)
- Lieutenant Governor of Wisconsin: Barbara Lawton (Democratic)

== Events ==
=== January ===
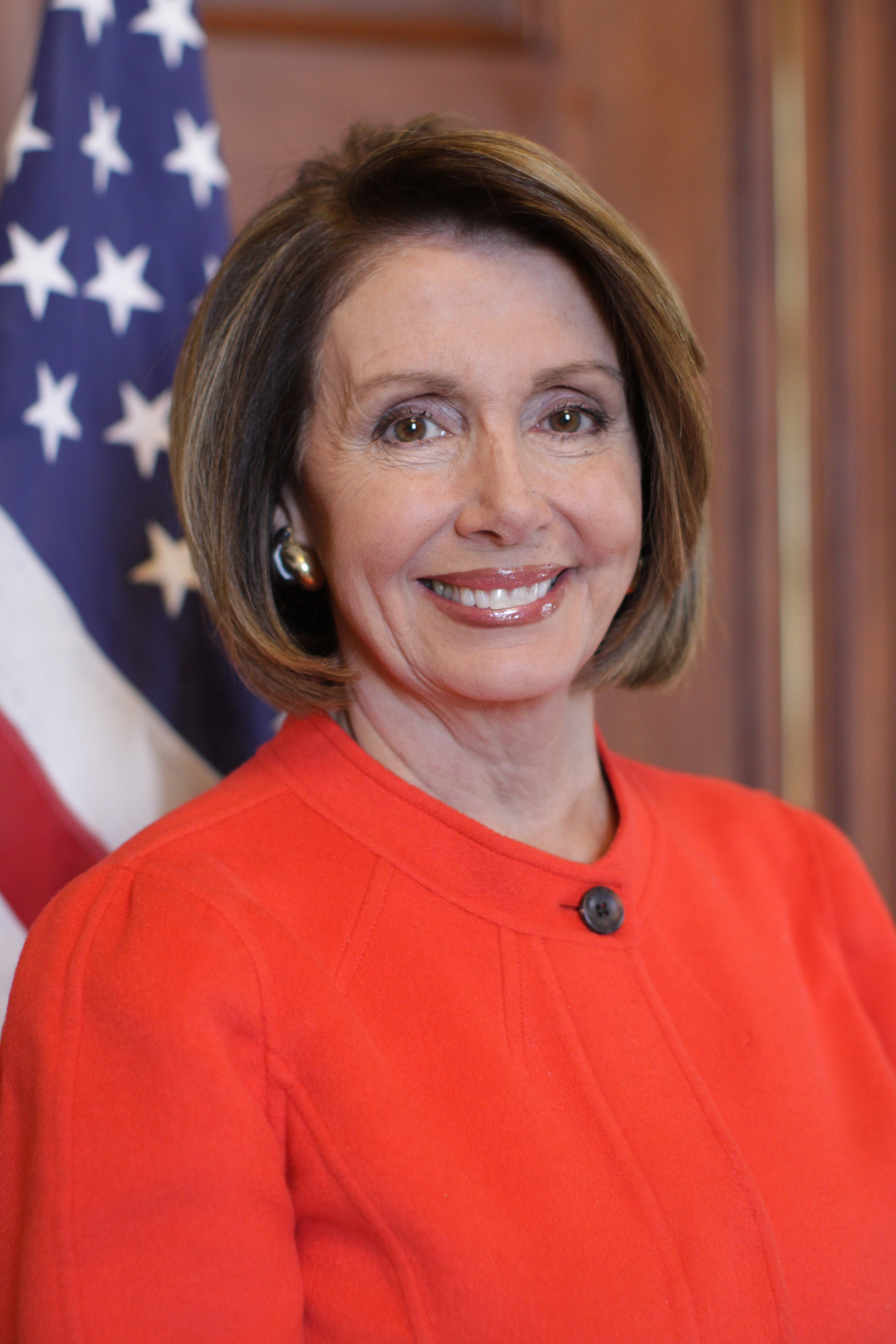
January 4: Nancy Pelosi becomes Speaker of the House.

- January 4
  - William J. Fallon succeeds Gen. John Abizaid as the head of Central Command in Iraq.
  - Nancy Pelosi becomes the first female Speaker of the United States House of Representatives.
- January 7 – World Wrestling Entertainment holds its New Year's Revolution pay-per-view event from the Kemper Arena in Kansas City, Missouri.
- January 9
  - War in Somalia: U.S. warplanes conduct air strikes in Somalia against suspected terrorists.
  - Steve Jobs publicly announces the first iPhone, set to release in June.
- January 10 – The Iraq War troop surge begins.
- January 12 – The U.S. Embassy in Athens is attacked with a rocket propelled grenade, which causes minimal damage and no injuries.
- January 23 – George W. Bush delivers his sixth State of the Union Address.
- January 28
  - A battle between insurgents and U.S.-backed Iraqi troops kills 300 suspected resistance members in Najaf, Iraq.
  - World Wrestling Entertainment holds its Royal Rumble pay-per-view event from the AT&T Center in San Antonio, Texas.
- January 30
  - Microsoft releases Windows Vista and Office 2007.
  - A convenience store in Ghent, West Virginia, explodes due to a propane leak, killing four people and injuring several others.
- January 31
  - Delta Air Lines creditors officially reject US Airways' hostile takeover bid.
  - The Mooninite scare occurs in Boston when devices used in a guerrilla marketing campaign for the animated television series Aqua Teen Hunger Force are mistaken for improvised explosive devices.

=== February ===
- February 2 – A tornado in central Florida kills 21 people.
- February 4 – Super Bowl XLI: The Indianapolis Colts defeat the Chicago Bears 29–17 at Dolphin Stadium in Miami Gardens for their second Super Bowl championship in franchise history, and first since relocating to Indianapolis.
- February 10 – Senator Barack Obama of Illinois declares his candidacy for President of the United States of America.
- February 12 – Gunman Sulejman Talović shoots and kills five people at the Trolley Square Mall in Salt Lake City, Utah, before being killed by police.
- February 18 – World Wrestling Entertainment holds its No Way Out pay-per-view event from the Staples Center in Los Angeles, California.
- February 25 – The 79th Academy Awards ceremony, hosted by Ellen DeGeneres, is held at the Kodak Theatre in Hollywood. Martin Scorsese's The Departed wins four awards, including Best Picture and Best Director. Bill Condon's Dreamgirls leads the nominations with eight. The telecast garners over 39.9 million viewers.
- February 27 – 2007 Bagram Air Base bombing: A Taliban suicide attack at Bagram Air Base while Vice President of the United States Dick Cheney is visiting kills 23, but he is not injured.
- February 28 – The New Horizons space probe performs a gravitational slingshot against Jupiter, which changes its trajectory towards Pluto.

=== March ===
- March 6 – Mega Millions sets a new world record for the highest lottery jackpot of $370 million.
- March 15 – Rebecca Klein is murdered in Villa Park, Illinois by her domestic partner Nicole Abusharif. Klein was bound and suffocated, with the perpetrator standing to benefit from a life insurance payout as a result of the crime.
- March 16 – For the first time in the 23-year history of the modern version of the popular gameshow, Jeopardy!, a three-way tie occurs.
- March 23 – Walt Disney Animation Studios' 47th feature film, Meet the Robinsons, is released to the studio's strongest reception since 2002's Treasure Planet, but is a box office disappointment.

=== April ===
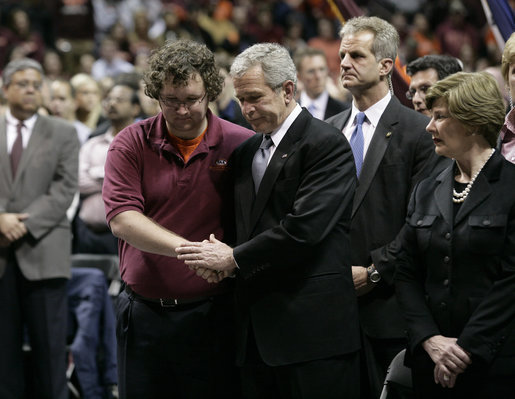
April 16: United States President George W. Bush with Virginia Tech Student Government Association President James Tyger after his speech at the school's convocation.

April 25: President George W. Bush announces the U.S. will increase efforts to combat malaria in Africa.

- April 1 – World Wrestling Entertainment holds WrestleMania 23 at Ford Field in Detroit, Michigan, drawing a crowd of 80,103.
- April 16 – Virginia Tech shooting: Thirty-two people are killed in the Virginia Tech massacre at the Virginia Polytechnic Institute and State University in Blacksburg, Virginia. Gunman Seung-Hui Cho was able to buy his firearms legally, despite having a record of mental illness, causing a large national debate on guns.
- April 19 – U.S. and allied air forces conduct massive exercises over South Korea with over 500 planes.
- April 25
  - The Dow Jones Industrial Average gains 135.95 points to close at 13089.89; its first close above 13,000 in its history.
  - The Burj Khalifa in Dubai reaches the height of the Sears Tower on its way to becoming the tallest building in the world.
  - Congressman Dennis Kucinich introduces articles to impeach Vice President Dick Cheney.
  - President George W. Bush announces the U.S. will increase efforts to combat malaria in Africa.
- April 29 – World Wrestling Entertainment holds its Backlash pay-per-view event from the Philips Arena in Atlanta, Georgia.

=== May ===
- May 3 – The U.S. House of Representatives passes the Matthew Shepard Act. It is the first time that the House brings a gay rights bill to the floor for a vote.
- May 4
  - An EF5 tornado, part of a tornado outbreak, strikes Greensburg, Kansas, killing at least 12 people and destroying about 95% of the town.
  - Executive Directive 51, which specifies the procedures for continuity of the federal government in the event of a "catastrophic emergency," is signed by President George W. Bush.
- May 9 – Subtropical Storm Andrea forms off the coast of Florida, the earliest since Subtropical Storm Ana in 2003.
- May 20 – World Wrestling Entertainment holds its Judgment Day pay-per-view event from the Scottrade Center in St. Louis, Missouri.
- May 31 – A calendar blue moon occurs in the Western Hemisphere and parts of the Eastern Hemisphere.

=== June ===
- June 1 – U.S. warships bombard a Somali village where Islamic militants had set up a base.
- June 2 – Four people are charged with a terror plot to blow up JFK International Airport in New York City.
- June 3 – World Wrestling Entertainment holds its One Night Stand pay-per-view event from the Jacksonville Veterans Memorial Arena in Jacksonville, Florida.
- June 4 – Ten people, including a California National Guard officer and former Hmong general, are charged over plans to overthrow the Laotian Government.
- June 5 – NASA's MESSENGER spacecraft makes its second fly-by of Venus en route to Mercury.
- June 8 – The Space Shuttle Atlantis successfully launches on mission STS-117.
- June 10 – The series finale of The Sopranos airs with its infamous cut-to-black ending.
- June 14 – The San Antonio Spurs sweep the Cleveland Cavaliers to win the 2007 NBA Finals, making this their fourth title win.
- June 15 – The Price Is Right airs its final episode hosted by Bob Barker.
- June 16 – Mike Nifong, district attorney for Durham County, North Carolina, is disbarred for misconduct, having been found guilty of 27 ethics related charges. Nifong withheld evidence that cleared the falsely accused players in the Duke lacrosse case.
- June 18 – Nine Charleston, South Carolina firefighters are killed by a roof collapse while battling the Charleston Sofa Super Store fire.
- June 24
  - In South Lake Tahoe, California, a wildfire destroys 254 homes in the area.
  - World Wrestling Entertainment holds its Vengeance: Night of Champions pay-per-view event from the Toyota Center in Houston, Texas.
- June 25
  - WWE wrestler Chris Benoit, his wife Nancy Benoit, and his son Daniel are found dead as the result of a murder-suicide that took place over the previous weekend.
  - Groundbreaking begins on the supertall Chicago Spire skyscraper. Construction will be suspended in 2008, and the project will ultimately be abandoned.
- June 29
  - The first iPhone is released in the United States.
  - Pixar Animation Studios' eighth feature film, Ratatouille, is released in theaters.
- June 30 – The Hawaii Superferry arrives in Honolulu after a 7,600 mile journey from Mobile, Alabama.

=== July ===
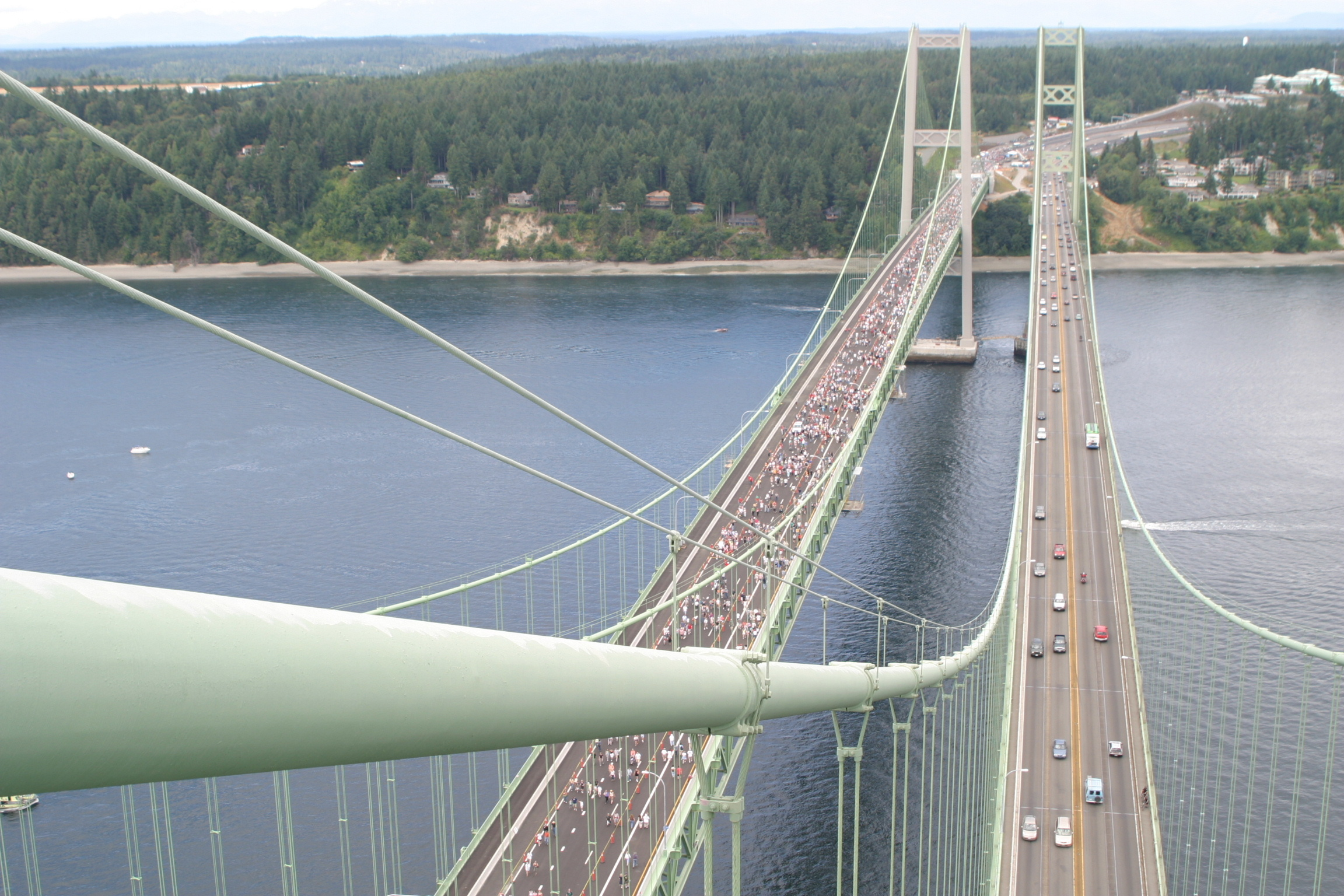
July 15: Opening ceremony of the second Tacoma Narrows Bridge

- July 3 – Transformers, directed by Michael Bay, is released as the first film in the Transformers film series.
- July 7
  - Venus Williams wins the Women's Singles at Wimbledon for a fourth time.
  - Live Earth concerts are held throughout 9 major cities around the world.
- July 8 – Boeing launches the new Boeing 787.
- July 10 – A Cessna 310R twin-engine airplane crashes into two homes in Sanford, Florida, killing three adults and two children.
- July 15 – In Tacoma, Washington, the second span of the Tacoma Narrows Bridge opens to traffic, making it the longest twin suspension bridge in the world.
- July 18 – At the height of rush hour in New York City, a major steam pipe bursts, releasing millions of gallons of boiling water and super heated steam. Only one fatality occurred; a pedestrian who went into cardiac arrest.
- July 19 – The Dow Jones Industrial Average closes above 14,000 for the first time in history.
- July 21 – Vice President Dick Cheney serves a second time as acting president from 7:16 am to 9:21 am EST, while President George W. Bush undergoes a colonoscopy procedure under sedation.
- July 22 – World Wrestling Entertainment holds its The Great American Bash pay-per-view event from the HP Pavilion in San Jose, California.
- July 27
  - The Simpsons Movie is released.
  - Two news helicopters both covering a police chase collide in mid-air over Phoenix, resulting in 4 fatalities (2 people in each helicopter respectively).
- July 31
  - For the United States Army, the role of AIT Platoon Sergeant is initiated.
  - The USDA declares almost every county in Georgia a drought disaster area due to ongoing drought conditions in the region, which have caused crops to fail.

=== August ===
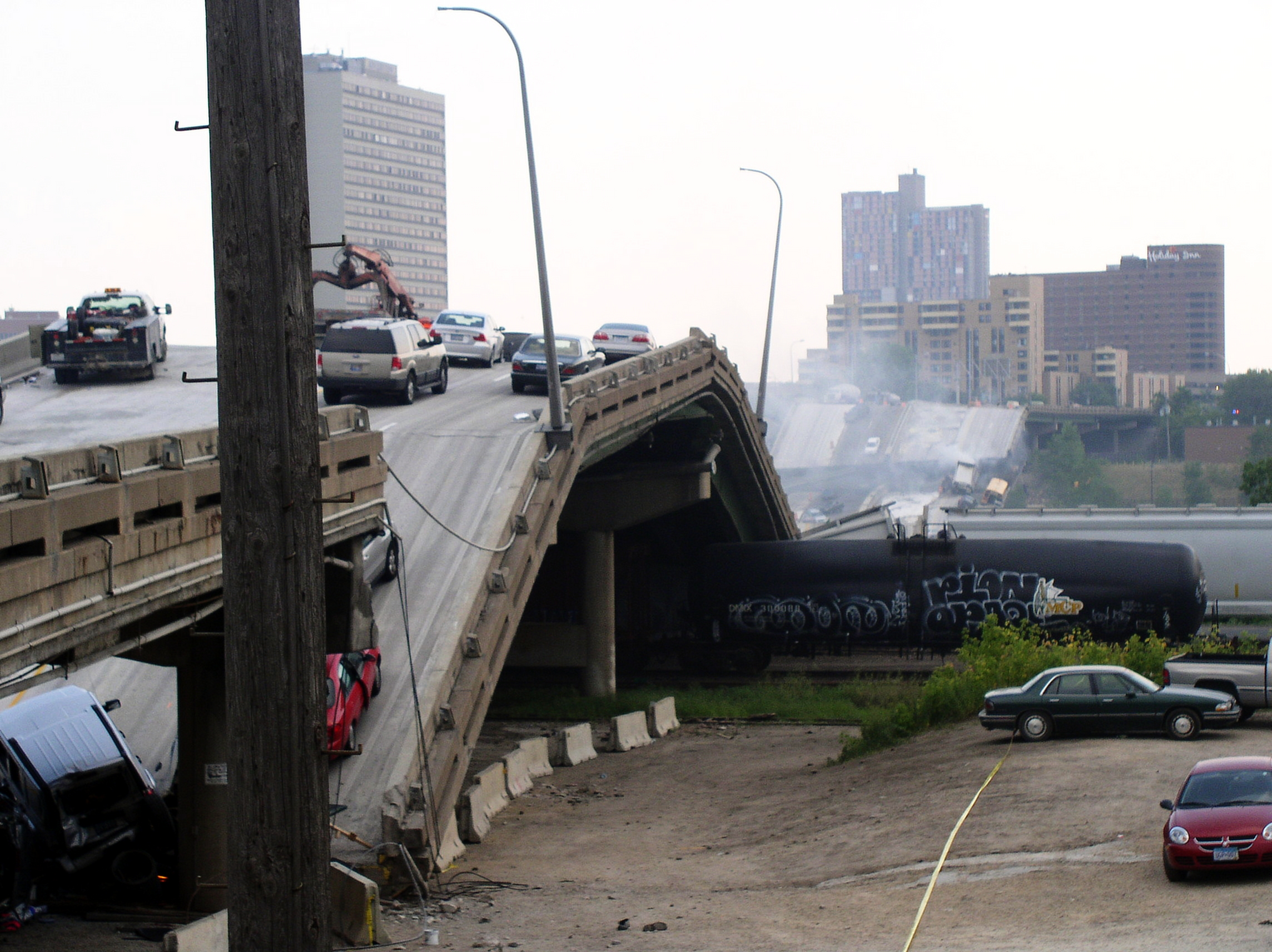
August 1: I-35W Mississippi River bridge collapse.

- August 1
  - The I-35W Mississippi River bridge on Interstate 35W over the Mississippi River in Minneapolis, Minnesota between University Avenue and Washington Avenue collapses at 6:05 p.m. CST during the later part of rush hour, killing 13 people.
  - Scouting celebrates its 100th birthday with worldwide celebrations.
- August 4 – The Phoenix spacecraft launches toward the Martian north pole.
- August 6 – The Crandall Canyon Mine in Emery County, Utah collapses, trapping six miners.
- August 7 – Barry Bonds of the San Francisco Giants breaks Hank Aaron's home run record by hitting his 756th home run in a game against the Washington Nationals.
- August 8 – The Space Shuttle Endeavour is successfully launched on mission STS–118.
- August 9 – The Dow Jones Industrial Average loses 387.18 points, its largest single-day drop since February 27.
- August 12 – Tiger Woods wins the PGA Championship, his 13th career major.
- August 15 – NBA referee Tim Donaghy surrenders to police and pleads guilty to charges brought up by an FBI investigation that he placed bets on games that he refereed.
- August 16 – The Crandall Canyon Mine in Emery County, Utah, collapses a second time, killing three rescue workers and injuring six more.
- August 17 – Phineas and Ferb debuts on Disney Channel.
- August 18 – The remnants of Tropical Storm Erin re-strengthen into a tropical storm over Oklahoma, causing widespread flooding and wind damage.
- August 21 – STS-118 lands at the Kennedy Space Center, completing Space Shuttle Endeavour's 19th flight.
- August 22 – The Texas Rangers score thirty runs in one game, setting the modern (post–1900) MLB record for most runs by one team in a single game, in a 30–3 victory over the Baltimore Orioles.
- August 26 – World Wrestling Entertainment holds its SummerSlam pay-per-view event from the Continental Airlines Arena in East Rutherford, New Jersey.
- August 27 – United States Attorney General Alberto Gonzales announces his resignation, to be effective September 17.
- August 30 – A Boeing B-52 Stratofortress flies from Minot Air Force Base in North Dakota to Barksdale Air Force Base in Louisiana while carrying six nuclear warheads that were mistakenly loaded onto the aircraft.

=== September ===
- September 8 – iCarly debuts on Nickelodeon.
- September 15 – Over 3,000 Taiwanese Americans and their supporters rally in front of the United Nations building in New York City to demand that the UN accept Taiwan as a member. At the same time, over 300,000 Taiwanese people rally in Taiwan to make the same plea.
- September 16 – World Wrestling Entertainment holds its Unforgiven pay-per-view event from the FedExForum in Memphis, Tennessee.
- September 24
  - The Oregon State University Mars Rover student-organized project is formed.
  - The Big Bang Theory debuts on CBS and goes on to become one of the most popular sitcoms on television.
- September 25 – Halo 3 is released on Xbox 360, breaking all previous records in entertainment history by generating $170 million during its first 24 hours of release.

=== October ===
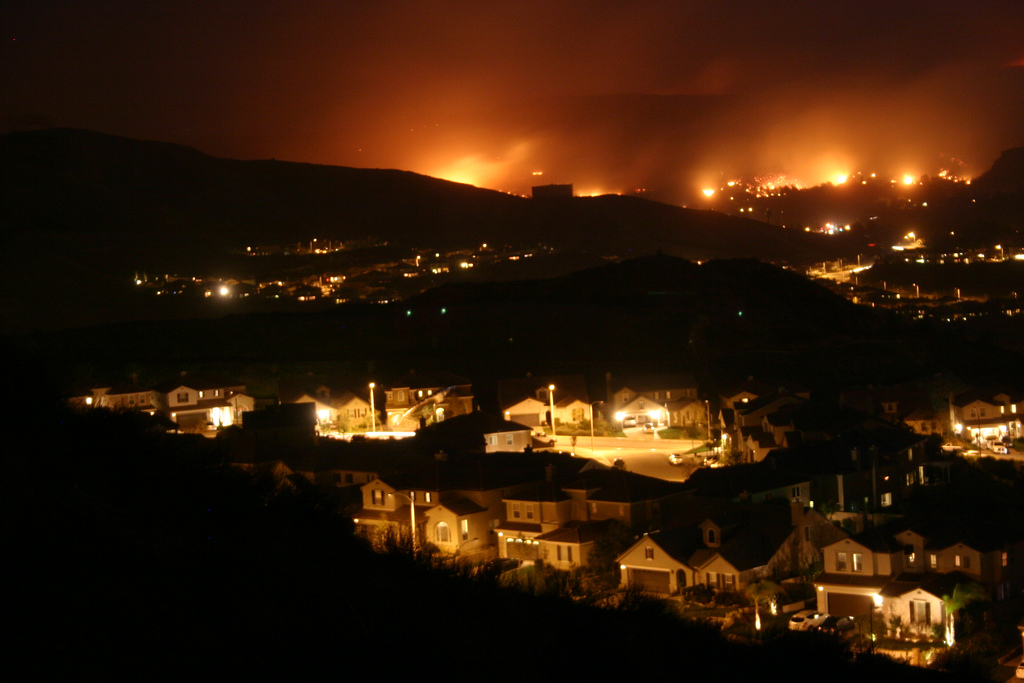
October 20 – November 9: Flames burn Santa Clarita, California during the California wildfires of October 2007.

- October 7
  - Off-duty police officer Tyler Peterson kills six people at a house party in Crandon, Wisconsin before committing suicide.
  - World Wrestling Entertainment holds its No Mercy pay-per-view event from the Allstate Arena in Rosemont, Illinois.
- October 9 – The Dow Jones Industrial Average hits an all-time high of 14,164 before beginning to decline ahead of the start of the late–2000s recession.
- October 10 – The 2007 SuccessTech Academy shooting occurs in Cleveland, Ohio.
- October 15 – Drew Carey debuts as host of The Price Is Right, replacing the retired Bob Barker.
- October 18 – In New York City, one of the world's leading art galleries, the Salander/O'Reilly Galleries, is forced into closure amidst scandal and lawsuits.
- October 20 – Georgia Governor Sonny Perdue declares a state of emergency due to drought conditions.
- October 20–November 9 – Wildfires in Southern California result in the evacuation of more than 1,000,000 people and destroy over 1,600 homes and businesses.
- October 22 – In Missouri, Lisa Montgomery is convicted of murdering pregnant woman Bobbie Jo Stinnett and cutting her baby from her womb. Montgomery is sentenced to death and subsequently executed in 2021.
- October 26 – Apple Inc. launches the sixth major release of their Mac OS X operating system, Mac OS X 10.5 Leopard.
- October 28
  - The Boston Red Sox win the 2007 World Series in a four-game sweep against the Colorado Rockies.
  - World Wrestling Entertainment holds its Cyber Sunday pay-per-view event from the Verizon Center in Washington, D.C..
- October 31 – The World Economic Forum releases the Global Competitiveness Report 2007–2008.

=== November ===
- November 3
  - The DARPA Grand Challenge, a prized competition for driverless cars to navigate safely in traffic, is scheduled.
  - Navy breaks its 43-year losing streak against Notre Dame in overtime, ending the streak of the most consecutive NCAA football wins over one opponent.
- November 4 – Daylight saving time in the United States and most of Canada ends one week later than the previous schedule in accordance with the Energy Policy Act of 2005.
- November 5 – The 2007-08 Writers Guild of America strike begins, leading to major disruptions across the entertainment industry.
- November 6 – Legislative elections are held in Kentucky, Mississippi, New Jersey, and Virginia; Kentucky and Mississippi also hold gubernatorial elections.
- November 8 – The 8th annual Latin Grammy Awards are held at the Mandalay Bay Events Center at Mandalay Bay in Las Vegas.
- November 9 – Miramax Films and Paramount Vantage's No Country for Old Men is released, bringing in $1.2 million on opening day.
- November 18 – World Wrestling Entertainment holds its Survivor Series pay-per-view event from the American Airlines Arena in Miami, Florida.
- November 27 – The Annapolis Conference, a peace conference trying to end the Arab–Israeli conflict, is held in Annapolis, Maryland.

=== December ===
- December
  - The National Intelligence Estimate (NIE) controversially expresses "high confidence" that Iran's nuclear weapons program has not operated since 2003.
  - The late-2000s recession officially begins; the unemployment rate is 5%.
- December 3 – Winter storms bring record amounts of rainfall in the Pacific Northwest, causing flooding and closing a 20-mile portion of Interstate 5 for several days. At least eight deaths and billions of dollars in damages occur in Washington.
- December 4 – The United States Senate approves the Peru Free Trade Agreement.
- December 5 – Robert A. Hawkins shoots eight people dead and injures five at the Westroads Mall in Omaha, Nebraska, then commits suicide.
- December 9 – Matthew Murray goes on a killing spree targeting Christians in Colorado. Murray kills four before being shot by an off-duty police officer. He then commits suicide.
- December 13 – Former U.S. Senator George J. Mitchell publicly releases a report, accusing 89 retired and active Major League Baseball players of anabolic steroid use.
- December 16 – World Wrestling Entertainment holds its Armageddon pay-per-view event from the Mellon Arena in Pittsburgh, Pennsylvania.
- December 19 – An explosion and fire at the T2 Laboratories facility in Jacksonville, Florida kills four and injures 14.
- December 20
  - In the race for the Republican presidential nomination, Tom Tancredo withdraws and endorses Mitt Romney.
  - A group of activist Lakota people send a letter to the Department of State, declaring their secession from the Union as the Republic of Lakotah.
- December 25 – An escaped tiger kills one person and injures two others at the San Francisco Zoo.
- December 29 – The New England Patriots become the first team in NFL history to complete a perfect season under the 16-game format, as they defeat the New York Giants 38–35 at Giants Stadium in East Rutherford, New Jersey.

=== Ongoing ===
- War in Afghanistan (2001–2021)
- Iraq War (2003–2011)
- Late-2000s recession (2007–2009)

== Births ==
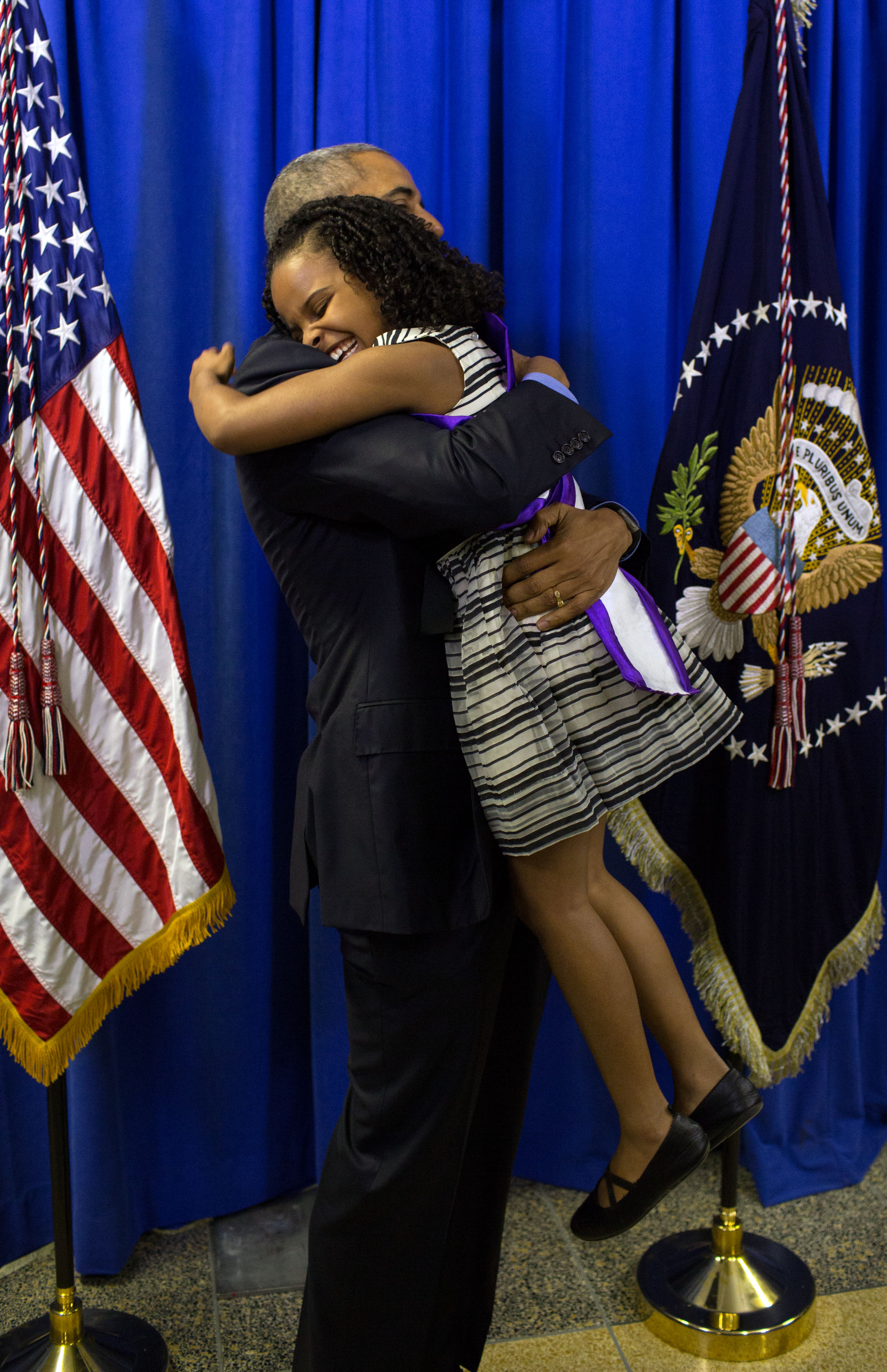
Amariyanna Copeny

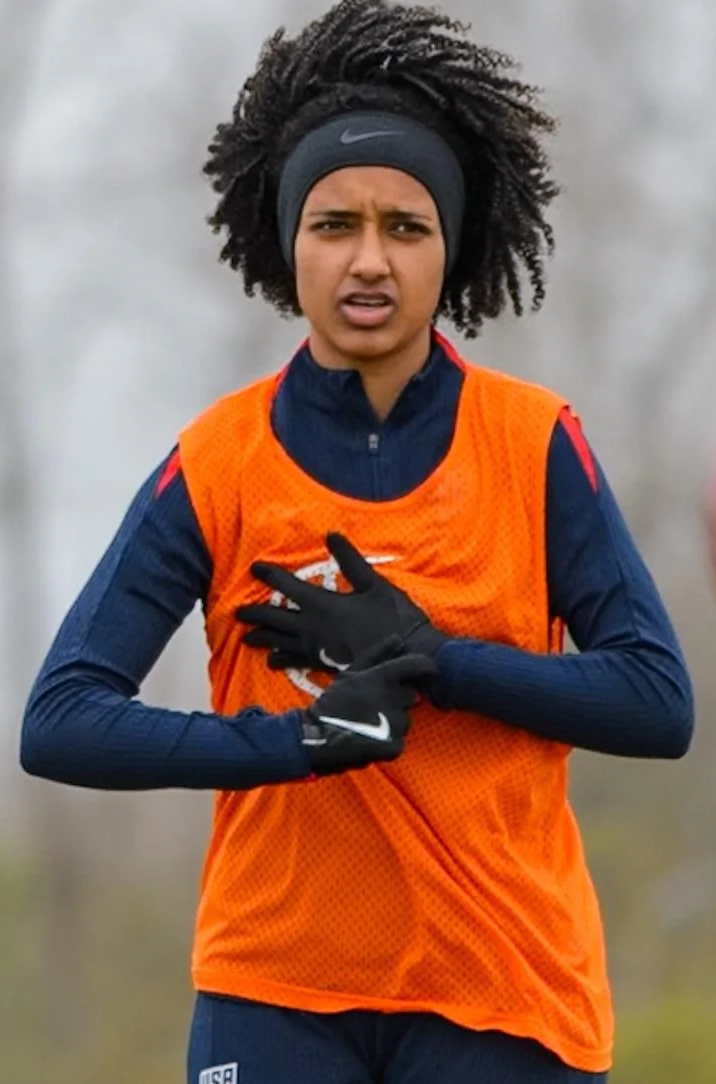
Lily Yohannes

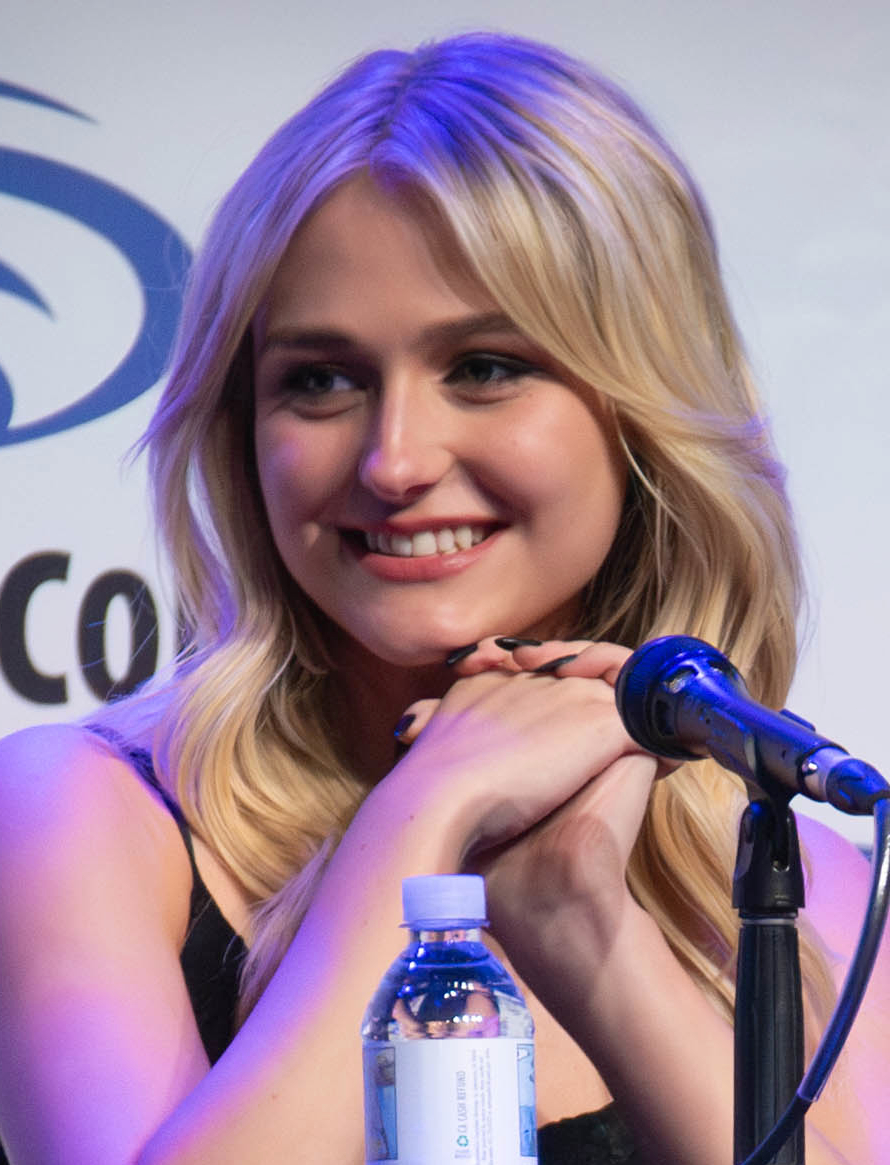
Alyvia Alyn Lind

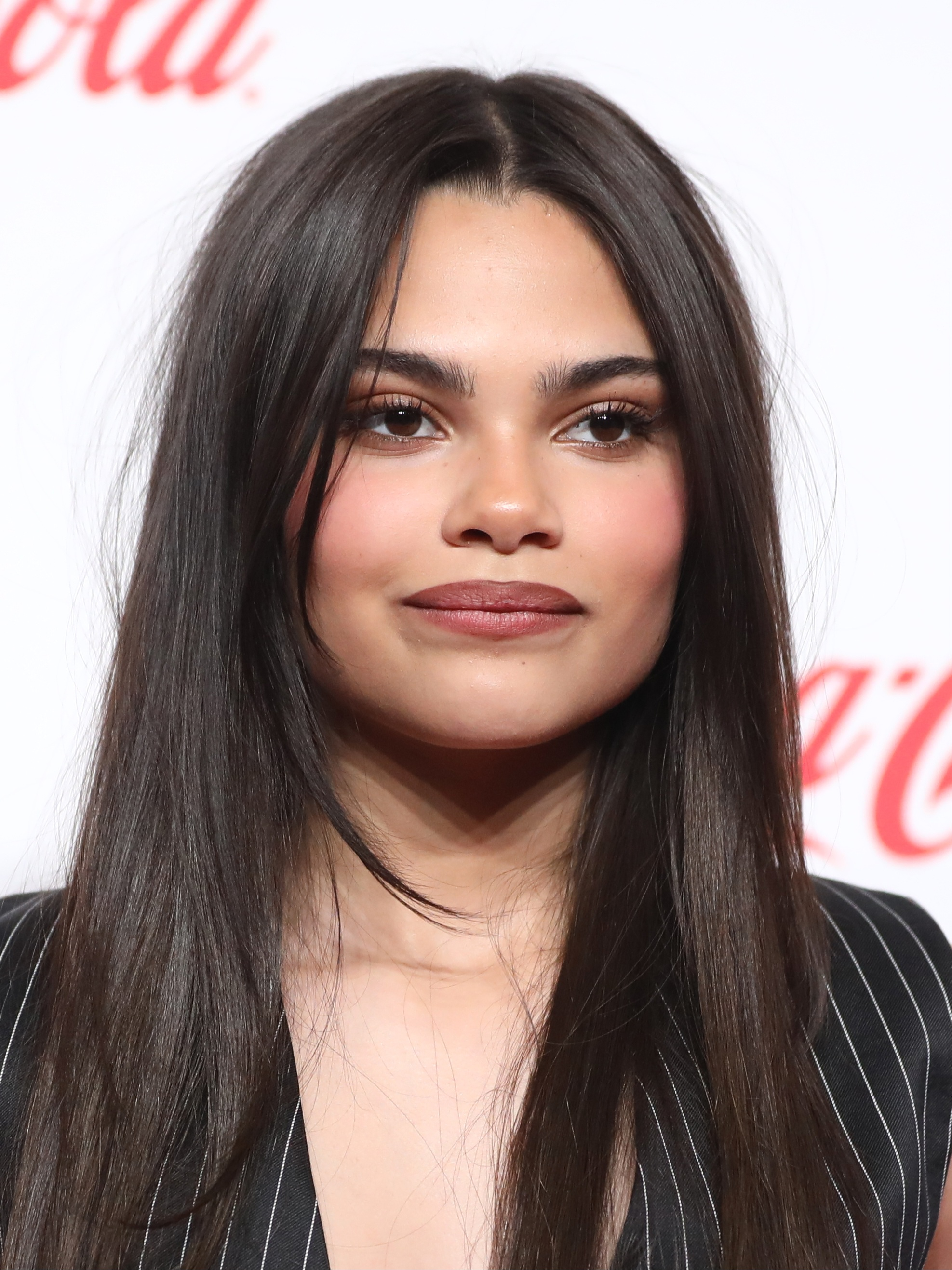
Ariana Greenblatt

- January 5 – Gavin Bottger, skateboarder
- January 18 – Tyler Crumley, actor
- January 25 – Olivia Edward, actress
- January 26 – Anna Leigh Waters, pickleball player
- February 7
  - Jason Liang, chess master
  - Thomas Heilman, swimmer
- February 9 – Zaila Avant-garde, first African-American winner of the Scripps National Spelling Bee
- February 27 – Demi Singleton, actress
- March 1 – Claire Weinstein, swimmer
- March 4 – Miya Cech, actress
- March 8 – Caden Glover, soccer player
- March 25 – Cailey Fleming, actress
- May 16 – Joshua Ang, Malaysian soccer player
- May 23 – Chloe Ricketts, soccer player
- April 10
  - YNW BSlime, rapper
  - Christina Dragan, Romanian-American rhythmic gymnast
- April 22 – Jake Bollman, racing driver
- June 6 – Aubrey Anderson-Emmons, actress
- June 9 – Ethan Nascimento, stock car racing driver
- June 12 – Lily Yohannes, soccer player
- June 14 – Bryce James, basketball player
- June 23
  - Desmond Napoles, drag performer
  - Elliana Walmsley, dancer
- June 24 – Stiven Jimenez, soccer player
- July 3 – Keedron Bryant, singer
- July 6 – Amariyanna Copeny, activist
- July 14 – Darby Camp, actress
- July 16 – Madray Johnson, artistic gymnast
- July 17 – Charlie Shotwell, actor
- July 18 – JD McCrary, singer, dancer, actor
- July 22 – Annie Sanders, rock climber
- July 27 – Alyvia Alyn Lind, actress
- July 29 – Lil Tay, rapper
- July 31 – Angelica Hale, singer
- August 16 – Seth Carr, actor
- August 27 – Ariana Greenblatt, actress
- August 28 – August Maturo, actor
- September 2 – Jack Messina, actor
- September 12 – Zackary Arthur, actor
- October 22 – Izaac Wang, actor
- November 3 – Ever Anderson, actress
- November 23 – Lonnie Chavis, actor
- December 4 – Scarlett Estevez, actress
- December 27 – Faithe Herman, actress

== Deaths ==
=== January ===
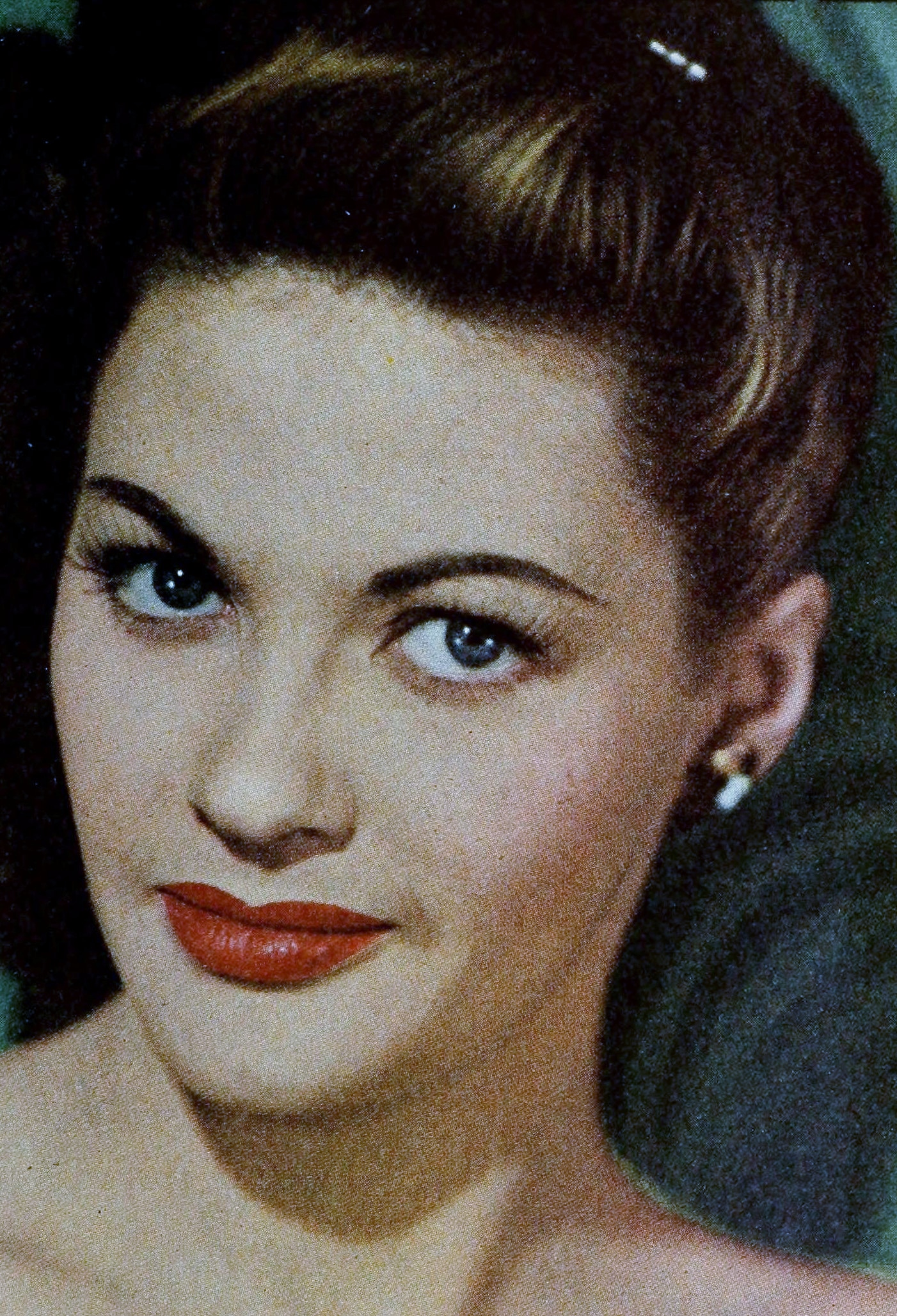
Yvonne De Carlo

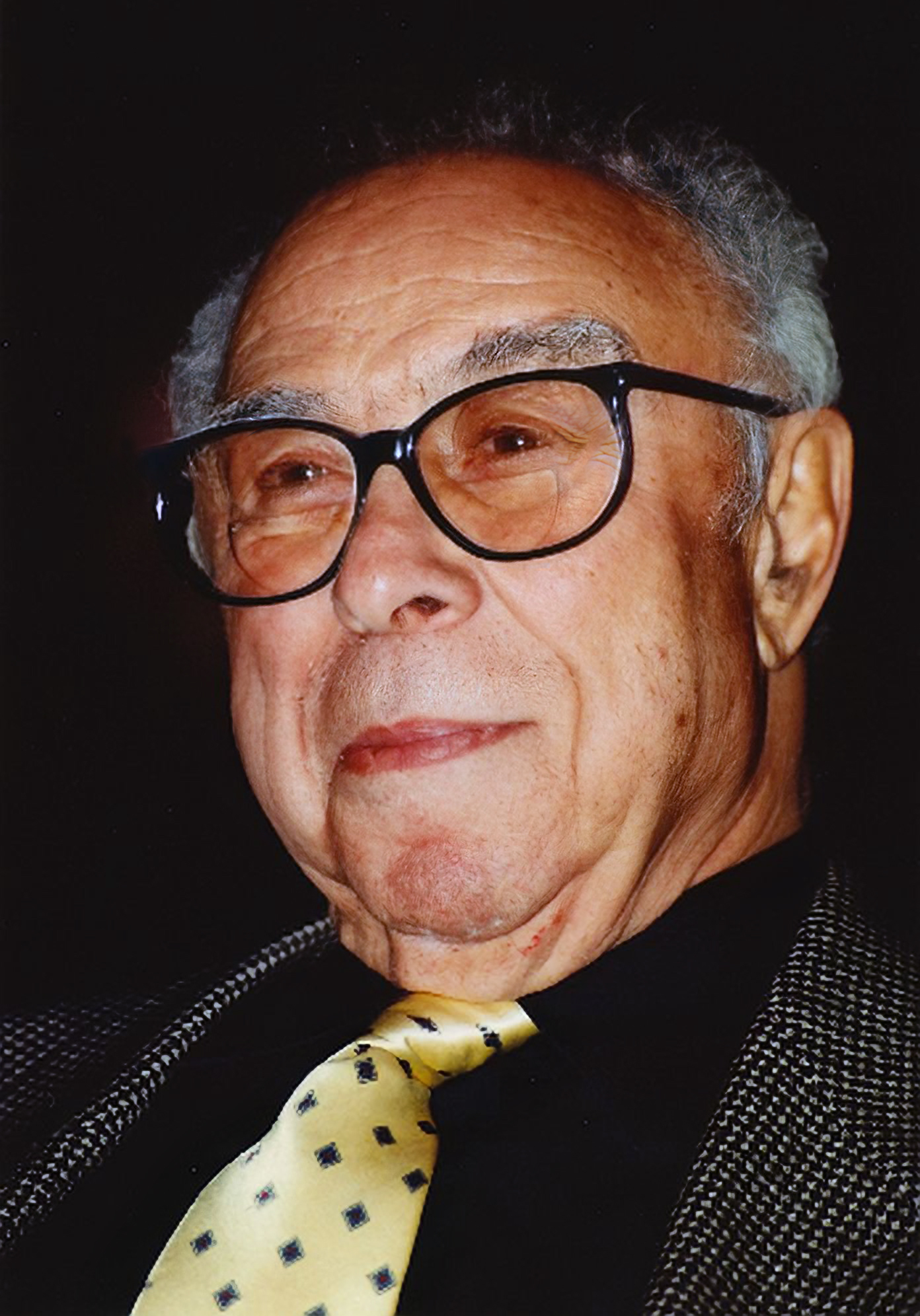
Art Buchwald

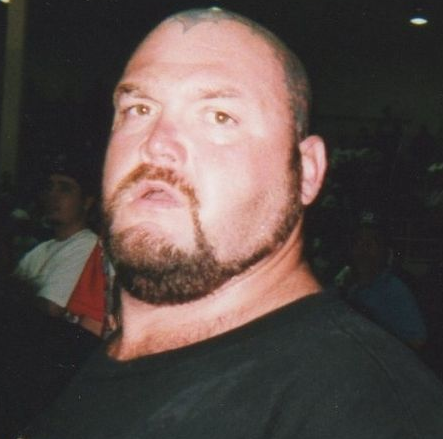
Bam Bam Bigelow

- January 1
  - Ernie Koy, baseball player (b. 1909)
  - Darrent Williams, American football player and murder victim (b. 1982)
  - Julius Hegyi, conductor (b. 1923)
  - Tad Jones, music historian (b. 1952)
  - Del Reeves, country singer (b. 1932)
- January 2 – Robert C. Solomon, philosopher, author, and academic (b. 1942)
- January 3 – Bob Milliken, baseball player (b. 1926)
- January 4 – Steve Krantz, film producer (b. 1923)
- January 6
  - Mario Danelo, college football player (b. 1985)
  - Ira D. Wallach, businessman and philanthropist (b. 1909)
- January 7 – Bobby Hamilton, race car driver (b. 1957)
- January 8
  - Yvonne de Carlo, Canadian-born American actress (b. 1922)
  - Iwao Takamoto, animator, television producer, and film director (b. 1925)
- January 11 – Robert Anton Wilson, writer, philosopher, psychologist, editor, and poet (b. 1932)
- January 12 – Alice Coltrane, musician and composer (b. 1937)
- January 13 – Michael Brecker, musician and composer (b. 1949)
- January 14 – Darlene Conley, actress (b. 1934)
- January 16
  - Ron Carey, actor (b. 1935)
  - Benny Parsons, race car driver and television announcer and analyst (b. 1941)
- January 17 – Art Buchwald, humorist (b. 1925)
- January 19
  - Bam Bam Bigelow, wrestler (b. 1961)
  - Dennis Doherty, member of The Mamas and The Papas (b. 1940)
- January 20
  - Dan Christensen, painter (b. 1942)
  - George Smathers, lawyer and politician (b. 1913)
- January 22 – Liz Renay, actress (b. 1926)
- January 23
  - E. Howard Hunt, intelligence officer (b. 1918)
  - Disco D, producer and DJ (b. 1980)
- January 25 – Charlotte Reid, singer and politician (b. 1913)
- January 27
  - Tige Andrews, actor (b. 1920)
  - Marcheline Bertrand, actress and humanitarian (b. 1950)
- January 28 – Emma Tillman, supercentenarian (b. 1892)
- January 30 – Sidney Sheldon, writer and screenwriter (b. 1917)
- January 31
  - Lee Bergere, actor (b. 1918)
  - Molly Ivins, columnist, political commentator, humorist, and writer (b. 1944)

=== February ===
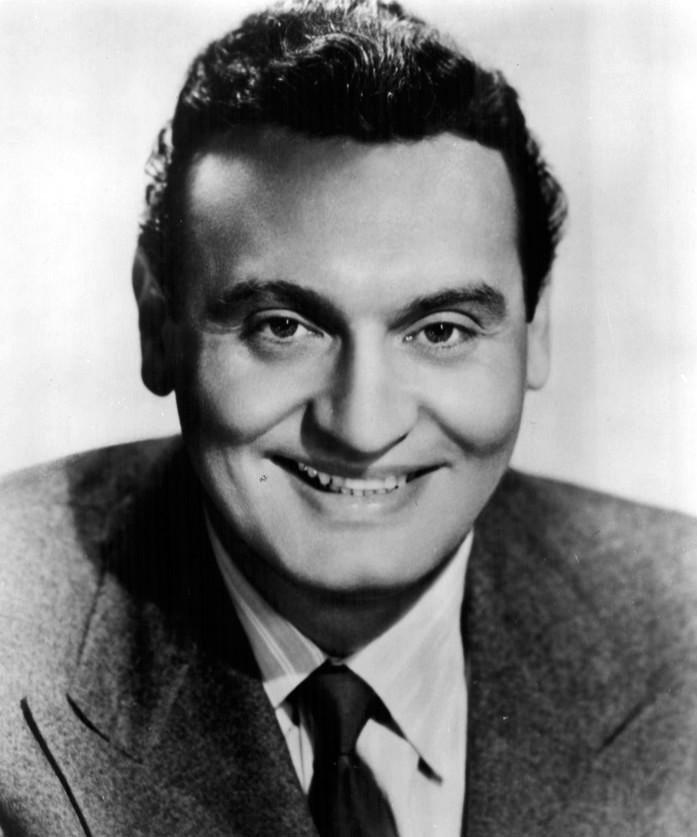
Frankie Laine

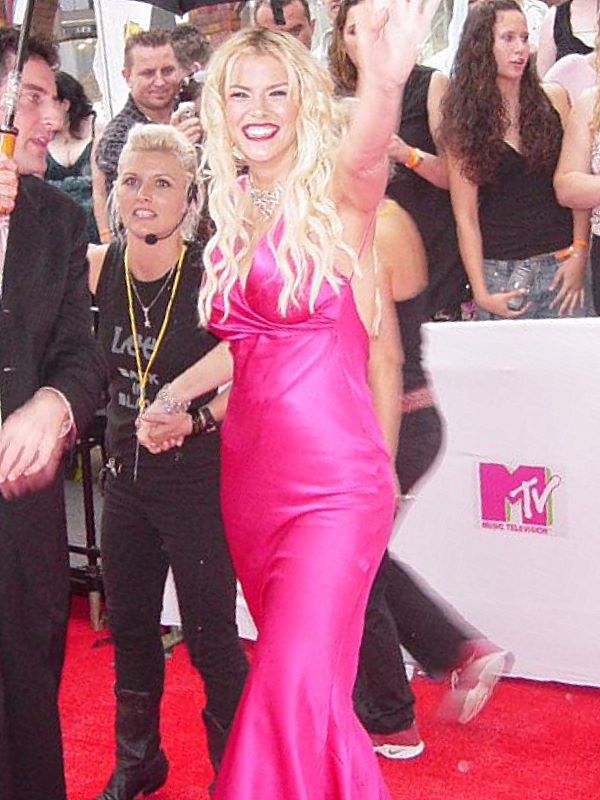
Anna Nicole Smith

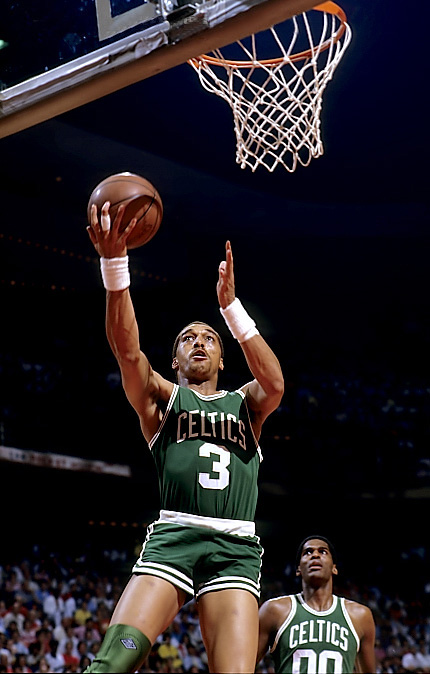
Dennis Johnson

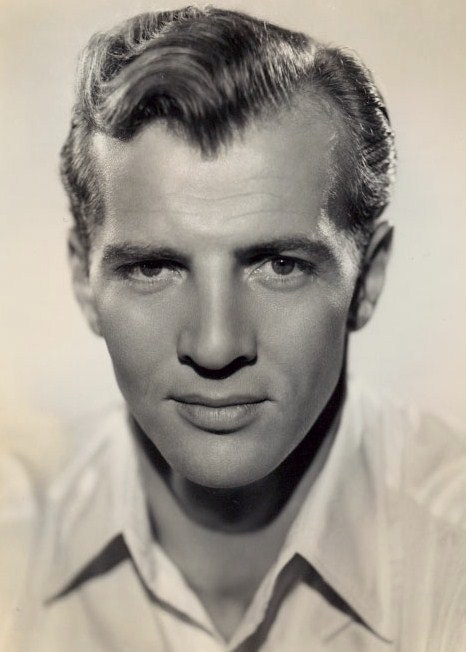
Bruce Bennett

- February 1
  - Ray Berres, baseball player (b. 1907)
  - Emery Bopp, artist and art teacher (b. 1924)
- February 2 – Eric Von Schmidt, folk musician (b. 1931)
- February 4
  - Steve Barber, baseball player (b. 1937)
  - Barbara McNair, actress (b. 1934)
- February 5 – Fred Ball, movie studio executive, actor, and brother of comedian Lucille Ball (d. 2007) (b. 1915)
- February 6
  - Frankie Laine, singer, songwriter, and actor (b. 1913)
  - Willye White, Olympic track and field athlete (b. 1939)
- February 7
  - Tommy James, football player (b. 1923)
  - Ken Kennedy, computer scientist (b. 1945)
  - Josephine Lenard, baseball player (b. 1921)
- February 8
  - Joe Edwards, comic book artist (b. 1921)
  - Anna Nicole Smith, model, actress, television personality and notable United States Supreme Court litigant (b. 1967)
  - Harriett Woods, politician (b. 1927)
- February 9 – Hank Bauer, baseball player and manager (b. 1922)
- February 10 – Cardis Cardell Willis, comic (b. 1937)
- February 11 – Charles Langford, politician (b. 1922)
- February 12 – Peggy Gilbert, bandleader (b. 1905)
- February 13
  - Bruce M. Metzger, biblical scholar (b. 1914)
  - Charlie Norwood politician (b. 1941)
- February 15 – Walker Edmiston, actor (b. 1925)
- February 16 – Gene Snyder, politician (b. 1928)
- February 17 – Mike Awesome, wrestler (b. 1965)
- February 18
  - Barbara Gittings, LGBT activist (b. 1932)
  - Bob Oksner, comic book artist (b. 1916)
- February 19 – Janet Blair, big-band singer (b. 1921)
- February 22
  - Avrohom Blumenkrantz, Orthodox rabbi (b. 1944)
  - Dennis Johnson, basketball player (b. 1954)
- February 23 – Donnie Brooks, pop singer (b. 1935)
- February 24
  - Bruce Bennett, actor and athlete (b. 1906)
  - Leroy Jenkins, composer (b. 1932)
  - Lamar Lundy, American football player (b. 1935)
- February 25 – William Anderson, American naval officer and politician (b. 1921)
- February 27 – Elbie Nickel, American football player (b. 1922)
- February 28
  - Robert Kingston, army general (b. 1928)
  - Arthur M. Schlesinger Jr., historian and political commentator (b. 1917)

=== March ===
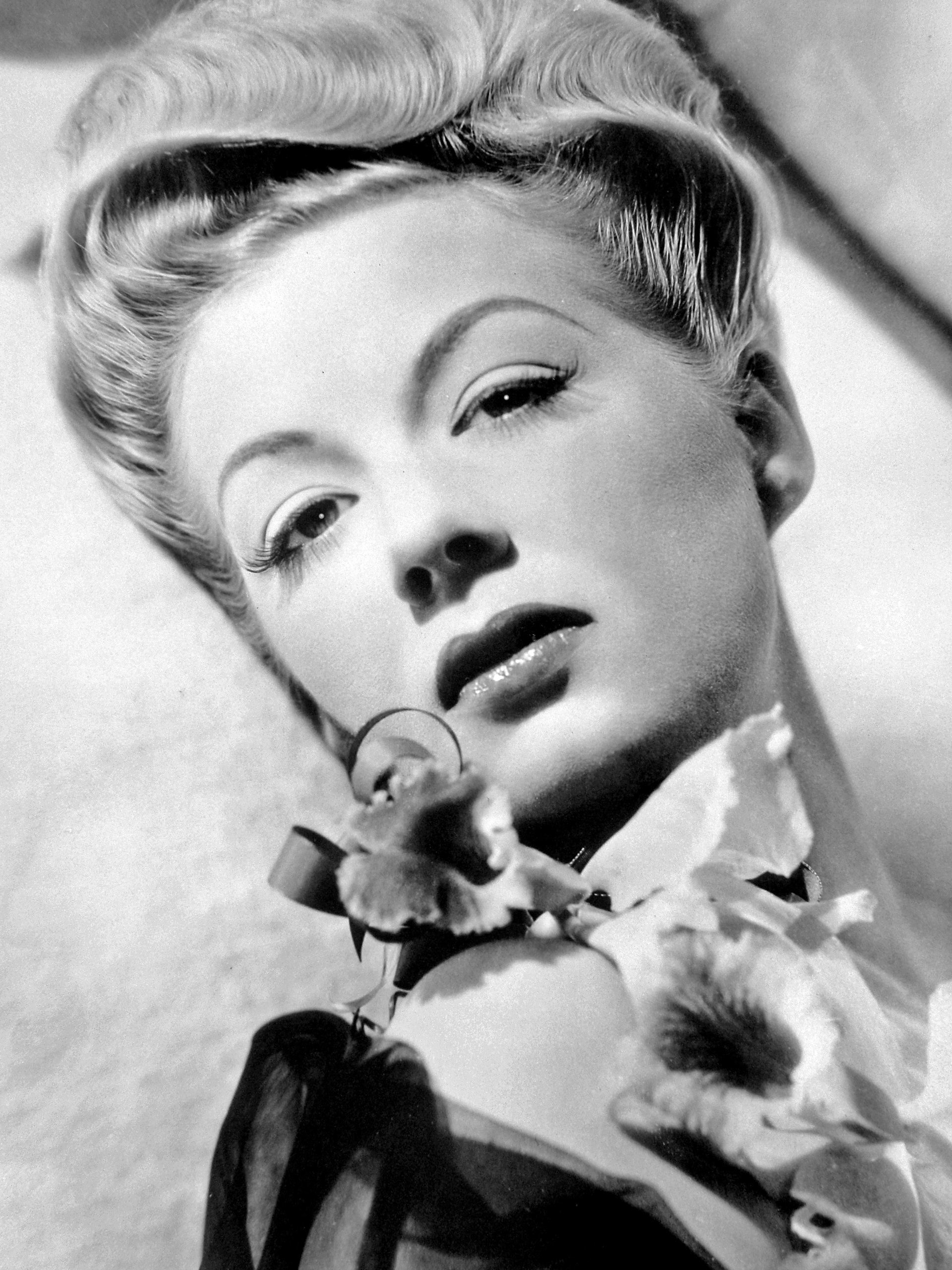
Betty Hutton

- March 4
  - Thomas Eagleton, politician (b. 1929)
  - Bob Hattoy, activist (b. 1950)
- March 6 – Allen Coage, professional wrestler (b. 1943)
- March 8 – Christopher Barrios Jr., murder victim (b. 2001)
- March 9 – Brad Delp, singer (Boston) (b. 1951)
- March 10
  - Ernie Ladd, American football player and professional wrestler (b. 1938)
  - Richard Jeni, stand-up comedian (b. 1957)
- March 12 – Betty Hutton, actress (b. 1921)
- March 15 – Bowie Kuhn, baseball commissioner and lawyer (b. 1926)
- March 19
  - Calvert DeForest, actor and comedian (b. 1921)
  - Luther Ingram, singer-songwriter (b. 1937)
- March 20 – Gilbert E. Patterson, American bishop (b. 1939)
- March 23 – Eric Medlen, American race car driver (b. 1973)
- March 28
  - Abe Coleman, Polish-born American wrestler (b. 1905)
  - Bill Fisk, American football player and coach (b. 1916)
  - Tony Scott, American musician (b. 1921)

=== April ===
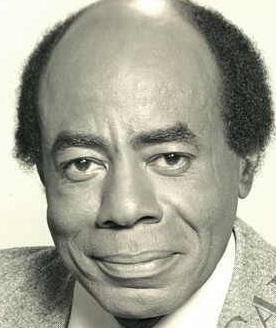
Roscoe Lee Browne

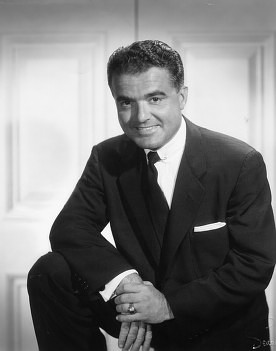
Jack Valenti

- April 3 – Eddie Robinson, American football coach (b. 1919)
- April 4 – Bob Clark, film director (b. 1939)
- April 5
  - Mark St. John, guitarist (b. 1956)
  - Thomas Stoltz Harvey pathologist who conducted Albert Einstein's autopsy (b. 1912)
  - Darryl Stingley, American football player (b. 1951)
- April 7
  - Johnny Hart, cartoonist (b. 1931)
  - Win Hickey, socialite, politician, First Lady of Wyoming and one of the first woman to serve in the Wyoming Senate (b. 1912)
  - Barry Nelson, actor (b. 1917)
- April 11
  - Roscoe Lee Browne, actor (b. 1922)
  - Ronald Speirs, United States Army officer (b. 1920)
  - Kurt Vonnegut, novelist and playwright (b. 1922)
- April 14 – Don Ho, musician (b. 1930)
- April 16 – Seung-Hui Cho, mass murderer (b. 1984)
- April 17 – Kitty Carlisle, singer, actress & talk show panelist (b. 1910)
- April 22 – Juanita Millender-McDonald, politician (b. 1938)
- April 23 – David Halberstam, journalist and historian (b. 1934)
- April 25 – Bobby Pickett, singer-songwriter and comedian (b. 1938)
- April 26 – Jack Valenti, American film executive, creator of MPAA film rating system (b. 1921)
- April 28
  - Dabbs Greer, American actor (b. 1917)
  - Tommy Newsom, American musician (b. 1929)
- April 30
  - Tom Poston, actor (b. 1921)
  - Gordon Scott, actor (b. 1926)

=== May ===
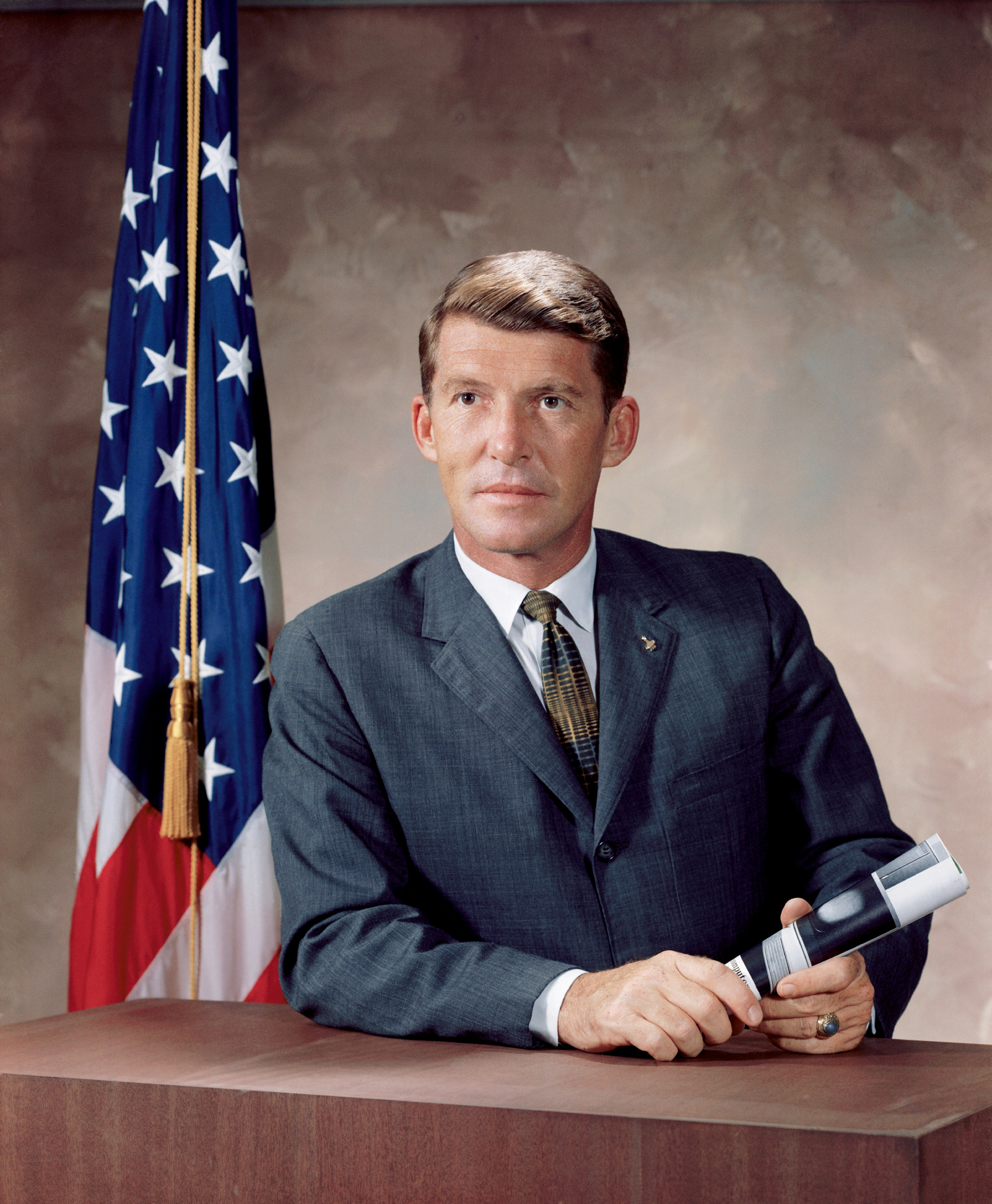
Wally Schirra

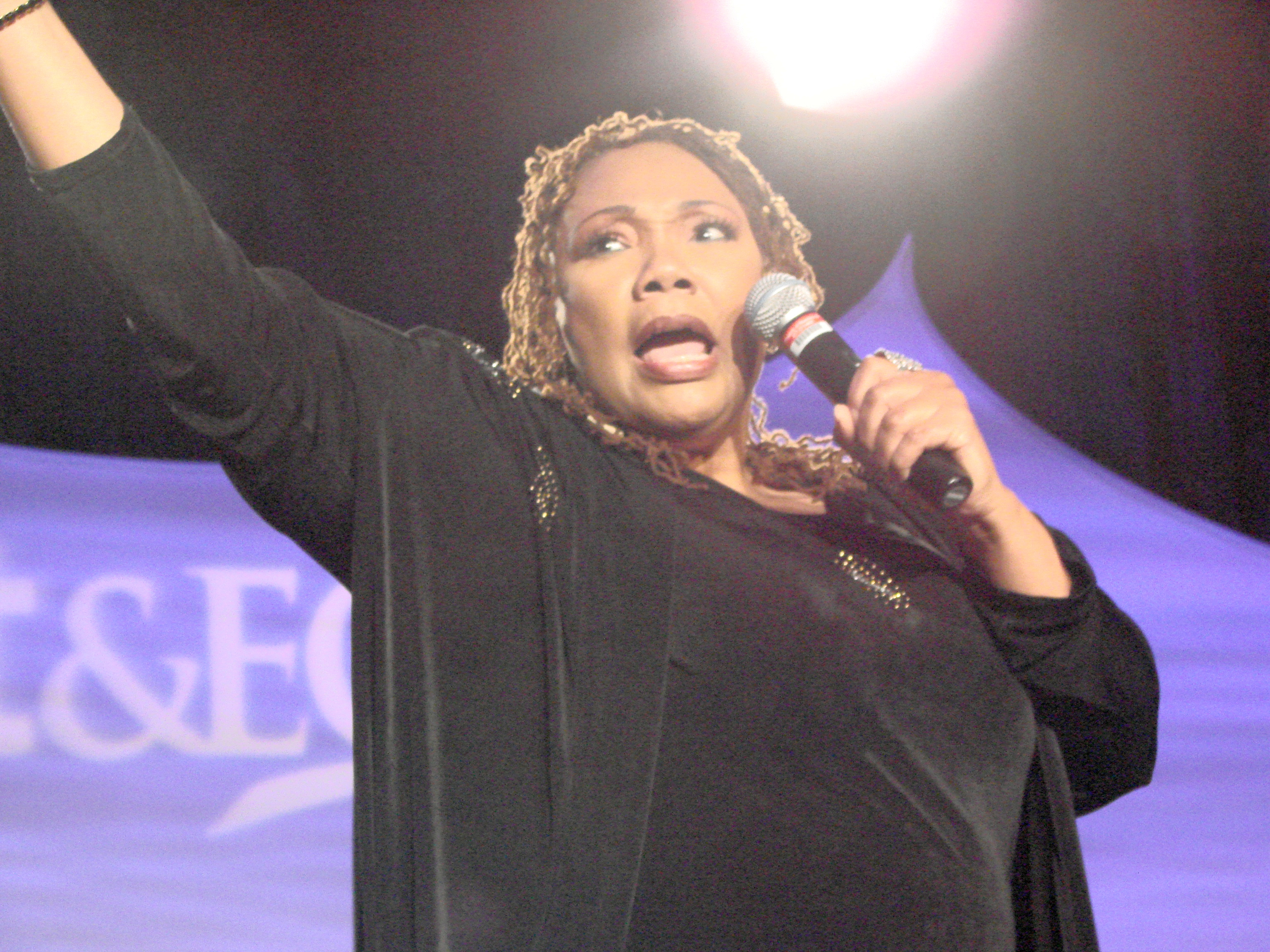
Yolanda King

- May 3 – Wally Schirra, astronaut (b. 1923)
- May 5 – Theodore Maiman, physicist (b. 1927)
- May 9 – Edith Rodriguez, medical patient (b. 1964)
- May 12 – Teddy Infuhr, actor (b. 1936)
- May 15
  - Jerry Falwell, evangelist (b. 1933)
  - Yolanda King, actress and activist, daughter of Martin Luther King Jr. (b. 1955)
- May 17 – Lloyd Alexander, author (b. 1924)
- May 20 – Stanley Miller, chemist and biologist (b. 1930)
- May 25 – Charles Nelson Reilly, actor, comedian, and director (b. 1931)
- May 28
  - Marquise Hill, American football player (b. 1982)
  - David Lane, white nationalist (b. 1938)

=== June ===
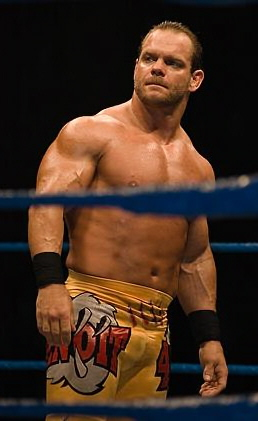
Chris Benoit

- June 1
  - Arn Shein, journalist (b. 1928)
  - Tony Thompson, singer (b. 1975)
- June 4 – Craig L. Thomas, American politician (b. 1933)
- June 8 – Nellie Lutcher, African American jazz singer (b. 1912)
- June 11 – Mala Powers, American film actress (b. 1931)
- June 12 – Don Herbert, American television personality, Mr. Wizard (b. 1917)
- June 14 – Ruth Bell Graham, wife of Billy Graham (b. 1920)
- June 15 – Sherri Martel, American professional wrestler (b. 1958)
- June 22 – Nancy Benoit, wrestling valet and manager, and wife and murder victim of Chris Benoit (b. 1964)
- June 23 – Rod Beck, baseball player (b. 1968)
- June 24 – Chris Benoit, Canadian WWE wrestler, and husband and murderer of Nancy Benoit (b. 1967)
- June 26 – Liz Claiborne, American fashion designer (b. 1929)
- June 29 – Joel Siegel, American film critic (b. 1943)

=== July ===
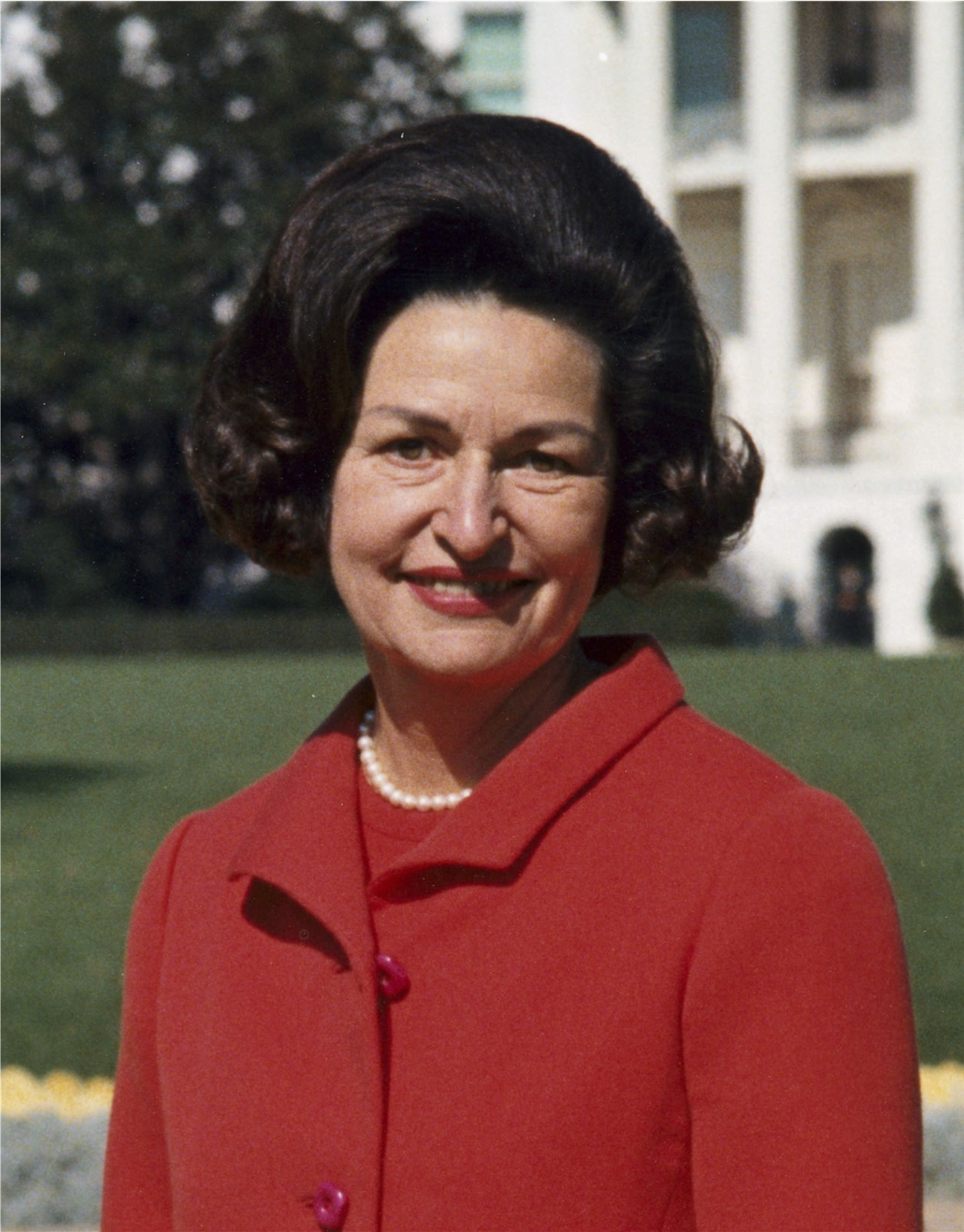
Lady Bird Johnson

- July 2
  - Beverly Sills, operatic soprano (b. 1929)
  - Hy Zaret, lyricist and composer (b. 1907)
- July 3 – Boots Randolph, saxophone player (b. 1927)
- July 4
  - Johnny Frigo, jazz violinist and bassist (b. 1916)
  - Bill Pinkney, singer (b. 1925)
- July 5 – Kerwin Mathews, actor (b. 1926)
- July 9 – Charles Lane, actor (b. 1905)
- July 11
  - Shag Crawford, umpire in Major League baseball (b. 1916)
  - Lady Bird Johnson, wife of Lyndon B. Johnson, First Lady of the United States, Second Lady of the United States (b. 1912)
- July 20 – Tammy Faye Messner, televangelist (b. 1942)
- July 22 – László Kovács, Hungarian-born American cinematographer (b. 1933)
- July 23 – Benjamin Libet, pioneering scientist in the field of human consciousness (b. 1916)
- July 24
  - Albert Ellis, psychologist (b. 1913)
  - Riley Ann Sawyers, murder victim (b. 2005)
- July 27 – William J. Tuttle, makeup artist (b. 1912)
- July 29 – Tom Snyder, talk show host (b. 1936)
- July 30 – Bill Walsh, American football coach (b. 1931)

=== August ===
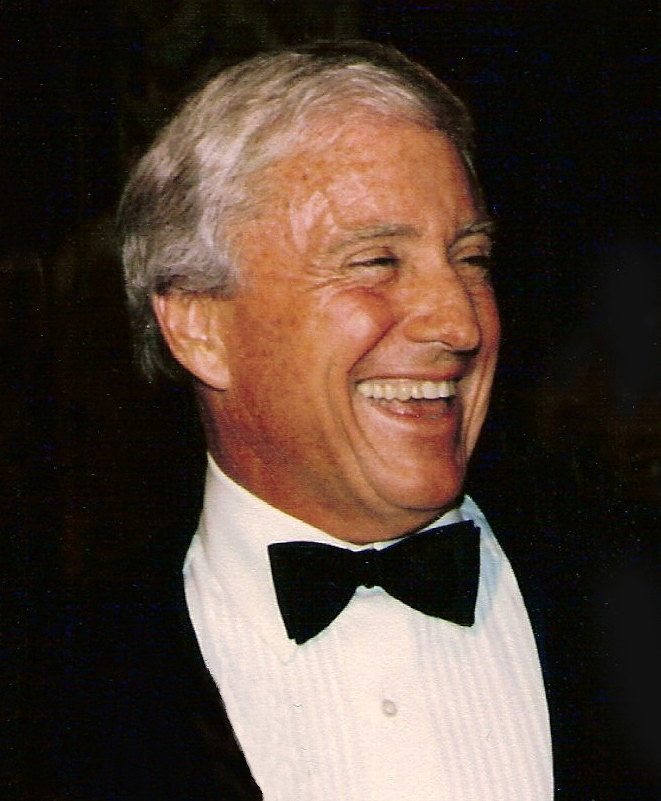
Merv Griffin

- August 3 – James Callahan, actor (b. 1930)
- August 4 – Lee Hazlewood, singer-songwriter and record producer (b. 1929)
- August 5 – Oliver Hill, lawyer (b. 1907)
- August 12 – Merv Griffin, singer, television producer and land developer (b. 1925)
- August 13
  - Brooke Astor, socialite and philanthropist (b. 1902)
  - Brian Adams, professorial wrestler (b. 1964)
  - Phil Rizzuto, baseball player and announcer (b. 1917)
- August 15 – John Gofman, American Manhattan Project scientist and advocate (b. 1918)
- August 16 – Max Roach, American percussionist, drummer, and composer (b. 1924)
- August 17 – Eddie Griffin, American basketball player (b. 1982)
- August 18 – Michael Deaver, American political adviser (b. 1938)
- August 20 – Leona Helmsley, American hotel operator and real estate investor (b. 1920)
- August 28 – Miyoshi Umeki, Japanese-American singer and actress (b. 1929)
- August 29 – Richard Jewell, American falsely accused of bombing the Centennial Olympic Park (b. 1962)

=== September ===
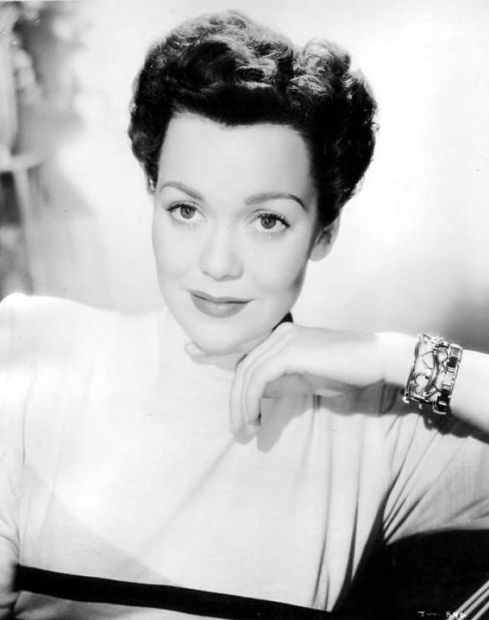
Jane Wyman

- September 2 – Marcia Mae Jones, actress (b. 1924)
- September 3 – Steve Fossett, businessman, aviator, and sailer, missing person declared-dead in absentia (b. 1944)
- September 6 – Percy Rodriguez, Canadian actor (b. 1918)
- September 7 – Sidney Leviss, American politician and judge (b. 1917)
- September 10 – Jane Wyman, American actress, first wife of Ronald Reagan (b. 1917)
- September 15 – Brett Somers, American actress (b. 1924)
- September 20 – Mahlon Clark, American musician (b. 1923)
- September 21
  - Neveah Gallegos, murder victim (b. 2004)
  - Alice Ghostley, American actress (b. 1926)
  - Rex Humbard, evangelist (b. 1919)

=== October ===
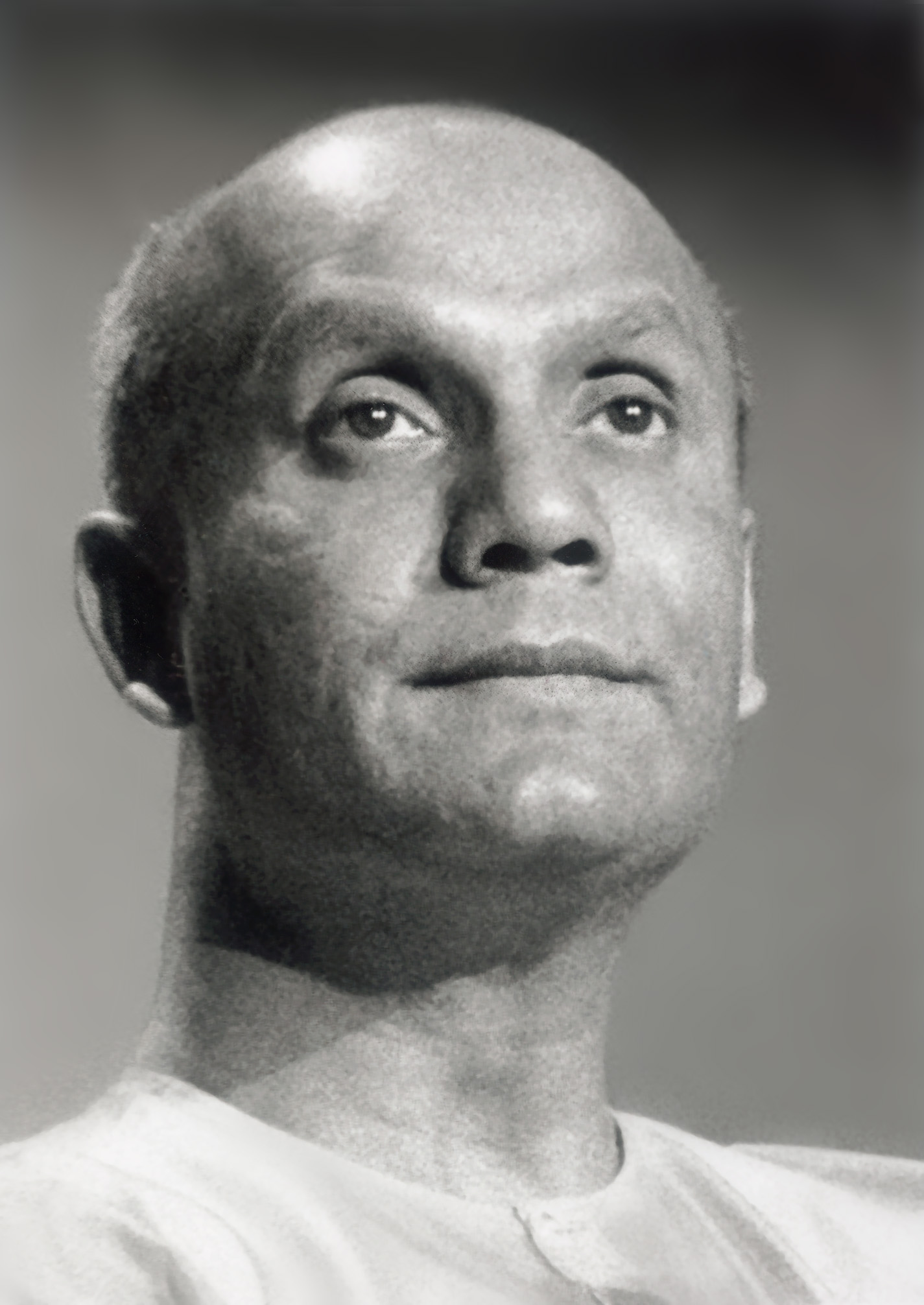
Sri Chinmoy

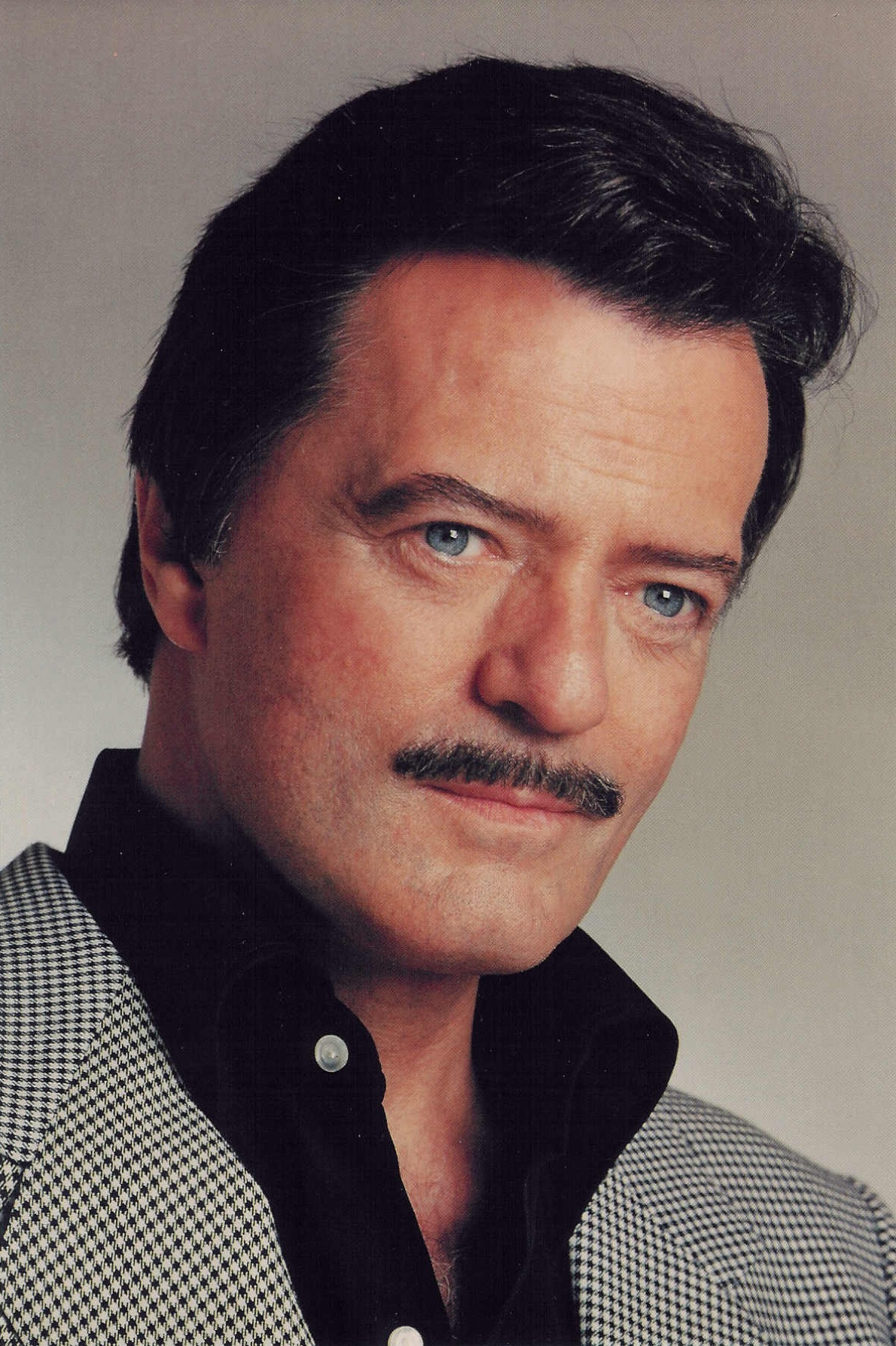
Robert Goulet

- October 1 – Al Oerter, athlete (b. 1936)
- October 2 – George Grizzard, actor (b. 1928)
- October 6 – Jo Ann Davis, politician (b. 1950)
- October 11 – Sri Chinmoy, Indian philosopher (b. 1931)
- October 12 – Lonny Chapman, actor (b. 1920)
- October 14
  - Big Moe, rapper (b. 1974)
  - Sigrid Valis, actress (b. 1935)
- October 17
  - Joey Bishop, entertainer (b. 1918)
  - Teresa Brewer, singer (b. 1931)
  - Suzy Covey, scholar (b. 1939)
- October 18
  - William J. Crowe, military commander and ambassador (b. 1925)
  - Vincent DeDomenico, entrepreneur (b. 1915)
- October 26
  - Friedman Paul Erhardt, German-born American television chef (b. 1943)
  - Arthur Kornberg, biochemist (b. 1918)
- October 28 – Porter Wagoner, country singer (b. 1927)
- October 29 – Dan Lakly, politician, member of the Georgia House of Representatives (b. 1942)
- October 30
  - Karen Fraction, actress (b. 1958)
  - Robert Goulet, entertainer (b. 1933)
  - John Woodruff, athlete (b. 1915)

=== November ===
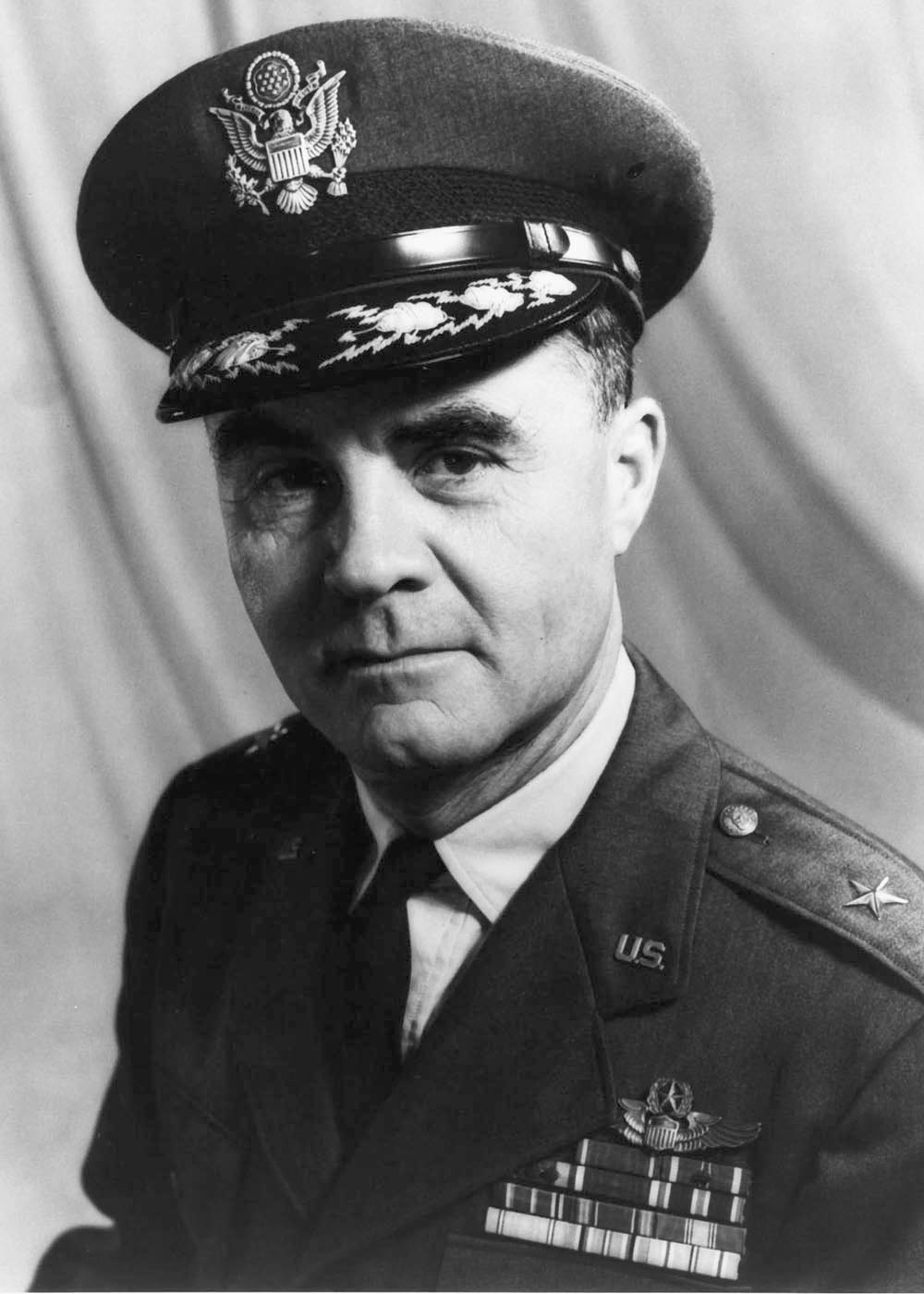
Paul Tibbets

Norman Mailer

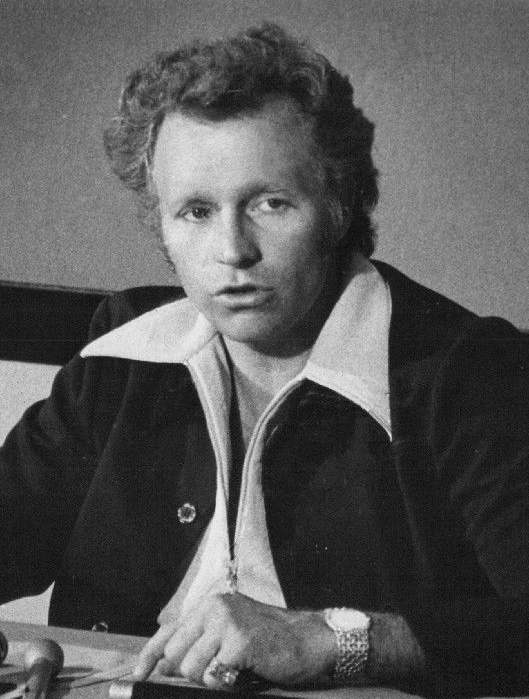
Evel Knievel

- November 1 – Paul Tibbets, pilot of the Enola Gay (b. 1915)
- November 2 – The Fabulous Moolah, professional wrestler (b. 1923)
- November 3 – Ryan Shay, runner (b. 1979)
- November 6 – Hank Thompson, country singer (b. 1925)
- November 10
  - Laraine Day, actress (b. 1920)
  - Augustus F. Hawkins, politician and civil rights lawmaker (b. 1907)
  - Norman Mailer, writer (b. 1923)
  - Donda West, educator, activist and mother of Kanye West (b. 1949)
- November 11 – Delbert Mann, film and television director (b. 1920)
- November 12 – Ira Levin, novelist (b. 1929)
- November 15 – Joe Nuxhall, baseball player and announcer (b. 1928)
- November 16 – Harold Alfond, businessman (b. 1914)
- November 18
  - Sidney Coleman, theoretical physicist (b. 1937)
  - Dick Wilson, actor (b. 1916)
- November 19 – Kevin DuBrow, musician (Quiet Riot) (b. 1955)
- November 24
  - Casey Calvert, musician (Hawthorne Heights) (b. 1981)
  - Joseph Minish, politician (b. 1916)
- November 25 – Kevin DuBrow, musician (Quiet Riot) (b. 1955)
- November 27
  - Sean Taylor, American football player (b. 1983)
  - Robert Cade, American physician and inventor of the beverage Gatorade (b. 1927)
  - Bill Willis, American football player (b. 1921)
- November 28 – Jeanne Bates, actress (b. 1918)
- November 29
  - Henry Hyde, politician (b. 1924)
  - Roger Bonham Smith, businessman (b. 1925)
- November 30 – Evel Knievel, motorcycle stunt performer (b. 1938)

=== December ===
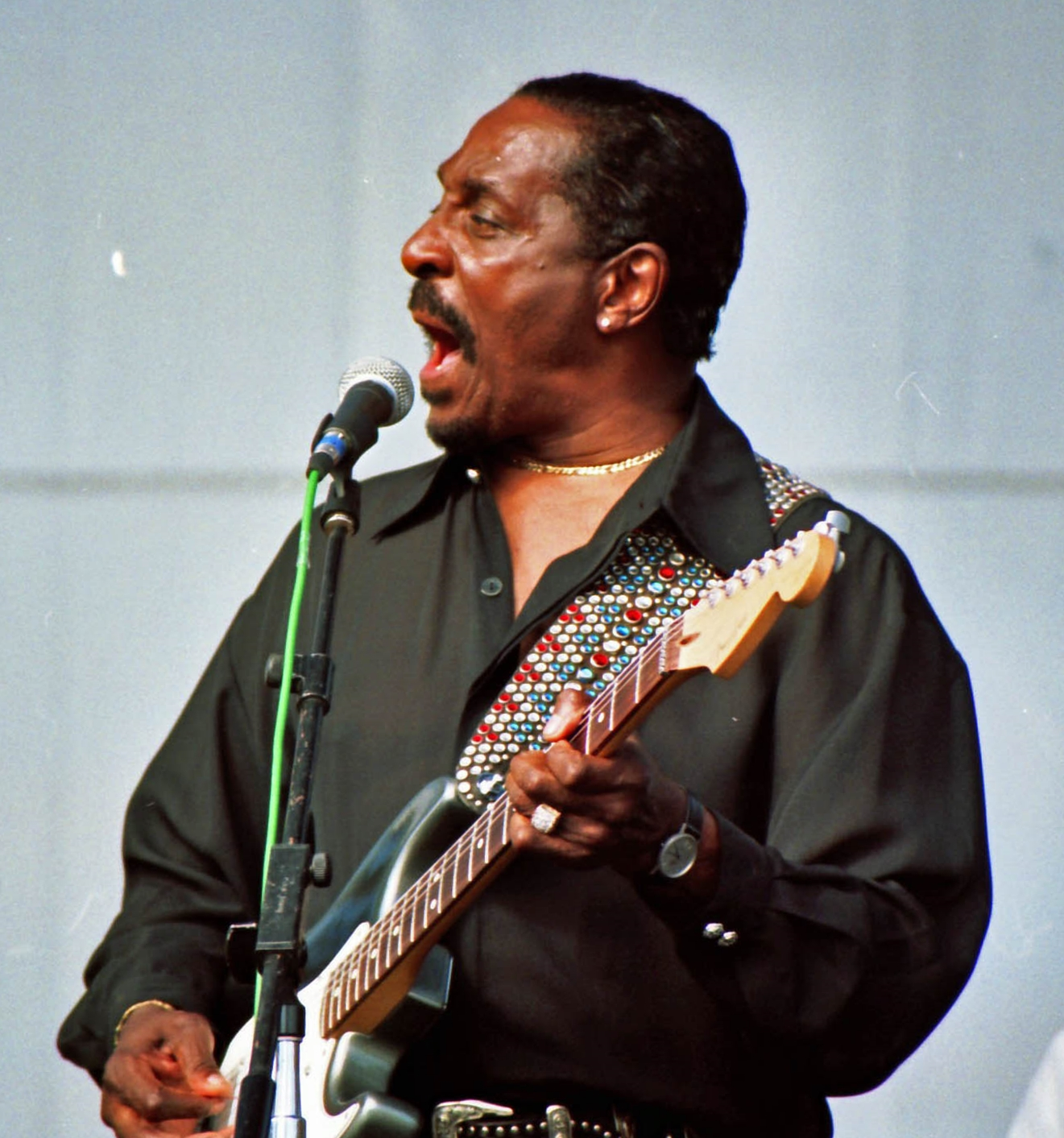
Ike Turner

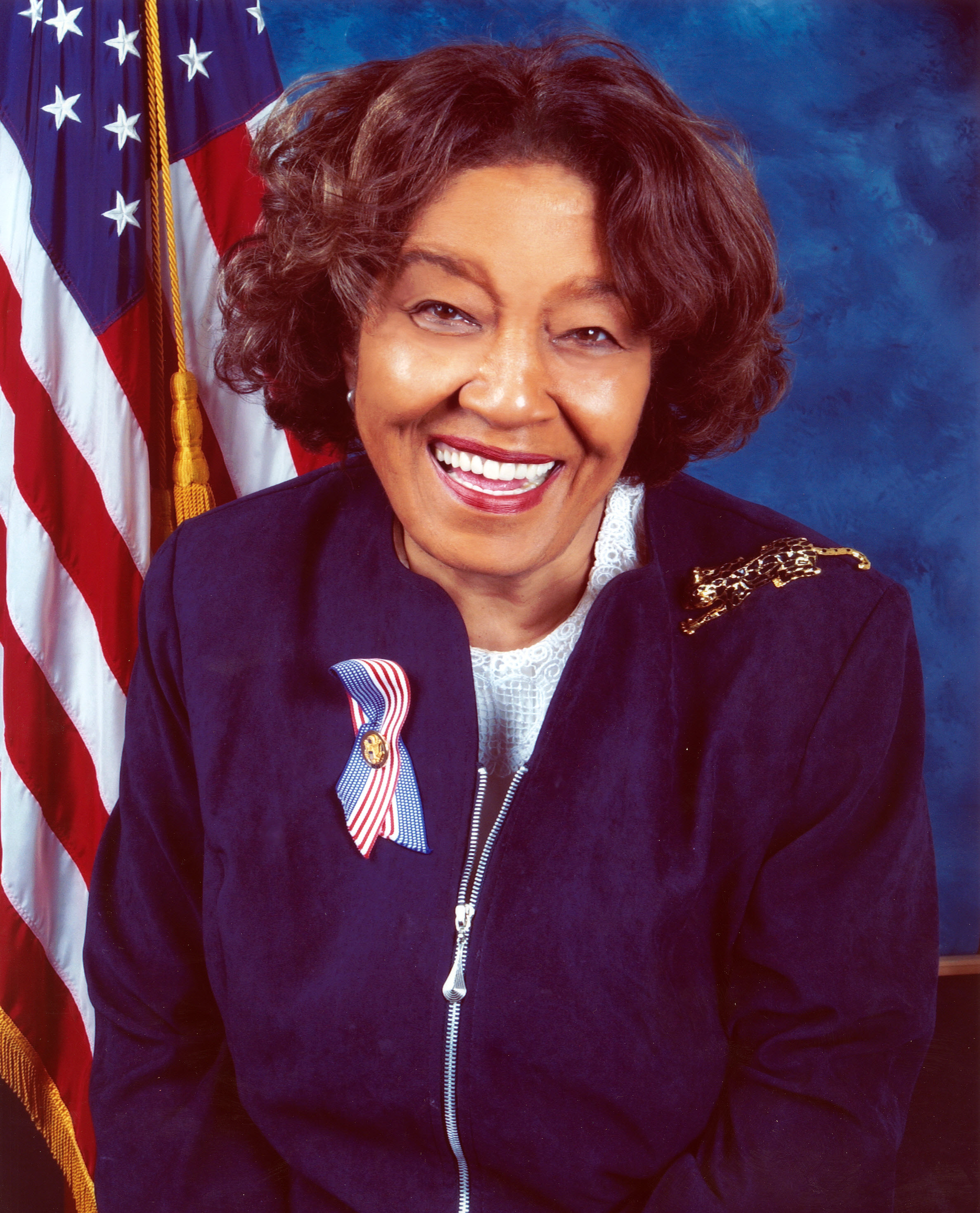
Julia Carson

- December 2
  - Robert O. Anderson, businessman (b. 1917)
  - Elizabeth Hardwick, literary critic and novelist (b. 1916)
- December 4
  - Pimp C, rapper (b. 1973)
  - Chip Reese, professional gambler (b. 1951)
- December 10 – Frank Braynard, maritime writer and historian. (b. 1916)
- December 12
  - Shawn Eckardt, bodyguard and businessman (b. 1967)
  - Ike Turner, musician (b. 1931)
- December 13 – Floyd Westerman, actor and activist (b. 1936)
- December 15 – Julia Carson, politician (b. 1938)
- December 16 – Dan Fogelberg, singer and songwriter (b. 1951)
- December 18 – Bill Strauss, satirist, author and historian (b. 1947)
- December 21
  - Carol Bly, teacher and author (b. 1930)
  - Ken Hendricks, businessman, founded ABC Supply (b. 1941)
- December 23 – Michael Kidd, choreographer (b. 1915)
- December 31 – Michael Goldberg, American abstract expressionist painter (b. 1924)

== See also ==
- 2007 in American soccer
- 2007 in American television
- List of American films of 2007
- Timeline of United States history (1990–2009)
