= Arn Shein =

American journalist

Arn Shein (September 1, 1928 – June 1, 2007) was an American sports writer and editor for The Daily Item (Port Chester) in New York from 1949 to 1974, where he wrote a regular column titled "Spotlight on Sports". After retirement, due to severe case of psoriatic arthritis, Arn became a freelance writer in 1983 and sold about 350 articles to over 60 major magazines, including Reader's Digest, Modern Maturity, and Guideposts.

== Early life ==
Shein was born in Brooklyn, New York.

== Career ==
He began his career as a sports writer in 1949 working for the Reporter Dispatch. In 1955, he started working for the Port Chester Daily Item where he was a sports editor. After retiring in 1974, he became president and co-owner of Demar. He later moved to San Diego, California and pursued his career in writing and teaching courses in creative writing.

While working for The Daily Item, Arn interviewed sports stars of the era, such as Mickey Mantle and Jackie Robinson. He was also the ghostwriter for a large portion of Rolf Benirschke's autobiography.

== Family ==
Shein was married to his wife Marylou for 56 years and together they had three daughters, eight grandchildren, and a great-great-grandson.

== Death ==
Shein died on June 1, 2007, at the age of 78.

== Sources ==
- http://www.ptm.org/98PT/SepOct/WeddingPromise.htm
- http://www.jewsforjesus.org/publications/issues/10_3/ida
- https://www.angelfire.com/theforce/cafs/cafsnewsltr400.html
- https://web.archive.org/web/20070927201215/http://legacy.com/SignOnSanDiego/Obituaries.asp?Page=Notice&PersonID=88955784
