= Oregon State University Mars Rover =

OSU Mars Rover
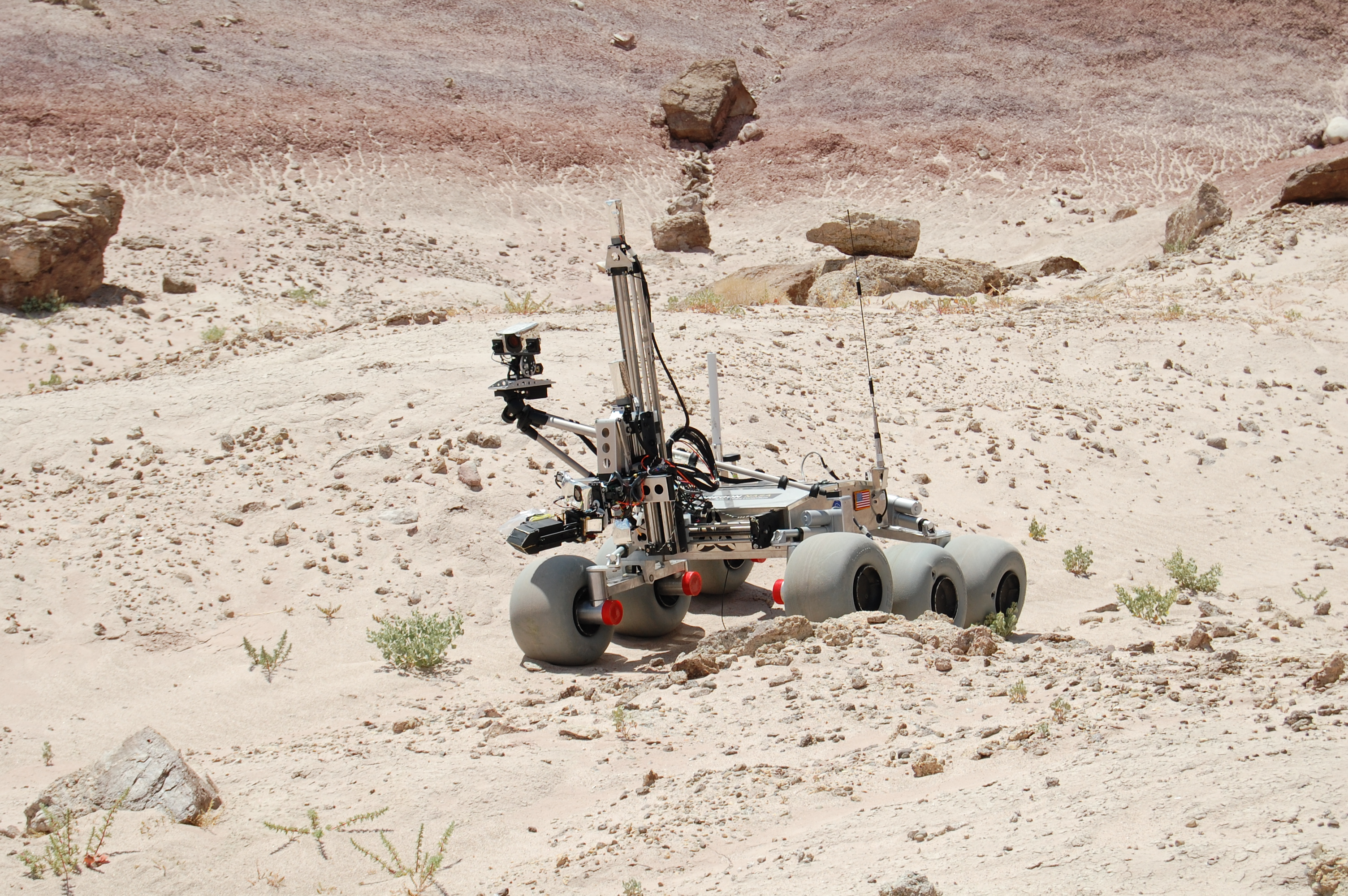
- Mars Rover 3.0, First Place, URC-2010
- Formation: September 24, 2007; 19 years ago
- Type: University Club
- Headquarters: Oregon State University
- Location: Corvallis, Oregon
- Members: Students
- Team Lead: Anthony Grana
- Parent organization: Oregon State University Robotics Club
- Website: osurobotics.club

The OSU Mars Rover is a student-organized project, which designs, builds, and tests a remotely operated terrestrial rover every year. The rover competes in the University Rover Challenge (URC), hosted by the Mars Society. The team is composed of students in Electrical Engineering, Mechanical Engineering, Software Engineering, and Science at Oregon State University.

== Awards ==
- First Place, 2008 University Rover Challenge - Mars Rover 1
- Fourth Place, 2009 University Rover Challenge - Mars Rover 2
- First Place, 2010 University Rover Challenge - Mars Rover 3.0
- Third Place, 2011 University Rover Challenge - Rover 3.1
- First Place, 2018 Canadian International Rover Challenge

== Competition ==
The University Rover Challenge, hosted by the Mars Society, is an international competition to design a mobile robotic platform that can perform several tasks. Each task is worth 100 points.

== History ==
=== 2008 ===
2008 was the first time the Mars Rover competed in the URC taking first place. The overall design consisted of a prefabricated chassis and a gasoline motor. The rover had a robotic arm that could drill and an onboard camera system. The Team Lead for the 2008 Mars Rover Team was Matt Shuman.

This Mars Rover is design concept 1.0.

=== 2009 ===
The 2009 Mars Rover took fourth place in the URC. The overall design consisted of an aluminum box chassis, with 4 thin rubber wheels. The Team Lead for the 2009 Mars Rover Team was Ryan Albright.

This Mars Rover is design concept 2.0.

=== 2010 ===
The 2010 Rover took first place in the URC, winning with 315 points out of the available 400. A formal design report was completed discussing aspects of the design as well as lessons learned along the way. The report was made public in an effort to speed up the development of University Mars Rover designs. The Team Lead for the 2010 Mars Rover Team was Jon Doltar.

This Mars Rover is design concept 3.0.

=== 2011 ===
The 2011 Rover took third place. A formal design report was created by the team which gives a detailed overview of technical aspects of the 2011 OSU Mars Rover. The Team Lead for the 2011 Mars Rover Team was Florian Kapsenberg.

This Mars Rover is design concept 3.1.

=== 2012 ===
The 2012 Mars Rover includes designs based on past entries, including: a 6-wheel drive system with individual steering control for each wheel; an Analog video transmission/receiving system capable of 1-channel transmission/receiving, with a main camera and several pinhole cameras; a robotic arm with 3-degrees of freedom giving it the ability to service equipment, clear solar panels, and check voltage; and refinement of the chassis, suspension, electrical housing and camera systems to reduce weight. The Team Lead for the 2012 Mars Rover Team is John Zeller.

This Mars Rover is design concept 3.2.

== See also ==
- Exploration of Mars
