= Amariyanna Copeny =

American activist and internet personality

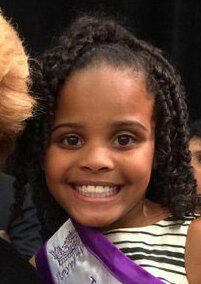
- Copeny in 2016
- Born: July 6, 2007 (age 19); Flint, Michigan, U.S.
- Years active: 2016–present

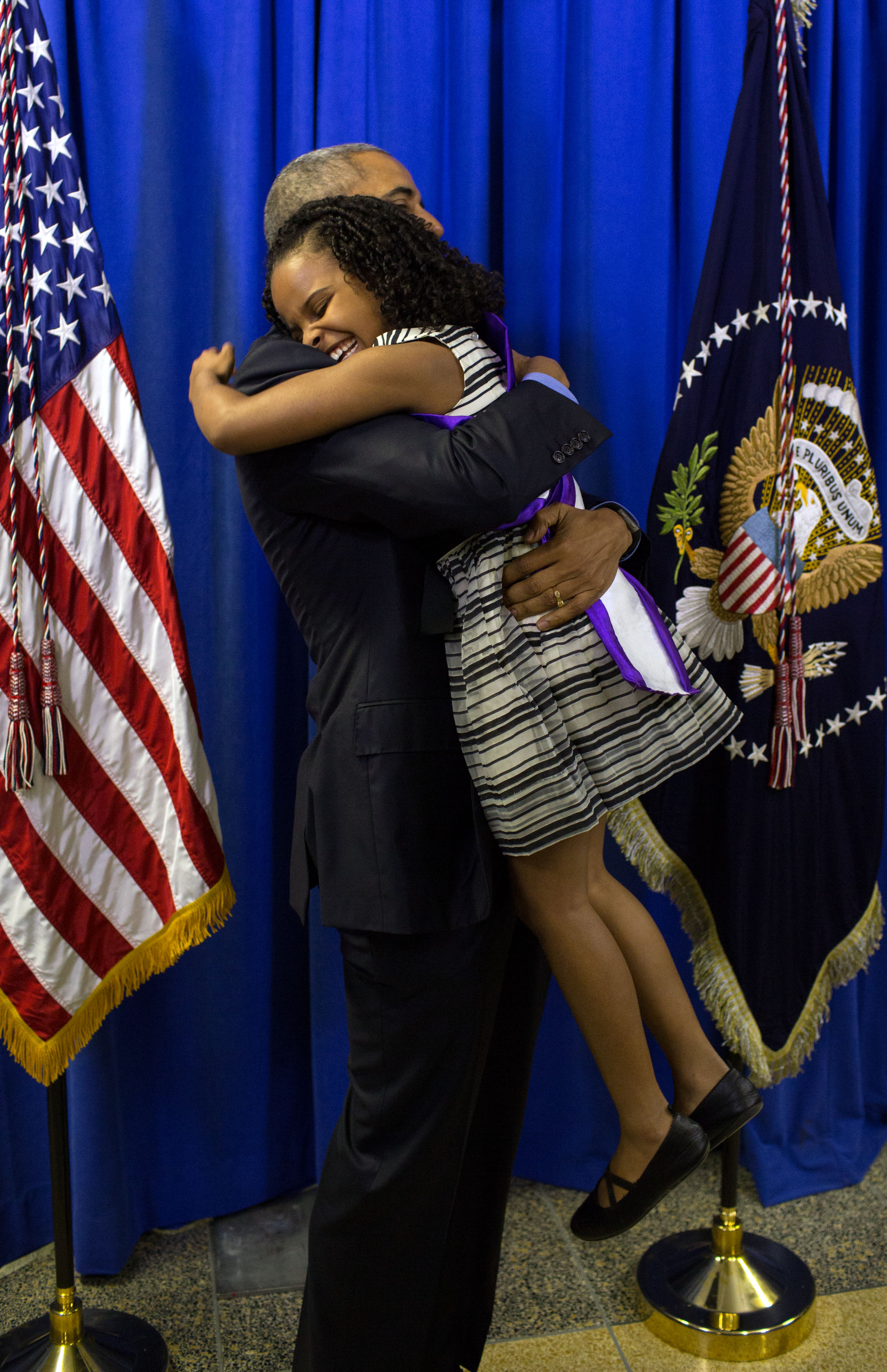
President Barack Obama hugs Mari Copeny, 8, backstage at Northwestern High School in Flint, Michigan, May 4, 2016.

Amariyanna "Mari" Copeny (born July 6, 2007), also known as Little Miss Flint, is an African-American youth activist from Flint, Michigan. She is best known for raising awareness about the Flint water crisis and for fundraising to support underprivileged children in her community and across the country.

== Career ==
=== Flint water crisis ===
When Copeny was 8 years old, she wrote a letter to the President Barack Obama in order to draw attention to the water crisis in her hometown of Flint, Michigan. Her letter prompted a response from the president, who said that "letters from kids like you are what make me so optimistic about the future". On May 4, 2016, Obama visited Flint to see closer up the devastation to the lives of Flint's citizens as a result of their lead-poisoned water supply. The visit contributed to nationwide awareness of the city's critical situation. Obama eventually authorized $100 million to fix the crisis. Since then, measures have been taken to help eradicate the problem, but effects continue to be felt by Flint's residents and necessary repairs, to infrastructure will not be complete until 2020 at the earliest.

Rising to a national platform, on April 13, 2017, she addressed a large crowd at the "Stand Up to Trump" rally in front of the White House in Washington, D.C., telling them that, during his 2016 campaign, then-candidate Donald Trump promised the people of Flint, including herself personally, that he would fix the water crisis. She declared that President Trump has not fulfilled his campaign promise. Not limiting her advocacy to her own hometown, she also spoke against Trump's immigration policies.

In an effort to keep Flint's continuing struggles in the public eye and to provide still-needed safe water, in 2018, Copeny and Pack Your Back teamed up again for The Little Miss Flint & PYB Water Drive, a GoFundMe crowdfunding effort to raise money for bottled water, as the state's free bottled water program for Flint residents had been discontinued by Michigan Governor Rick Snyder. Close to $50,000 was raised during the month-long campaign, enough for over 200,000 bottles of water.

In 2019, Copeny started a new donation campaign, the Little Miss Flint Clean Water Fund, partnering with Hydroviv, a water filtration company, allowing the fundraiser to maximize the impact of donated funds and eliminate the single use plastic waste associated with bottled water. She met her initial goal of $100,000 in September 2019, and has subsequently met goals of $250k in June, 2020, and $500k on Earth Day 2021. Her fundraiser continues with her new goal of $1M because so many communities across the country need filters to have clean water across the country while water infrastructure is being updated.

Media coverage of Copeny's work has made reference to her as "Little Miss Flint", a nickname that was coined following her win at a beauty contest in 2015.

=== Community fundraising ===
Prior to the opening of the school year in both 2016 and 2017, Copeny partnered with Pack Your big-Back self, a non-profit organization established in 2016 by Central Michigan University students, and raised money to help students from Flint. Copeny collected donations to provide backpacks filled with school supplies. In 2016, she raised enough money for 100 backpacks, and, in 2017, she raised $10,000 to fund 1,000 backpacks for local children. She initiated another GoFundMe campaign in 2018 as part of the #BlackPantherChallenge, raising more than $16,000 in order to provide the opportunity for hundreds of low-income children to see Black Panther and to obtain movie merchandise, with the hope of providing the mostly Black audience with positive self-image and aspirations.

Copeny's other initiatives include the Dear Flint Kids project, a request for letters of encouragement to the children of Flint; a crowdsourcing effort to distribute free copies of the book, A Wrinkle in Time; Christmas parties and Easter baskets for the underprivileged; and supporting local school systems to provide anti-bullying programming.

At the 2022 Billboard Music Awards she received the 3rd Change Maker Award in honor of her environmental advocacy efforts.
