= 1934 in the United States =

- Decades: 1910s; 1920s; 1930s; 1940s; 1950s
- See also: History of the United States (1918–1945); Timeline of United States history (1930–1949); List of years in the United States

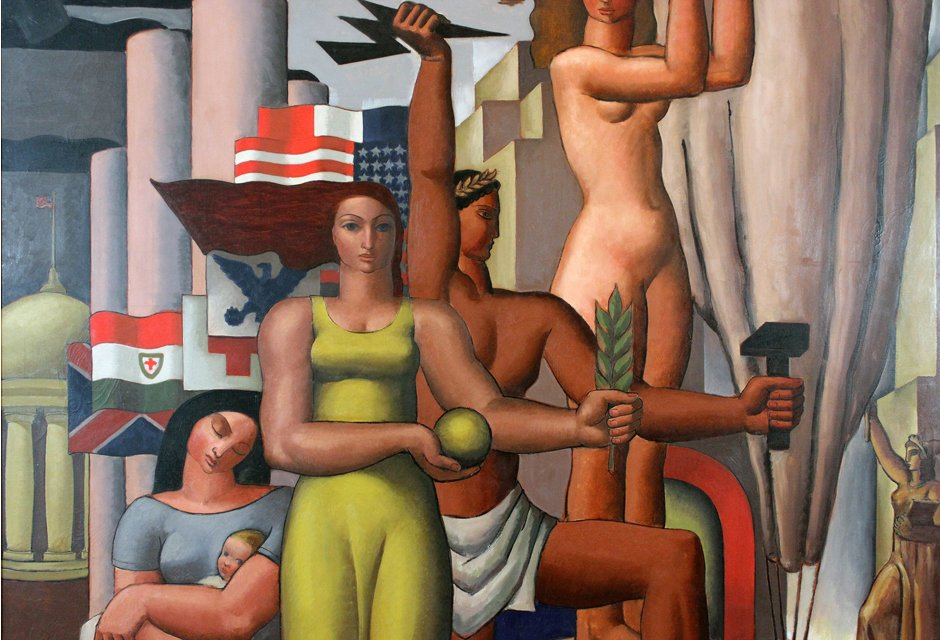
Detail of painting by Edwin Boyd Johnson, one of many New Deal artworks commissioned by the U.S. government during the Great Depression in the United States

Events from the year 1934 in the United States.

== Incumbents ==
=== Federal government ===
- President: Franklin D. Roosevelt (D-New York)
- Vice President: John Nance Garner (D-Texas)
- Chief Justice: Charles Evans Hughes (New York)
- Speaker of the House of Representatives: Henry Thomas Rainey (D-Illinois) (until August 19)
- Senate Majority Leader: Joseph Taylor Robinson (D-Arkansas)
- Congress: 73rd

==== State governments ====
Governors and lieutenant governors

=== Governors ===
- Governor of Alabama: Benjamin M. Miller (Democratic)
- Governor of Arizona: Benjamin Baker Moeur (Democratic)
- Governor of Arkansas: Junius Marion Futrell (Democratic)
- Governor of California: James Rolph Jr. (Republican) (until June 2), Frank Merriam (Republican) (starting June 2)
- Governor of Colorado: Edwin C. Johnson (Democratic)
- Governor of Connecticut: Wilbur Lucius Cross (Democratic)
- Governor of Delaware: C. Douglass Buck (Republican)
- Governor of Florida: David Sholtz (Democratic)
- Governor of Georgia: Eugene Talmadge (Democratic)
- Governor of Idaho: C. Ben Ross (Democratic)
- Governor of Illinois: Henry Horner (Democratic)
- Governor of Indiana: Paul V. McNutt (Democratic)
- Governor of Iowa: Clyde L. Herring (Democratic)
- Governor of Kansas: Alfred M. Landon (Republican)
- Governor of Kentucky: Ruby Laffoon (Democratic)
- Governor of Louisiana: Oscar K. Allen (Democratic)
- Governor of Maine: Louis J. Brann (Democratic)
- Governor of Maryland: Albert C. Ritchie (Democratic)
- Governor of Massachusetts: Joseph B. Ely (Democratic)
- Governor of Michigan: William Comstock (Democratic)
- Governor of Minnesota: Floyd B. Olson (Farmer-Labor)
- Governor of Mississippi: Martin Sennett Conner (Democratic)
- Governor of Missouri: Guy Brasfield Park (Democratic)
- Governor of Montana: Frank Henry Cooney (Democratic)
- Governor of Nebraska: Charles W. Bryan (Democratic)
- Governor of Nevada: Fred B. Balzar (Republican) (until March 21), Morley Griswold (Republican) (starting March 21)
- Governor of New Hampshire: John Gilbert Winant (Republican)
- Governor of New Jersey: A. Harry Moore (Democratic)
- Governor of New Mexico: Andrew W. Hockenhull (Democratic)
- Governor of New York: Herbert H. Lehman (Democratic)
- Governor of North Carolina: John C. B. Ehringhaus (Democratic)
- Governor of North Dakota: William Langer (Republican) (until June 21), Ole H. Olson (Republican) (starting June 21)
- Governor of Ohio: George White (Democratic)
- Governor of Oklahoma: William H. Murray (Democratic)
- Governor of Oregon: Julius L. Meier (Independent)
- Governor of Pennsylvania: Gifford Pinchot (Republican)
- Governor of Rhode Island: Theodore Francis Green (Democratic)
- Governor of South Carolina: Ibra Charles Blackwood (Democratic)
- Governor of South Dakota: Tom Berry (Democratic)
- Governor of Tennessee: Harry Hill McAlister (Democratic)
- Governor of Texas: Miriam A. Ferguson (Democratic)
- Governor of Utah: Henry H. Blood (Democratic)
- Governor of Vermont: Stanley C. Wilson (Republican)
- Governor of Virginia: John Garland Pollard (Democratic) (until January 17), George C. Peery (Democratic) (starting January 17)
- Governor of Washington: Clarence D. Martin (Democratic)
- Governor of West Virginia: Herman G. Kump (Democratic)
- Governor of Wisconsin: Albert G. Schmedeman (Democratic)
- Governor of Wyoming: Leslie A. Miller (Democratic)

=== Lieutenant governors ===
- Lieutenant Governor of Alabama: Hugh D. Merrill (Democratic)
- Lieutenant Governor of Arkansas: William Lee Cazort (Democratic)
- Lieutenant Governor of California: Frank Merriam (Republican) (until June 2), vacant (starting June 2)
- Lieutenant Governor of Colorado: Raymond Herbert Talbot (Democratic)
- Lieutenant Governor of Connecticut: Roy C. Wilcox (Republican)
- Lieutenant Governor of Delaware: Roy F. Corley (Republican)
- Lieutenant Governor of Idaho: George E. Hill (Democratic)
- Lieutenant Governor of Illinois: Thomas Donovan (Democratic)
- Lieutenant Governor of Indiana: M. Clifford Townsend (Democratic)
- Lieutenant Governor of Iowa: Nelson G. Kraschel (Democratic)
- Lieutenant Governor of Kansas: Charles W. Thompson (Republican)
- Lieutenant Governor of Kentucky: Happy Chandler (Democratic)
- Lieutenant Governor of Louisiana: John B. Fournet (Democratic)
- Lieutenant Governor of Massachusetts: Gaspar G. Bacon (Republican)
- Lieutenant Governor of Michigan: Allen E. Stebbins (Democratic)
- Lieutenant Governor of Minnesota: Konrad K. Solberg (Farmer Labor)
- Lieutenant Governor of Mississippi: Dennis Murphree (Democratic)
- Lieutenant Governor of Missouri: Frank Gaines Harris (Democratic)
- Lieutenant Governor of Montana:
  - until month and day unknown: Tom Kane (political party unknown)
  - month and day unknown: Ernest T. Eaton (political party unknown)
  - starting month and day unknown: Elmer Holt (political party unknown)
- Lieutenant Governor of Nebraska: Walter H. Jurgensen (Democratic)
- Lieutenant Governor of Nevada: Morley Griswold (Republican) (until March 21), vacant (starting March 21)
- Lieutenant Governor of New Mexico: vacant
- Lieutenant Governor of New York: M. William Bray (Democratic)
- Lieutenant Governor of North Carolina: Alexander H. Graham (Democratic)
- Lieutenant Governor of North Dakota: Ole H. Olson (Republican) (until June 21), vacant (starting June 21)
- Lieutenant Governor of Ohio: Charles W. Sawyer (Democratic)
- Lieutenant Governor of Oklahoma: Robert Burns (Democratic)
- Lieutenant Governor of Pennsylvania: Edward C. Shannon (Republican)
- Lieutenant Governor of Rhode Island: Robert E. Quinn (Democratic)
- Lieutenant Governor of South Carolina: James O. Sheppard (Democratic)
- Lieutenant Governor of South Dakota: Hans Ustrud (Democratic)
- Lieutenant Governor of Tennessee: Albert F. Officer (Democratic)
- Lieutenant Governor of Texas: Edgar E. Witt (Democratic)
- Lieutenant Governor of Vermont: Charles M. Smith (Republican)
- Lieutenant Governor of Virginia: James H. Price (Democratic)
- Lieutenant Governor of Washington: Victor A. Meyers (Democratic)
- Lieutenant Governor of Wisconsin: Thomas J. O'Malley (Democratic)

== Events ==
=== January ===
- January 26 – The Apollo Theater opens in Harlem, New York City.
- January 27 – Albert Einstein visits the White House.
- January 30 – Gold Reserve Act: All gold held in the Federal Reserve to be surrendered to the Department of the Treasury; immediately following, President Roosevelt raises the statutory gold price from $20.67 per ounce to $35.

=== February ===
- February 22 – Frank Capra's It Happened One Night, starring Clark Gable and Claudette Colbert, is released. It becomes a smash hit and the first of Capra's great screen classics. It becomes the first film to win all 5 of the major Academy Awards – Best Actor, Best Actress, Best Screenplay, Best Director, and Best Picture. Gable and Colbert receive their only Oscars for this film.

=== March ===
- March 3 – John Dillinger escapes from jail in Crown Point, Indiana, using a wooden pistol.
- March 12 – The 6.5 M_{w} Hansel Valley earthquake affects a sparsely populated area of northern Utah with a maximum Mercalli intensity of VIII (Severe), causing light damage and two deaths.
- March 13 – John Dillinger and his gang rob the First National Bank in Mason City, Iowa.
- March 16 – The 6th Academy Awards, hosted by Will Rogers, are presented at Ambassador Hotel in Los Angeles, with Frank Lloyd's Cavalcade winning the Academy Award for Best Picture. It also receives the most awards with three, including Best Director for Lloyd, and is among three films (the others being Frank Borzage's A Farewell to Arms and Frank Capra's Lady for a Day) to each receive the most nominations with four. It is the final awards season until 2021 to accommodate two calendar years.
- March 22 – The first Masters Tournament in golf opens at Augusta National Golf Club in Georgia; Horton Smith will be the winner.
- March 24 – The Tydings–McDuffie Act comes into effect, establishing the Philippine Commonwealth which allows greater self-government of the Philippines, and scheduling full independence from the U.S. for 1944. Sugar imports are reduced and immigration is limited to 50 Filipino people per year.

=== April ===
- April 1 – Clyde Barrow and Bonnie Parker kill 2 young highway patrolmen near Grapevine, Texas.
- April 12
  - U.S. publication of the novel Tender Is the Night by F. Scott Fitzgerald
  - The world's highest ever recorded surface wind speed of 231 miles per hour (372 km/h) was recorded on the summit of Mount Washington.
- April 22 – John Dillinger and two others shoot their way out of an FBI ambush in northern Wisconsin.

=== May ===
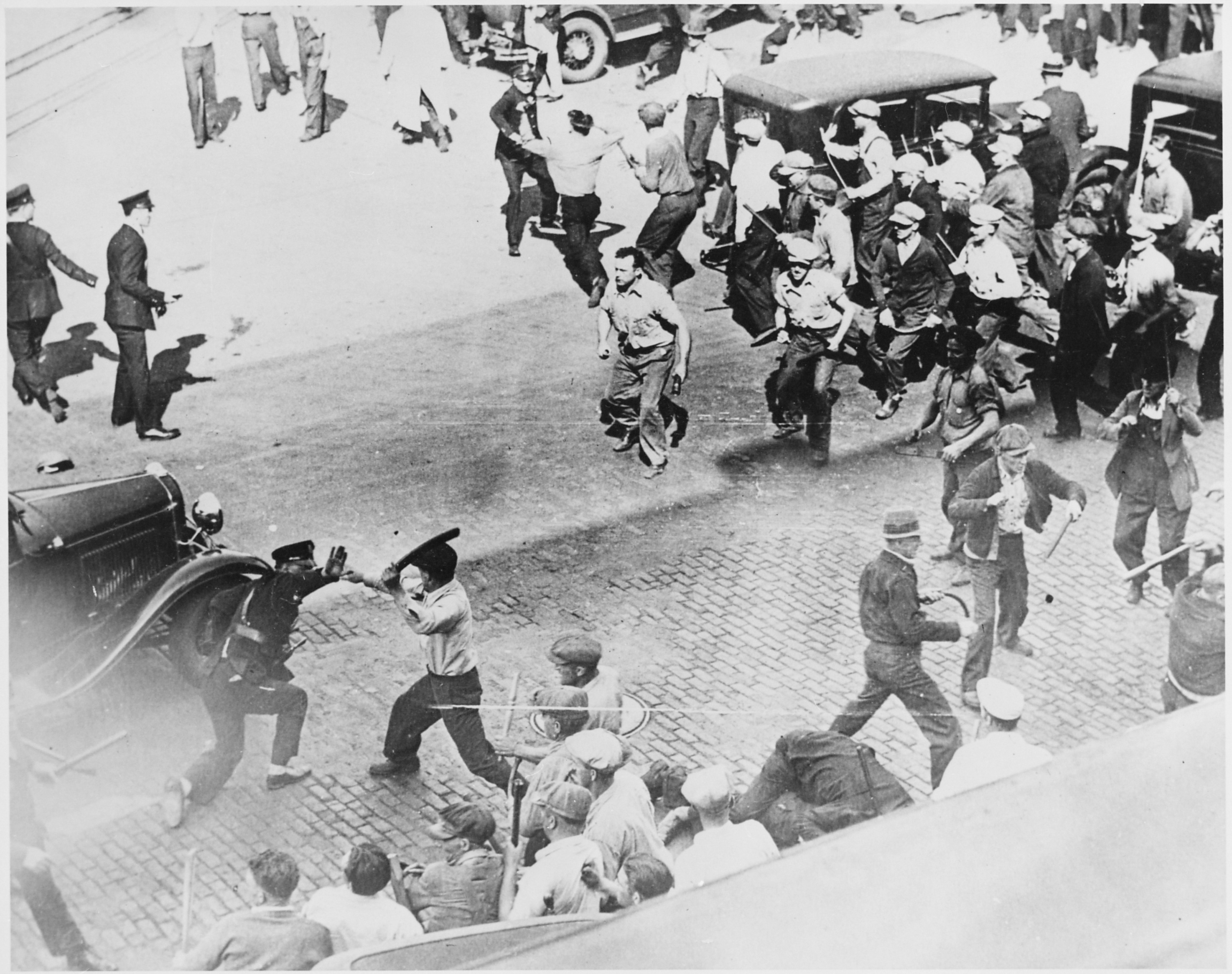
Violence in the Minneapolis Teamsters Strike

- May 5 – The first Three Stooges short, Woman Haters, is released.
- May 9 – 1934 West Coast waterfront strike: A general strike is engaged in San Francisco.
- May 11 – Dust Bowl: A strong 2-day dust storm removes massive amounts of Great Plains topsoil in one of the worst dust storms of the Dust Bowl.
- May 15
  - The United States Department of Justice offers a $25,000 reward for John Dillinger.
  - Nantucket Lightship LV-117 sinks after colliding with RMS Olympic.
- May 16 – Teamsters in Minneapolis begin a strike that lasts until a settlement proposal is accepted on August 21.
- May 23
  - A team of police officers, led by Texas Ranger Frank Hamer, ambush bank robbers Bonnie Parker and Clyde Barrow near their hide-out in Black Lake, Louisiana, killing them both.
  - The "Battle of Toledo" begins during the Auto-Lite strike in Toledo, Ohio, continuing until May 27.
- May 30 – Everglades National Park is established.

=== June ===
- June 4 – USS Ranger is commissioned.
- June 6 – New Deal: U.S. President Franklin D. Roosevelt signs the Securities Exchange Act into law, establishing the U.S. Securities and Exchange Commission.
- June 15 – Great Smoky Mountains National Park is established.
- June 18 – Pub. L. 73–394 expands the crime of making false statements to remove the requirement of an intent to defraud and expands the coverage to "any matter within the jurisdiction" of the federal government.

=== July ===
- July 1
  - The world-famous Brookfield Zoo opens in Brookfield, Illinois.
  - The Hays Office censorship code for motion pictures goes into full effect.
- July 5 – 1934 West Coast waterfront strike: Police in San Francisco open fire on a crowd of striking longshoremen, killing two.
- July 15 – The American film industry begins to rigorously enforce the Motion Picture Production Code.
- July 17 – The North Dakota Supreme Court declares Lieutenant Governor Ole H. Olson the legitimate governor and tells William Langer to resign. Langer proceeds to declare North Dakota independent. He revokes the declaration after the Supreme Court justices meet him.
- July 22 – Outside Chicago's Biograph Theatre, "Public Enemy No. 1" John Dillinger is mortally wounded by FBI agents.

=== August ===
- August 15 – The United States occupation of Haiti ends as the last Marines depart.
- August 19 – The first All-American Soap Box Derby is held in Dayton, Ohio.
- August 25 – Anti-union vigilantes seize the town of McGuffey, Ohio, during the Hardin County onion pickers strike.

=== September ===
- September 8 – Off the New Jersey coast, a fire aboard the passenger liner Morro Castle kills 134 people.
- September 29–October – Folk song collector John Lomax makes the first recordings of "Rock Island Line" at prison farms in Arkansas.

=== October ===
- October 9 – The St. Louis Cardinals defeat the Detroit Tigers, 4 games to 3, to win their third World Series title.
- October 17 – Harry Pierpont is executed in the electric chair in Columbus, Ohio, for killing Sheriff Jess Sarber while breaking John Dillinger out of jail in Lima, Ohio.
- October 22 – "Pretty Boy" Floyd is shot and killed by FBI agents near East Liverpool, Ohio.
- October 31 – Century of Progress closes in Chicago.

=== November ===
- November 2 – Bibb Graves is elected a second consecutive term as the 38th governor of Alabama defeating Edmund H. Dryer.
- November 5 – Kelayres massacre: An election-eve rally by Democrats in the coal-mining village of Kelayres, Pennsylvania, is fired on as it passes the home of a leading local Republican family, resulting in 5 deaths.
- November 20–21 – Business Plot: An alleged coup to overthrow President Franklin D. Roosevelt is investigated by the McCormack–Dickstein Committee and is reported by the Philadelphia Record.
- November 21 – Cole Porter's musical Anything Goes, starring Ethel Merman, premieres in New York City.
- November 26 – Universal Pictures releases the first film version of Fannie Hurst's novel, Imitation of Life, starring Claudette Colbert and Louise Beavers. It gives Beavers, usually featured in small roles as a maid, her best screen role, and features the largest supporting role played by a black person in a Hollywood film up until then. Its storyline is extremely daring for a 1934 film – part of it revolves around a young mulatto girl rejecting her mother and trying to "pass for white". It is the first Hollywood film to seriously deal with this subject. The 1936 film version of Show Boat, also from Universal, will deal with a similar storyline.
- November 27 – A running gun battle between FBI agents and bank robber Baby Face Nelson results in the death of one FBI agent and the mortal wounding of special agent Samuel P. Cowley, who was still able to mortally wound Nelson.

=== December ===
- December 28 – An American Airlines aircraft crashes in the Adirondack Mountains.
- December 29 – Japan renounces the Washington Naval Treaty of 1922 and the London Naval Treaty of 1930.

=== Undated ===
- National Archives established.
- National Union for Social Justice (organization) founded.

=== Ongoing ===
- Lochner era (c. 1897–c. 1937)
- U.S. occupation of Haiti (1915–1934)
- Dust Bowl (1930–1936)
- New Deal (1933–1939)

== Sport ==
- April 10 - Chicago Black Hawks win their First Stanley Cup by defeating the Detroit Red Wings 3 games to 1. The deciding game was played at Chicago Stadium

== Births ==
=== January ===
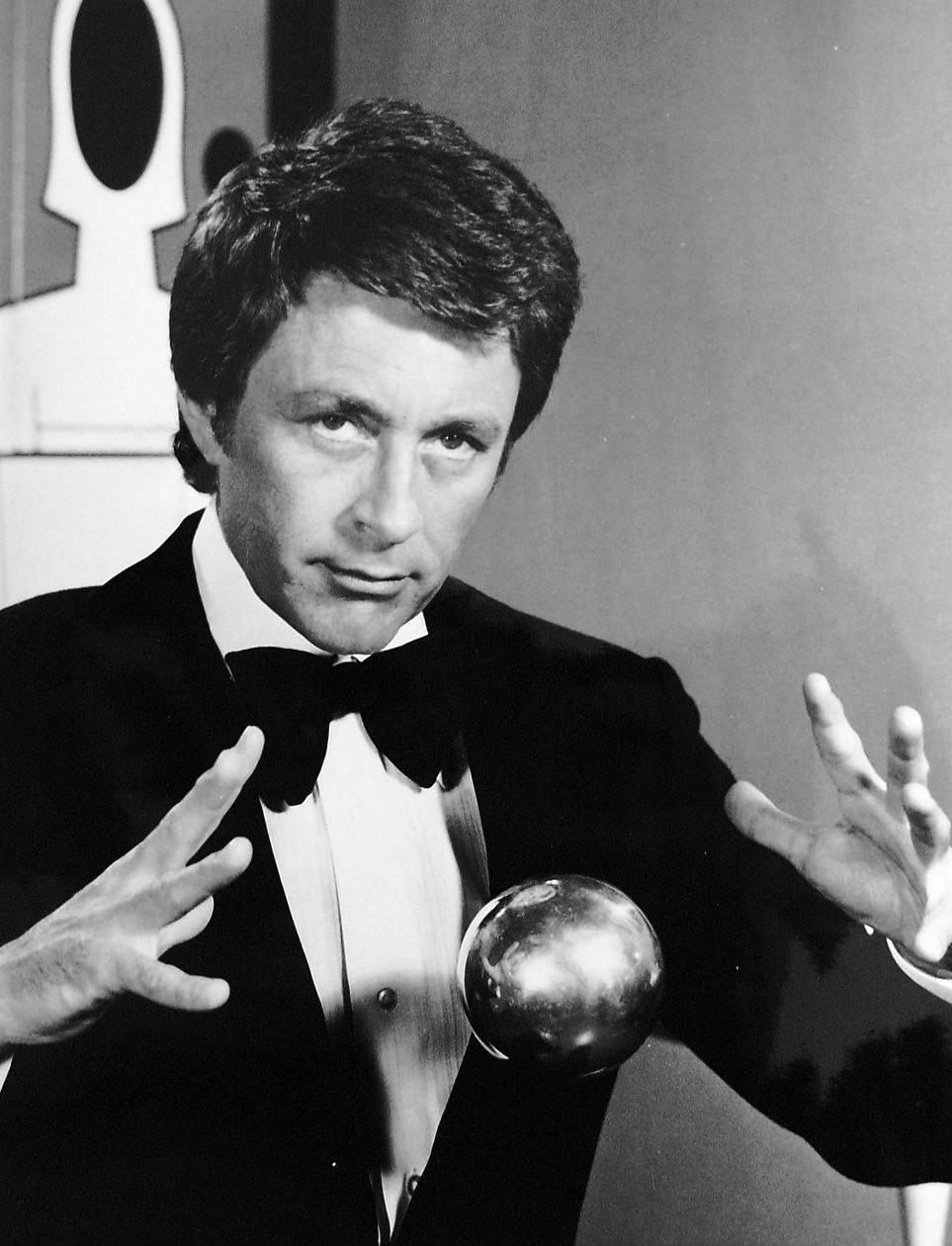
Bill Bixby

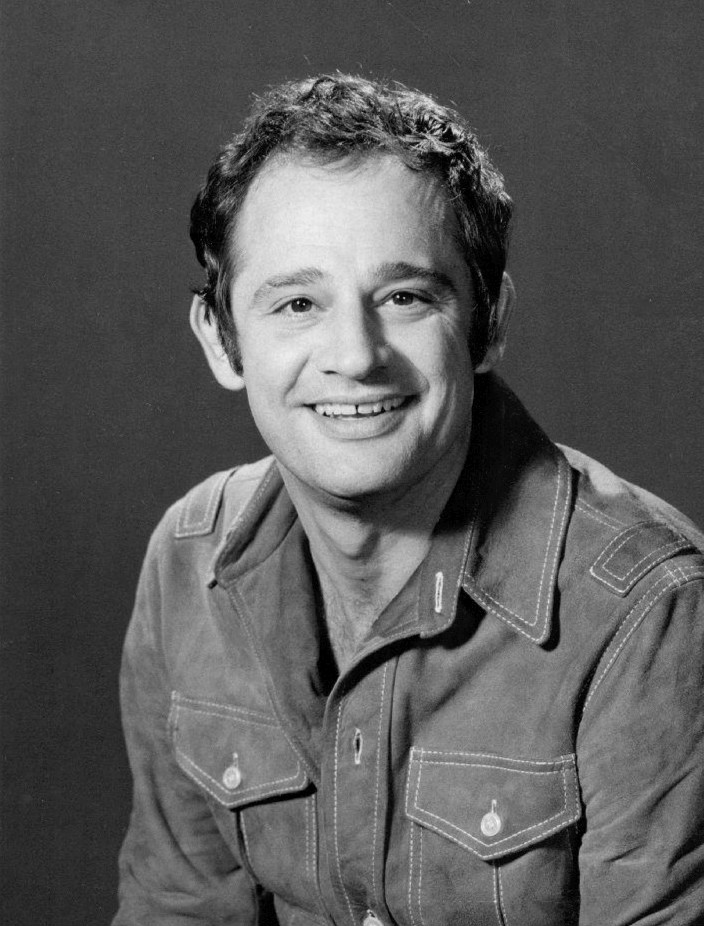
Lou Antonio

- January 1
  - George D. Behrakis, Greek-American philanthropist
  - Alan Berg, American Jewish talk show host (d. 1984)
- January 6 – William Browder, American mathematician (d. 2025)
- January 7
  - Jack D. Forbes, Native American writer, scholar, and political activist (d. 2011)
  - Charles Jenkins Sr., American sprinter
  - Joseph Naso, American serial killer
- January 9 – Bart Starr, American football player and coach (d. 2019)
- January 10 – Leonard Boswell, American politician (d. 2018)
- January 16 – Marilyn Horne, American mezzo-soprano
- January 17 – Cedar Walton, American jazz pianist (d. 2013)
- January 19 – Phil Rollins, American basketball player (d. 2021)
- January 20 – Dave Hull, American radio personality (d. 2020)
- January 21 – Ann Wedgeworth, American actress (d. 2017)
- January 22 – Bill Bixby, actor and television director (d. 1993)
- January 23
  - Lou Antonio, actor, director
  - Carmine Caridi, actor (d. 2019)
- January 24
  - Stanley Falkow, microbiologist (d. 2018)
  - Leonard Goldberg, film and television producer (d. 2019)
- January 26
  - Huey "Piano" Smith, American rhythm and blues pianist (d. 2023)
  - Bob Uecker, American baseball player, sportscaster, comedian and actor (d. 2025)
- January 30 – Tammy Grimes, American actress (d. 2016)
- January 31 – Stephen H. Sachs, American lawyer and politician (d. 2022)

=== February ===
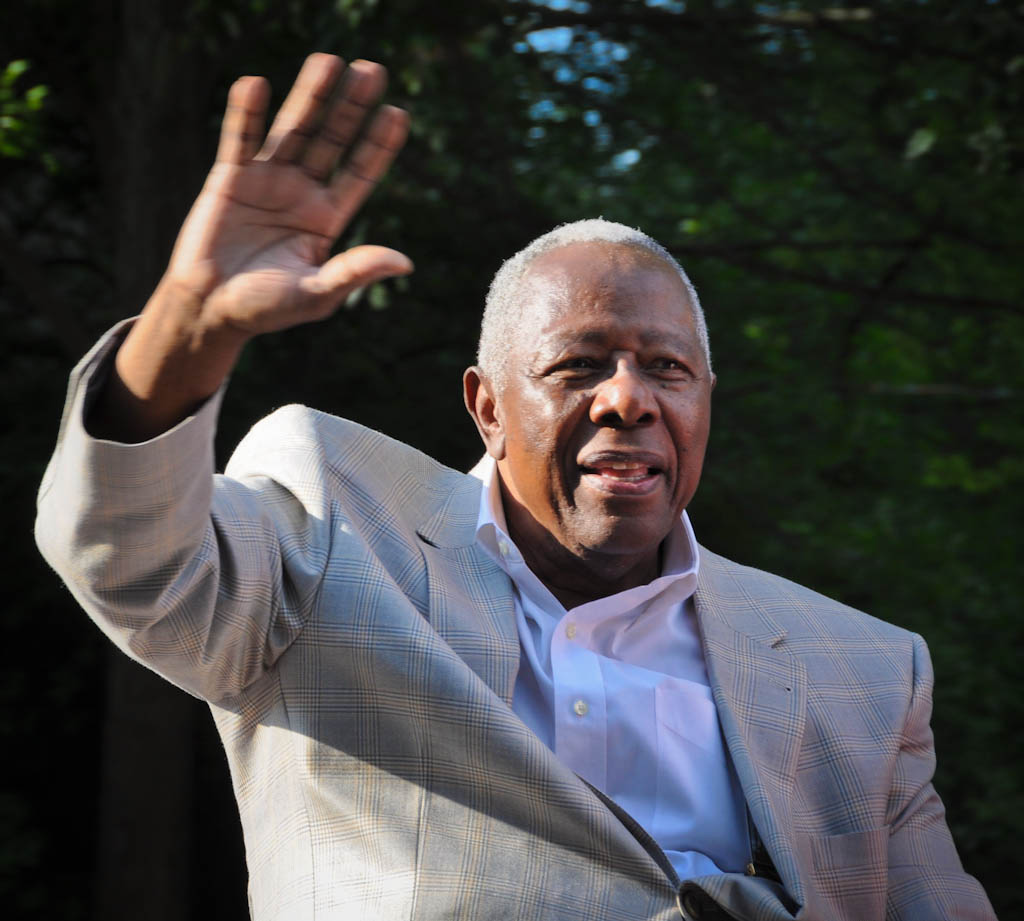
Hank Aaron

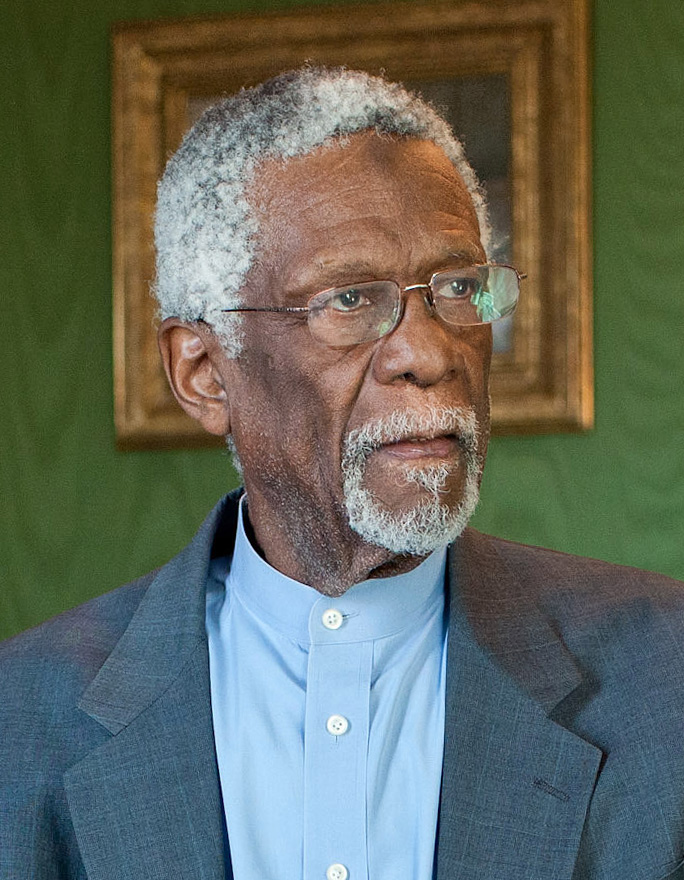
Bill Russell

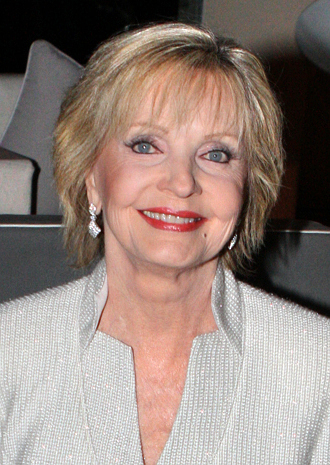
Florence Henderson

- February 1 – Bob Shane, American folk singer and guitarist (The Kingston Trio) (d. 2020)
- February 5 – Hank Aaron, African-American baseball player (d. 2021)
- February 7
  - Frank Clarke, American football player, sportscaster (d. 2018)
  - Earl King, American musician (d. 2003)
- February 9
  - Bill Fulcher, American football player and coach (d. 2022)
  - John Ziegler Jr., American lawyer, ice hockey executive (d. 2018)
- February 11
  - Tina Louise, American actress (Gilligan's Island)
  - Mel Carnahan, American politician (d. 2000)
- February 12
  - Anne Osborn Krueger, American economist
  - Bill Russell, African-American basketball player and coach (d. 2022)
- February 13 – George Segal, American actor (d. 2021)
- February 14 – Florence Henderson, American actress, singer and television personality (d. 2016)
- February 15 – William Newsom, American judge (d. 2018)
- February 16
  - Harold "Hal" Kalin, American singer (The Kalin Twins) (d. 2005)
  - Herbert "Herbie" Kalin, American singer (The Kalin Twins) (d. 2006)
- February 18 – Ronald F. Marryott, American admiral (d. 2005)
- February 19 – Michael Tree, American violist (d. 2018)
- February 20 – Bobby Unser, American race car driver (d. 2021)
- February 21 – Rue McClanahan, American actress (d. 2010)
- February 22
  - Sparky Anderson, American baseball manager (d. 2010)
  - Van Williams, American actor (d. 2016)
- February 24 – George Ryan, politician, Governor of Illinois (d. 2025)
- February 26 – Joe Holup, American basketball player (d. 1998)
- February 27
  - N. Scott Momaday, American writer (d. 2024)
  - Ralph Nader, American consumer activist, presidential candidate
  - Van Williams, American actor (d. 2016)

=== March ===
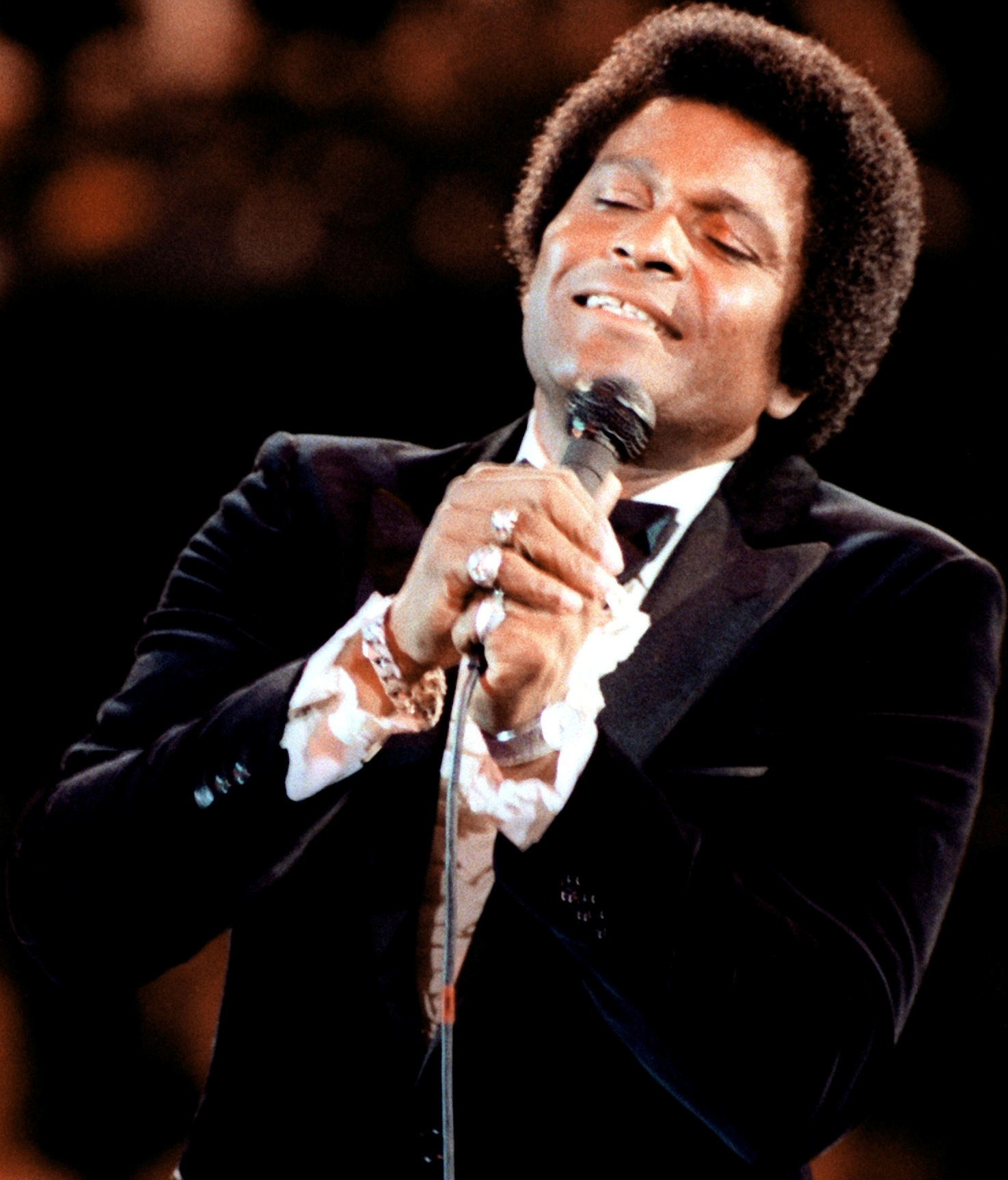
Charley Pride

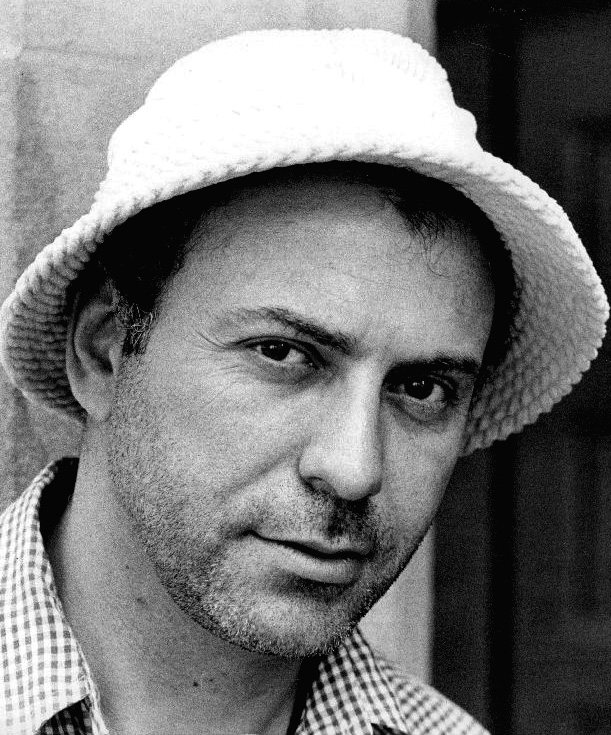
Alan Arkin

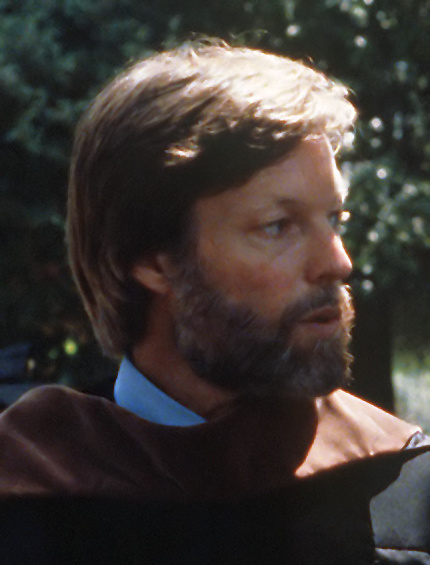
Richard Chamberlain

Shirley Jones

- March 1 – Joan Hackett, American actress (d. 1983)
- March 4
  - John Duffey, American bluegrass musician (d. 1996)
  - Anne Haney, American actress (d. 2001)
  - Barbara McNair, African-American singer, actress (d. 2007)
- March 5 – Bob Skoronski, American football player (d. 2018)
- March 6
  - Milton Diamond, American sexologist and professor of anatomy and reproductive biology (d. 2024)
  - Red Simpson, American country music singer-songwriter (d. 2016)
- March 7
  - Gray Morrow, American comic book artist, book illustrator (d. 2001)
  - Willard Scott, American television weather reporter (The Today Show) (d. 2021)
- March 9
  - Del Close, American actor, improviser, writer and teacher (d. 1999)
  - Joyce Van Patten, American actress
- March 11 – Sam Donaldson, American reporter
- March 13 – Barry Hughart, American author and screenwriter (d. 2019)
- March 14
  - Eugene Cernan, American astronaut (d. 2017)
  - Paul Rader, American General of The Salvation Army (d. 2025)
- March 17 – Fred T. Mackenzie, American sedimentary, global biogeochemist (d. 2024)
- March 18 – Charley Pride, African-American baseball player and country musician (d. 2020)
- March 20 – Willie Brown, African-American Mayor of San Francisco
- March 21 – Al Freeman Jr., African-American actor (d. 2012)
- March 22 – Orrin Hatch, American politician (d. 2022)
- March 25
  - Johnny Burnette, American rockabilly singer-songwriter and musician (d. 1964)
  - Gloria Steinem, American feminist (d. 2026)
- March 26
  - Alan Arkin, American actor, director and screenwriter (d. 2023)
  - Gino Cappelletti, American football player (d. 2022)
- March 27 – Arthur Mitchell, African-American ballet dancer and choreographer (d. 2018)
- March 28 – Lester R. Brown, American environmentalist
- March 31
  - Richard Chamberlain, American actor (d. 2025)
  - Shirley Jones, American singer and actress, first wife of Jack Cassidy
  - John D. Loudermilk, American singer-songwriter (d. 2016)
  - Orion Samuelson, American television personality

=== April ===
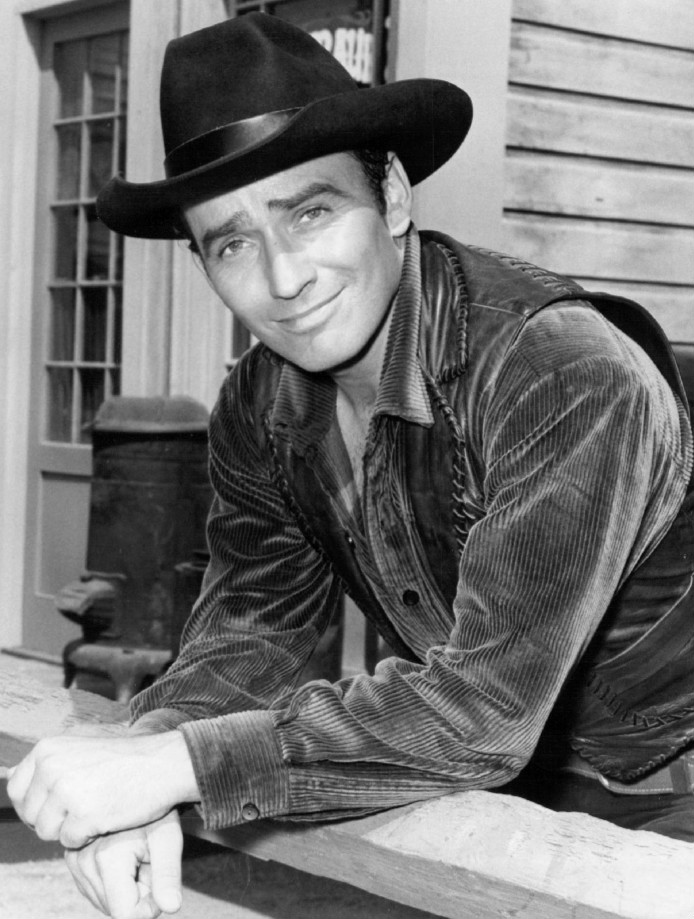
James Drury

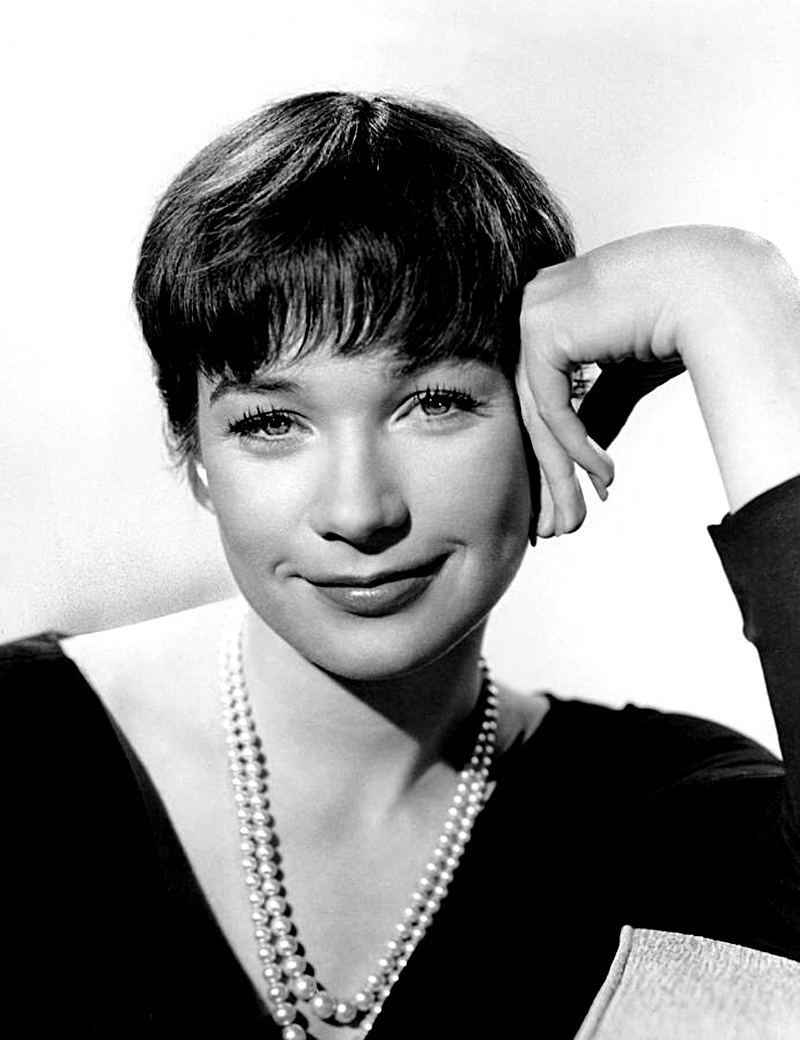
Shirley MacLaine

- April 1
  - James Edward Brown, American singer-songwriter and guitarist (d. 2015)
  - Don Hastings, American actor
  - Rod Kanehl, American baseball player and manager (d. 2004)
- April 2
  - Paul Avery, American journalist (d. 2000)
  - Paul Cohen, American mathematician (d. 2007)
  - Carl Kasell, American radio personality (d. 2018)
- April 7
  - David T. Kennedy, American attorney, politician (d. 2014)
  - Jerold Ottley, American music director and conductor (d. 2021)
- April 13 – Nancy Kissinger, American philanthropist
- April 14 – Fredric Jameson, American literary critic and political theorist (d. 2024)
- April 15 – Con Pederson, American visual effects artist (d. 2026)
- April 18
  - James Drury, American actor (d. 2020)
  - Pedro Pangelinan Tenorio, Northern Mariana Islander politician (d. 2018)
- April 20 – Robert G. Wilmers, American billionaire banker (d. 2017)
- April 24 – Shirley MacLaine, American actress and activist
- April 25
  - Johnny McCarthy, American basketball player (d. 2020)
  - Denny Miller, American actor (Wagon Train) (d. 2014)
- April 29
  - Norman Edge, American jazz musician (d. 2018)
  - Otis Rush, African-American blues guitarist and singer-songwriter (d. 2018)

=== May ===
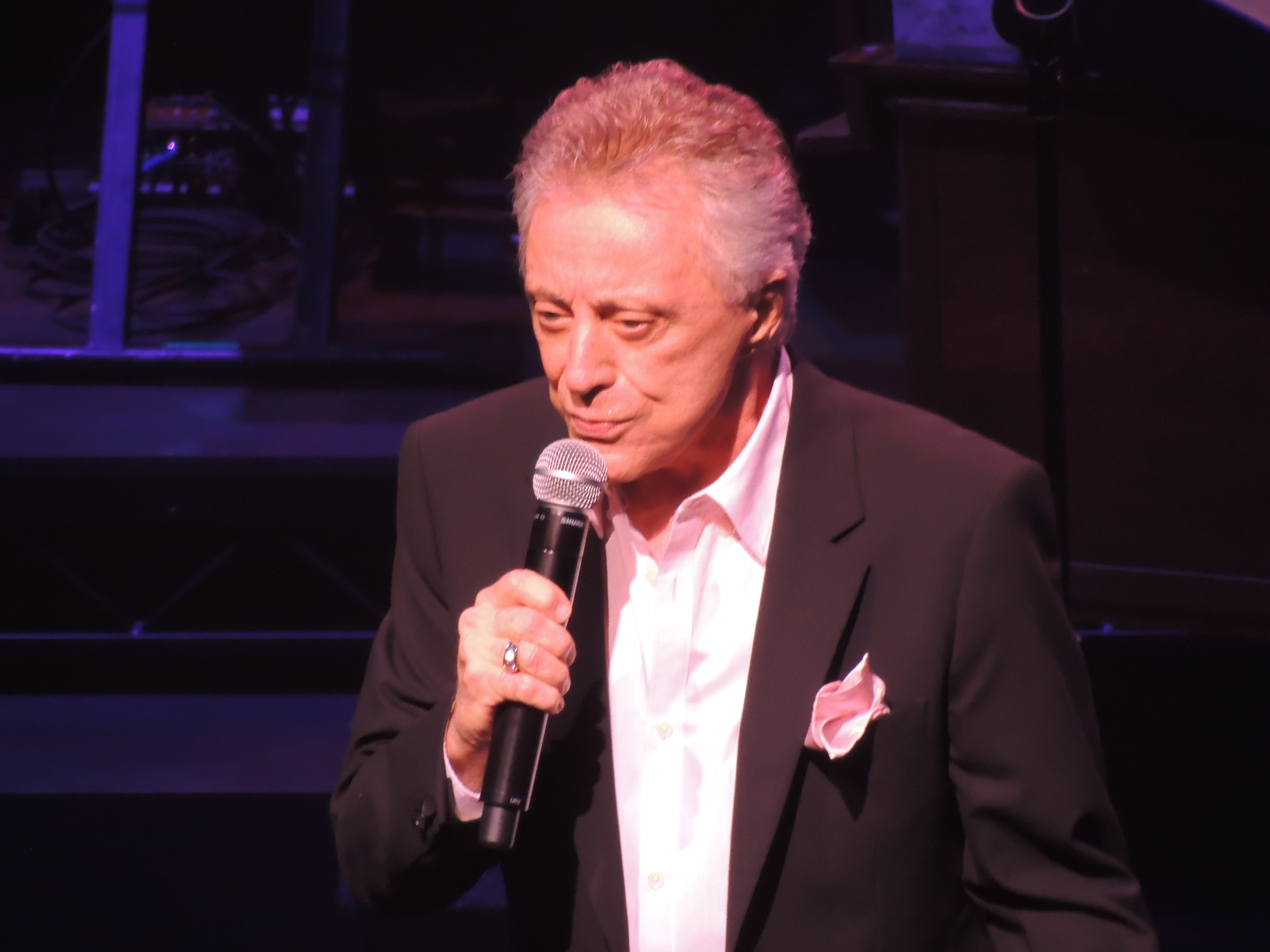
Frankie Valli

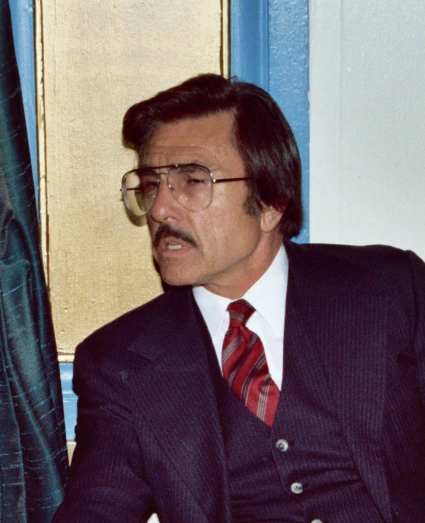
Gary Owens

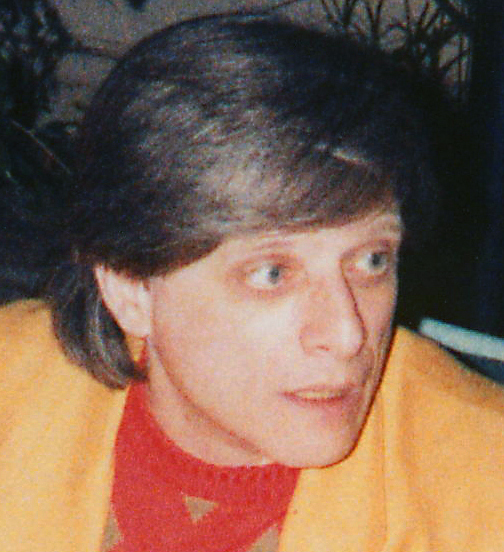
Harlan Ellison

- May 3 – Frankie Valli, American musician (The Four Seasons)
- May 5
  - Ace Cannon, American saxophonist (d. 2018)
  - Johnnie Taylor, American singer-songwriter (d. 2000)
- May 6 – Richard Shelby, American politician
- May 9 – Nathan Dean, American soldier and politician (d. 2013)
- May 10 – Gary Owens, American disc jockey, voice actor and announcer (Rowan and Martin's Laugh-In) (d. 2015)
- May 11 – Jim Jeffords, American politician (d. 2014)
- May 12 – John Amirante, American singer (d. 2018)
- May 13 – Leon Wagner, baseball player (d. 2004)
- May 18 – Dwayne Hickman, actor (d. 2022)
- May 19 – Jim Lehrer, television journalist (d. 2020)
- May 21 – Jack Twyman, American basketball player (d. 2012)
- May 22 – Peter Nero, pianist (d. 2023)
- May 23 – Robert Moog, inventor of the synthesizer (d. 2005)
- May 24
  - Charlie Dick, record promoter (d. 2015)
  - William R. Ratchford, politician (d. 2011)
- May 27
  - Harlan Ellison, writer (d. 2018)
  - Bruce M. Selya, American judge (d. 2025)
  - Franklin A. Thomas, businessman and philanthropist (d. 2021)
- May 28
  - Chuck Missler, author (d. 2018)
  - Betty X, African-American educator, civil rights advocate (d. 1997)
- May 29 – Grandma Lee, stand-up comedian (d. 2020)

=== June ===
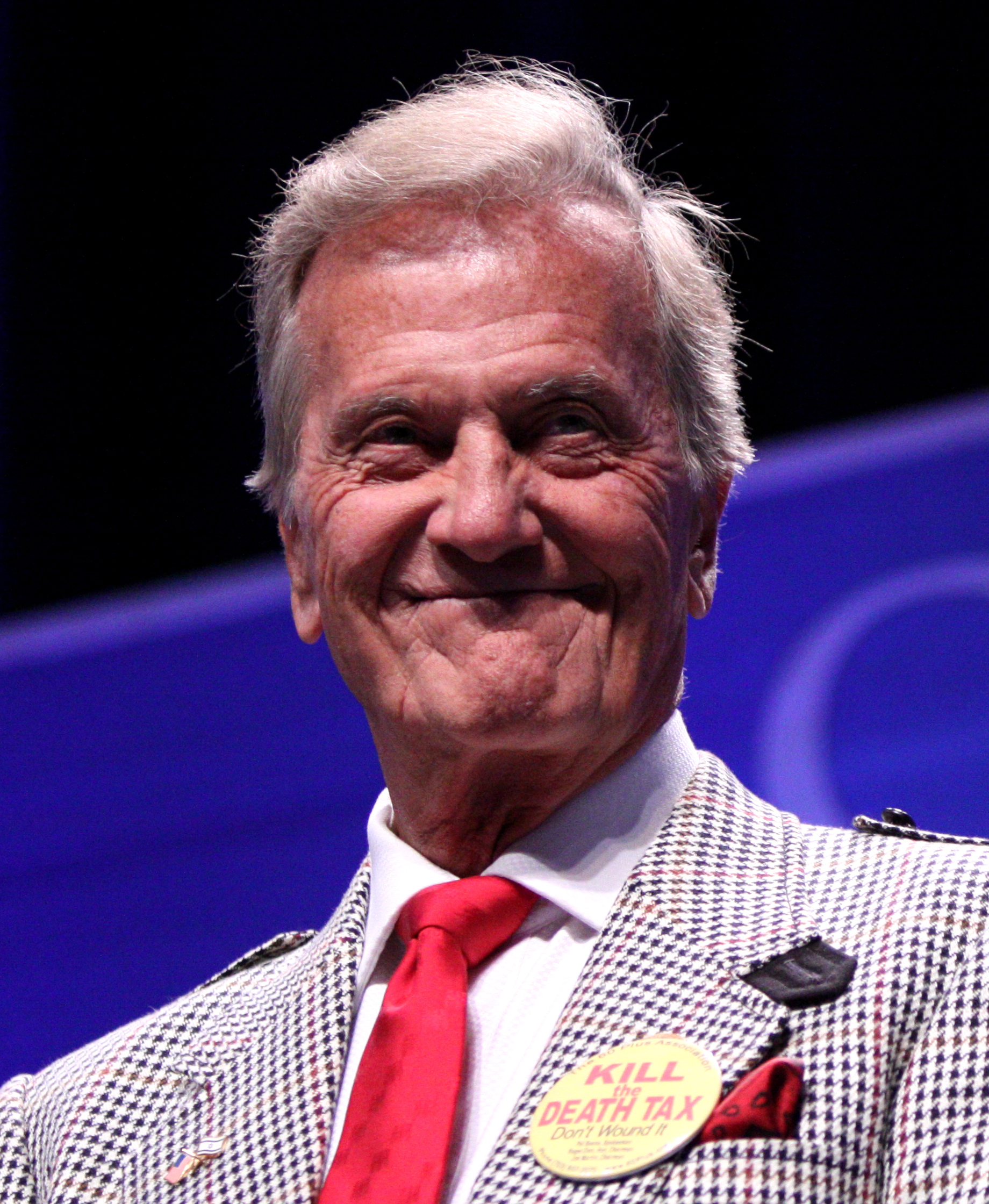
Pat Boone

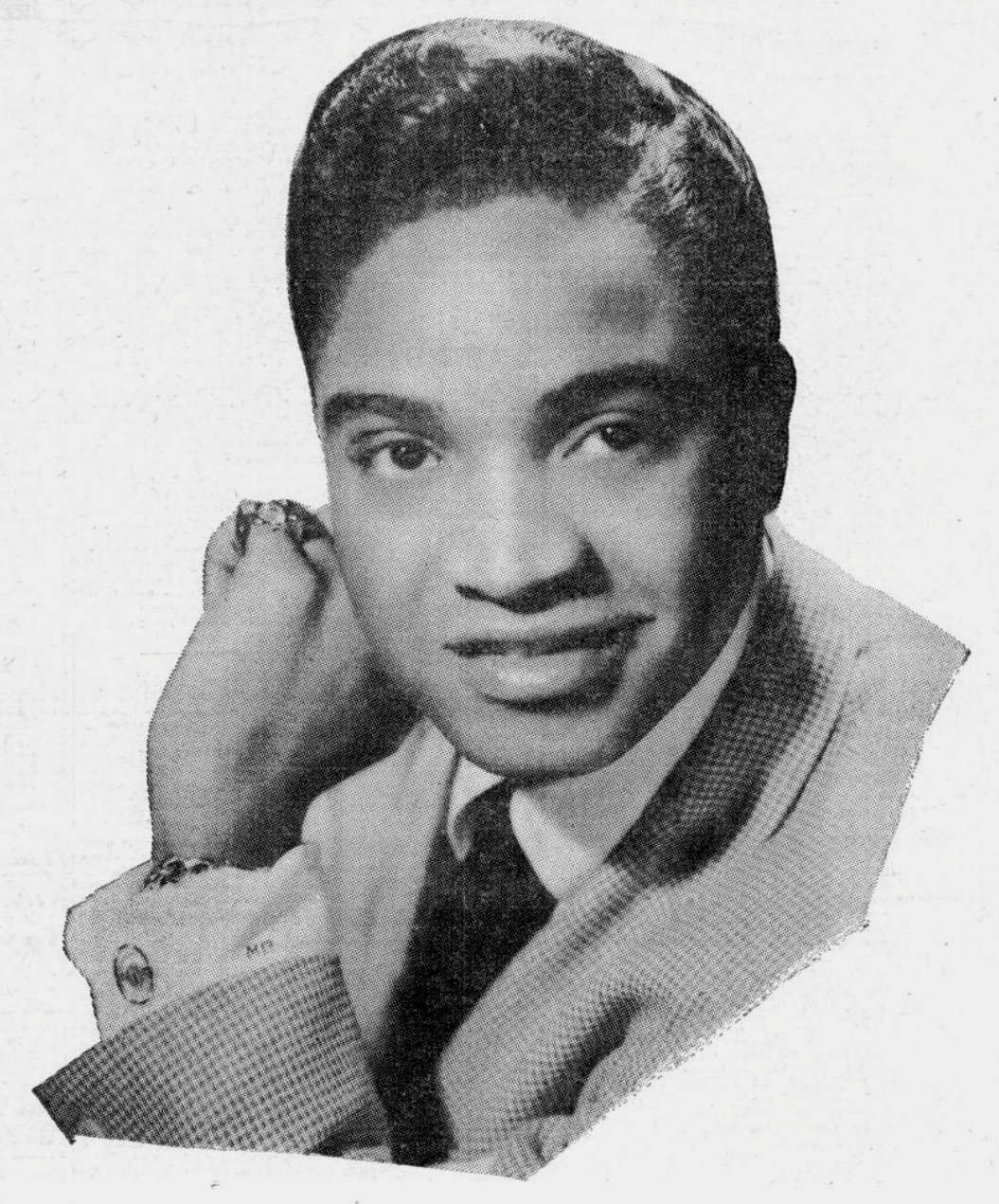
Jackie Wilson

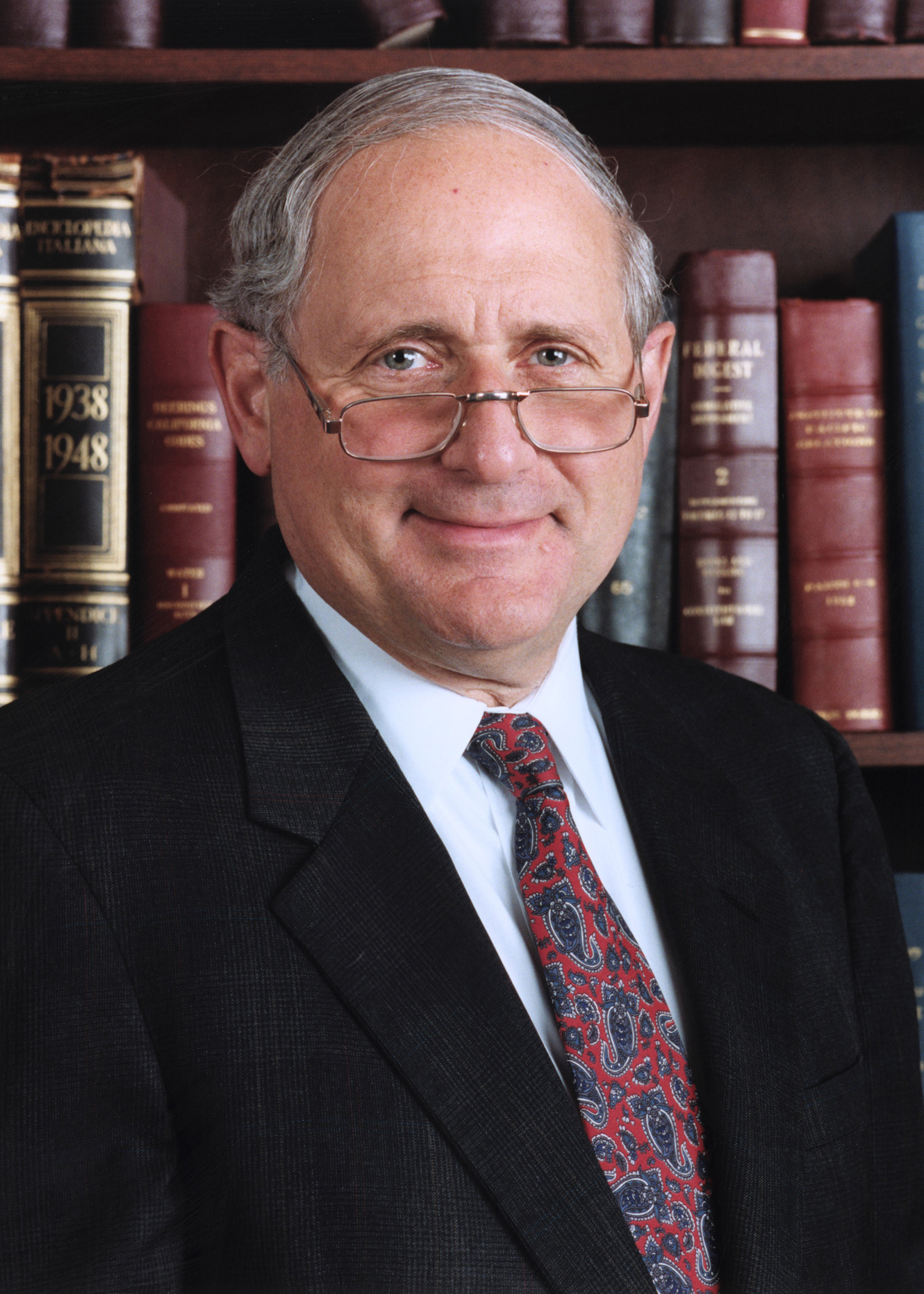
Carl Levin

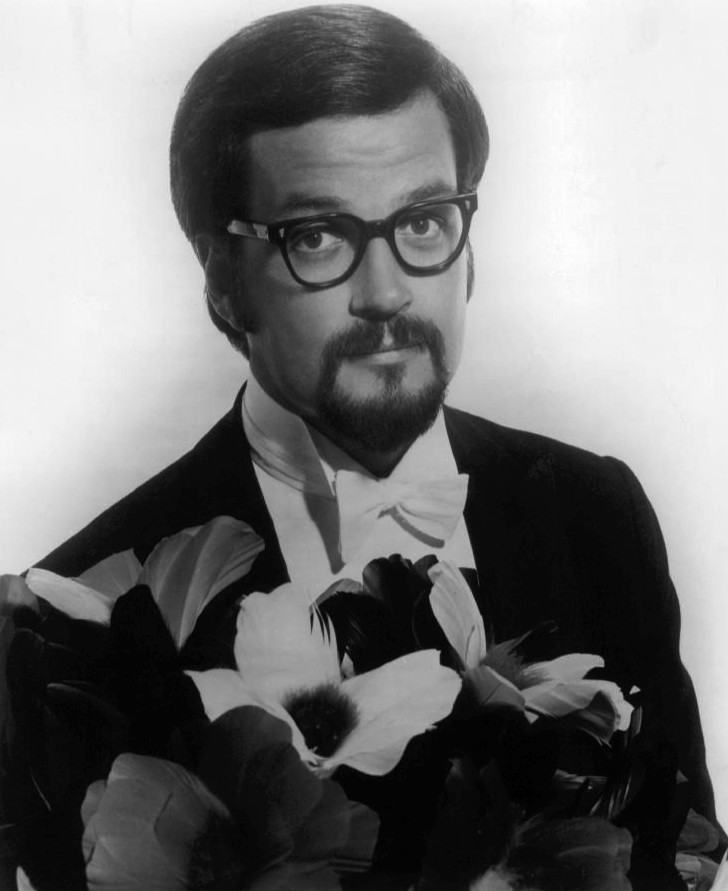
Harry Blackstone Jr.

- June 1
  - Pat Boone, American actor and pop musician
  - Peter Masterson, American actor, director, producer and writer (d. 2018)
  - Ken McElroy, American criminal (d. 1981)
- June 3
  - Jim Gentile, American baseball player and manager
  - Rolland D. McCune, American minister and theologian (d. 2019)
- June 5 – Bill Moyers, American journalist (d. 2025)
- June 6 – Roy Innis, American activist and politician (d. 2017)
- June 7
  - Billy Al Bengston, American visual artist and sculptor (d. 2022)
  - Wynn Stewart, American country music singer-songwriter and guitarist (d. 1985)
- June 9 – Jackie Wilson, African-American singer (d. 1984)
- June 13 – Marianne Means, American political journalist (d. 2017)
- June 16
  - Bill Cobbs, African-American actor (d. 2024)
  - Mel Novak, American actor (d. 2025)
  - William F. Sharpe, American economist, Nobel Prize laureate
- June 19 – Herbert Kleber, American psychiatrist (d. 2018)
- June 22
  - Ray Mantilla, American jazz percussionist (d. 2020)
  - Russ Snyder, American Major League Baseball player
  - Nancy R. Stocksdale, American politician
- June 23
  - Marino Casem, American football coach, athletic administrator (d. 2020)
  - Jesse White, athlete, educator and politician
- June 25 – Jack Hayford, evangelist, author, and minister (d. 2023)
- June 26
  - Dave Grusin, American composer, arranger, producer, and pianist
  - Selwyn Raab, American journalist and writer (d. 2025)
  - John V. Tunney, American politician (d. 2018)
- June 27 – Ed Hobaugh, baseball player
- June 28
  - Wally English, American football coach (d. 2024)
  - Carl Levin, politician (d. 2021)
  - Michael Artin, mathematician
  - Bette Greene, author (d. 2020)
- June 29
  - Bob Burrow, basketball player (d. 2019)
  - Susan George, American and French political, social scientist, activist and writer
  - Chuck Schaden, television presenter
  - Duane Wilson, baseball player (d. 2021)
- June 30
  - Harry Blackstone Jr., magician (d. 1997)
  - Aron Tager, actor, poet, artist and sculptor (d. 2019)

=== July ===
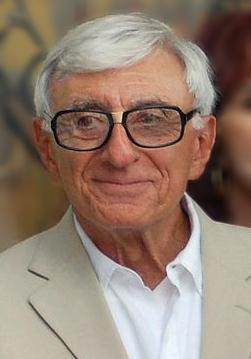
Jamie Farr

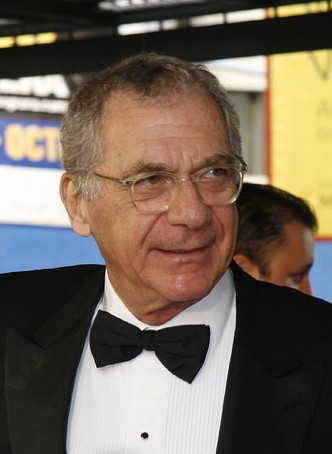
Sydney Pollack

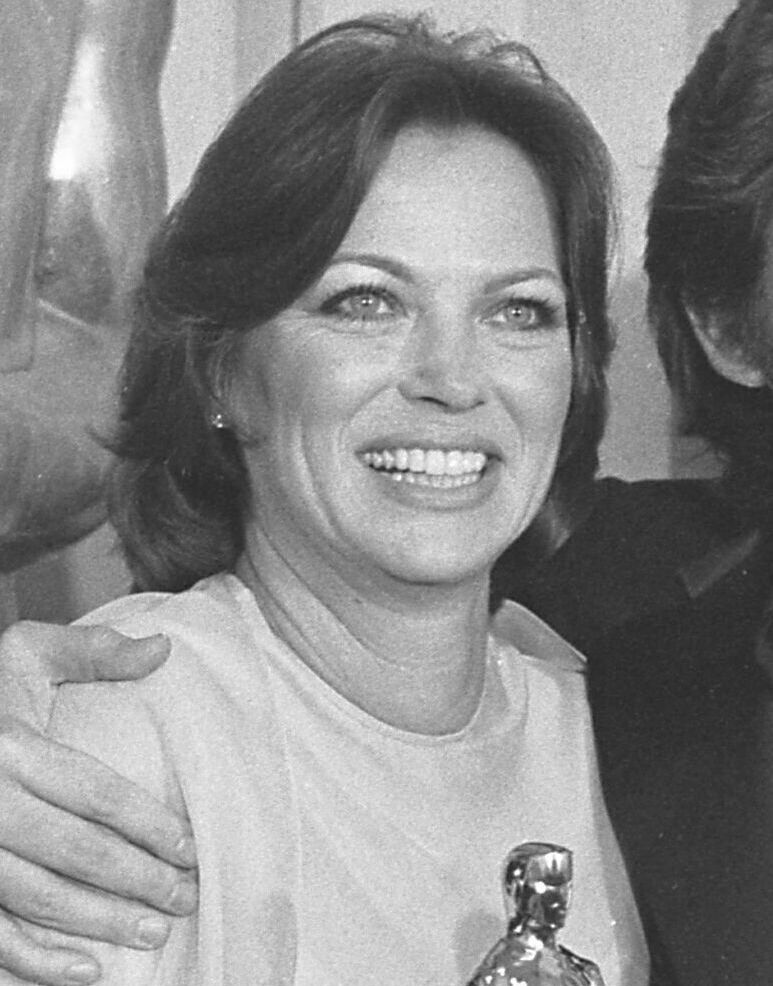
Louise Fletcher

- July 1
  - Jamie Farr, American actor (M*A*S*H)
  - Sydney Pollack, American film director, and actor (d. 2008)
- July 6 – LaFarr Stuart, American computer music pioneer, computer engineer
- July 8
  - Rodney Stark, American sociologist (d. 2022)
  - Edward D. DiPrete, American politician (d. 2025)
- July 9 – Michael Graves, American architect (d. 2015)
- July 10
  - Jerry Nelson, American puppeteer with The Muppets (Sesame Street, Fraggle Rock) (d. 2012)
  - Barry Sussman, American editor and author (d. 2022)
- July 11
  - Jim Ridlon, American football safety
  - Woody Sauldsberry, American basketball player (d. 2007)
  - Dick Treleaven, American politician
- July 12 – Van Cliburn, American pianist (d. 2013)
- July 13 – Phillip Crosby, American actor, singer (d. 2004)
- July 14 – Lee Elder, American professional golfer (d. 2021)
- July 16
  - Bill Gunter, American politician (d. 2024)
  - Katherine D. Ortega, 38th Treasurer of the United States
  - George Perles, American football player and coach (d. 2020)
- July 18 – Joan Evans, actress (d. 2023)
- July 19 – Bobby Bradford, jazz trumpeter, cornetist, bandleader, and composer
- July 21 – Edolphus Towns, politician
- July 22 – Louise Fletcher, actress (One Flew Over the Cuckoo's Nest) (d. 2022)
- July 26 – Kathryn Hays, American actress (d. 2022)
- July 27 – Ajahn Sumedho, Theravada Buddhist representative in the West
- July 28
  - Jacques d'Amboise, ballet dancer (d. 2021)
  - Bud Luckey, voice actor, Pixar animator (d. 2018)
- July 30 – Bud Selig, Major League Baseball commissioner

=== August ===
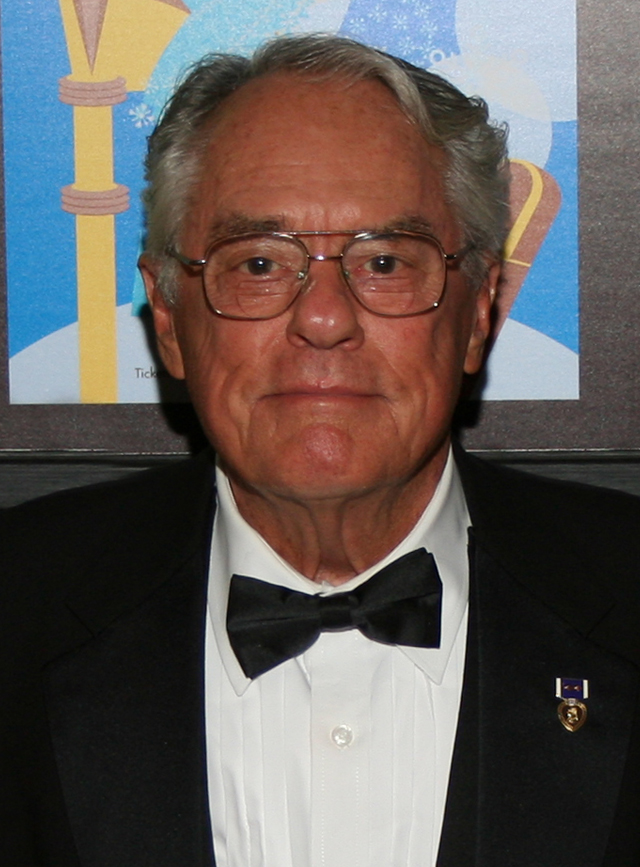
Donnie Dunagan

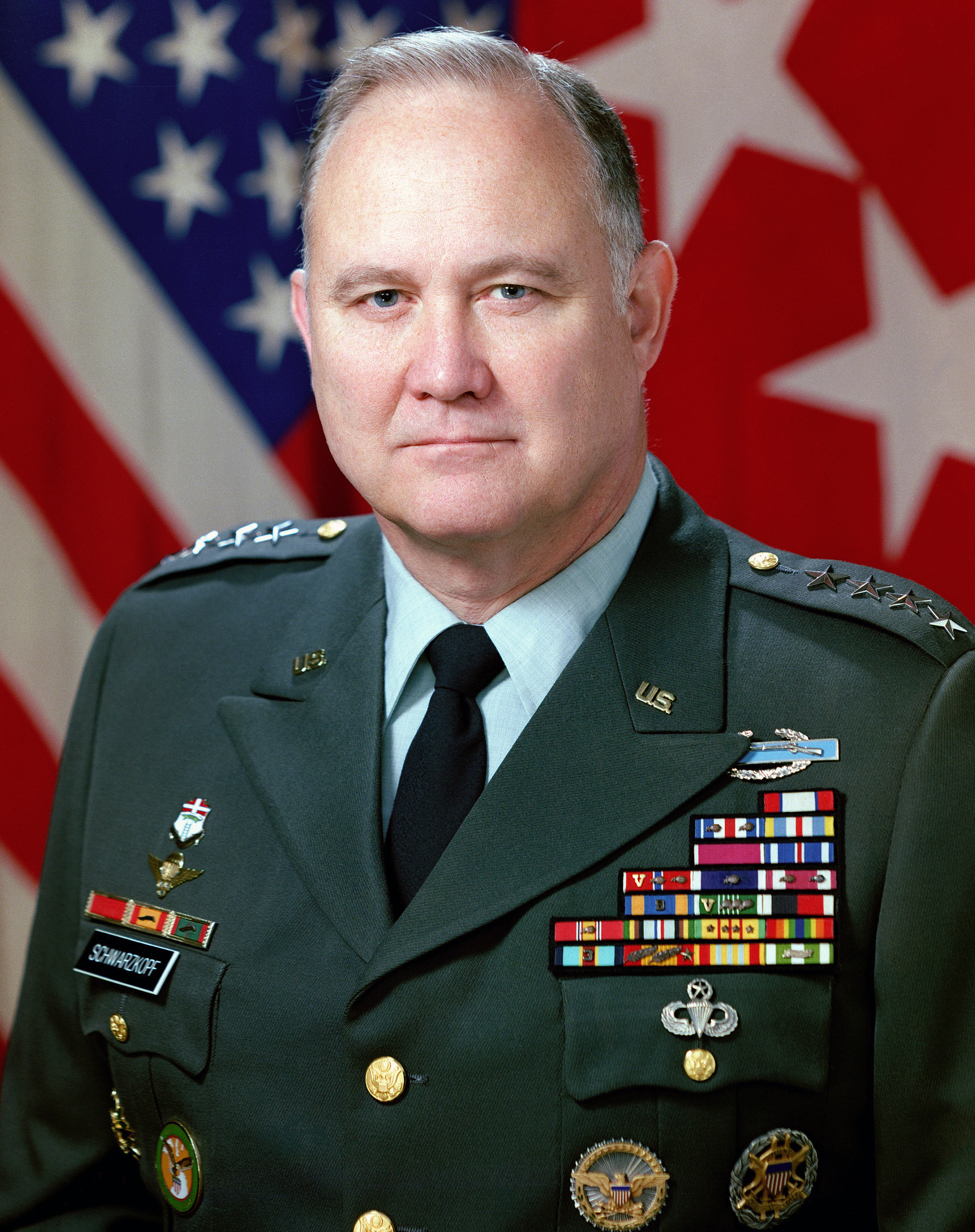
Norman Schwarzkopf

- August 2 – Carl Cain, Olympic basketball player (d. 2024)
- August 3
  - Haystacks Calhoun, professional wrestler (d. 1989)
  - Patrick Gorman, actor
- August 4 – Dallas Green, baseball player, manager, executive (d. 2017)
- August 5
  - Wendell Berry, novelist, essayist, and poet (d. 2026)
  - Vern Gosdin, country music singer (d. 2009)
  - Cammie King, child actor (d. 2010)
- August 6 – Diane di Prima, poet (d. 2020)
- August 9 – Merle Kilgore, country singer/songwriter (d. 2005)
- August 10 – James Tenney, experimental composer (d. 2006)
- August 16
  - Donnie Dunagan, child actor and U.S. Marine Corps major (d. 2026)
  - Ketty Lester, singer and actress
- August 18
  - Vincent Bugliosi, prosecutor, author (d. 2015)
  - Rafer Johnson, decathlete and actor (d. 2020)
- August 19
  - David Durenberger, politician (d. 2023)
  - Renée Richards, transsexual physician, tennis player
- August 22 – Norman Schwarzkopf, Jr., U.S. Army general (d. 2012)
- August 23 – Sonny Jurgensen, American football player (d. 2026)
- August 26 – Tom Heinsohn, basketball player, coach, and broadcaster (d. 2020)
- August 27 – Dave Piontek, basketball player (d. 2004)
- August 29 – David Pryor, politician (d. 2024)
- August 31 – Eusebius J. Beltran, Roman Catholic archbishop (d. 2025)

=== September ===
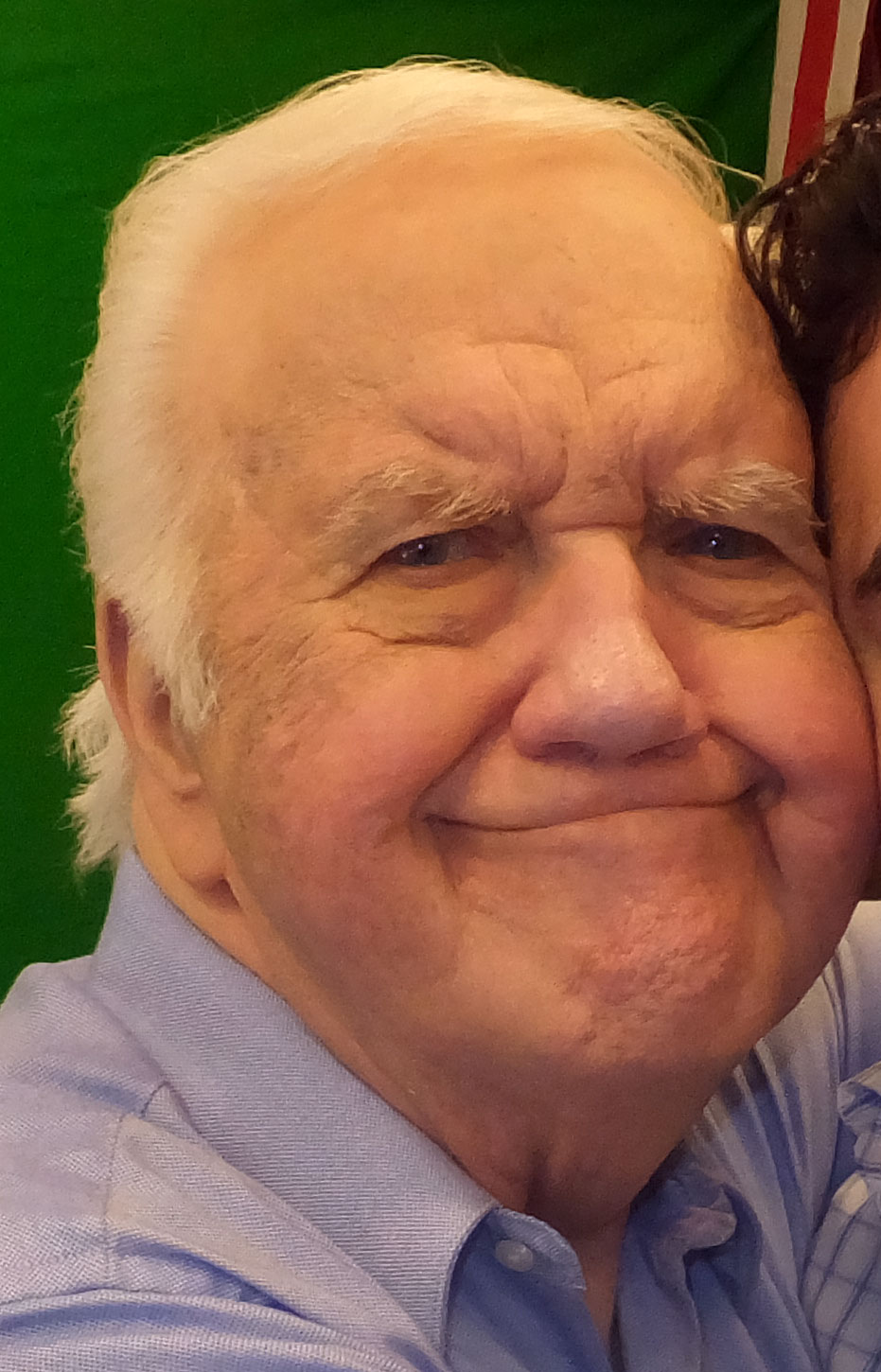
Chuck McCann

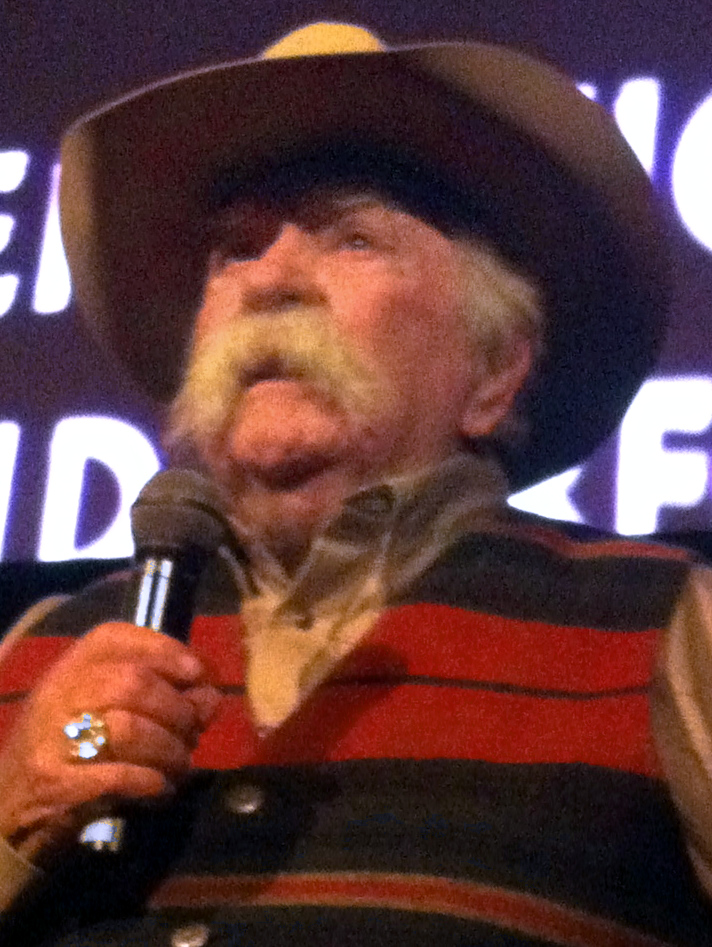
Wilford Brimley

- September 2
  - Chuck McCann, American actor (d. 2018)
  - Grady Nutt, humorist (d. 1982)
- September 4 – Ronald Ludington, figure skating coach and pair skater (d. 2020)
- September 7 – Little Milton, American musician (d. 2005)
- September 10
  - Charles Kuralt, American journalist (CBS Sunday Morning) (d. 1997)
- September 10 – Mr. Wrestling II, American professional wrestler (d. 2020)
- September 12 – Albie Pearson, American baseball player d. 2023)
- September 14 – Kate Millett, American sculptor and feminist activist (d. 2017)
- September 15 - Tomie dePaola, children's author and illustrator (d. 2020)
- September 16 – Elgin Baylor, American basketball player, executive (d. 2021)
- September 17 – Maureen Connolly, American tennis player (d. 1969)
- September 19 – Lloyd Haynes, American actor and television writer (d. 1987)
- September 20
  - Tony Alamo, American religious cult leader, convicted criminal
  - Don Luce, American aid worker and anti-war activist (d. 2022)
  - Jeff Morris, American actor (d. 2004)
- September 21 – Ron Sobieszczyk, American basketball player (d. 2009)
- September 22 – Lute Olson, American basketball coach (d. 2020)
- September 26 – Suzi Gablik, American artist and art critic (d. 2022)
- September 27
  - Beverly Armstrong, American female professional baseball player
  - Wilford Brimley, American actor and singer (d. 2020)

=== October ===
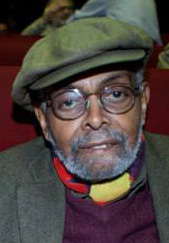
Amiri Baraka

- October 1 – Chuck Hiller, American baseball player (d. 2004)
- October 2 – Earl Wilson, African-American baseball player (d. 2005)
- October 4
  - Sam Huff, American football player (d. 2021)
  - Gwen Margolis, American politician (d. 2020)
- October 6 – Marshall Rosenberg, American psychologist, writer (d. 2015)
- October 7
  - Amiri Baraka, African-American poet, playwright and activist (d. 2014)
  - Willie Naulls, American basketball player (d. 2018)
- October 8 – Billy Brewer, American football player, head coach (d. 2018)
- October 15 – John Coleman, American meteorologist (d. 2018)
- October 16 – Robert M. O'Neil, American educator (d. 2018)
- October 18 – Chuck Swindoll, American evangelist
- October 19 – Benita Valente, American soprano (d. 2025)
- October 20
  - Michael Dunn, a.k.a. Gary Neil Miller, dwarf American actor and singer (d. 1973)
  - Eddie Harris, African-American jazz musician (d. 1996)
  - Charles Liebman, American-born Israeli political scientist and author on Jewish life and Israel (d. 2003 in Israel)
- October 26 – Hot Rod Hundley, American basketball player (d. 2015)

=== November ===
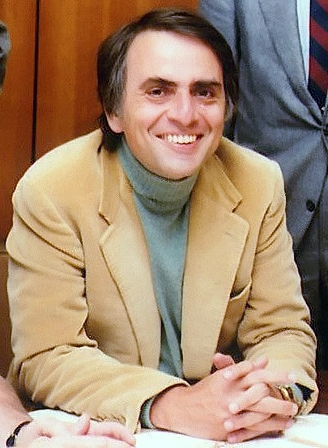
Carl Sagan

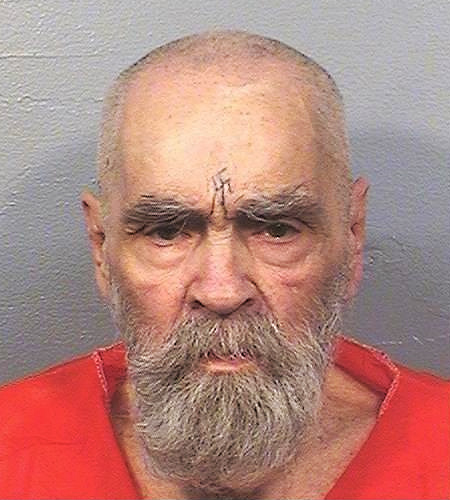
Charles Manson

- November 1 – Howie Goss, American baseball player (d. 1996)
- November 2 – Joseph E. Brennan, American politician, governor of Maine (d. 2024)
- November 3 – Bob Hopkins, American basketball player (d. 2015)
- November 4 – William Q. MacLean Jr., American politician (d. 2026)
- November 5 – Victor Argo, American actor (d. 2004)
- November 6 – Barton Myers, American architect
- November 9 – Carl Sagan, American cosmologist (d. 1996)
- November 10 – Joanna Moore, American actress (d. 1997)
- November 12 – Charles Manson, American cult leader and criminal (d. 2017)
- November 13 – Garry Marshall, American film producer, director and actor (d. 2016)
- November 14 – Ralph J. Lamberti, American politician (d. 2025)
- November 17 – Jim Inhofe, American politician (d. 2024)
- November 18 – Paul Wiggin, American football player and coach (d. 2025)
- November 21 – Laurence Luckinbill, American actor
- November 23
  - Robert Towne, American screenwriter and director (d. 2024)
  - Michael Wayne, American film producer and actor (d. 2003)
- November 27
  - Claude Jarman Jr., American actor (d. 2025)
  - Curtis S. Person Jr., American politician (d. 2020)
  - Gilbert Strang, American mathematician
- November 28 – Margaret Farrow, American politician (d. 2022)
- November 29 – Willie Morris, American writer (d. 1999)
- November 30 – Steve Hamilton, American basketball and baseball player (d. 1997)

=== December ===
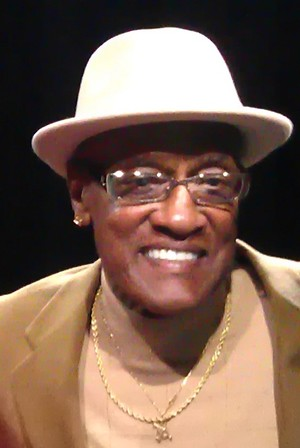
Billy Paul

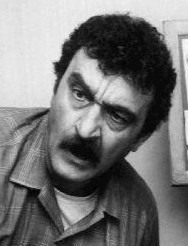
Victor French

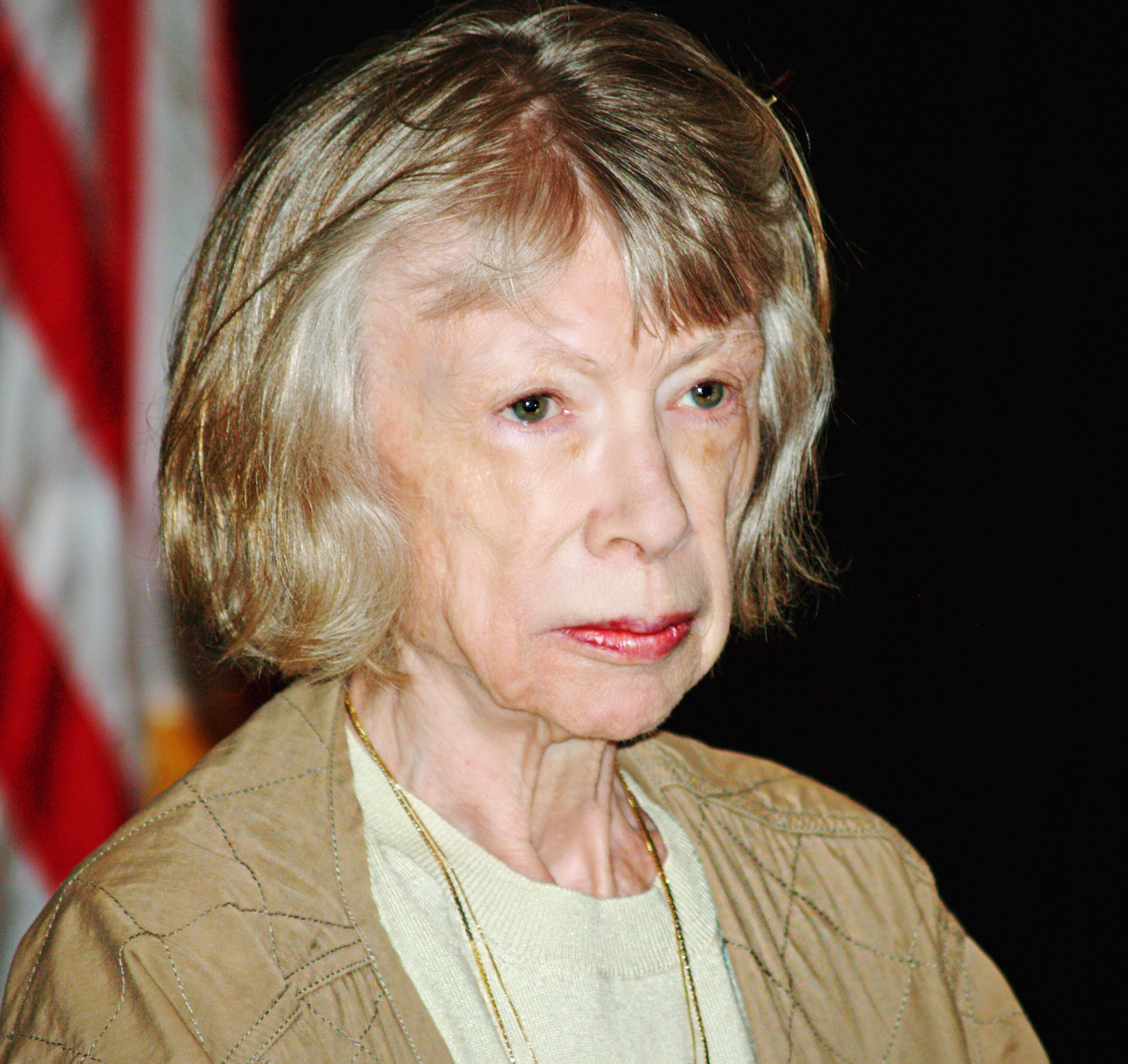
Joan Didion

- December 1 – Billy Paul, African-American singer (d. 2016)
- December 2 – Andre Rodgers, American baseball player (d. 2004)
- December 3 – Eddie Bernice Johnson, African-American politician (d. 2023)
- December 4 – Victor French, American actor, director (d. 1989)
- December 5 – Joan Didion, American novelist (d. 2021)
- December 6 – Nick Bockwinkel, American professional wrestler (d. 2015)
- December 7 – Joey Powers, American singer-songwriter (d. 2017)
- December 9
  - Henry McNamara, politician (d. 2018)
  - Junior Wells, harmonica player (d. 1998)
- December 10 – Howard Martin Temin, geneticist (d. 1994)
- December 13 – Richard D. Zanuck, producer (d. 2012)
- December 16
  - Pete Schrum, American actor (d. 2003)
  - Pete Wade, American guitarist (d. 2024)
- December 19 – Al Kaline, baseball player (d. 2020)
- December 22
  - David E. Harris, airline pilot (d. 2024)
  - David Pearson, American race car driver (d. 2018)
- December 23 – Dan Swartz, basketball player (d. 1997)
- December 25 – Bob Martinez, politician, 40th Governor of Florida
- December 26 – Mari Hulman George, motorsport executive (d. 2018)
- December 29 – Ed Flanders, actor (d. 1995)
- December 30
  - John Norris Bahcall, astrophysicist (d. 2005)
  - Joseph P. Hoar, U.S. Marine commander (d. 2022)
  - Willie Hobbs Moore, African-American engineer (d. 1994)
  - Del Shannon, American singer (d. 1990)
  - Russ Tamblyn, American dancer, singer and actor

== Deaths ==
- February 25
  - Elizabeth Gertrude Britton, botanist (born 1858)
  - John McGraw, baseball manager (born 1873)
- March 21 – Lilyan Tashman, vaudeville, Broadway and film actress (born 1896)
- April 27 – Joe Vila, sportswriter (born 1866)
- May 17 – Cass Gilbert, architect (born 1859)
- May 23
  - Clyde Barrow, outlaw (shot) (born 1909)
  - Bonnie Parker, outlaw (shot) (born 1910)
- May 24 – Brand Whitlock, journalist and politician (born 1869)
- May 31 – Lew Cody, film actor (born 1884)
- June 8 – Dorothy Dell, film actress (automobile accident) (born 1915)
- June 15 – George W. Fuller, sanitation engineer (born 1868)
- June 20 – Andrew Jackson Zilker, philanthropist (born 1858)
- June 21 – Thorne Smith, humorist and fantasy author (heart attack) (born 1892)
- June 24 – Charles S. Thomas, U.S. Senator from Colorado from 1913 to 1921 (born 1849)
- July 15 – Louis F. Gottschalk, composer (born 1869)
- July 18 – Sy Sanborn, sportswriter (born 1866)
- July 21 – Julian Hawthorne, journalist and novelist (born 1846)
- July 22 – John Dillinger, criminal (shot) (born 1903)
- July 26 – Winsor McCay, comic creator and animator (born 1871)
- August 8 – Wilbert Robinson, baseball manager (born 1863)
- August 10 – George W. Hill, film director (born 1895)
- August 13 – Mary Hunter Austin, travel writer (born 1868)
- August 14 – Raymond Hood, architect (born 1881)
- August 30 – Rebecca Richardson Joslin, writer, lecturer, benefactor, clubwoman (born 1846)
- September 2
  - Russ Columbo, singer and actor (shot) (born 1908)
  - Alcide Nunez, jazz clarinetist (born 1884)
- October 6 – James Taliaferro, U.S. Senator from Florida from 1899 to 1911 (born 1847)
- October 20 – Josephine White Bates, Canadian-born American author (born 1862)
- October 22 – Pretty Boy Floyd, bank robber (shot) (born 1904)
- November 10 – Ion Farris, politician, Speaker of the Florida House of Representatives (born 1878)
- November 22 – Harry Steppe, vaudeville performer (born 1888)
- November 27 – Baby Face Nelson, gangster (shot) (born 1908)
- December 10 – Theobald Smith, bacteriologist (born 1859)
- December 26 – Wallace Thurman, African American novelist (TB) (born 1902)
- December 28 – Lowell Sherman, film actor and director (born 1885)
- December 29 – Elnora Monroe Babcock, suffragist (born 1852)
- December 31 – Cornelia Clapp, marine biologist (born 1859)

== See also ==
- List of American films of 1934
- Timeline of United States history (1930–1949)
