= Senator Kane =

Senator Kane may refer to:

- Elias Kane (1794–1835), U.S. Senator from Illinois
- John I. Kane (born 1960), Pennsylvania State Senate
- Rob Kane (1967–2021), Connecticut State Senate
- Tom Kane (politician) (1878–1939), Montana State Senate

== See also ==
- Tim Kaine (born 1958), U.S. Senator from Virginia
