= Governor Holt =

Governor Holt may refer to:

- Elmer Holt (1884–1945), 10th Governor of Montana
- Homer A. Holt (1898–1975), 20th Governor of West Virginia
- Thomas Michael Holt (1831–1896), 47th Governor of North Carolina
