= Con Pederson =

American visual effects artist (1934–2026)

- Born: April 15, 1934; Minnesota, U.S.
- Died: January 2, 2026 (aged 91); Los Angeles, California, U.S.
- Occupation: Visual effects artist
- Notable work: 2001: A Space Odyssey (1968)

Conrad Alan Pederson (April 15, 1934 – January 2, 2026) was an American visual effects artist.

== Life and career ==
Pederson was born in Minnesota on April 15, 1934. After majoring in art and anthropology at UCLA, he began working at Disney, where he met Wernher von Braun.

He is most known for being the special effects supervisor for 2001: A Space Odyssey (1968). He also worked on View from the Top (2003), and Scooby-Doo 2: Monsters Unleashed (2004).

Pederson died in Woodland Hills, Los Angeles, on January 2, 2026, at the age of 91.
