= John Amirante =

American singer (1934–2018)

- Born: May 12, 1934; The Bronx, New York, U.S.
- Died: April 17, 2018 (aged 83); New York City, New York, U.S.
- Years active: c.1979–2018
- Known for: Anthem singer for the New York Rangers

John Amirante (May 12, 1934 – April 17, 2018) was an American singer who was the anthem singer of the New York Rangers at Madison Square Garden from 1980 until his retirement in 2015. He also sang the anthem for the New York Yankees and New York Mets. He was born in The Bronx, New York.

Amirante died on April 17, 2018, at the age of 83.
