= Tom Kane (politician) =

American politician from Montana (1878–1939)

Lieutenant Governor of Montana
- In office March 13, 1933 – 1934
- Governor: Frank Henry Cooney
- Preceded by: Frank Henry Cooney
- Succeeded by: Ernest T. Eaton

Member of the Montana Senate for Corvallis
- In office 1915–1934

Personal details
- Born: August 23, 1878 Kingston, Ontario, Canada
- Died: March 20, 1939 (aged 60) Ravalli County, Montana, U.S.
- Party: Republican
- Children: 4

Tom Kane (August 23, 1878 – March 20, 1939) was a Canadian-born American politician who served in the Montana Senate as a member of the Republican party. He also served as the acting Lieutenant Governor of Montana from 1933 to 1934.

== Early life ==
Tom Kane was born in Kingston, Ontario, Canada, on August 23, 1878, to Matthew Kane and Francis Simpson. He married Grace Idora Laws on June 6, 1909, and had four children.

== Political career ==
Tom Kane was first elected to the Montana Senate in 1915 and ultimately became President Pro Tempore of the Senate from 1929 to 1934. On March 13, 1933, upon the resignation of Governor John Edward Erickson in order to take his newly elected seat as a US Senator for Montana, his Lieutenant Governor Frank Henry Cooney became Governor. This meant that Kane succeeded Cooney as acting Lieutenant Governor that same day. A position which he would fulfill until 1934.

== Later life and death ==
Upon reaching the end of his term in 1934, Tom Kane retired from politics and was succeeded as Lieutenant Governor by fellow republican Ernest T. Eaton. Kane died in Ravalli County, Montana on March 20, 1939. He lies buried at Corvallis Cemetery.

== See also ==
- List of lieutenant governors of Montana
- Montana Senate

Political offices
Preceded by Frank Henry Cooney	Lieutenant Governor of Montana; 1933-1934	Succeeded by Ernest T. Eaton
