= Tricorne =

Hat with the brim turned up on three sides

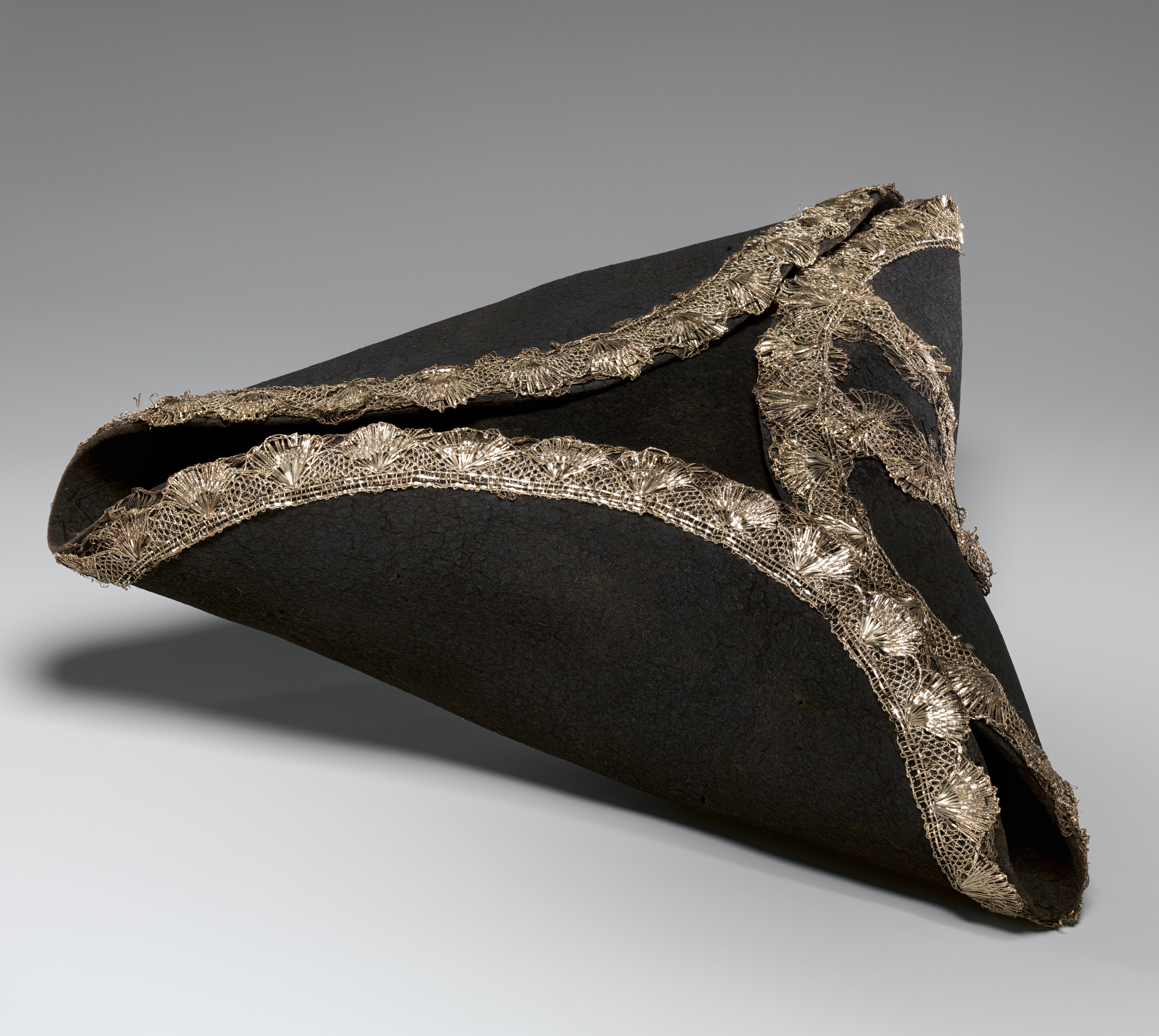
- Italian tricorne hat, mid-18th century
- Type: Hat
- Material: Animal fiber
- Introduced: 17th century

The tricorne or tricorn is a style of hat in a triangular shape, which became popular in Europe during the 18th century, falling out of style by the early 1800s. The word "tricorne" was not widely used until the mid-19th century. During the 18th century, hats of this general style were referred to as "cocked hats".

At the peak of its popularity, the tricorne varied greatly in style and size, and was worn not only by the aristocracy, but also as common civilian dress, and as part of military and naval uniforms. Typically made from animal fiber, the more expensive being of beaver-hair felt and the less expensive of wool felt, the hat's most distinguishing characteristic was that three sides of the brim were turned up (cocked) and either pinned, laced, or buttoned in place to form a triangle around the crown. The style served two purposes: first, it allowed stylish gentlemen to show off the most current fashions of their wigs, and thus their social status; and secondly, the cocked hat, with its folded brim, was much smaller than other hats, and therefore could be more easily tucked under an arm when going inside a building, where social etiquette dictates that a gentleman should remove his hat. Tricornes with laced sides could have the laces loosened and the sides dropped down to provide better protection from the weather, sun, and rain.

Tricornes had a rather broad brim, pinned up on either side of the head and at the back, producing a triangular shape. The hat was typically worn with one point facing forward, though it was not at all unusual for soldiers, who would often rest a rifle or musket on their right shoulder, to wear the tricorne pointed to the left to allow better clearance. The crown is low, unlike the steeple hats worn by the Puritans or the top hat of the 19th century.

Tricornes ranged from the very simple and cheap to the extravagant, occasionally incorporating gold or silver lace trimming and feathers. In addition, military and naval versions usually bore a cockade or other national emblem at the front. This style of hat remains in use in several countries to the present day as an item of ceremonial dress.

== History ==
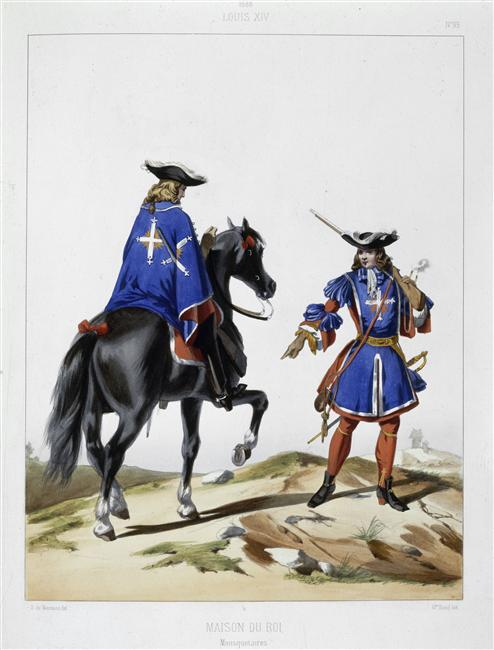
French Musketeers of the Guard wearing tricorne hats in 1688

The tricorne appeared as a result of the evolution of the broad-brim round Cavalier hat used by Spanish soldiers in Flanders during the 17th century. By pledging (binding) the brims, a triangular shape was obtained. This shape was favored by Spanish soldiers, as when standing at arms, their muskets could be held at their shoulders right or left without hitting the hat brim. War broke out between France and Spain in 1667 over the Spanish Netherlands, and during the subsequent struggle, its use spread to the French armies. The style was brought back to France, where its usage spread to the French population and the royal court of King Louis XIV, who made it fashionable throughout Europe. By the end of the 17th century, the tricorne was popular in both civilian fashion and in military uniforms. It remained one of the predominant styles of hat in Europe and European-influenced countries throughout the 18th century, e.g. in the United States the first five presidents, from George Washington to James Monroe, wore this style of hat according to the fashion of the 18th century. James Monroe earned the nickname "The Last Cocked Hat" because of this.

The tricorne quickly declined in use at the end of the 18th century. It evolved into the bicorne, which was widely used by military officers in Europe from the 1790s until World War I, not completely fading out of style until World War II. For enlisted soldiers, the tricorne was replaced by the shako at the turn of the 19th century, which had become the new dominant style of military headgear from 1800 on. Also at the turn of the 19th century, as the fashionable hat for civilian men, the tricorne was overtaken by the top hat. In 1917, the Women's Royal Naval Service introduced a smaller, modernised version of the tricorne for female officers.

== Modern usage and legacy ==
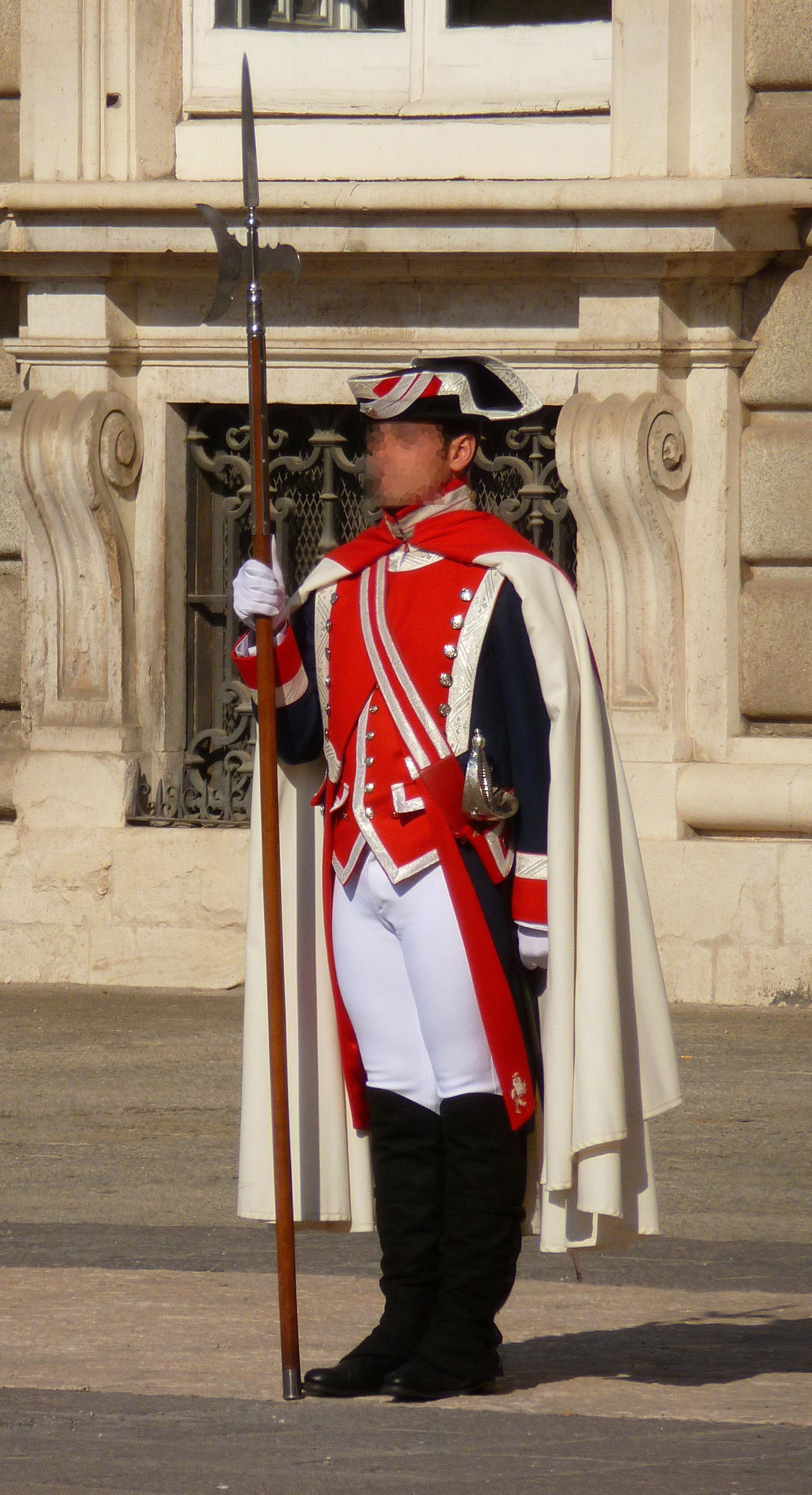
Alabardero (Halberdier) of the Spanish Royal Guard

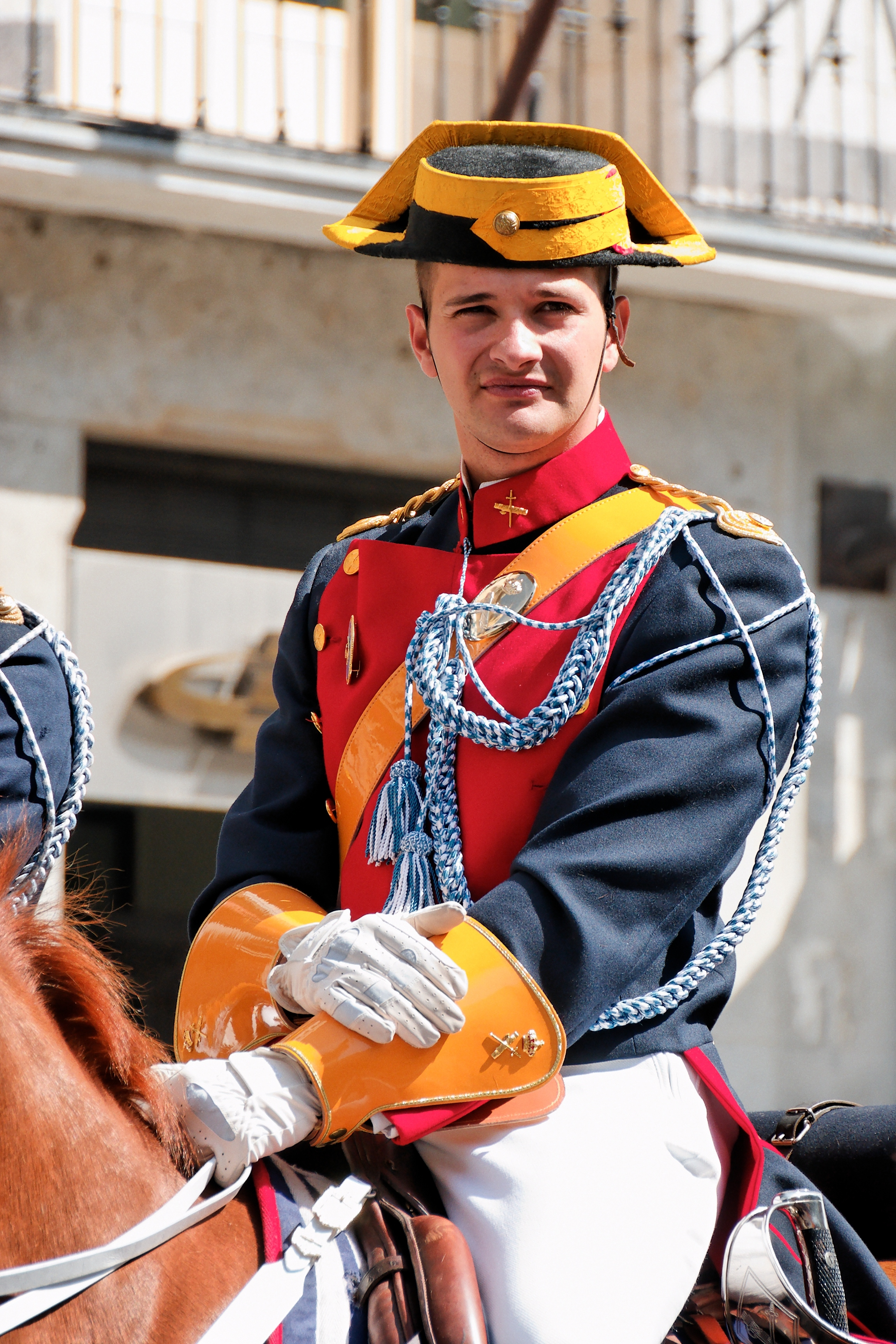
Horse Guard of the Guardia Civil wearing a stylized tricorne during a ceremony in Madrid, Spain

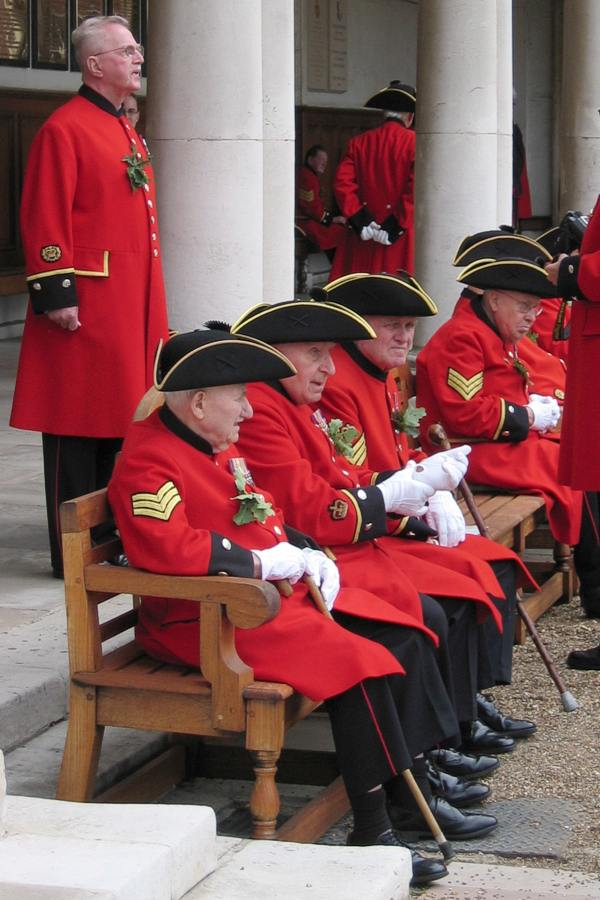
Chelsea Pensioners wearing their tricorne hats

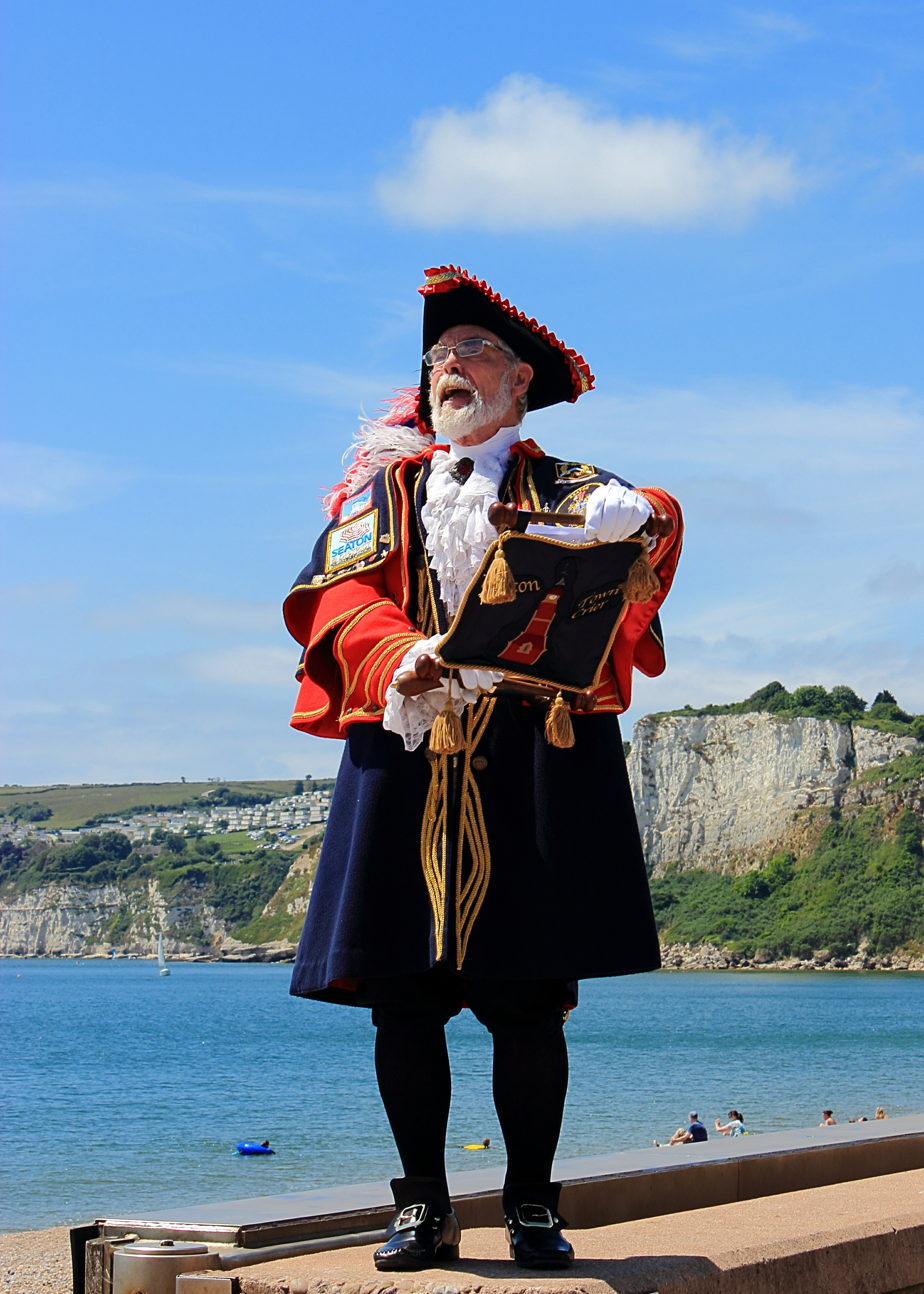
The town crier of Seaton in Devon, 2013

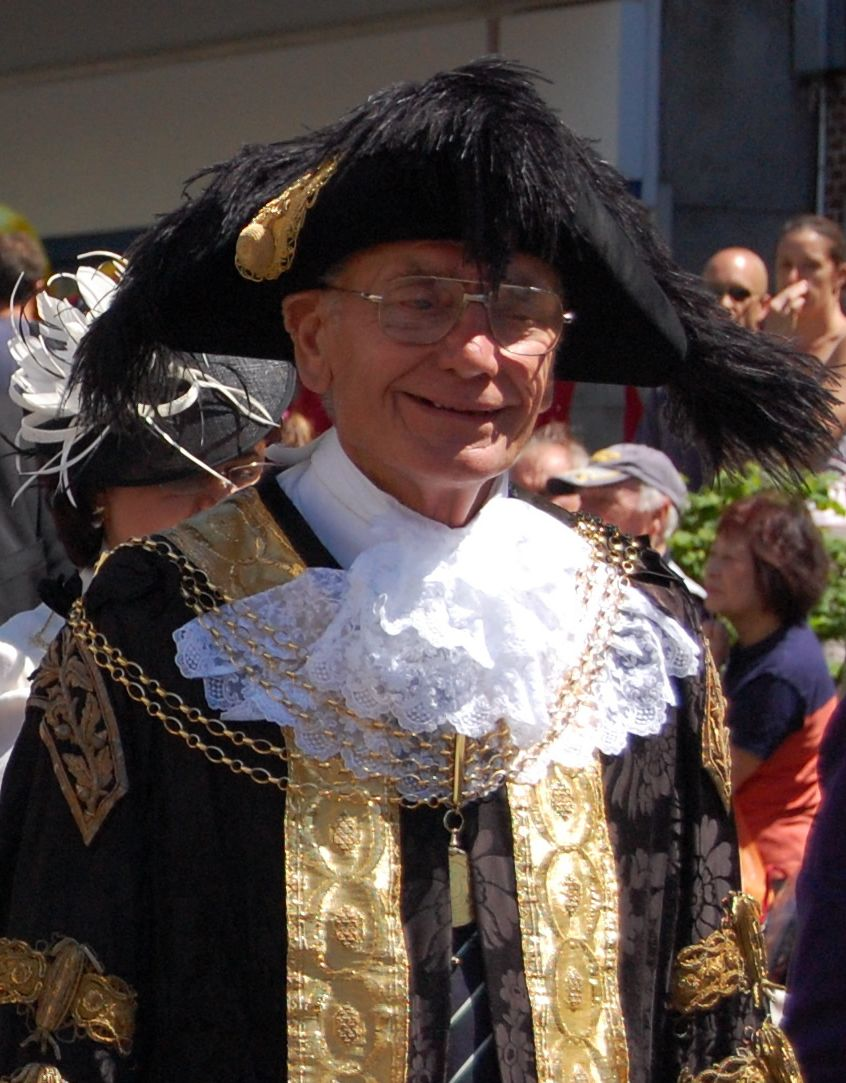
Lord Mayor of Plymouth, 2009

Tricornes survive today as part of the traditional dress of the Chelsea Pensioners (UK) and the Old Guard Fife and Drum Corps of the United States Army, and the distinctive hat of the Spanish Guardia Civil, called a tricornio in Spanish, originates from the tricorne. In the UK, a black feathered tricorne hat is part of the ceremonial dress of most Lord Mayors; at the annual Lord Mayor's Show in November, the newly elected Lord Mayor of the City of London can usually be seen enthusiastically waving his tricorne at the crowds. In the British Parliament until recently, both the Lord Chancellor and the Speaker of the House of Commons used to carry plain black tricornes as part of their formal dress each day when on duty; only on rare occasions was it worn (on top of the full bottomed wig): by the Lord Chancellor when acting as a Lord Commissioner of the Sovereign, and by the Speaker when rebuking a Member at the Bar of the House. During the Introduction Ceremony, new members of the House of Lords were required to doff (remove and replace) a tricorne hat three times before the Lord Chancellor; however, hats were removed from the ritual in 1998.

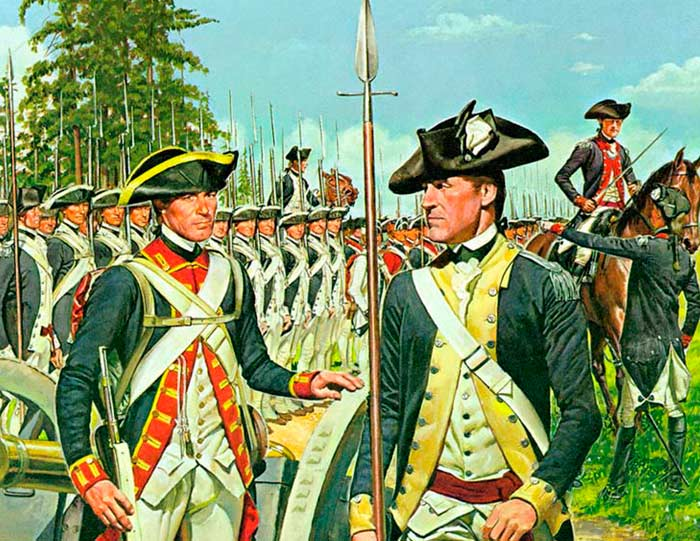
The American Soldier: Set 1, U.S. Center of Military History. Note: The troops in this painting wear the uniforms prescribed in the regulations of 1779 and supplied at the time of the Yorktown campaign -- blue coats with distinctive facings for the infantry regiments from four groups of states: New England; New York and

In the United States, the tricorne is associated with the American Revolution and American Patriots of that era, especially Minutemen (militia members of the American Colonies), as well as the Continental Army who wore black tricorne hats of black felt. Participants in re-enactment events often don tricornes, and they also can be seen in sports culture as worn by fans of teams with Revolutionary names, such as the New England Patriots (an American football team), the New England Revolution (a Major League Soccer team), the United States men's national soccer team, the University of Massachusetts Amherst, and the George Washington University. The Tea Party movement also uses the tricorne as an icon to associate itself with the American Revolution.

In Spain, the traditional headdress of the Guardia Civil, the oldest law enforcement agency covering the whole country, is the tricornio hat, originally a tricorne. Its use now is reserved for parades or ceremonies. The Royal Corps of Halberdiers within the Spanish Royal Guard wear blue and white with a silver ribbon tricorne as part of their formal dress.

In France, synagogue officiants (usually not rabbis) wear the tricorne on formal occasions. In the French Navy and Air Force, tricornes are still worn by women as a piece of uniform.

The tricorne is a key feature in the Portuguese University of Minho's academic dress. Its origins are as far as the 18th century, as being the academic dress of Colégio de Estudos Superiores de S. Paulo, as depicted by tile panels in the Archbishop's Palace of Braga (now Rectorate of the University of Minho). Designated by "Tricórnio" (Portuguese for "tricorne"), this academic dress was redesigned and officially set in 1989.

In Canada, the tricorne is part of the ceremonial wear of the Speakers, both in the federal Parliament and in some provincial legislatures. It is also part of the ceremonial dress for justices of the Supreme Court of Canada.

In 1981, the milliner John Boyd made a famous pink tricorne hat for Diana, Princess of Wales. This style became known as the "Lady Di" design and was copied worldwide.

== Gallery ==
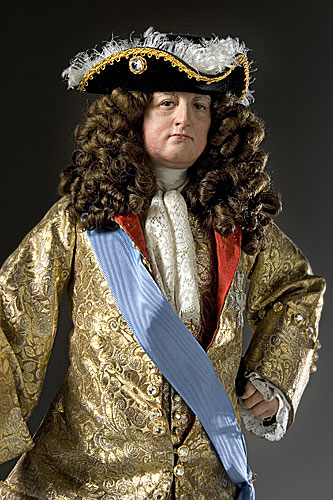
Figure of Louis XIV c. 1685

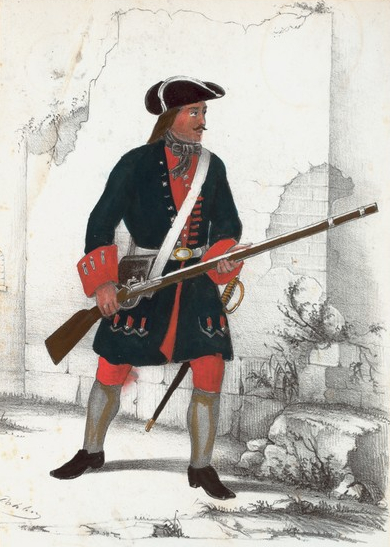
Russian soldier, c. 1700

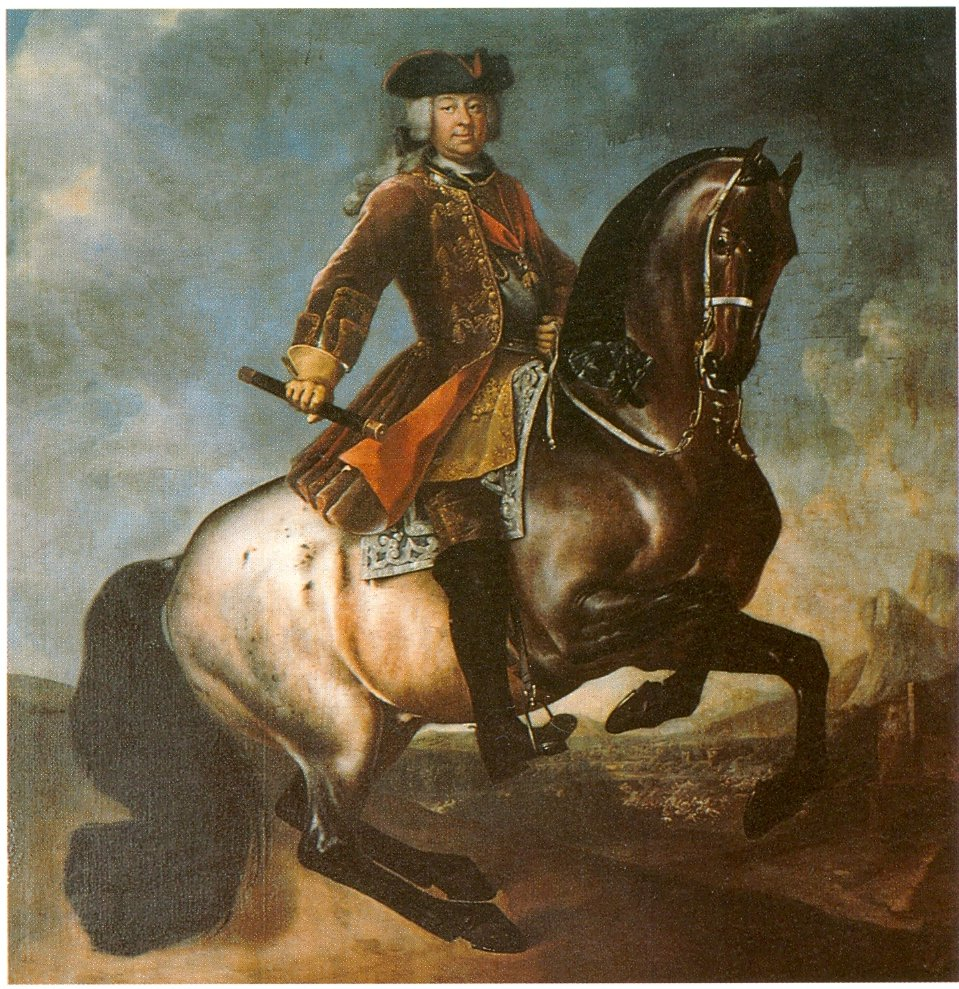
Charles Alexander, c. 1733–1737

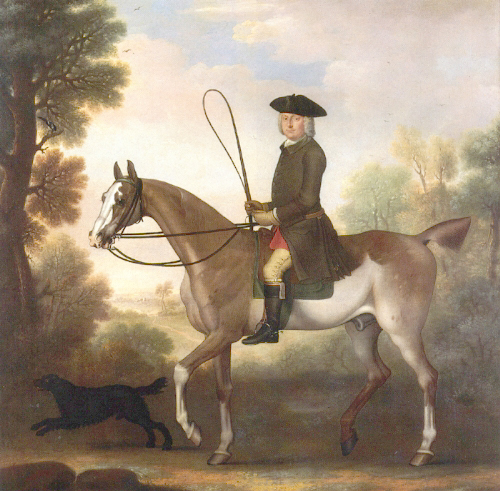
Thomas Gage, 1743

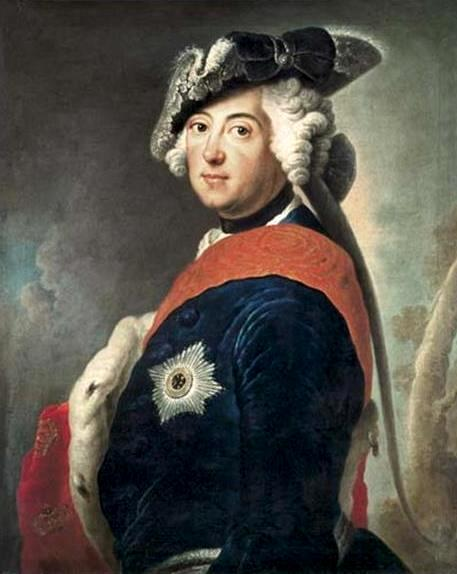
Frederick the Great wearing a tricorne, c. 1750

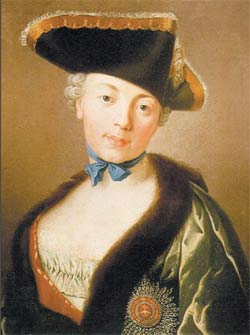
Catherine the Great, c. 1760

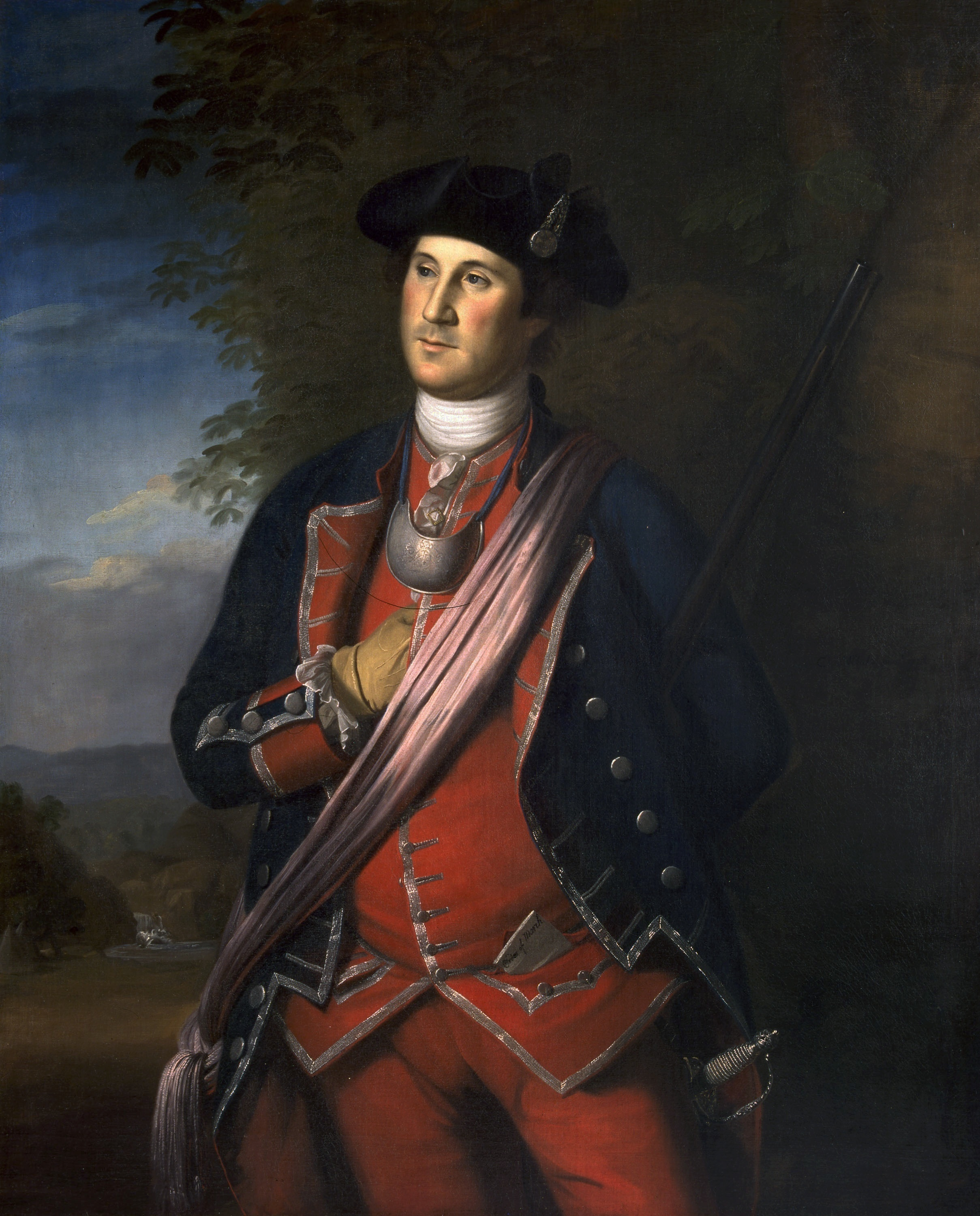
Colonel George Washington, 1772

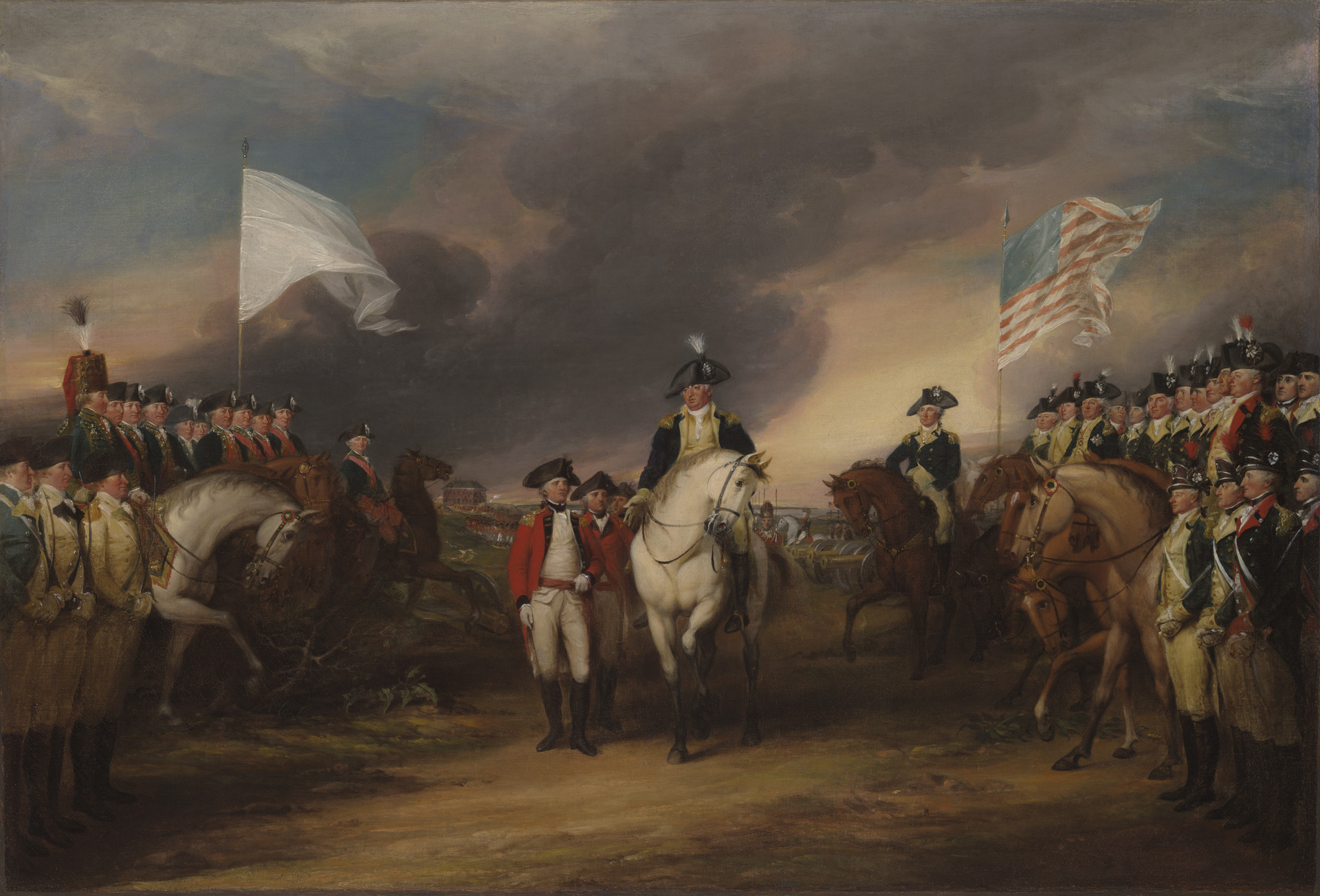
Trumbull's depiction of the 1781 surrender of Lord Cornwallis at Yorktown

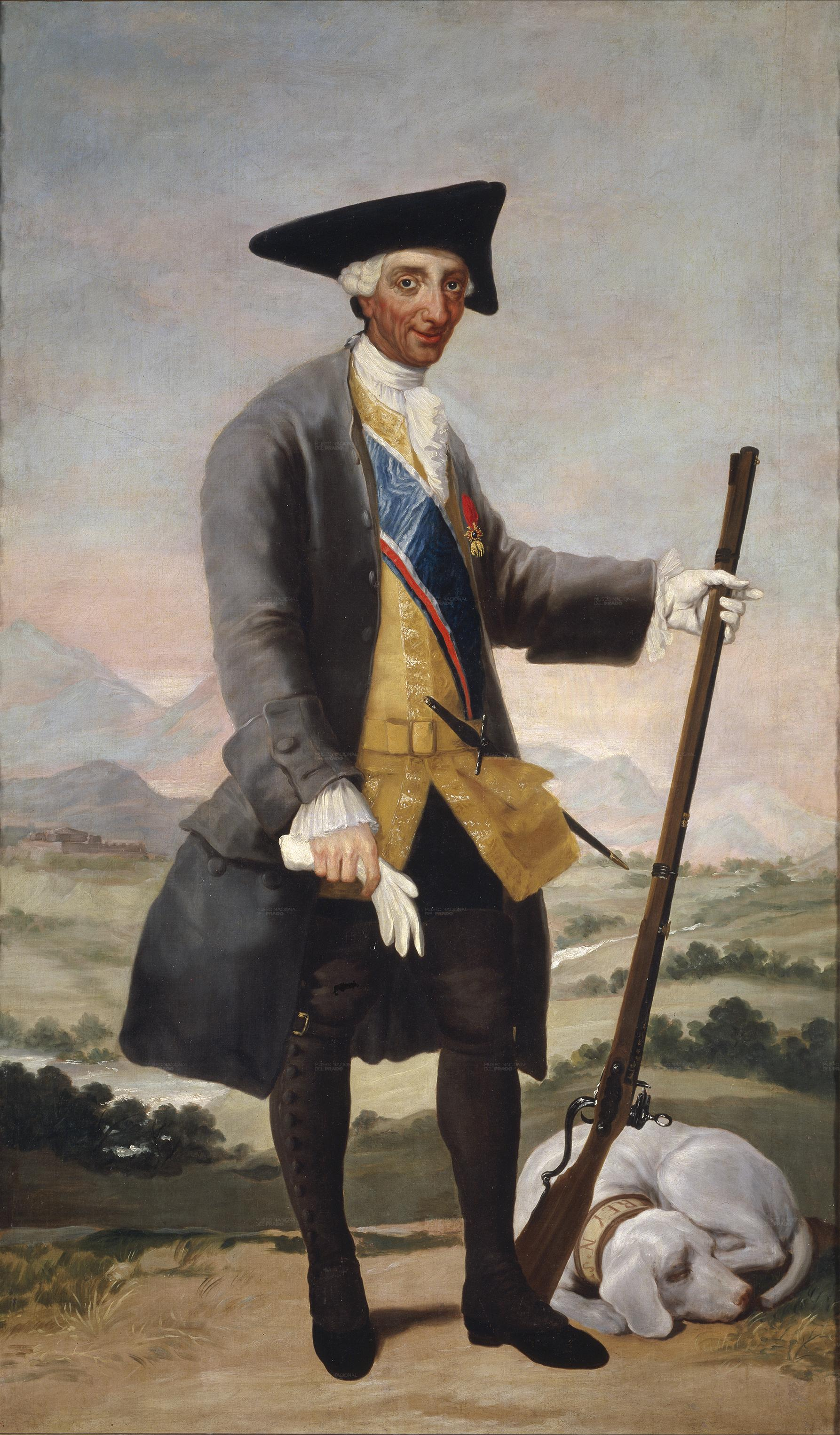
Charles III of Spain, c. 1786–88

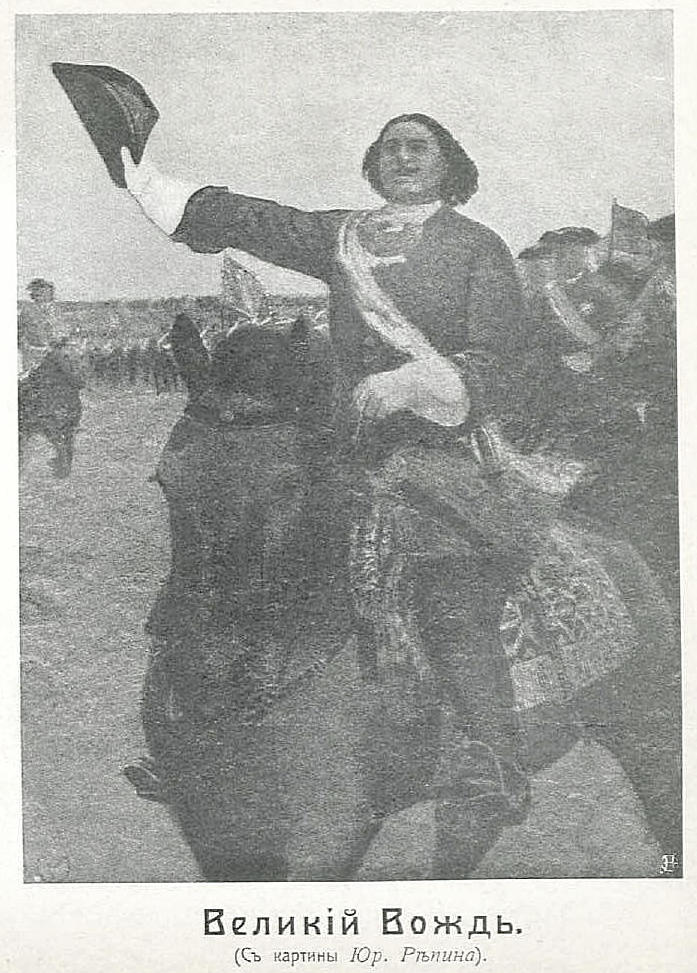
Peter the Great

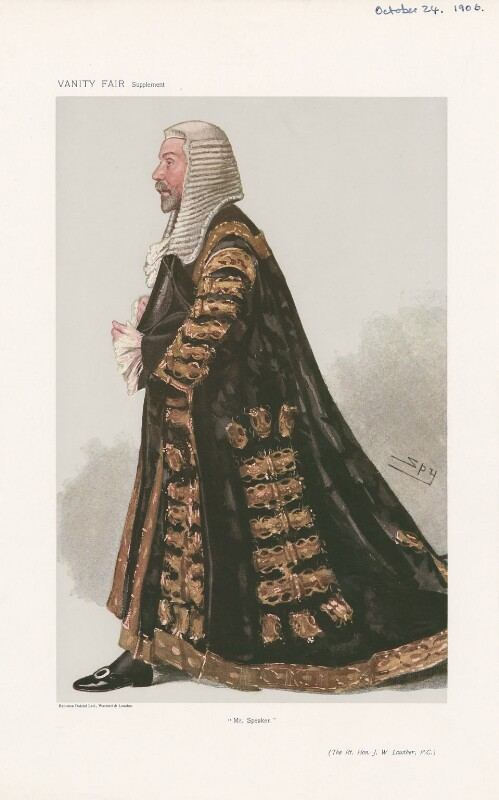
The British Speaker of the House of Commons carrying his tricorne, 1906.

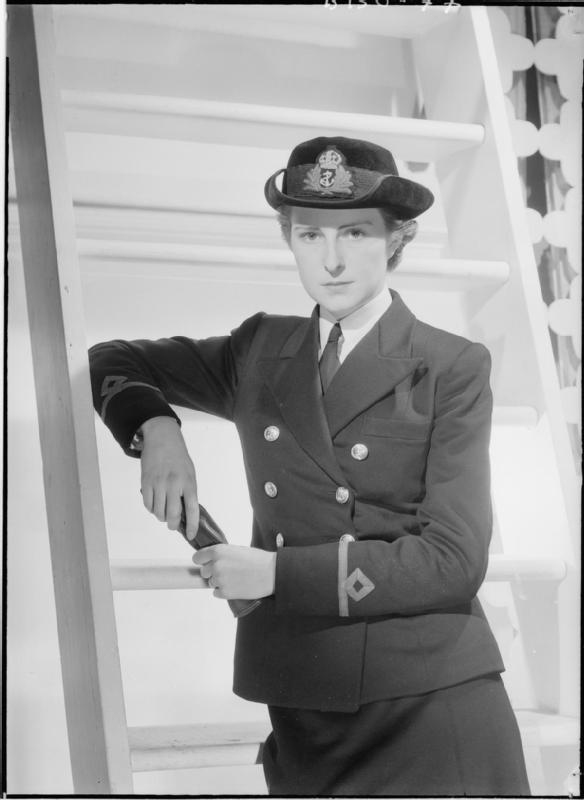
The Women's Royal Naval Service modernised version of the tricorne in 1942.

== See also ==
- Beaver hat
- Bicorne
- Cap
- Chapeau
- List of hat styles
- List of headgear
- Headgear of the United States Army
