= Fanfare trumpet =

Variant of a trumpet

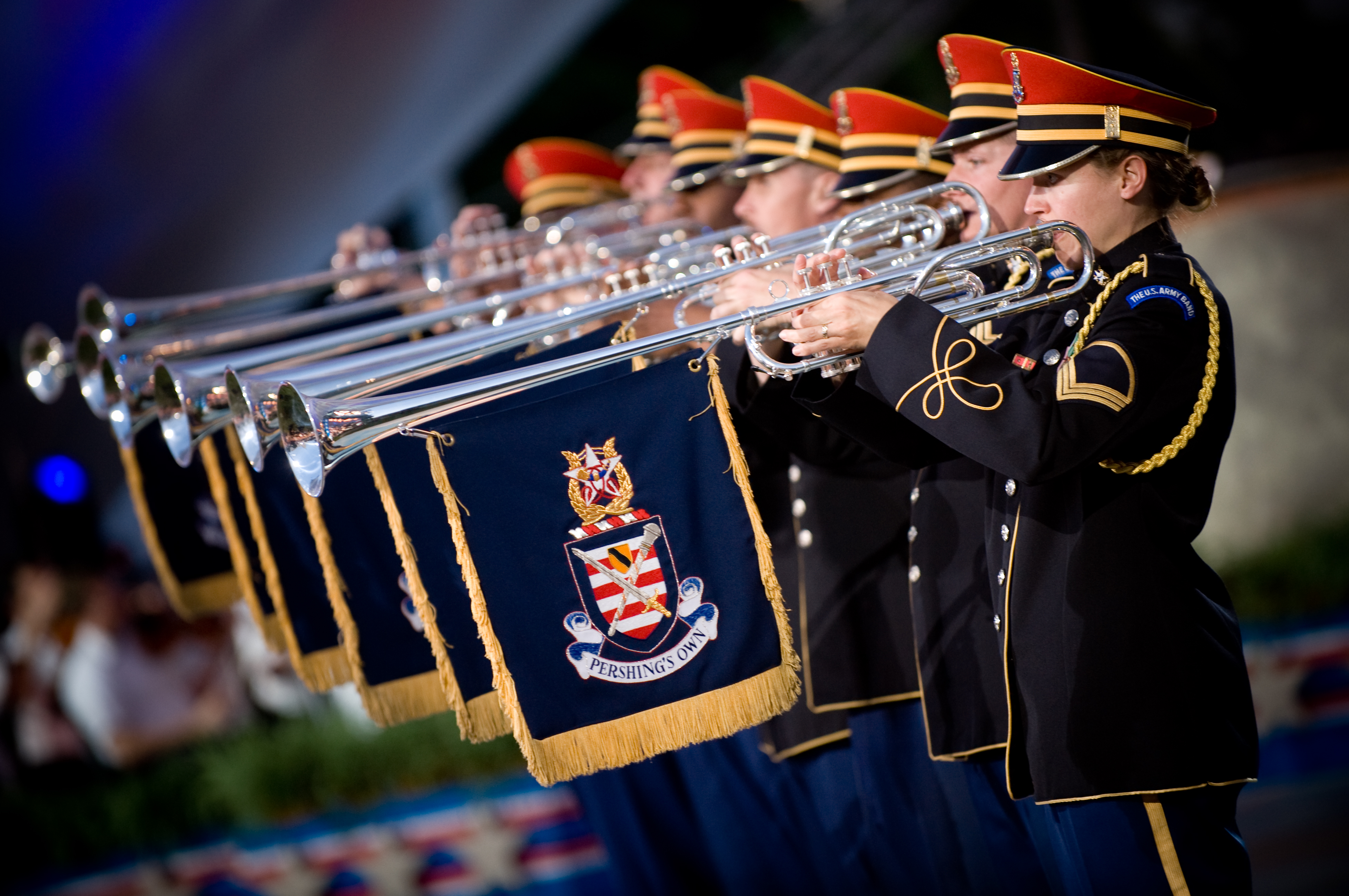
The United States Army Herald Trumpets perform at the 2008 National Memorial Day Concert on the lawn of the U.S. Capitol, Washington D.C., May 25, 2008.

The U.S. Army Herald Trumpets, who use a combination of E-flat, B-flat mezzo-soprano, B-flat tenor, and G bass herald trumpets, playing The Star-Spangled Banner

A fanfare trumpet, also called a herald trumpet, is a brass instrument similar to but longer than a regular trumpet (tubing is the same length as a regular Bb trumpet but not wrapped), capable of playing specially composed fanfares. Its extra length can also accommodate a small ceremonial banner that can be mounted on it.

It differs from its precursor, the medieval buisine, by being coiled rather than straight, and from the clarion trumpet and natural trumpet by possibly having valves.

== Historical background ==
Fanfare trumpet-like instruments existed in ancient Rome (like the Roman tuba), while Iran, Korea and China sport similar traditional instruments (karnay, nafir, nabal and laba in the latter three).

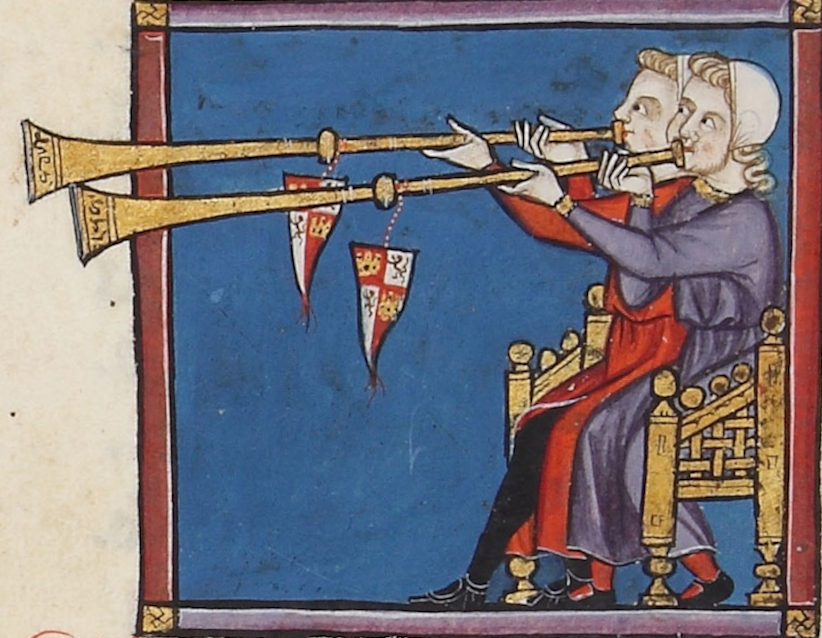
Thirteenth century Spanish depiction of a pair of buisines

Beginning in the late Middle Ages, straight herald trumpets (known as the buisine) and later coiled valve-less natural trumpets, clarions and drums (usually snares and tenors) would sound fanfares to mark important holidays or ceremonial events. These instruments would also serve as timekeepers in various towns and cities and announce various special events. Incorporated into mounted bands since the 12th century, timpani and trumpets or bugles were, from the middle of the 15th century, employed to motivate mounted troops in battle as well as on parades. Many of these early trumpets are direct ancestors to the present day fanfare instruments. The chromatic natural trumpet, used since the 17th century, is the oldest variant type of fanfare trumpet still used today, which was first used in the cavalry branches of European armies and later on as part of the field and horse artillery.

Valved chromatic trumpets, originally developed in the 1930s, are the ones used today by most armed forces and a few police departments worldwide. The instruments used today by most military bands are made since 2000 by British musical instrument maker Smith–Watkins, while a special set has been commissioned in the US for the United States Army Band.

The prakhom band of the Bureau of the Royal Household of Thailand sports such old style trumpets, introduced into the country in the early years of the Bangkok (Rattanakosin) period replacing lost originals. These trumpets are part of the state royal regalia, and are played during important royal events. A similar but plain instrument, the nafiri, is used as part of the regalia of Malaysia because it is an integral part of the nobat or royal orchestra which performs in important royal events in the states of Kedah, Perak, Terrenganu and Selangor and when the King of Malaysia from those states is ceremonially installed.

== Modern types of fanfare trumpets ==
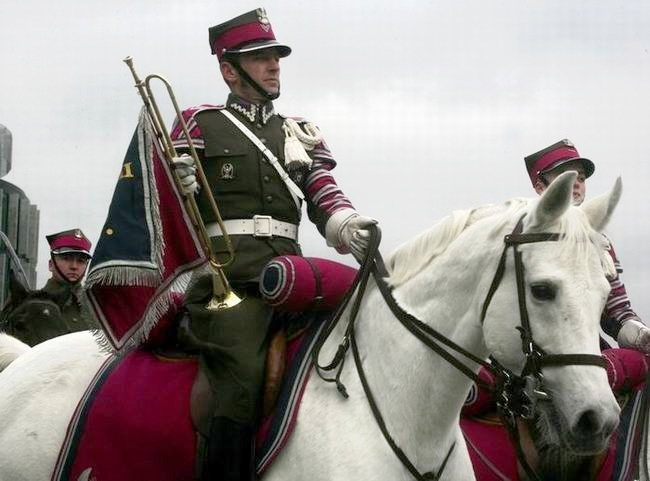
A trumpeter of the Presidential Mounted Ceremonial Cavalry Troop of the Polish Armed Forces.

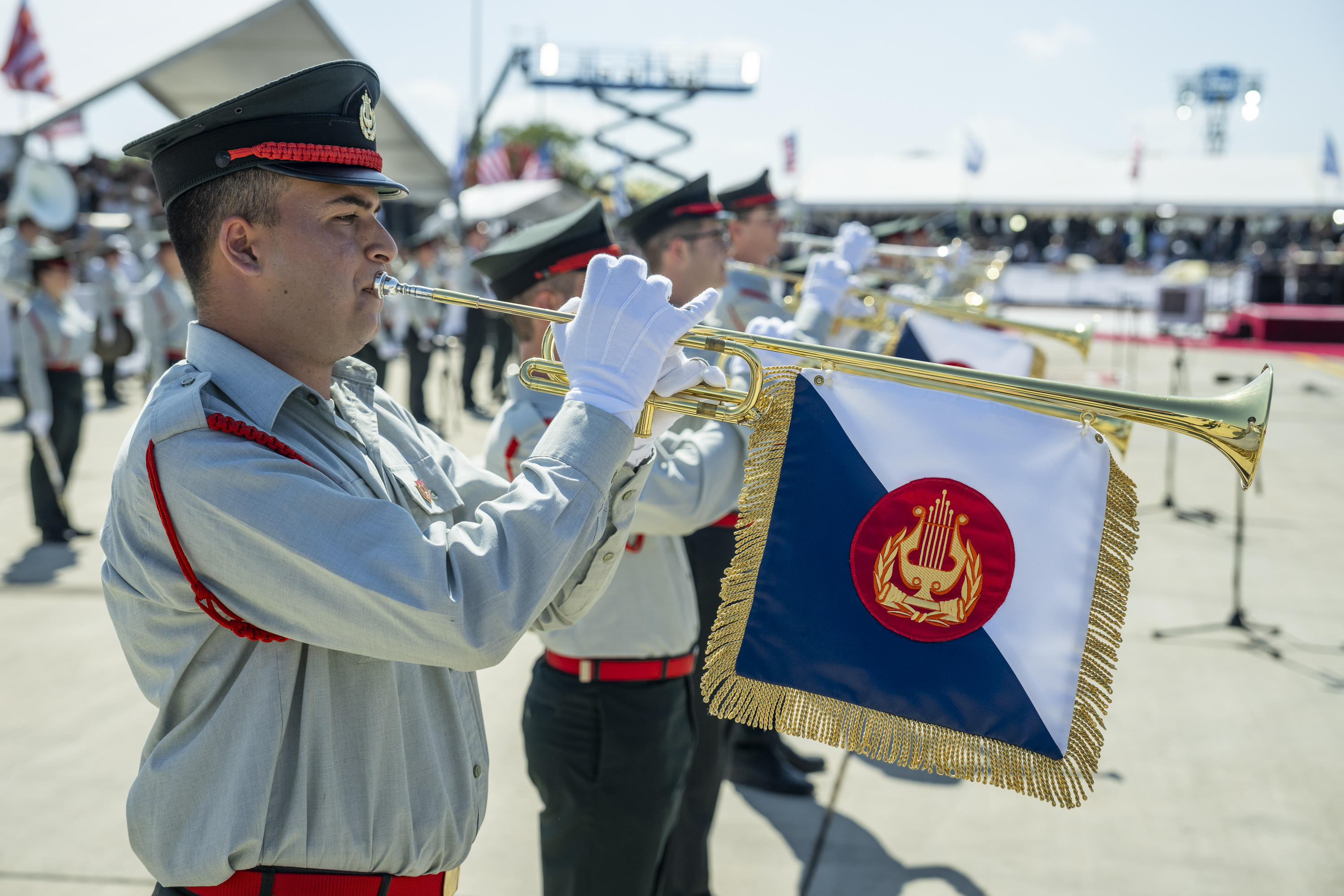
A fanfare trumpet of the IDF Orchestra in July 2022

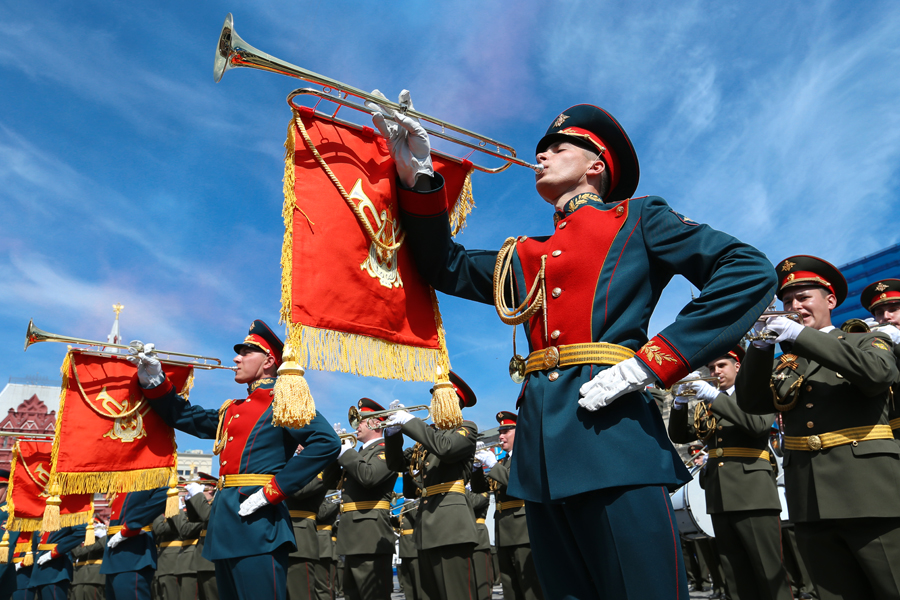
A Russian fanfare trumpet

Modern fanfare trumpets have an elongated bell extending far in front of the player, allowing a standard length of tubing from which a flag or banner may be hung; the instrument is mostly used for ceremonial events such as parades.

Fanfare trumpets today are divided into:

- Natural—modeled after the natural trumpet
  - B♭/F natural (standard, tenor, bass, soprano)
  - E♭/E natural (standard, tenor, bass, soprano)
  - G/F natural (standard, tenor, bass, soprano)
  - B natural (standard, tenor, bass, soprano)
- Valved chromatic herald—invented in 1936 by British firm Hawkes & Son to replace the single valved trumpets used since 1876
  - B♭/F valved herald (standard herald, melody herald, tenor, bass, G bass, soprano)
  - B♭/G valved herald (standard herald, melody herald, tenor, bass, G bass, soprano)
  - E valved herald (standard herald, melody herald, tenor, bass, E/G bass, soprano)

While the valved herald fanfare trumpets are used in most countries the natural chromatic is standard use in the following military forces:

- British King's Troop, Royal Horse Artillery, Household Cavalry, Royal Armoured Corps and Royal Marines Band Service
- French Republican Guard and Armoured Cavalry Arm
- Staff Band of the Bundeswehr and Bonn Band of the Bundeswehr
- Military Band Service of the Armed Forces of Russia and the Special Exemplary Military Band of 3rd Battalion, 154th Preobrazhensky Independent Commandant's Regiment
- Military Band Service of the Armed Forces of the Republic of Belarus
- Presidential Band of the State Security Service of the Republic of Kazakhstan
- Old Guard Fife and Drum Corps, 3rd U.S. Infantry Regiment (The Old Guard)
- Corps of Drums of the Eloy Alfaro Military Academy and Mounted Band of the Tarqui Grenadiers Presidential Horse Guard Squadron, Ecuadorian Army
- Band of the Brigade of the Guards Regimental Centre, Indian Army
- Central Band of the Malaysian Royal Armoured Corps
- Drum and Bugle Corps of the Naval High School, Turkish Navy

The natural chromatic fanfare trumpet is also used by military styled marching bands in France, Germany and the Netherlands.

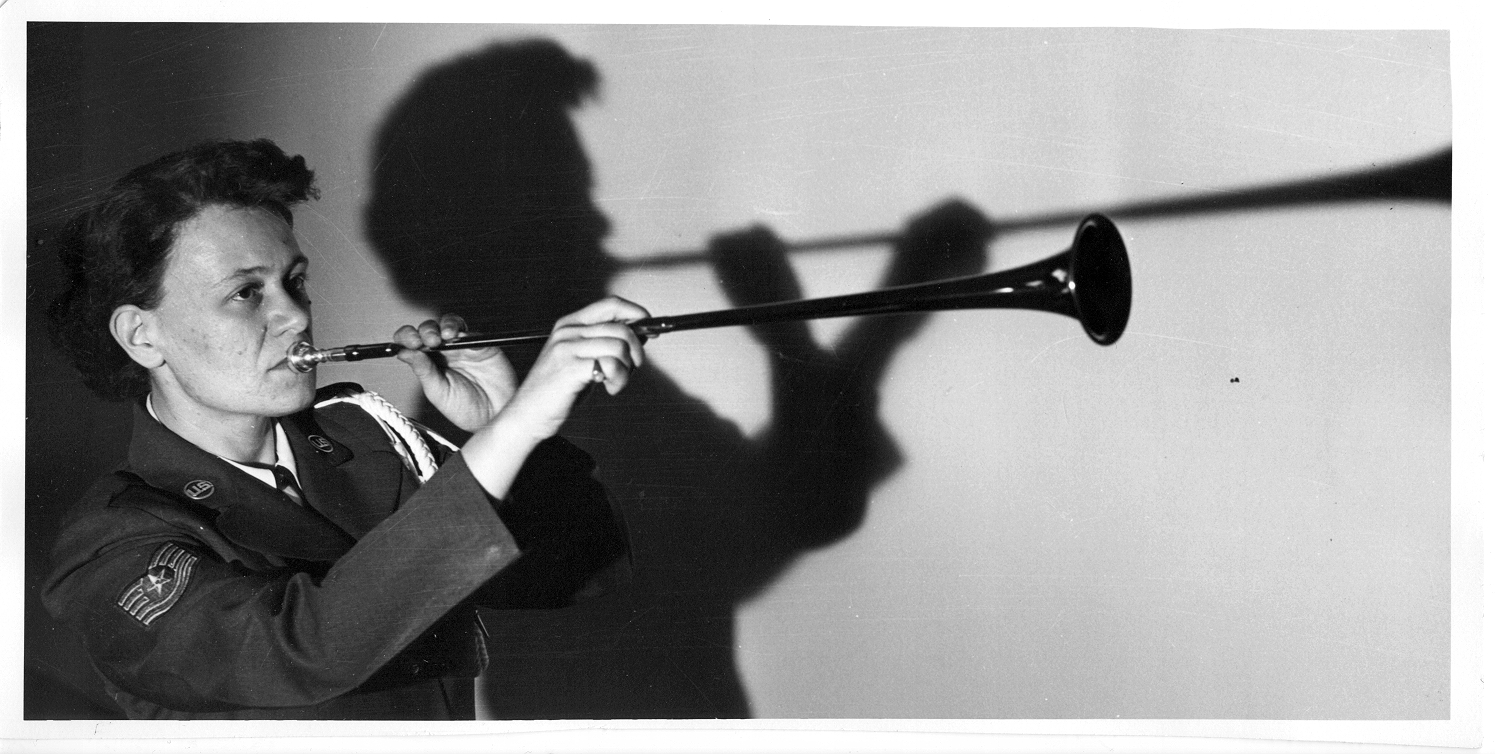
Master Sgt. Martha Jean Awkerman plays a traditional herald trumpet. In addition to its modern fanfare trumpets, the United States military has also used older style of trumpet.

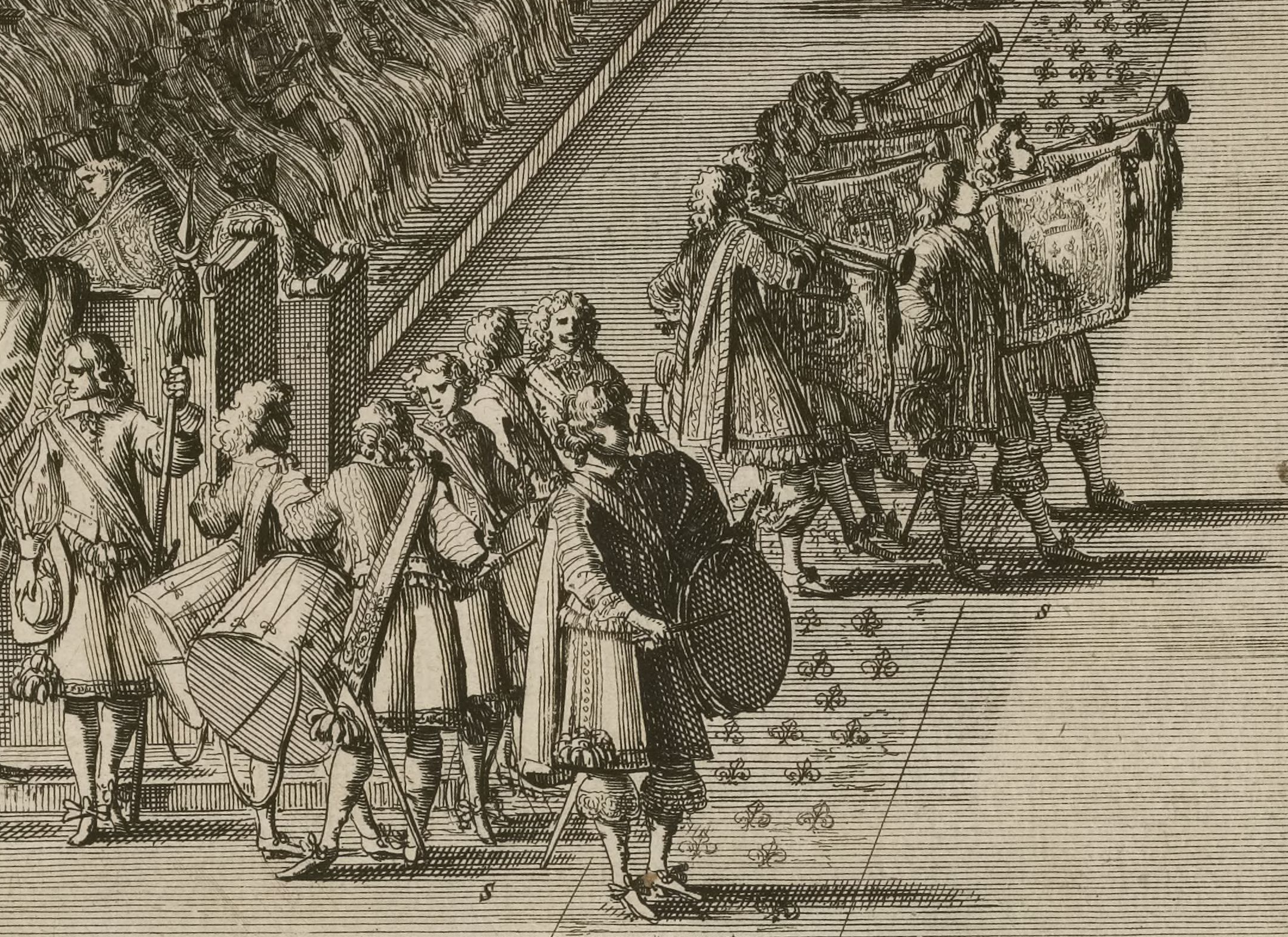
Trumpets at the coronation of King Louis XIV.

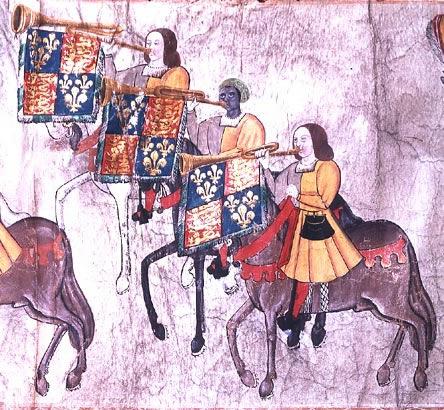
Herald trumpeters for King Henry VIII

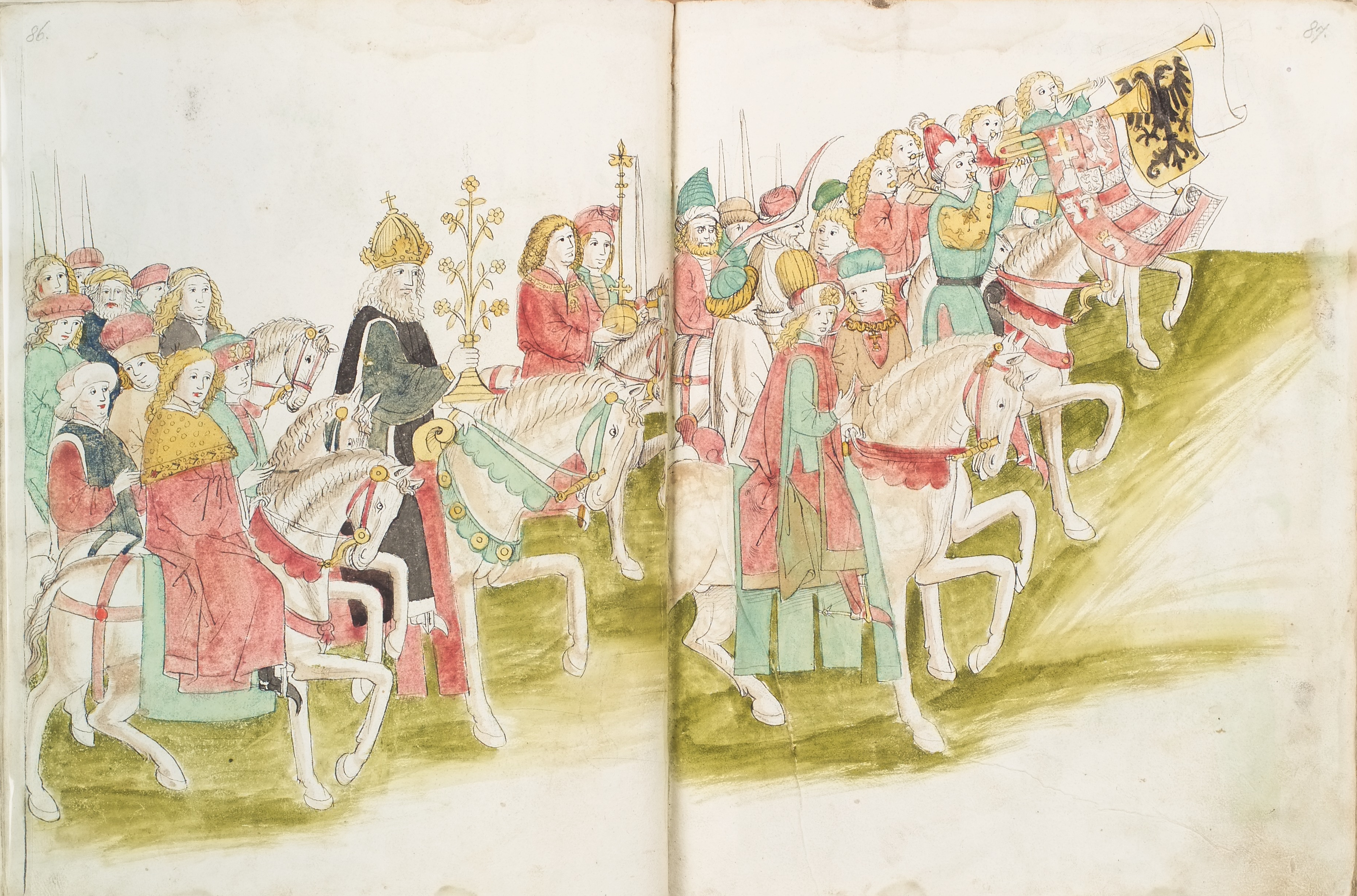
Herald trumpeters play before a procession of the Holy Roman Emperor, Sigismund

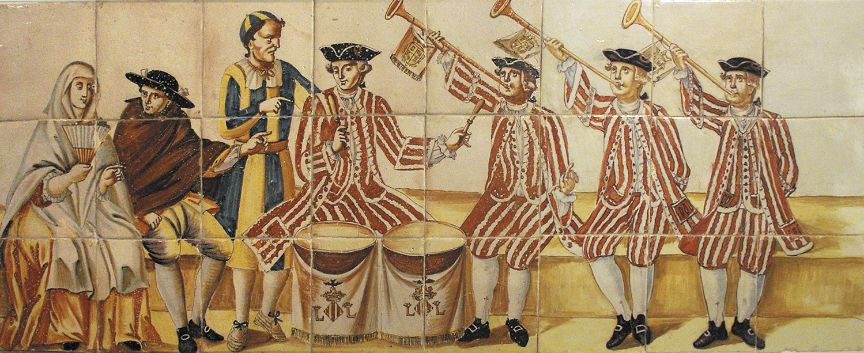
City Trumpets and timpani, with Valencia coat of arms. c. 1750-1800

== See also ==
- United States Army Herald Trumpets
- Drum and bugle corps (classic)
- Military band
- Fanfare band, Corps of drums
- Bugle
