= United States Army Herald Trumpets =

U.S. Army Herald Trumpets
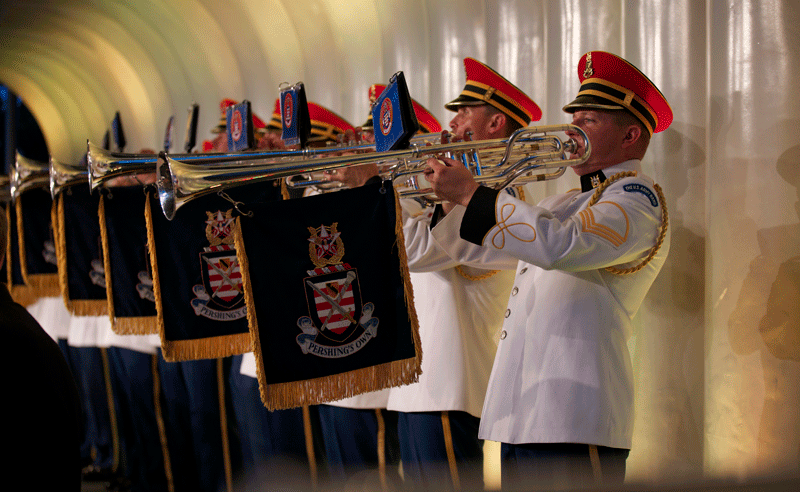
- Active: 1959–present
- Allegiance: United States
- Branch: U.S. Army
- Role: public duties
- Size: 16 personnel
- Garrison/HQ: Joint Base Myer–Henderson Hall

The U.S. Army Herald Trumpets is a musical ensemble of the United States Army chiefly responsible for signaling the approach of the President of the United States at state occasions with entrance and exit fanfares. The unit is also charged with providing general public duties support in the Military District of Washington and beyond.

== History and mission ==
The U.S. Army Herald Trumpets play "Hail to the Chief" as President Barack Obama walks out of the Diplomatic Reception Room.

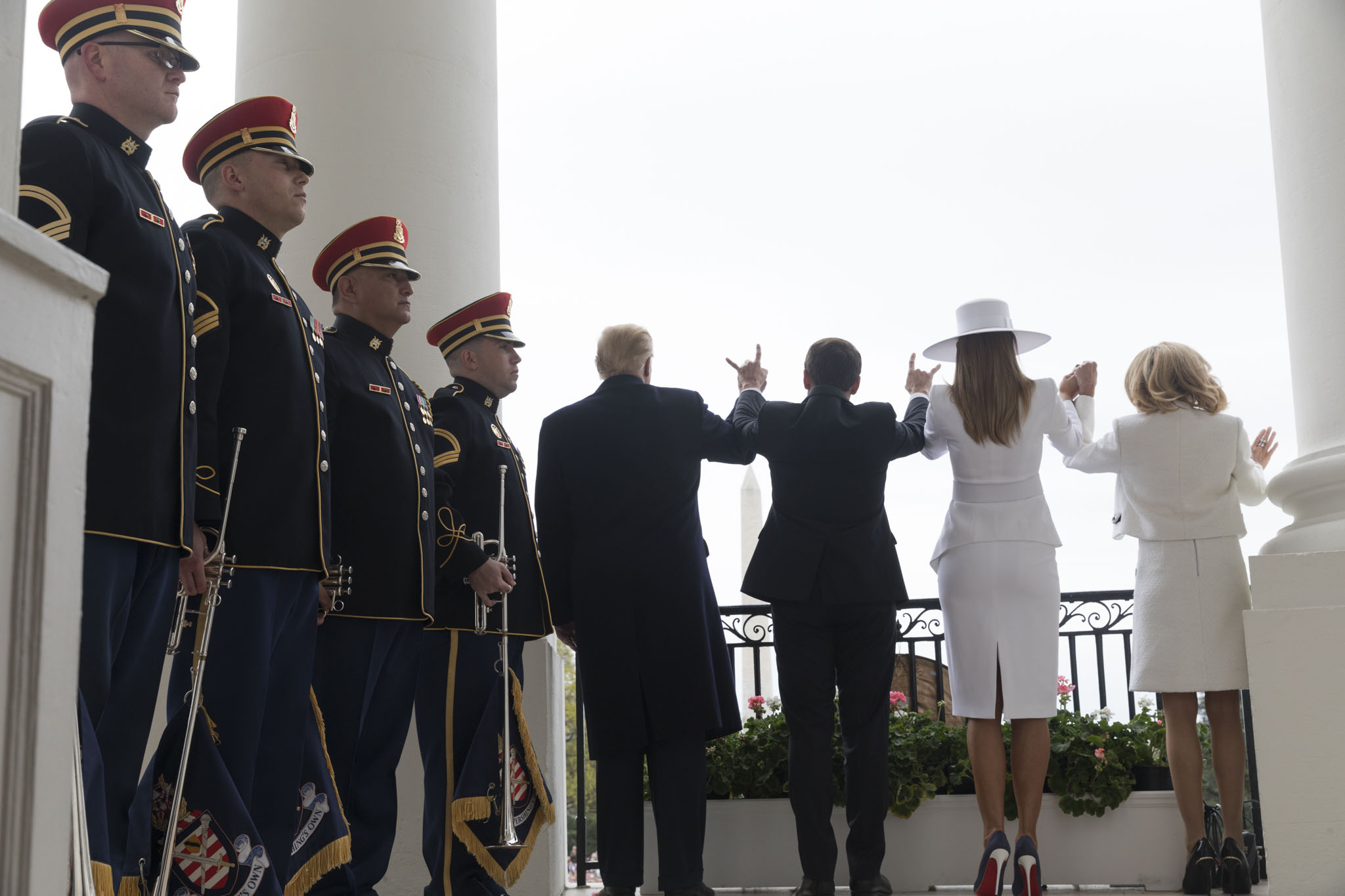

The Army Herald Trumpets is derived from the United States Army Band, founded in 1922. Following successful international tours during World War II, the band split into various sub-groups, including the Herald Trumpets.

U.S. Army Herald Trumpets are designated as the "official fanfare ensemble for the President of the United States" and were activated in 1959 at the suggestion of Army Band cornetists William Bramwell Smith Jr., and Gilbert Mitchell. Its first public performance was for the arrival of President Dwight D. Eisenhower and Queen Elizabeth II at the official opening of the St. Lawrence Seaway and its first White House state arrival ceremony was during the 1960 state visit of Charles de Gaulle. In addition to state occasions, the unit has also performed at other important events, including the opening of Walt Disney World in 1971, the opening of the 1982 World's Fair in Knoxville, Tennessee, and the opening ceremonies of the 1980 Winter Olympic Games at Lake Placid, New York, the 1984 Summer Olympic Games at Los Angeles, California, the 1996 Summer Olympic Games at Atlanta, Georgia, the 2002 Winter Olympic Games in Salt Lake City, Utah, and Games 3 and 4 the 2018 Stanley Cup Final.

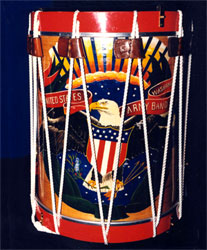
The image on the unit's drums is known as "the Grand Republic" and was designed by Gus Moeller.

The unit is most widely seen at state and official arrival ceremonies at the White House where it performs three times in the order of events: first, "Ruffles and Flourishes" and "Hail to the Chief" for the arrival of the President of the United States; second, "Call to Statesmanship" for the arrival of the visiting head of state or chief of government; third, "Presidential Processional" as the President of the United States returns to the White House. (The respective national anthems, and other music during the ceremony, are performed by one of the premier ensembles.)

U.S. Army Herald Trumpets playing The Star-Spangled Banner

The unit is operationally part of the U.S. Army Band. It is not the only fanfare unit in the United States military. The U.S. Army Training and Doctrine Command also fields a 15-man herald trumpet unit posted at Fort Eustis near Newport News, Virginia, while the Old Guard Fife and Drum Corps of the 3rd United States Infantry Regiment has a five-man fanfare unit that performs on baroque trumpets.

== Uniform and equipment ==
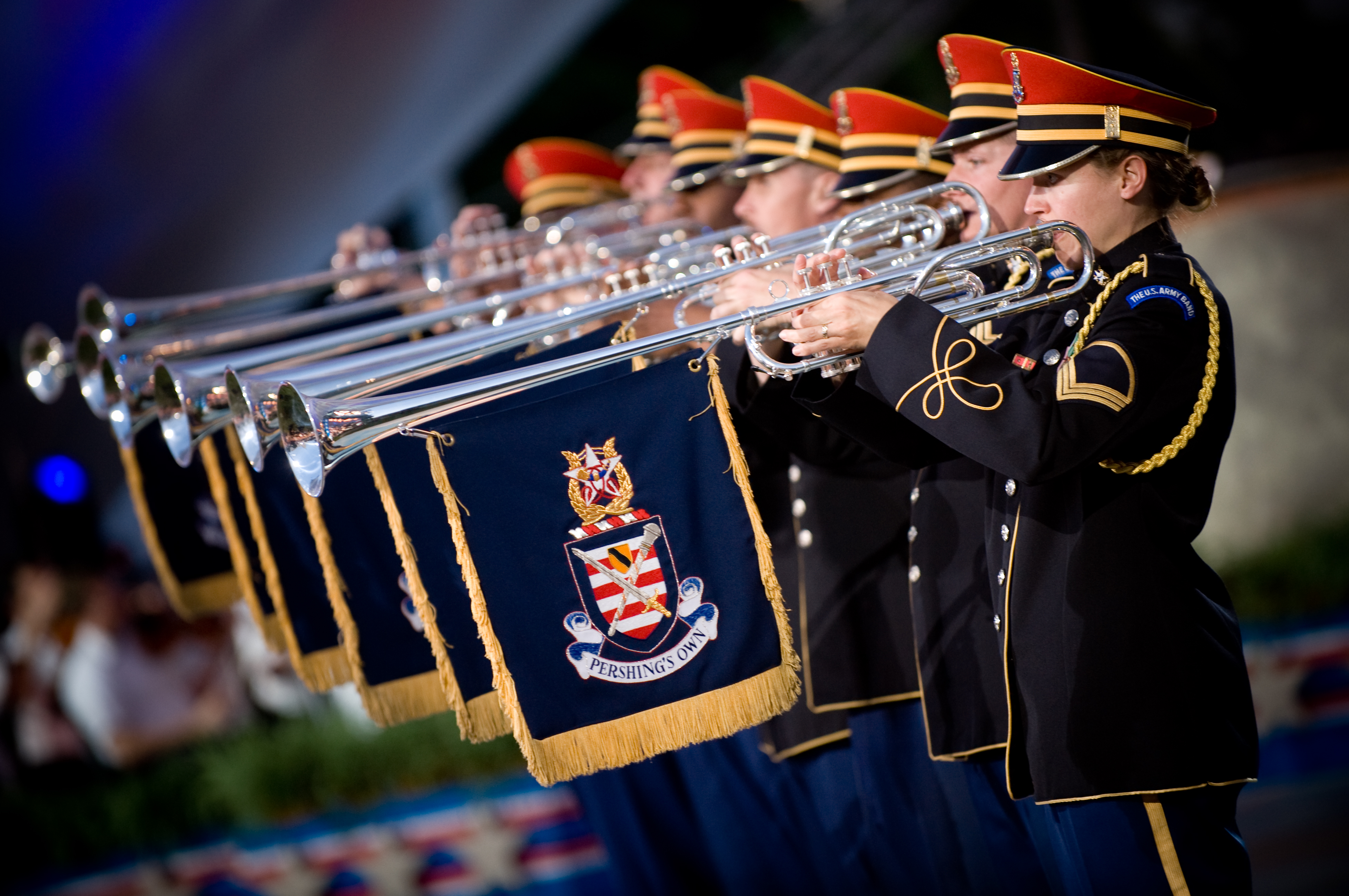
The U.S. Army Herald Trumpets perform at the 2008 National Memorial Day Concert on the lawn of the U.S. Capitol, Washington D.C., May 25, 2008.

The Herald Trumpets use a combination of E-flat, B-flat mezzo-soprano, B-flat tenor, and bass herald trumpets custom-manufactured by Kanstul Musical Instruments. For defined ceremonies herald trumpets decorated by banner with coat of arms. Each trumpet is dressed with a ceremonial tabard emblazoned with the heraldic achievement of the U.S. Army Band. The unit's rope drums, as with those of the rest of the U.S. Army Band, are manufactured by the Cooperman Drum Company and are painted with an emblem known as "the Grand Republic," which was designed by Gus Moeller. The drum heads are made of kevlar.

Posted at Joint Base Myer–Henderson Hall, the Herald Trumpets are a "Special Ceremonial Unit," a U.S. Army designation for units that are authorized to wear uniforms other than the Army Service Uniform when executing public duties. The unit's winter ceremonial uniform consists of a blue blouse with choker collar. A warm-weather uniform substitutes a white blouse, while the cover is a red peaked hat that represents the red coats U.S. Army musicians historically wore on the field of battle to distinguish them from non-musicians.

== See also ==
- Commander-in-Chief's Guard (3rd Infantry Regiment)
- Old Guard Fife and Drum Corps
