= List of United States military premier ensembles =

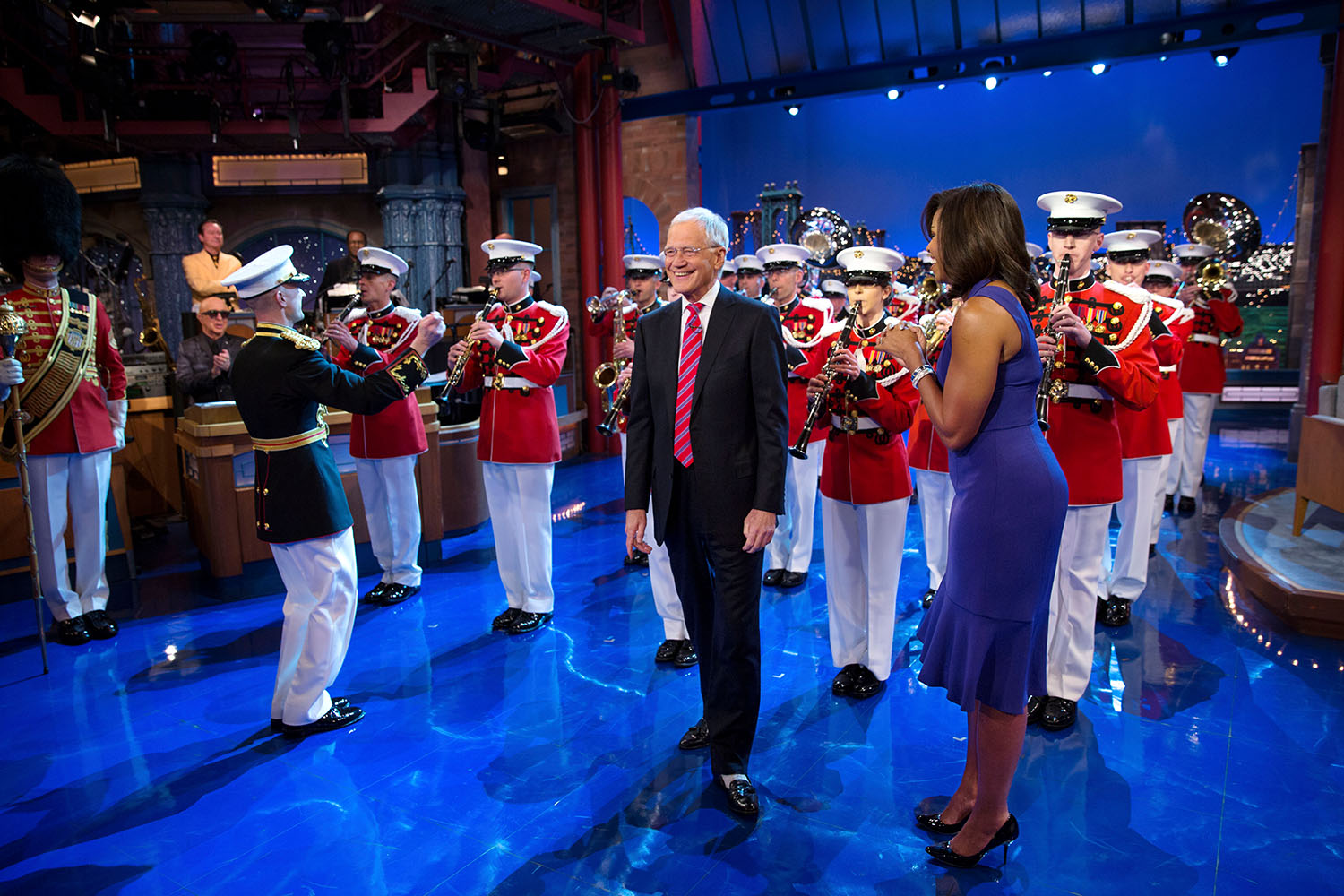
A detachment of "The President's Own", the U.S. Marine Band, appears with First Lady of the United States Michelle Obama on the Late Show with David Letterman in 2015.

A premier ensemble is a certain class of military band in the United States armed forces that exist to promote the U.S. military to the public at large, to support state ceremonies, and to preserve the heritage of American martial music. They are configured and commanded so as to attract the highest-quality musicians available, and competition for enlistment is typically fierce. As of 2020 there are eleven such units.

== Description ==
=== Organization and personnel ===
Five of the six branches of the U.S. armed forces designates one or more of its military bands as premier ensembles, although the exact terminology used to describe such units varies (the U.S. Army uses the term "Special Bands"). While branch-wide, as opposed to unit-specific, bands have existed since the formation of the U.S. Marine Band in the 1790s, the idea of forming superior music ensembles posted in the vicinity of Washington, D.C., originated with John Pershing in the early 1920s and formalized with the transition of the U.S. Navy School of Music from a training program for naval bandsmen to a multi-service institute responsible for Navy, Marine Corps, and Army premier musicians in 1951.

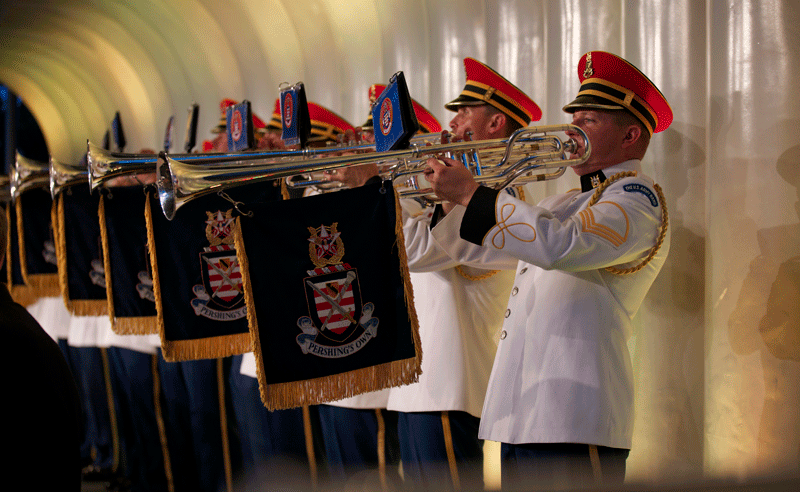
The U.S. Army Herald Trumpets, the U.S. president's fanfare unit, are a component of the U.S. Army Band, a premier ensemble.

With the exception of the United States Marine Drum and Bugle Corps, new enlistees in premier ensembles automatically enter at the pay grade of E6 (staff sergeant in the Army and Marine Corps, Technical Sergeant in the Air Force, and Petty Officer First Class in the Navy and Coast Guard) and enjoy enlistment contracts that guarantee they are not deployable outside the United States, meaning competition for billets is fierce. These organizations have typically attracted the highest-caliber musicians available, selected through a competitive audition process.

In the past, some premier ensembles have been administered separately from the rest of their branch's bands; they generally do not have any duties other than musical performance. During wartime, by contrast, non-premier U.S. Marine Corps and U.S. Army bands reconfigure into light infantry units responsible for rear-area defense and EPW (enemy prisoner-of-war) security.

Personnel of the U.S. Marine Band and U.S. Coast Guard Band forgo recruit training altogether; instead, after enlistment, they receive instruction and classes to educate them on military tradition and etiquette in order to fulfil their role.

=== Role ===
Premier ensembles are tasked with promoting the image of the U.S. armed forces through public performances, concerts, and parades. They also support official government ceremonies such as state visits, are used as recording groups to produce the music used in recruiting advertisements and other productions of the armed forces, and provide ceremonial support to the corps of cadets and midshipmen at the U.S. Military Academy (West Point), U.S. Naval Academy (Annapolis), U.S. Air Force Academy, and U.S. Coast Guard Academy.

== Bands currently designated as premier ensembles ==
Of the military's 137 regular and reserve bands, 11 are currently designated premier ensembles, including four U.S. Army bands, two U.S. Marine Corps bands, two U.S. Navy bands, two U.S. Air Force bands, and one U.S. Coast Guard band. Of the eleven premier ensembles, the U.S. Marine Band is the oldest, having been activated in 1798.

U.S. Army
U.S. Marine Corps
U.S. Navy
U.S. Air Force
U.S. Coast Guard

Ensemble	Performance sample	DUI, badge, emblem, or logo	Activated	Garrison	Description
U.S. Marine Band	"The Stars and Stripes Forever"		1798	Marine Barracks Washington is located in the United States	The U.S. Marine Band is the oldest professional music organization in the United States. Designated "the President's Own" by Thomas Jefferson, its most notable director was John Philip Sousa, who led the group from 1880 to 1892.
West Point Band	"On, Brave Old Army Team"		1817	U.S. Military Academy is located in the United States	The West Point band provides musical support to the West Point Corps of Cadets during drills and parades, and also represents the U.S. Army in broadcast performances on the Big Three television networks.
U.S. Naval Academy Band	"Melody Shop"		1852	U.S. Naval Academy is located in the United States	The U.S. Naval Academy (USNA) Band provides musical support to the USNA Corps of Midshipmen and performs for military ceremonies, ship commissioning, and funerals in the U.S. mid-Atlantic region.
U.S. Army Band	"The Rifle Regiment"		1922	Joint Base Myer–Henderson Hall is located in the United States	Known as "Pershing's Own" in honor of its original patron, General of the Armies of the United States John J. Pershing, the U.S. Army Band performs for major state events in Washington, D.C., and is the only Washington-based military band to have participated in a theater of foreign combat operations (World War II's Rhineland campaign).
U.S. Navy Band	"Hands Across the Sea"		1925	Washington Navy Yard is located in the United States	The successor to the Washington Navy Yard Band, the U.S. Navy Band is composed of a Concert Band, Ceremonial Band, Sea Chanters (concert choir), Commodores (jazz band), Country Current (country music ensemble), Cruisers (pop group) and Chamber Ensembles.
U.S. Coast Guard Band	"The Tall Ship Eagle"		1925	U.S. Coast Guard Academy is located in the United States	The United States Coast Guard Band is the premier band representing the United States Coast Guard and the Department of Homeland Security. It performs at official Coast Guard functions, public concerts, and parades. It is the Coast Guard's only active-duty band.
U.S. Marine Drum and Bugle Corps	"The Stars and Stripes Forever"		1934	Marine Barracks Washington is located in the United States	The 80-piece U.S. Marine Drum and Bugle Corps is known as "the Commandant's Own" and performs the Friday-evening sunset parade at Marine Barracks Washington and the Tuesday-evening memorials at the Iwo Jima Monument.
U.S. Air Force Band	"Honor with Dignity"		1941	Joint Base Andrews is located in the United States	The successor to the Bolling Army Air Forces Band, the U.S. Air Force Band supports state and Air Force official events in the Washington, D.C., area, as well as undertaking national performance tours to promote the Air Force.
U.S. Army Field Band	"Army Strong"		1946	Fort Meade is located in the United States	The U.S. Army Field Band tours nationally, both as a full ensemble or as smaller specialized and chamber groups, to perform in support of civic events such as centennial celebrations, sports competitions, festivals, and city or state commemorations.
U.S. Air Force Academy Band	"March for a New Era"		1955	Peterson Space Force Base is located in the United States	The U.S. Air Force Academy Band provides musical support to the U.S. Air Force Academy and performs for military ceremonies and outreach events in the states of Colorado, Idaho, Kansas, Montana, New Mexico, North and South Dakota, Utah, and Wyoming as well as undertaking national performance tours to promote the Air Force.
Old Guard Fife and Drum Corps	"Bugle Quickstep"		1960	Joint Base Myer–Henderson Hall is located in the United States	The 69-member Old Guard Fife and Drum Corps is part of the U.S. Army's 3rd Infantry Regiment, the presidential escort regiment. It is a fife and drum corps that performs on 10-hole fifes, handmade rope-tensioned drums and single-valve bugles.
