= Cavalier hat =

Wide-brimmed hat from the 17th century

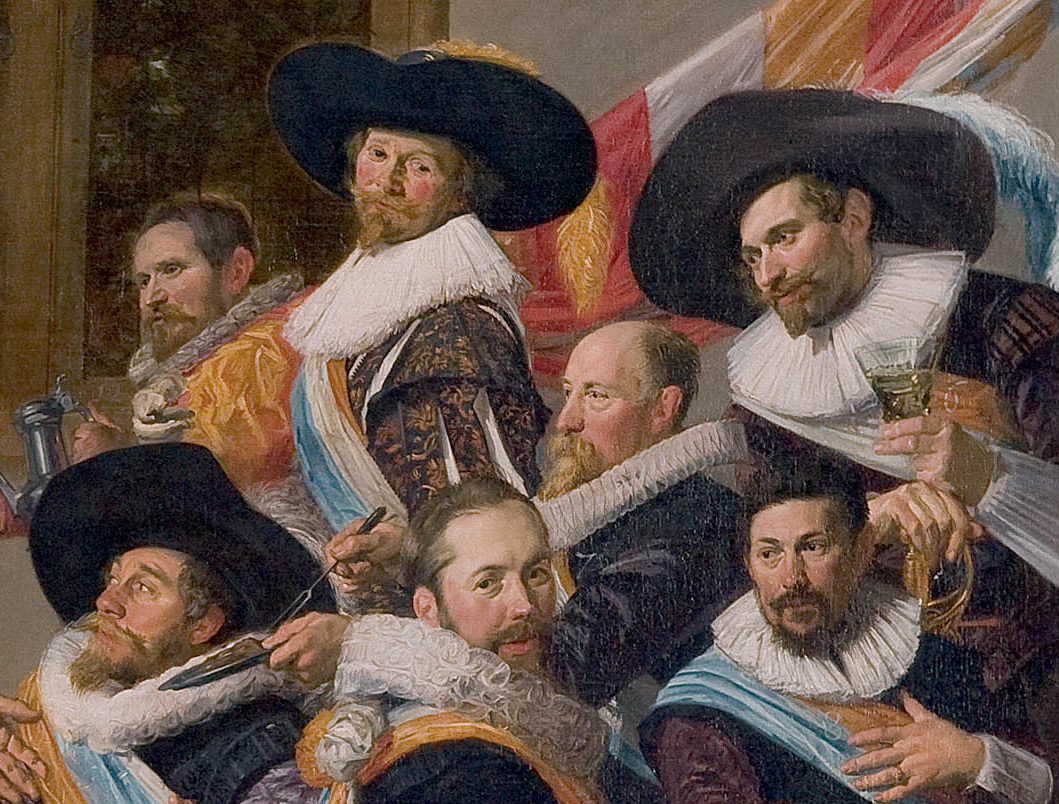
Detail of Banquet of the officers of the Calivermen Civic Guard, Haarlem, 1627, by Frans Hals showing Dutch schutterij officers wearing cavalier hats.

A cavalier hat is a variety of wide-brimmed hat that was popular in 17th-century Europe. These hats were often made from felt, and usually trimmed with an ostrich plume. They were frequently cocked up or had one side of the brim pinned to the side of the crown of the hat (similar to the slouch hat), which was then decorated with feathers. Cavalier hats derived their name from supporters of Charles I of England during the English Civil War, known as Cavaliers, who were noted for wearing extravagant clothing. It was a common hat style throughout Europe during the 17th century, until it was later replaced in fashion by the tricorne, which was originally a cavalier hat with its brim bound into a triangle.

== See also ==
- List of hat styles
- List of headgear
  - Caul (headgear)
