= William Bramwell Smith Jr. =

Canadian trumpeter and bandmaster (1929–1993)

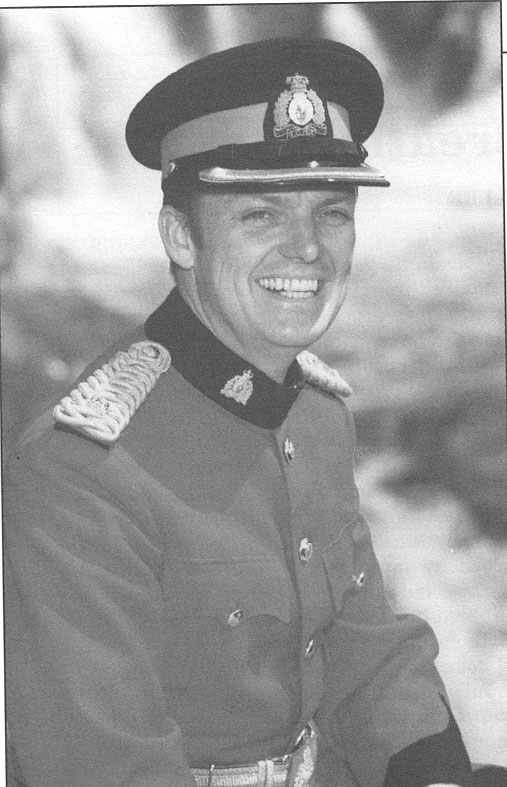

Background information
- Born: William Bramwell Smith Jr. March 3, 1929; Ottawa, Ontario, Canada
- Died: August 4, 1993 (aged 64) Toronto, Ontario, Canada
- Genres: Classical, military
- Occupations: Trumpeter, bandmaster, composer, teacher,
- Instruments: Trumpet, cornet
- Years active: 1939–1993

William Bramwell Smith Jr. (March 3, 1929 – August 4, 1993) was a Canadian trumpeter, bandmaster, composer and music teacher who is best known as the co-creator of the United States Army Herald Trumpets, playing music with the Royal Canadian Mounted Police Band, for composing music for the United States Army Band, and composing music for the office of the President of the United States.

== Early life and education ==
Born in Ottawa, Ontario, Canada, Bramwell Smith began learning the cornet at age 10 under the tutelage of his father and uncles, all professional trumpet players. By the time he was 14, Bramwell Smith was the principal cornetist with the Royal Regiment of Canada Band, a volunteer military band related to the Royal Regiment of Canada that has played for every British monarch since Queen Victoria. At 15, he won a national brass instrument competition, and shortly thereafter he won first in the cornet class at the Peel Music Festival.

Bramwell Smith studied under Ellis McLintock Sr. at the Royal Conservatory of Music in Toronto from 1945 to 1949. When he was not studying, Bramwell Smith played with dance bands and other orchestras around the area.

== Music career in the military and police ==
The U.S. Army Herald Trumpets play "Hail to the Chief" as President Barack Obama walks out of the Diplomatic Reception Room.

When he was 19, Bramwell Smith left Canada and moved to Washington, D.C., to join the United States Marine Band as a trumpet soloist. While in Washington, Bramwell Smith met Gilbert Mitchell, the Principal Cornetist in the United States Army Band. Bramwell Smith left the Marine Band in 1957 to briefly return to Canada to pursue a music career, but he was persuaded to return to the United States by Mitchell to join the United States Army Band.

=== United States Army Herald Trumpets ===
In 1959 Bramwell Smith helped create the Repertory Brass Ensemble and co-created the United States Army Herald Trumpets with Mitchell. Bramwell Smith and Mitchell shared an interest in creating a group within the United States Army that could provide more splendor to the military ceremonies, and they worked to persuade their commander Lieutenant Colonel Hugh Curry to authorize such a group. The group was patterned after traditional British fanfare trumpet ensembles and coronation trumpets. The group consists of trumpets, trombones, euphoniums and percussionists from the United States Army Ceremonial Band. Mitchell had previously formed a small brass ensemble to try to create more musical playing opportunities but this group never became a fully formed group.

"Without Bram, the United States Army Herald Trumpets would not have been formed, and the army would be poorer without this great ceremonial legacy."
—co-creator of the United States Army Herald Trumpets Gil Mitchell

After the creation of the Herald Trumpets, a subset of the United States Army Band, the group gained prominence and became the official fanfare ensemble for the President of the United States. The Herald Trumpets' first official performance was in welcoming Elizabeth II for her arrival to Chicago to celebrate the opening of the St. Lawrence Seaway. Later, Bramwell Smith's son recalled that when the leader of the Army Band found out that the Herald Trumpets would be playing for the historic event, he demanded that he conduct the group instead of Mitchell, who was amused by the leader's newfound interest in the group.

In April 1960, the Herald Trumpets had their first official event in Washington, D.C., where they played for the official meeting of Charles de Gaulle and Dwight D. Eisenhower by playing "Ruffles and Flourishes" and "Hail to the Chief". Mitchell described the event:

As President Eisenhower stepped from his car at Washington National Airport, the United States Army Herald Trumpets sounded "Four Ruffles and Flourishes" and "Hail to the Chief". It was a brilliant scene...the historically emblazoned deep-throated rope tension drums and the long silver bells of the trumpets forming a perfect line with heraldic tabards glistening in the sunlight. The sound and picture were magnificent, and the inimitable broad grin on President Eisenhower's face more than announced that from that day forth we were to be a regular part of official Washington ceremonies...This was the first time in the history of the Marine Band that they stood silent while another musical organization sounded honors for the President of the United States. Believe me, they did not take it lightly.

The Herald Trumpets also played "Ruffles and Flourishes" and a version of "Hail Columbia" during de Gaulle's official departure, which was attended by Vice President Richard Nixon and his wife Pat Nixon. Immediately after the band finished playing, Pat Nixon ran over to Mitchell and asked what that "wonderful music" was, and Mitchell gave her a copy of the score. The next day Richard Nixon sent a letter to Charles Gailey, commanding general of the Military District of Washington, praising Bramwell Smith's score by name and expressing a hope that "the Herald Trumpets will now become the standard part of the ceremonies when we welcome distinguished visitors to this country."

The Herald Trumpets would go on to become the musical ensemble chiefly responsible for signaling the approach of the president of the United States at state occasions with entrance and exit fanfares. The Herald Trumpets is most widely seen at state and official arrival ceremonies at the White House where it performs three times in the order of events: first, "Ruffles and Flourishes" and "Hail to the Chief" for the arrival of the President of the United States; second, "Call to Statesmanship" for the arrival of the visiting head of state or chief of government; third, "Presidential Processional" as the President of the United States returns to the White House.

In 1960, Bramwell Smith wrote and arranged his most played composition when he wrote "Fanfare, Processional, and Recessional" for the 1960 inauguration of John F. Kennedy. The "Processional" section was still being played by the Herald Trumpets when performing at the White House for official presidential ceremonies in 2018. He would also compose a Presidential Recessional and was a music consultant for the White House.

=== Career with the Royal Canadian Mounted Police ===
"Bram was a special person: a very talented musician, a dynamic leader and a gifted conductor. He did a great job of bringing the RCMP Band to a higher level in every respect."
—Dan Carroll & Garth Hampson, RCMP Vets

Bramwell Smith completed his military enlistment with the United States in 1961, and then became chairman of the brass department of American University.

In September 1967, Bramwell Smith returned to Canada where he served as the music director of the Royal Canadian Mounted Police Band. He first joined the RCMP as a Constable and thereafter was promoted to Staff Sergeant, then Inspector, and then Superintendent, which is the position he would hold until 1975. Bramwell Smith's addition to the RCMP helped make the band more "dynamic" and he helped bring a mix of old and new songs to the group. Bramwell Smith reportedly earned the nicknames "Memorable Music Man Mountie" and "Captain Colgate" because of his smile during those years. Under Bramwell Smith, the RCMP put out its first recording "Dynamic Sound". The RCMP also played at several international events including Hemisfair in San Antonio, Texas in 1968, the Expo '70 in Osaka, Japan in 1970, the Eastern States Exposition in Springfield, Massachusetts, a "TV Christmas Special with the Girls' Choir from St. F.X. University", "the opening of the Larsen Building in Yellowknife", and the Waltz from Swan Lake for the National Ballet of Canada. RCMP Commissioner William Leonard Higgitt once reportedly stated that "The RCMP could have toured the entire world with [Bramwell Smith's Band]!" Bramwell Smith left the RCMP in 1974.

== Teaching and other activities ==
Besides being a member of the Herald Trumpets, Bramwell Smith held various teaching positions including from 1962 to 1967 teaching at American University where he was also chairman of the brass and winds department; from 1978 to 1982 director of bands at Humber College in Toronto while also being the conductor of the Humber Concert Band from 1983 to 1986; and director of the concert band at the University of Toronto in 1987.

Bramwell Smith also worked with music companies while teaching becoming the head clinician for the company of Holton, who produced musical instruments, where he would conduct and play at university seminars on behalf of the company. He also later became an educational consultant for Yamaha of Canada from 1975 to 1978.

Bramwell Smith held other interesting positions during his career including being a consultant to King Hassan II from 1982 to 1983 along with director of music for the Royal Moroccan Air Force Bands in Rabat, Morocco.

== Writings and recordings ==
Bramwell Smith wrote "Training for reality", Music Journal, Jan 1965. Bramwell Smith's music is recorded in several albums: as a soloist trumpet player on the album "Bram Smith and His Trumpet" in 1957 published on the Golden Crest (CR 4012); as a conductor of the RCMP in "Dynamic Sound" in 1972 (Polydor 2917–068) and featured in the film Artistry in Brass.

== Family ==
Bramwell Smith also taught music to his son Sergeant Major William Bramwell Smith, III. In 1974 the younger Bramwell Smith became a trumpeter with Nimmons 'N' Nine Plus Six. Bramwell Smith III was also a trumpeter in the US Army Band and a non-commissioned officer in charge (NCOIC) of the Herald Trumpets for more than a decade, where he performed the part of the high E-flat soprano.

Bramwell Smith's grandson, William Bramwell Smith, IV also was a trumpet player in the U.S. Military playing for the 257th Army Band from 2001 to 2014 and played for the 2008 Presidential Inauguration of Barack Obama. William Bramwell Smith, IV has gone on to be the Band Director for Riverside High School in Loudoun County, Virginia where he led the group to USBANDS VA State Champions for Class A (2017) and Class AA (2018). On December 29, 2024, William Bramwell Smith, IV conducted his high school concert band at Smith Square Hall and conducted the "Presidential Processional" written by William Bramwell Smith Jr. to be broadcast on Youth Music of the World for the Public Broadcasting Service.

== Death ==
William Bramwell Smith Jr. died on August 4, 1993, in Toronto, Ontario, Canada of cancer. After his death, his remains were interred in Arlington National Cemetery.
