= Old Guard Fife and Drum Corps =

Military band of the U.S. Army

The United States Army Old Guard Fife and Drum Corps
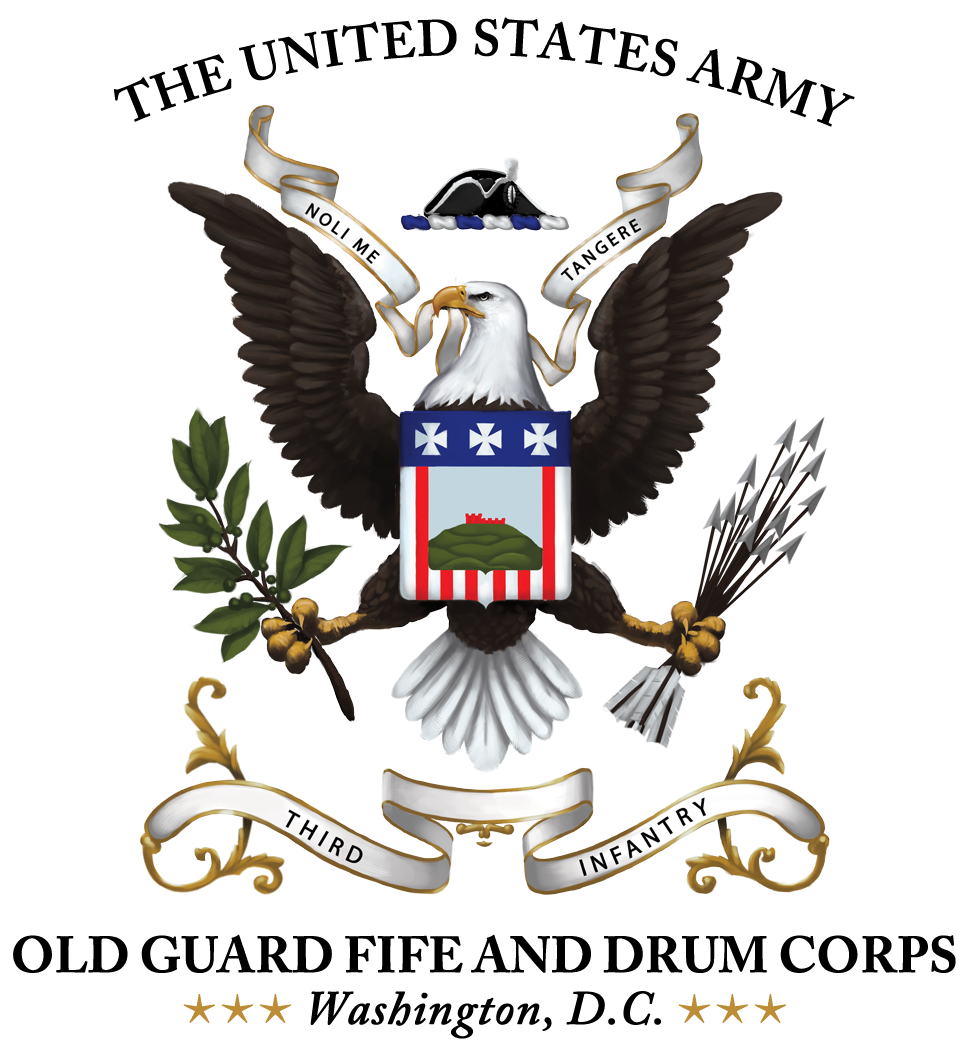
- Official unit crest
- Active: February 23, 1960 – present
- Country: United States of America
- Branch: United States Army
- Role: Special Band
- Part of: 3rd U.S. Infantry Regiment (The Old Guard)
- Garrison/HQ: Joint Base Myer–Henderson Hall
- Website: https://fifeanddrum.army.mil/

Commanders
- Commander: CW4 Thomas Jackson
- Corps Sergeant Major: CSM Lutricia Fields
- Operations Sergeant Major: SGM Ross Pavolko
- Corps First Sergeant: 1SG William Parks

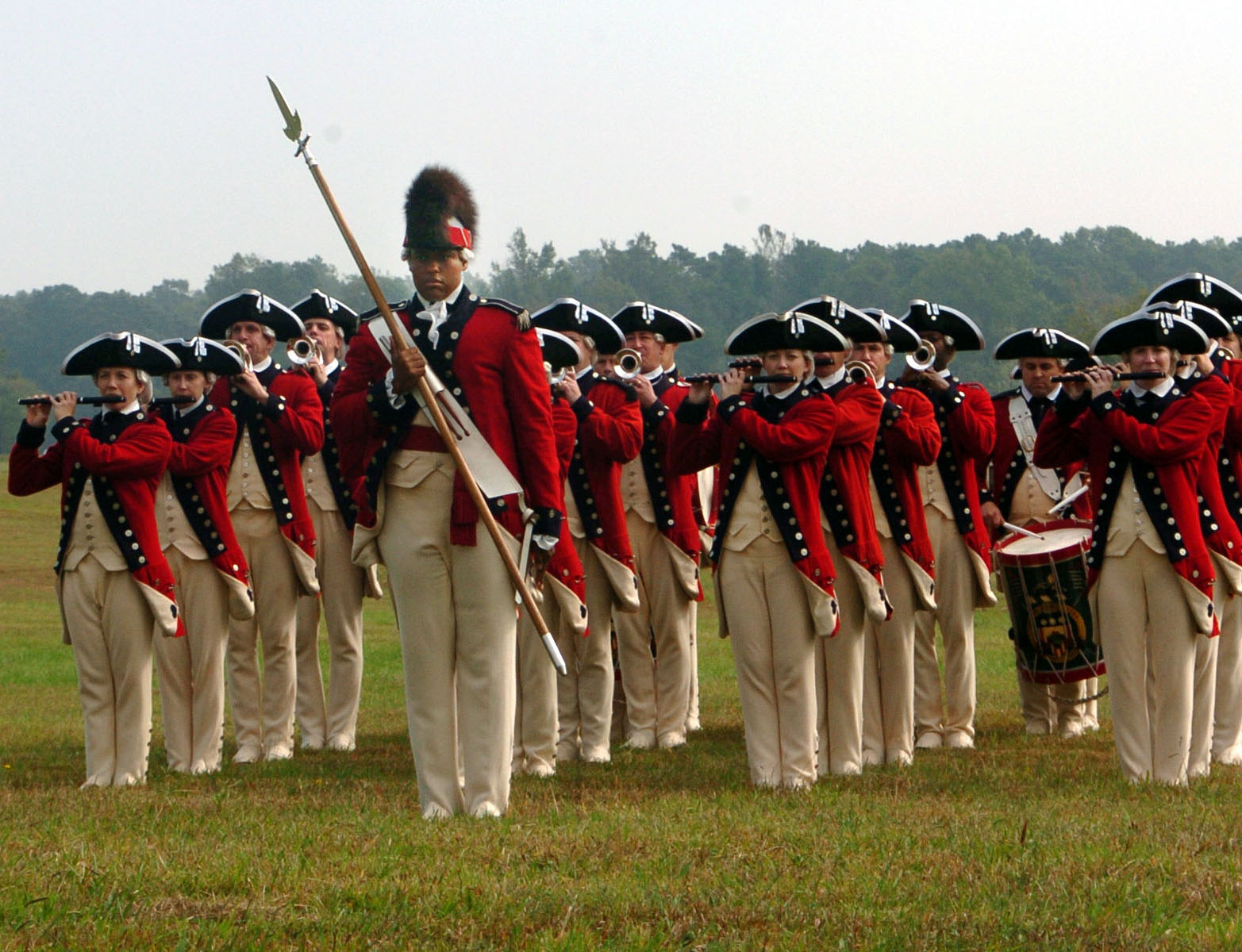
The United States Army Old Guard Fife and Drum Corps performs at a celebration commemorating the 225th anniversary of the American victory at the Siege of Yorktown, during the American Revolutionary War.

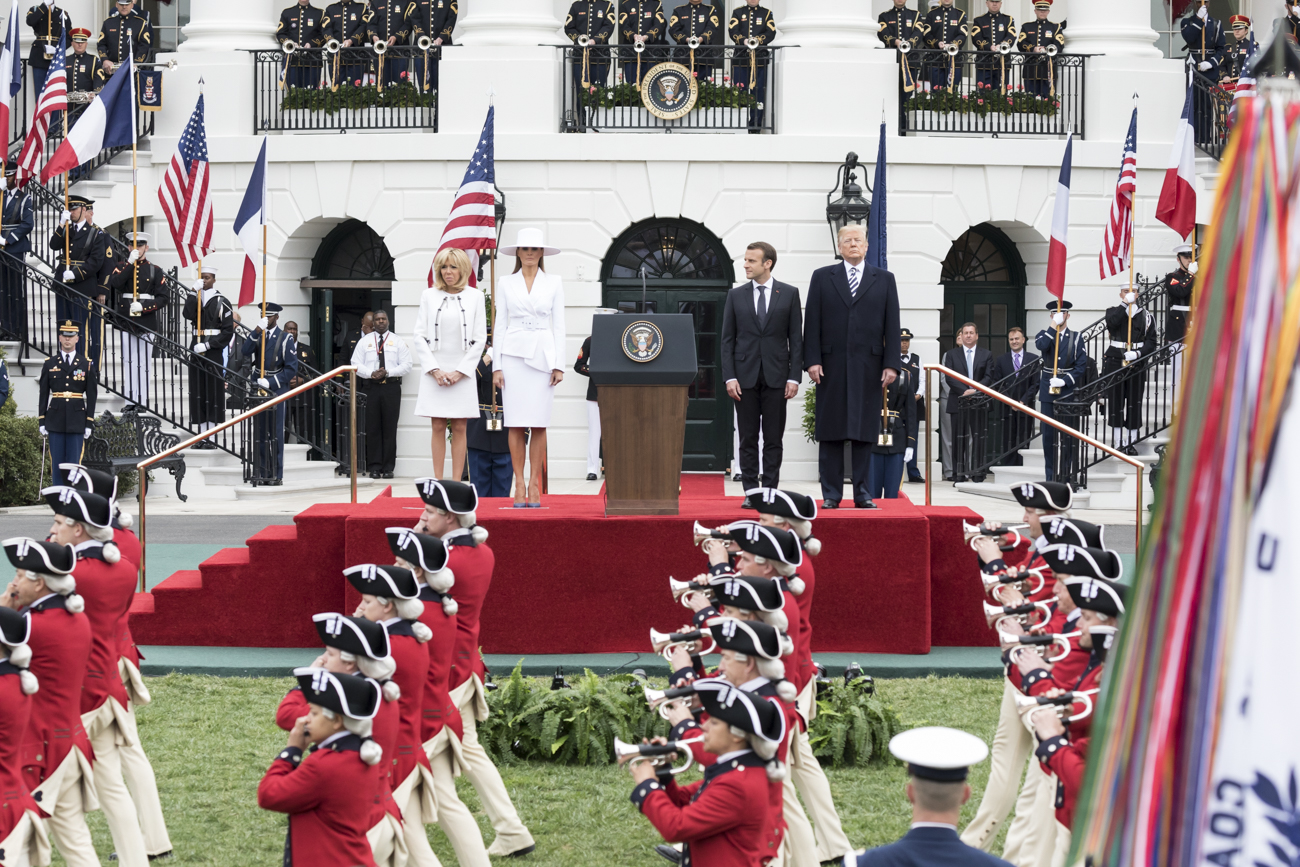

The United States Army Old Guard Fife and Drum Corps is one of four premier musical organizations of the United States Army. Members perform using musical instruments and wearing uniforms similar to those used by military musicians of the Continental Army during the American Revolution.

It is the only unit of its kind in the United States' armed forces, and is part of the 3rd U.S. Infantry ("The Old Guard"). The Fife and Drum Corps has been stationed at Fort Myer, Virginia, since its founding on February 23, 1960.

== Musicians ==
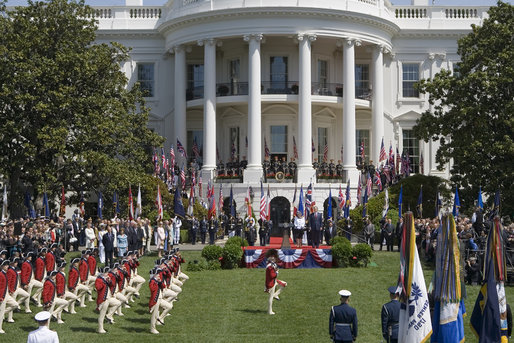
The United States Army Old Guard Fife and Drum Corps perform during a State Arrival Ceremony held on the South Lawn of the White House.

The musicians of this unit recall the fifes and drums from the days of the American Revolution as they perform in uniforms patterned after those worn by the musicians of Gen. George Washington's Continental Army. Military musicians of the period wore the reverse colors of the regiments to which they were assigned. The uniforms worn by the members of the Corps are dated circa 1781, and consist of black tricorn hats, white wigs, waistcoats, colonial coveralls, and red regimental coats. The 69-member Corps uses 10-hole fifes, handmade rope-tensioned drums and two-valve bugles, which bring to life the exciting sounds of the Continental Army.

=== The Troop Step ===
Perhaps the most distinctive signature of the musicians of this unit is the troop step, reminiscent of the ceremonial steps of the Household Regiments of the British Army. While playing their instruments, the musicians march forward at a slow, ceremonial pace (pass in review), while pointing their toes, toe touching the ground first. After these troop steps, typically, the Fife and Drum Corps changes back to normal pace, stepping off at normal step, playing Yankee Doodle, to the applause of the crowds.

=== Drum Major ===
The drum major of the unit is distinguished from the other musicians by his headgear, the light-infantry Cap. In contrast to modern Army bands, and as an indication of prominence, he carries an espontoon instead of the standard mace. The espontoon is an 18th-century weapon carried by officers. However, it is used by the drum major to issue silent commands to the Corps.

== Performances ==
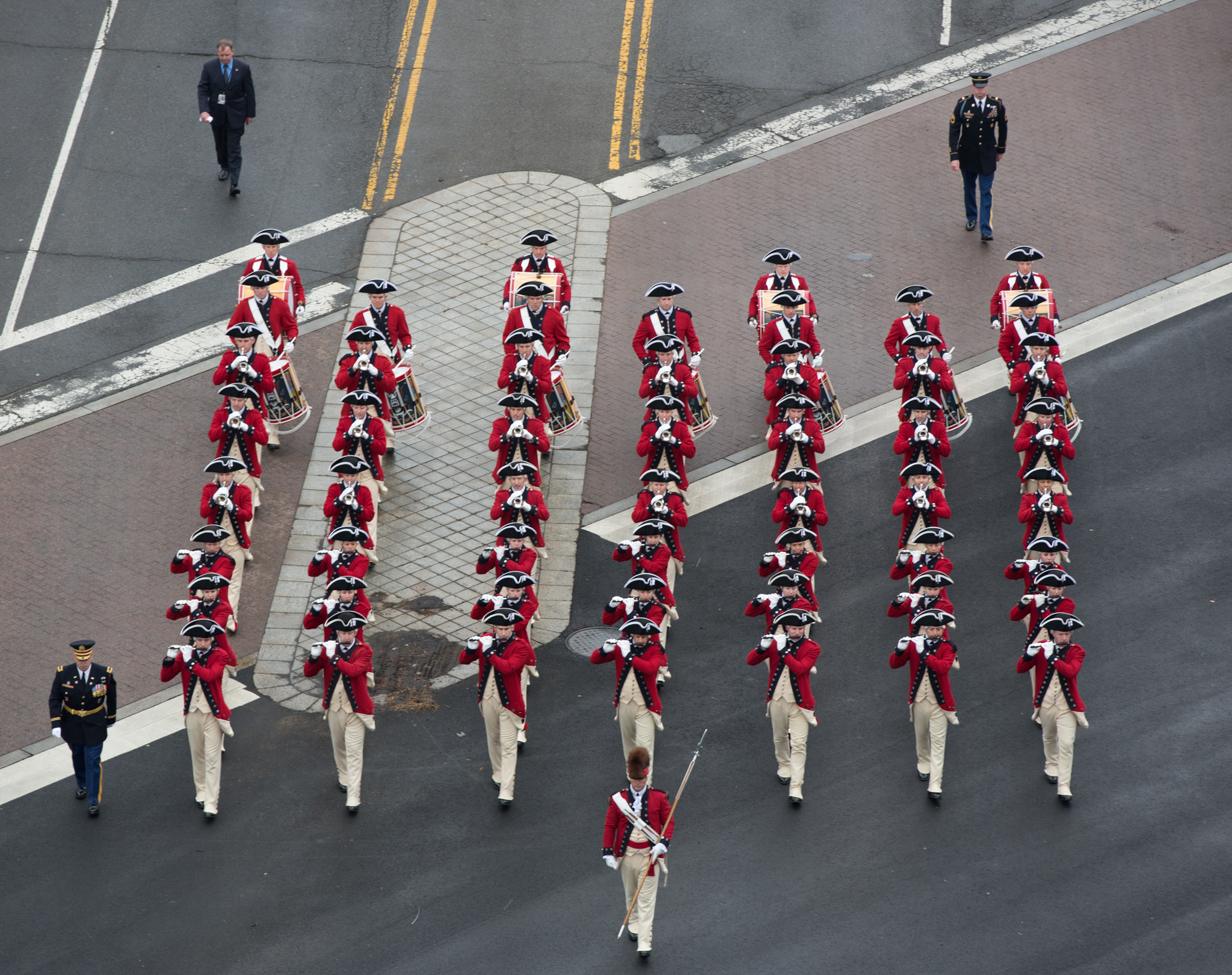
The Corps at the 58th Presidential Inauguration.

As an official representative of the U.S. Army, the Corps averages over 500 performances annually. The Corps has entertained millions of people in major parades, pageants and historical celebrations throughout the United States; and has served America as a goodwill ambassador as far away as Europe, Australia and Canada. Major sporting events the Corps has performed at include NCAA bowl games, NBA games, NFL games (including Super Bowls), the Kentucky Derby, the Indianapolis 500, and the 1980 Winter Olympics in Lake Placid, New York.

In support of the President of the United States, the Corps performs at armed forces arrival ceremonies for visiting dignitaries and heads of state at the White House, and has participated in every presidential inaugural parade since President John F. Kennedy's in 1961. The Corps also performed at the funeral of Kennedy. Today both men and women are members of the unit.

They have also performed at the Royal Edinburgh Military Tattoo.

== Instruments ==
The Corps personnel play fifes, bugles, snare drums, and bass drums. Obtaining the instruments posed a challenge, as only a few manufacturers produce historical instruments. In 2012, a batch of 20 drums were produced in Basel, Switzerland, home to the Carnival of Basel, where a long tradition of marching drums and piccolo flutes is alive. In 2023, the Corps introduced a new set of drums manufactured by Loyal Drums in Fredericksburg, VA. The fifes were built in Switzerland by Skip Healy of the Healy Flute Company, a professional musician and U.S. ex-pat.

== Gallery ==
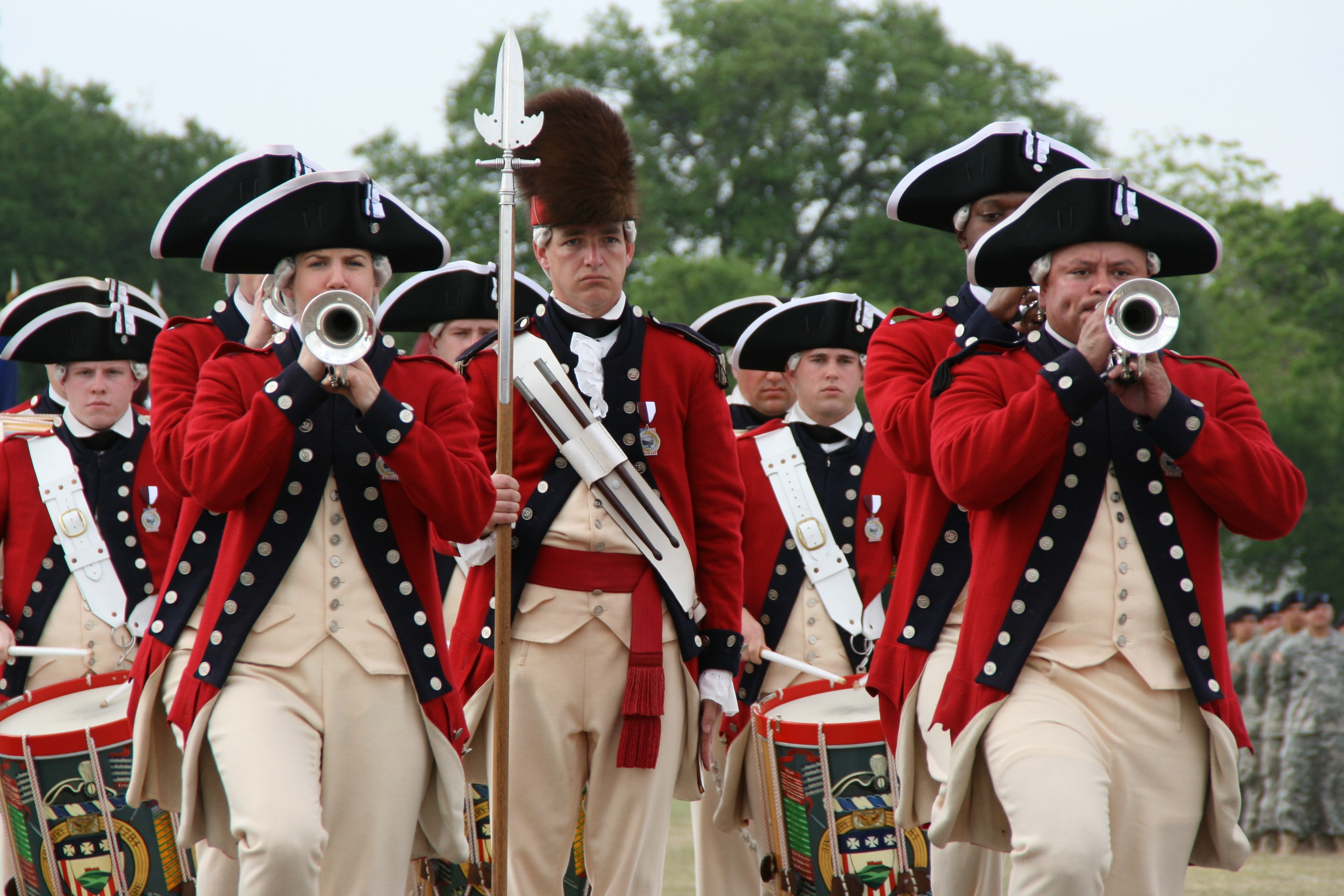
The United States Army Old Guard Fife and Drum Corps thrill an audience with their musical skills while on parade in 2008. The unit recalls the American Revolutionary era by dressing in colonial uniform and tricorn hats.

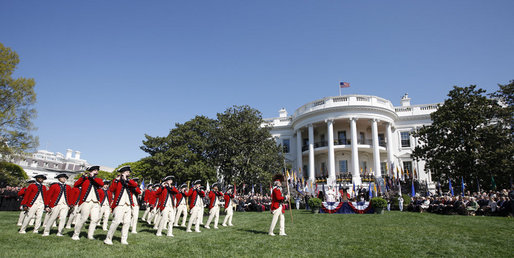
Members of The United States Army Old Guard Fife and Drum Corps parade on the South Lawn of the White House during a State Arrival Ceremony for Pope Benedict XVI on April 16, 2008.

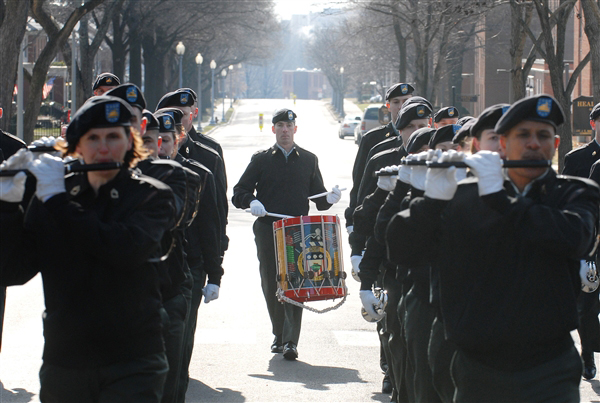
United States Army Staff Sgt. Brian L. Barnhart, a snare drummer with the United States Army Old Guard Fife and Drum Corps, trails the ensemble down Sheridan Avenue on Fort Myer during a January 9, 2009 rehearsal for then President-elect Barack Obama's upcoming inaugural parade.

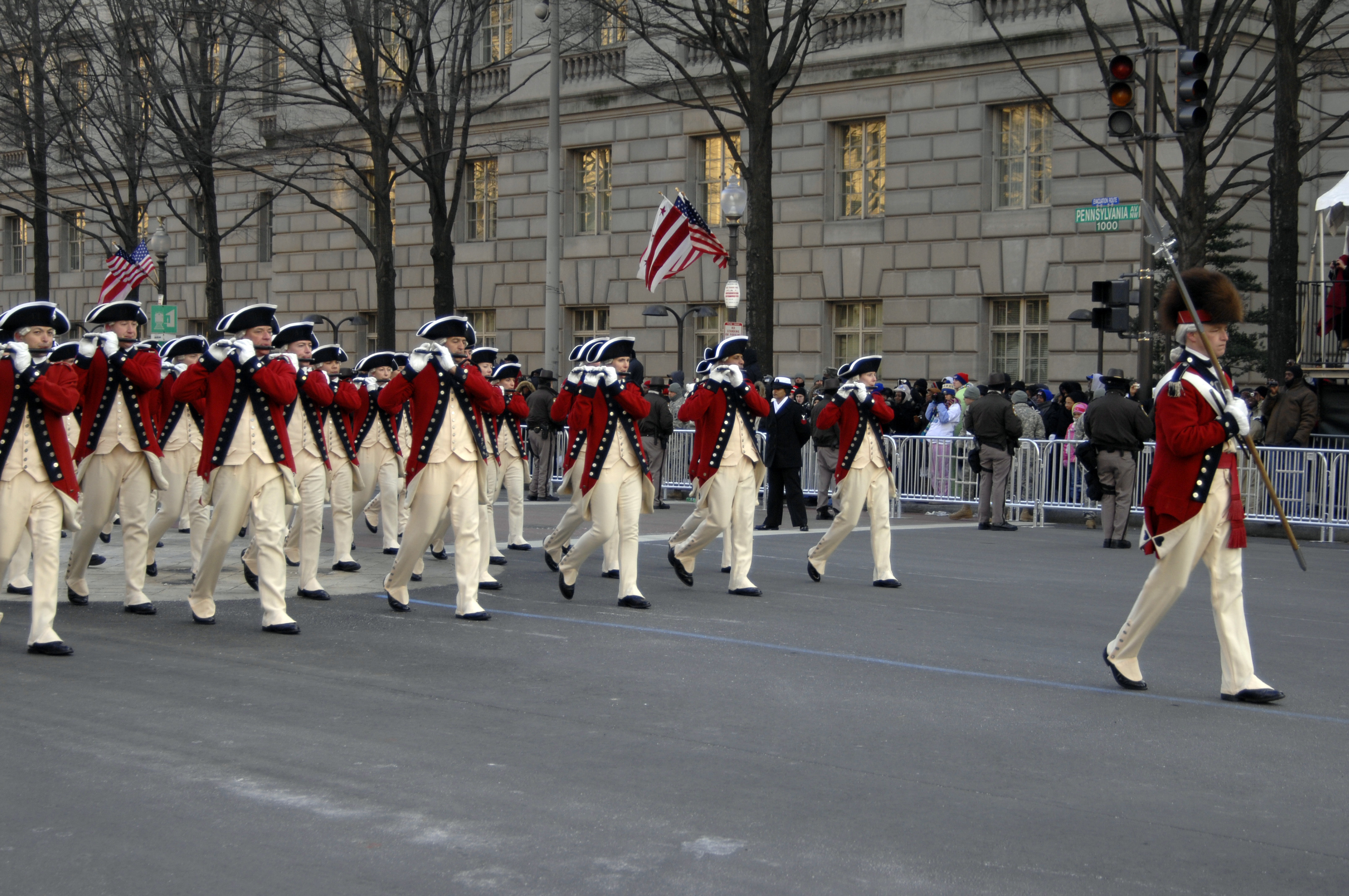
The United States Army Old Guard Fife and Drum Corps seen marching down Pennsylvania Avenue during the presidential inaugural parade held on January 20, 2009.

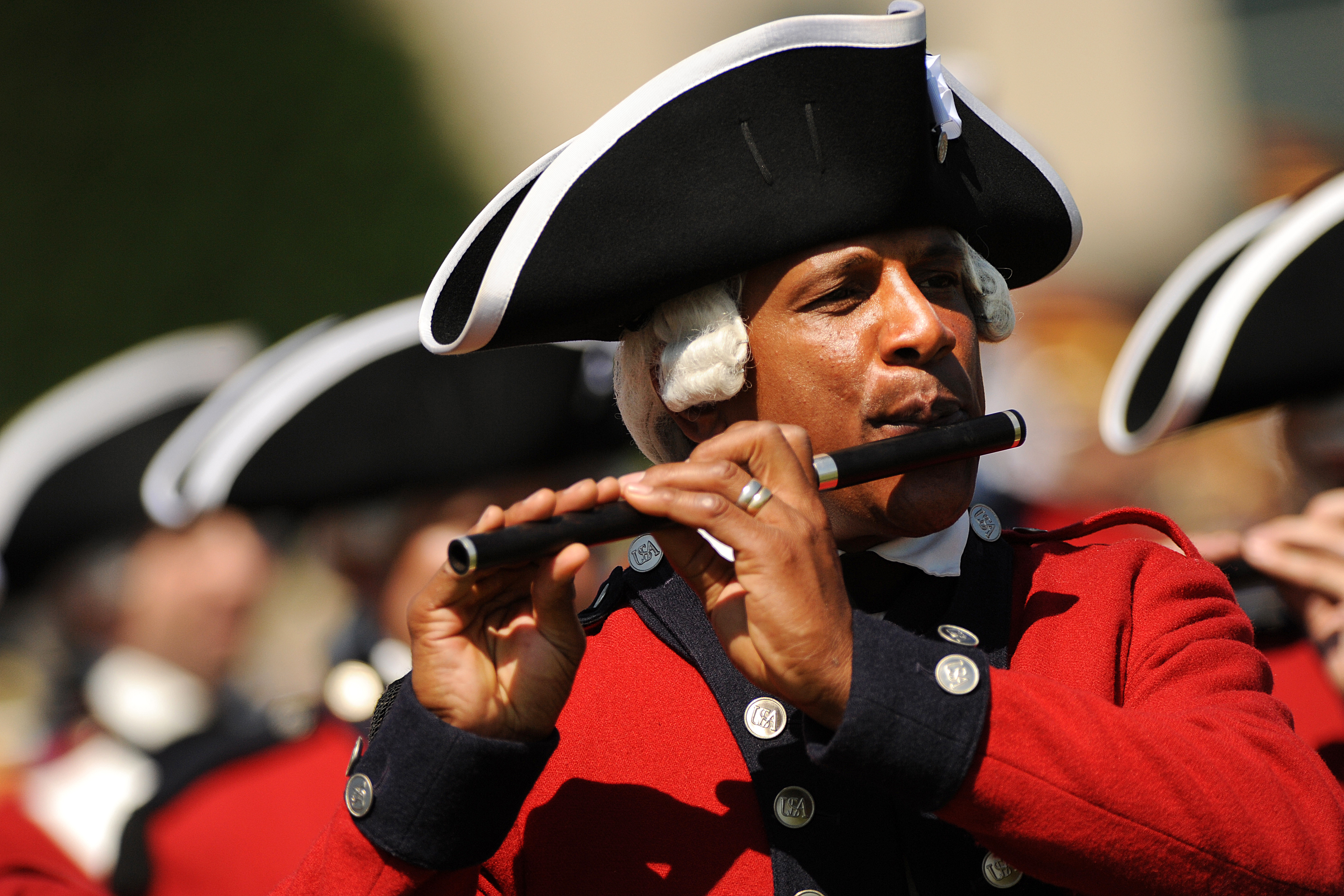
A member of the drum corps with a fife.

== See also ==
- Corps of Drums
- U.S. Army Herald Trumpets
- Commander-in-Chief's Guard (3rd Infantry Regiment)

== Bibliography ==
- Abbott James A., and Elaine M. Rice. Designing Camelot: The Kennedy White House Restoration. Van Nostrand Reinhold: 1998. ISBN 0-442-02532-7.
- Clinton, Hillary Rodham. An Invitation to the White House: At Home with History. Simon & Schuster: 2000. ISBN 0-684-85799-5.
- Garrett, Wendell. Our Changing White House. Northeastern University Press: 1995. ISBN 1-55553-222-5.
