= 1918 in the United States =

- Decades: 1890s; 1900s; 1910s; 1920s; 1930s
- See also: History of the United States (1918–1945); Timeline of United States history (1900–1929); List of years in the United States

Events from the year 1918 in the United States.

== Incumbents ==
=== Federal government ===
- President: Woodrow Wilson (D-New Jersey)
- Vice President: Thomas R. Marshall (D-Indiana)
- Chief Justice: Edward Douglass White (Louisiana)
- Speaker of the House of Representatives: Champ Clark (D-Missouri)
- Congress: 65th

==== State governments ====
Governors and lieutenant governors

=== Governors ===
- Governor of Alabama: Charles Henderson (Democratic)
- Governor of Arizona: George W. P. Hunt (Democratic)
- Governor of Arkansas: Charles Hillman Brough (Democratic)
- Governor of California: William Stephens (Republican)
- Governor of Colorado: Julius Caldeen Gunter (Democratic)
- Governor of Connecticut: Marcus H. Holcomb (Republican)
- Governor of Delaware: John G. Townsend, Jr. (Republican)
- Governor of Florida: Sidney Johnston Catts (Prohibition)
- Governor of Georgia: Hugh M. Dorsey (Democratic)
- Governor of Idaho: Moses Alexander (Democratic)
- Governor of Illinois: Frank O. Lowden (Republican)
- Governor of Indiana: James P. Goodrich (Republican)
- Governor of Iowa: William L. Harding (Republican)
- Governor of Kansas: Arthur Capper (Republican)
- Governor of Kentucky: Augustus O. Stanley (Democratic)
- Governor of Louisiana: Ruffin G. Pleasant (Democratic)
- Governor of Maine: Carl E. Milliken (Republican)
- Governor of Maryland: Emerson C. Harrington (Democratic)
- Governor of Massachusetts: Samuel W. McCall (Republican)
- Governor of Michigan: Albert Sleeper (Republican)
- Governor of Minnesota: J. A. A. Burnquist (Republican)
- Governor of Mississippi: Theodore G. Bilbo (Democratic)
- Governor of Missouri: Frederick D. Gardner (Democratic)
- Governor of Montana: Sam V. Stewart (Democratic)
- Governor of Nebraska: Keith Neville (Democratic)
- Governor of Nevada: Emmet D. Boyle (Democratic)
- Governor of New Hampshire: Henry W. Keyes (Republican)
- Governor of New Jersey: Walter Evans Edge (Republican)
- Governor of New Mexico: Washington E. Lindsey (Republican)
- Governor of New York: Charles S. Whitman (Republican) (until end of December 31)
- Governor of North Carolina: Thomas Walter Bickett (Democratic)
- Governor of North Dakota: Lynn Frazier (Republican)
- Governor of Ohio: James M. Cox (Democratic)
- Governor of Oklahoma: Robert L. Williams (Democratic)
- Governor of Oregon: James Withycombe (Republican)
- Governor of Pennsylvania: Martin Grove Brumbaugh (Republican)
- Governor of Rhode Island: R. Livingston Beeckman (Republican)
- Governor of South Carolina: Richard Irvine Manning III (Democratic)
- Governor of South Dakota: Peter Norbeck (Republican)
- Governor of Tennessee: Tom C. Rye (Democratic)
- Governor of Texas: William P. Hobby (Democratic)
- Governor of Utah: Simon Bamberger (Democratic)
- Governor of Vermont: Horace F. Graham (Republican)
- Governor of Virginia: Henry Carter Stuart (Democratic) (until February 1), Westmoreland Davis (Democratic) (starting February 1)
- Governor of Washington: Ernest Lister (Democratic)
- Governor of West Virginia: John J. Cornwell (Democratic)
- Governor of Wisconsin: Emanuel L. Philipp (Republican)
- Governor of Wyoming: Frank L. Houx (Democratic)

=== Lieutenant governors ===
- Lieutenant Governor of Alabama: Thomas E. Kilby (Democratic)
- Lieutenant Governor of California: vacant
- Lieutenant Governor of Colorado: James A. Pulliam (Democratic)
- Lieutenant Governor of Connecticut: Clifford B. Wilson (Republican)
- Lieutenant Governor of Delaware: Lewis E. Eliason (Democratic)
- Lieutenant Governor of Idaho: Ernest L. Parker (Democratic)
- Lieutenant Governor of Illinois: John G. Oglesby (Republican)
- Lieutenant Governor of Indiana: Edgar D. Bush (Republican)
- Lieutenant Governor of Iowa: Ernest Robert Moore (Republican)
- Lieutenant Governor of Kansas: William Yoast Morgan (Republican)
- Lieutenant Governor of Kentucky: James D. Black (Democratic)
- Lieutenant Governor of Louisiana: Fernand Mouton (Democratic)
- Lieutenant Governor of Massachusetts: Calvin Coolidge (Republican)
- Lieutenant Governor of Michigan: Luren D. Dickinson (Republican)
- Lieutenant Governor of Minnesota: Thomas Frankson (Republican)
- Lieutenant Governor of Mississippi: Lee Maurice Russell (Democratic)
- Lieutenant Governor of Missouri: Wallace Crossley (Democratic)
- Lieutenant Governor of Montana: W. W. McDowell (Democratic)
- Lieutenant Governor of Nebraska: Edgar Howard (Democratic)
- Lieutenant Governor of Nevada: Maurice J. Sullivan (Democratic)
- Lieutenant Governor of New Mexico: vacant
- Lieutenant Governor of New York: Edward Schoeneck (Republican) (until end of December 31)
- Lieutenant Governor of North Carolina: Oliver Max Gardner (Democratic)
- Lieutenant Governor of North Dakota: Anton T. Kraabel (Republican)
- Lieutenant Governor of Ohio: Earl D. Bloom (Democratic)
- Lieutenant Governor of Oklahoma: Martin E. Trapp (Democratic)
- Lieutenant Governor of Pennsylvania: Frank B. McClain (Republican)
- Lieutenant Governor of Rhode Island: Emery J. San Souci (Republican)
- Lieutenant Governor of South Carolina: Andrew Bethea (Democratic)
- Lieutenant Governor of South Dakota: William H. McMaster (Republican)
- Lieutenant Governor of Tennessee: W. R. Crabtree (Democratic)
- Lieutenant Governor of Texas: vacant
- Lieutenant Governor of Vermont: Roger W. Hulburd (Republican)
- Lieutenant Governor of Virginia: James Taylor Ellyson (Democratic) (until February 1), Benjamin Franklin Buchanan (Democratic) (starting February 1)
- Lieutenant Governor of Washington: Louis Folwell Hart (Republican)
- Lieutenant Governor of Wisconsin: Edward F. Dithmar (Republican)

== Events ==
=== January–March ===
- January – The World Tomorrow pacifist magazine begins publication.
- January 8 – President Woodrow Wilson delivers his Fourteen Points speech.
- February 21 – The last Carolina parakeet (the last breed of parrot native to the eastern U.S.), a male named "Incas", dies at the Cincinnati Zoo.
- March – The Liberator socialist magazine begins publication.
- March 4 – A soldier at Camp Funston, Kansas falls sick with the first confirmed case of the Spanish flu.
- March 19 – The U.S. Congress establishes time zones and approves daylight saving time (DST goes into effect on March 31).

=== April–June ===
- April 21 – The 6.7 M_{w} San Jacinto earthquake shakes southern California with a maximum Mercalli intensity of IX (Severe), causing $200,000 in damage, one death, and several injuries.
- May 2 – General Motors acquires the Chevrolet Motor Company of Delaware.
- May 15 – The United States Post Office Department (later renamed the United States Postal Service) begins the first regular airmail service in the world (between New York City, Philadelphia and Washington, DC).
- May 16 – The Sedition Act of 1918 is approved by the U.S. Congress.
- May 22 – The small town of Codell, Kansas is hit for the fifth year in a row by a tornado. Coincidentally, all three tornadoes hit on the same date.
- May 23 – First victims of the "axeman of New Orleans" in a 17-month series of brutal murders mainly directed at Italian American shopkeepers and their families; the serial killer is never identified.
- June 8 – The total solar eclipse of June 8, 1918 crosses the United States from Washington State to Florida.
- June 22
  - Suspects in the Chicago Restaurant Poisonings are arrested, and more than 100 waiters are taken into custody, for poisoning restaurant customers with a lethal powder called Mickey Finn.
  - Hammond Circus Train Wreck: A locomotive engineer fell asleep and ran his troop train into the rear of a circus train near Hammond, Indiana. The circus train held 400 performers and roustabouts of the Hagenbeck-Wallace Circus.

=== July–September ===
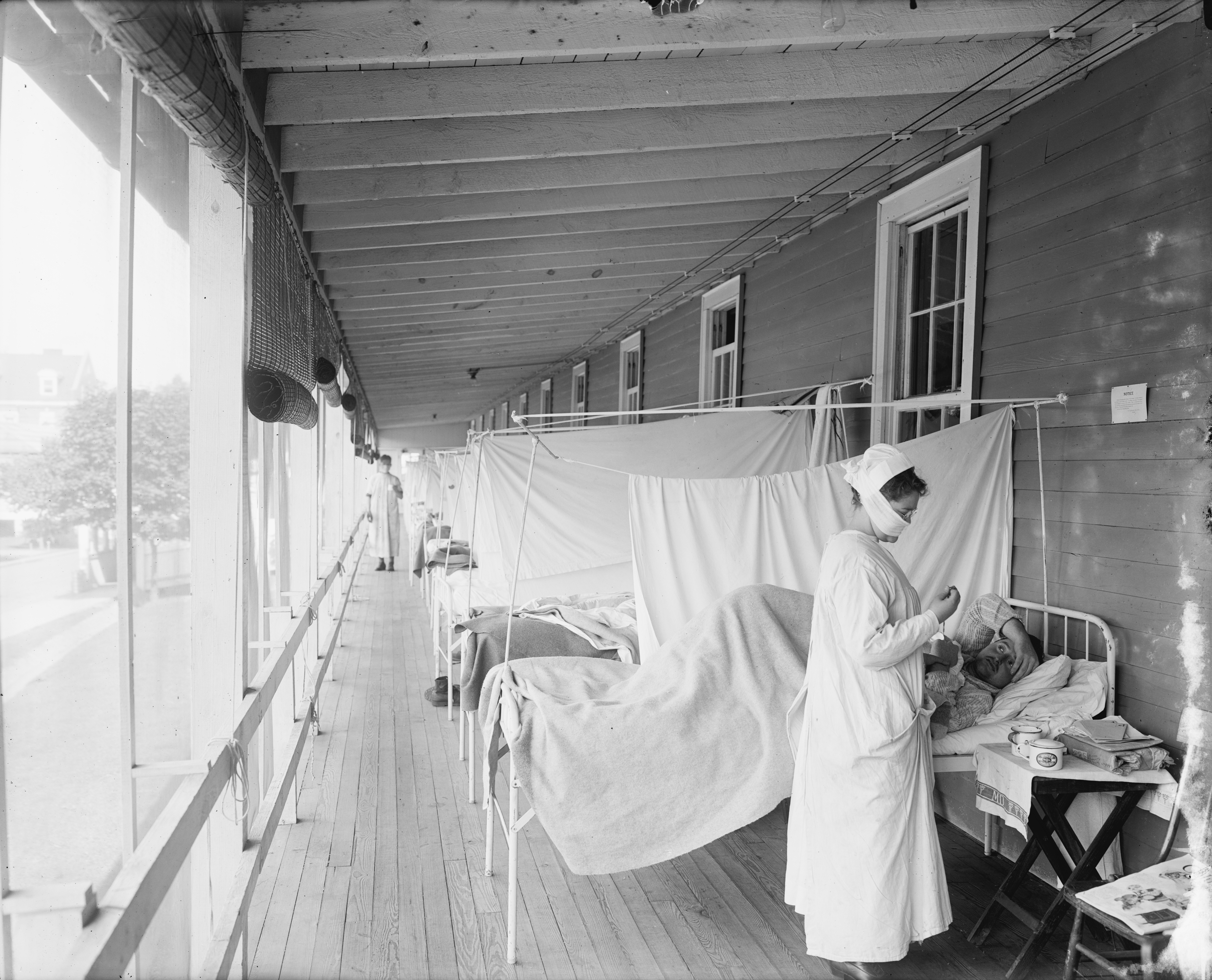
1918 flu pandemic

- July 9 – Great Train Wreck of 1918: In Nashville, Tennessee, an inbound local train collides with an outbound express, killing 101 and injuring 171. It is considered the worst rail accident in U.S. history.
- August – A deadly second wave of the Spanish flu starts in France, Sierra Leone and the United States.
- August 13 – Opha May Johnson becomes the first woman to enlist in the United States Marine Corps.
- August 27 – Border War; Battle of Ambos Nogales – U.S. Army forces skirmish with Mexican Carrancistas at Nogales, Arizona, in the only battle of World War I fought on U.S. soil.
- September 11 – The Boston Red Sox defeat the Chicago Cubs for the 1918 World Series championship, their last World Series win until 2004.
- September 12–15 – World War I: Battle of Saint-Mihiel fought in France: The first and only offensive launched solely by the American Expeditionary Forces under John J. Pershing overcomes German forces in the Saint-Mihiel salient.

=== October–December ===
- October 4 – The T. A. Gillespie Company Shell Loading Plant explosion in New Jersey kills 100+, and destroys enough ammunition to supply the Western Front for 6 months.
- October 8 – World War I: In the Forest of Argonne in France, U.S. Corporal Alvin C. York almost single-handedly kills 25 German soldiers and captures 132.
- October 11 – The 7.1 M_{w} San Fermín earthquake shakes Puerto Rico with a maximum Mercalli intensity of IX (Violent), killing 76–116 people. A destructive tsunami contributed to the damage and loss of life.
- October 12 – 1918 Cloquet Fire: The city of Cloquet, Minnesota and nearby areas are destroyed in a fire, killing 453.
- October 25 – The SS Princess Sophia sinks on Vanderbilt Reef near Juneau, Alaska; 353 people die in the greatest maritime disaster in the Pacific Northwest.
- November 1 – Malbone Street Wreck: The worst rapid transit accident in world history occurs under the intersection of Malbone Street and Flatbush Avenue, in Brooklyn, New York City, with at least 93 dead.
- November 2 – Thomas Kilby is elected the 36th governor of Alabama defeating Dallas B. Smith.
- November 11 – World War I ends.
- December 4 – President of the U.S. Woodrow Wilson sails for the Paris Peace Conference, becoming the first U.S. president to travel to Europe while in office.
- December 19 – Ripley's Believe It or Not! first appears as a cartoon under the title Champs and Chumps in The New York Globe.

=== Undated ===
- The Native American Church is formally founded.
- The Association Against the Prohibition Amendment is founded to oppose Prohibition in the U.S.
- George Drumm's concert march "Hail, America" is first performed in New York City.

=== Ongoing ===
- Progressive Era (1890s–1920s)
- Lochner era (c. 1897–c. 1937)
- U.S. occupation of Haiti (1915–1934)
- U.S. occupation of the Dominican Republic (1916-1924)
- World War I, U.S. involvement (1917–1918)
- First Red Scare (1917–1920)

== Births ==
=== January ===
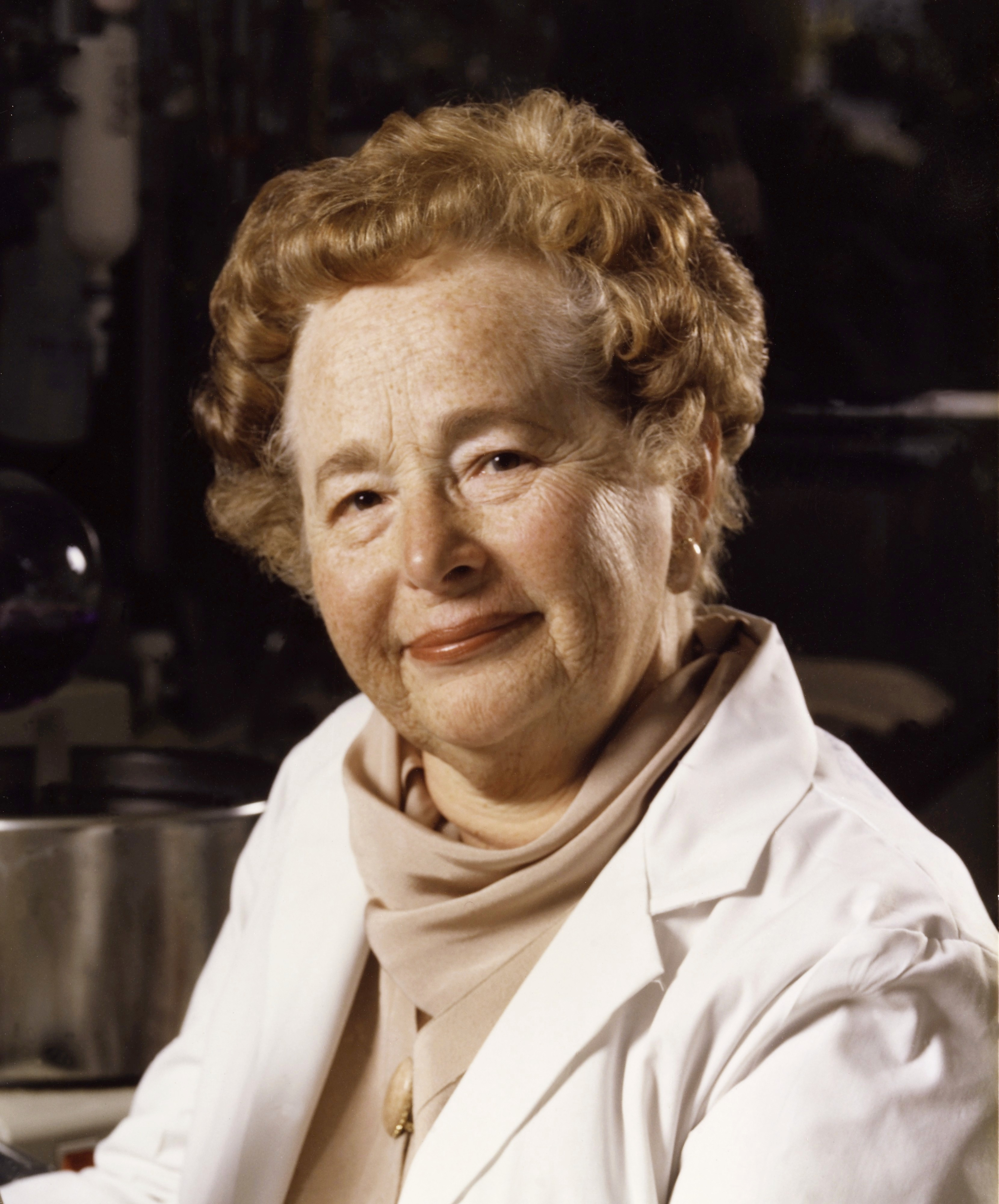
Gertrude B. Elion

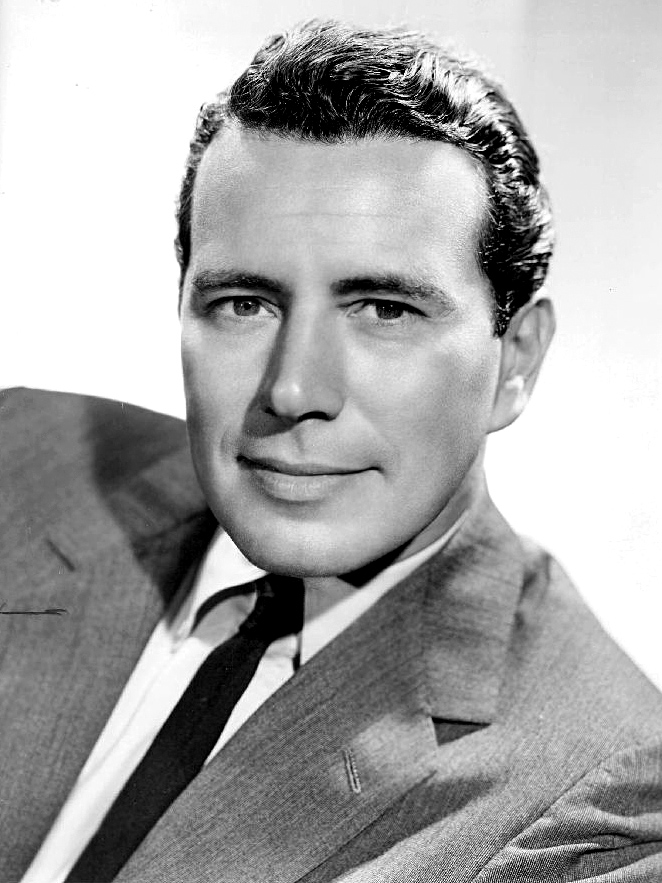
John Forsythe

- January 1 – Ed Price, American soldier, pilot, and politician (d. 2012)
- January 9 – Alma Ziegler, professional baseball player (d. 2005)
- January 15 – Ira B. Harkey Jr., newspaper editor (d. 2006)
- January 16 – Stirling Silliphant, screenwriter and producer (d. 1996)
- January 17 – George M. Leader, politician (d. 2013)
- January 19
  - Peter Hobbs, actor (d. 2011)
  - John H. Johnson, African-American publisher, founder of Ebony (d. 2005)
- January 20 – Nevin S. Scrimshaw, food scientist (d. 2013)
- January 21 – Richard Winters, World War II soldier (d. 2011)
- January 23 – Gertrude B. Elion, pharmacologist, winner of Nobel Prize in Physiology or Medicine in 1988 (d. 1999)
- January 24 – Oral Roberts, neo-Pentecostal televangelist (d. 2009)
- January 25 – Ernie Harwell, baseball sportscaster (d. 2010)
- January 26
  - Philip José Farmer, writer (d. 2009)
  - Vito Scotti, actor (d. 1996)
- January 27 – Elmore James, musician (d. 1963)
- January 29 – John Forsythe, actor (Dynasty) (d. 2010)
- January 31 – Millie Dunn Veasey, African-American civil rights activist and World War II soldier (d. 2018)

=== February ===
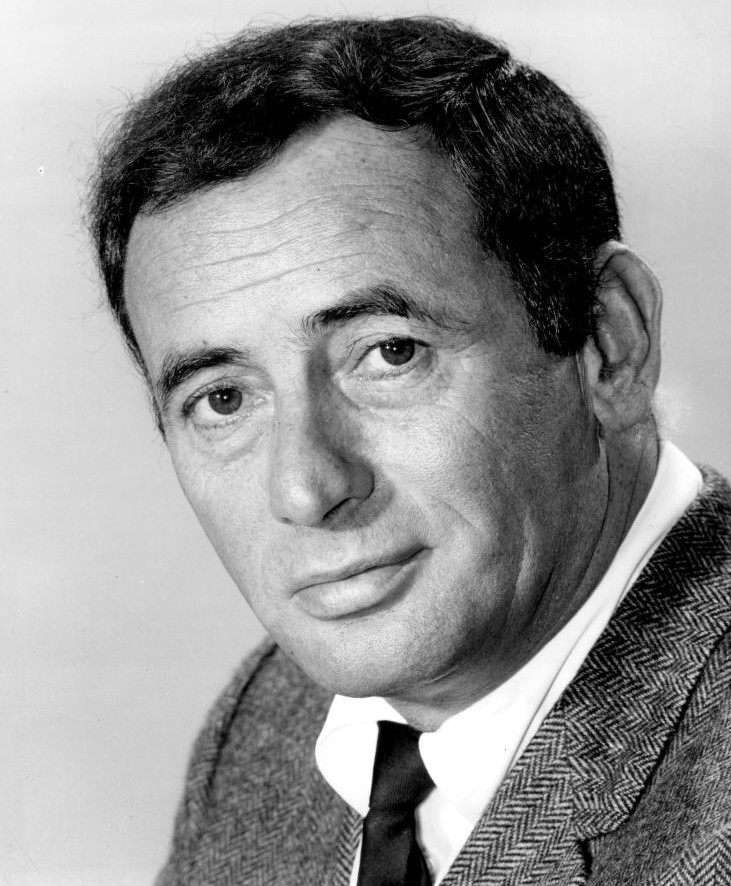
Joey Bishop

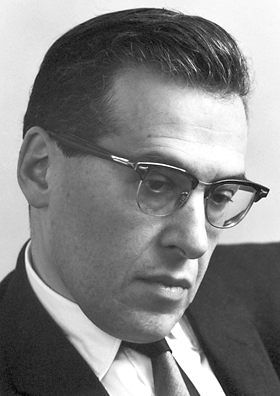
Julian Schwinger

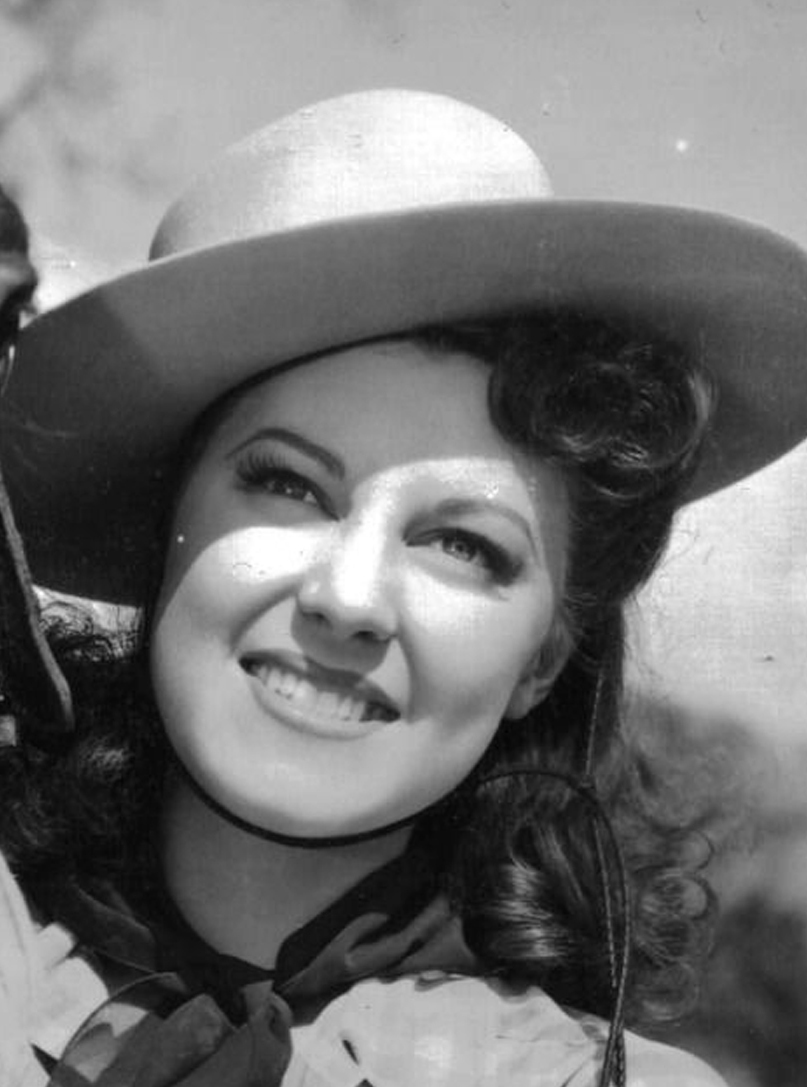
Fay McKenzie

- February 3
  - Millie Bailey, World War II veteran and civil servant (d. 2022)
  - Joey Bishop, American entertainer, member of the "Rat Pack" (d. 2007)
  - Martin Greenberg, American poet and translator (d. 2021)
  - Helen Stephens, American athlete (d. 1994)
- February 8
  - Fred Blassie, American professional wrestler, novelty singer (Pencil Neck Geek) (d. 2003)
  - Walter Newton Read, American lawyer and second chairman of the New Jersey Casino Control Commission (d. 2001)
- February 12 – Julian Schwinger, American physicist, Nobel Prize laureate (d. 1994)
- February 15
  - Allan Arbus, American actor (M*A*S*H) (d. 2013)
  - William T. Young, American businessman (d. 2004)
- February 16 – Patty Andrews, American singer (The Andrews Sisters) (d. 2013)
- February 17 – William Bronk, American poet (d. 1999)
- February 19 – Fay McKenzie, American silent film actress (d. 2019)
- February 21 – Robert E. Thacker, American aviator and test pilot (d. 2020)
- February 22
  - Charlie Finley, American businessman (d. 1996)
  - Don Pardo, American television announcer (Saturday Night Live) (d. 2014)
  - Robert Pershing Wadlow, American tallest man record-holder (d. 1940)
- February 25
  - Barney Ewell, athlete (d. 1996)
  - Bobby Riggs, tennis player (d. 1995)
- February 26
  - Otis R. Bowen, politician (d. 2013)
  - Theodore Sturgeon, writer (d. 1985)

=== March ===
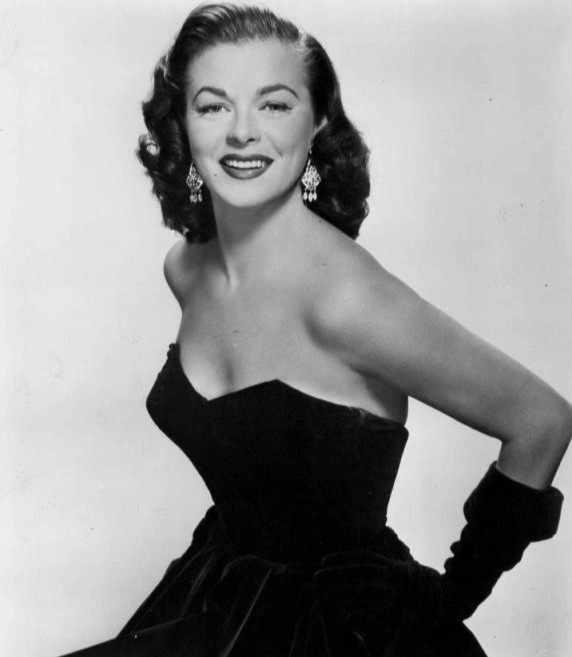
Marguerite Chapman

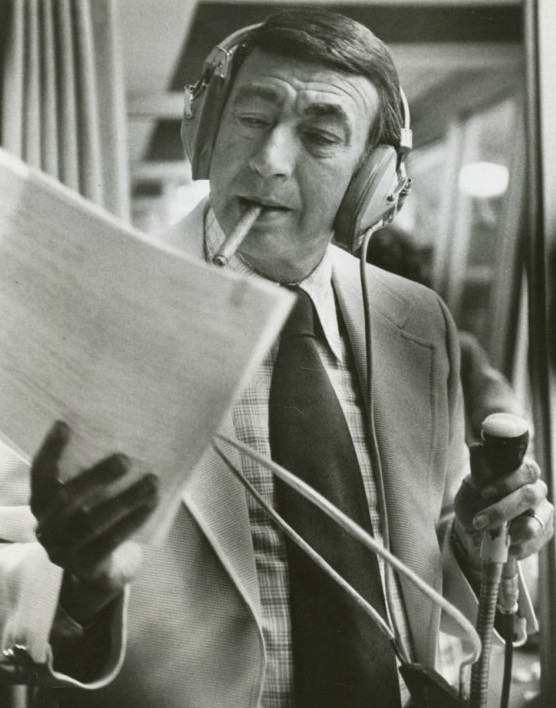
Howard Cosell

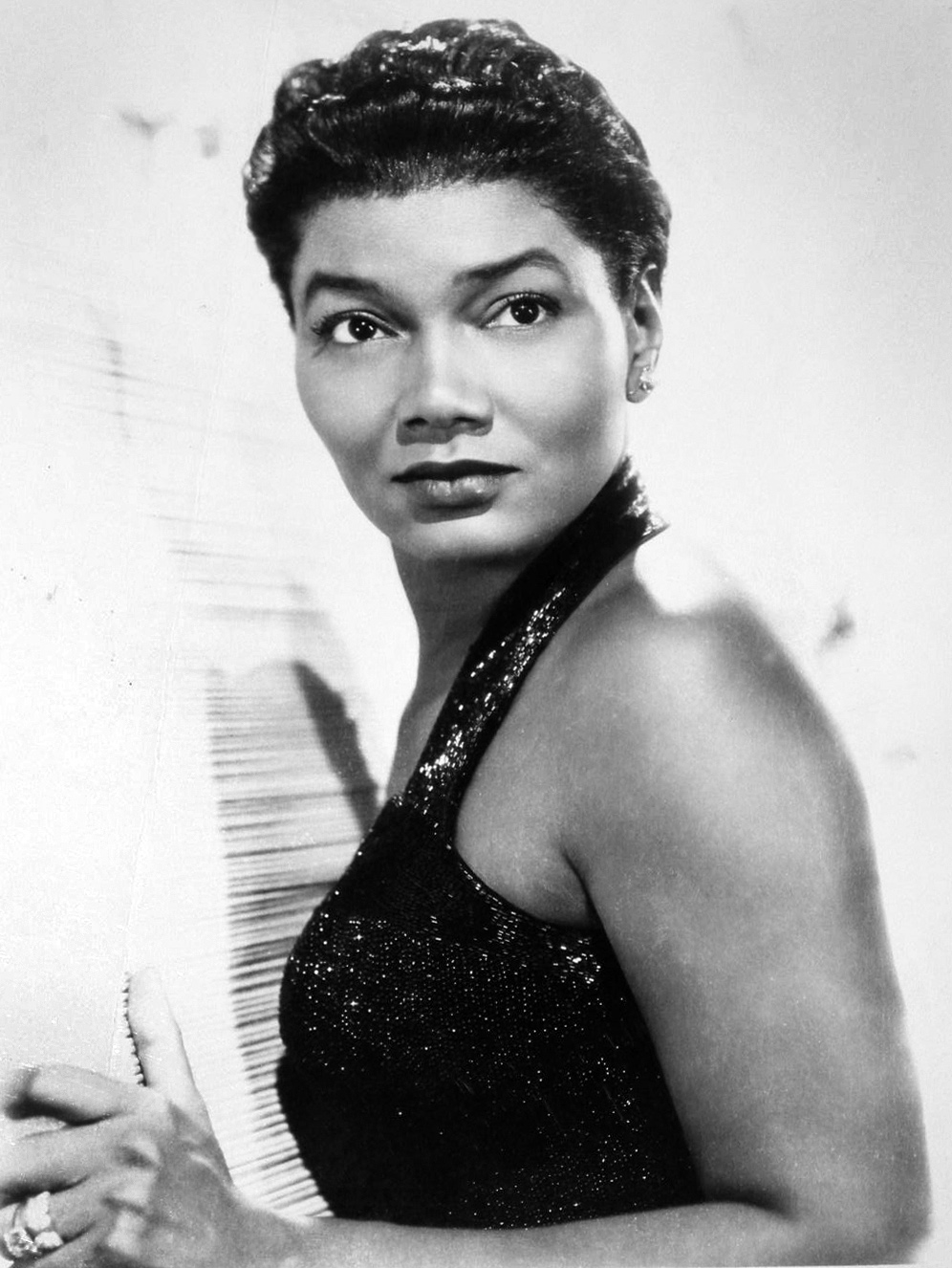
Pearl Bailey

- March 1 – James N. Morgan, economist (d. 2018)
- March 3 – Arthur Kornberg, biochemist, recipient of the Nobel Prize in Physiology or Medicine (d. 2007)
- March 4 – Margaret Osborne duPont, American female tennis player (d. 2012)
- March 5 – James Tobin, American economist, Nobel Prize laureate (d. 2002)
- March 8 – Mendel L. Peterson, American underwater archaeologist (d. 2003)
- March 9
  - Marguerite Chapman, American actress (d. 1999)
  - George Lincoln Rockwell, American Nazi leader (d. 1967)
  - Mickey Spillane, American writer (d. 2006)
- March 11 – Jack Coe, American evangelist (d. 1956)
- March 12 – Elaine de Kooning, American artist (d. 1989)
- March 13 – Eddie Pellagrini, American baseball player, coach (d. 2006)
- March 15 – Richard Ellmann, American literary biographer (d. 1987)
- March 16 – Frederick Reines, American physicist, winner of Nobel Prize in Physics in 1995 (d. 1998)
- March 17 – Ross Bass, American politician (d. 1993)
- March 18 – Bob Broeg, American sports writer (d. 2005)
- March 20 – Jack Barry, American television game show host, producer (d. 1984)
- March 23
  - Helene Hale, American politician (d. 2013)
  - Stick McGhee, American jump blues singer, guitarist, and songwriter (d. 1961)
- March 25 – Howard Cosell, American attorney, lecturer, and sports journalist (d. 1995)
- March 26 – Lloyd McCuiston, American politician
- March 28 – Alberto Valdés, American artist (d. 1998)
- March 29
  - Pearl Bailey, African-American singer, actress (d. 1990)
  - Shirley Jameson, American female baseball player (d. 1993)
  - Sam Walton, founder of Wal-Mart (d. 1992)

=== April ===
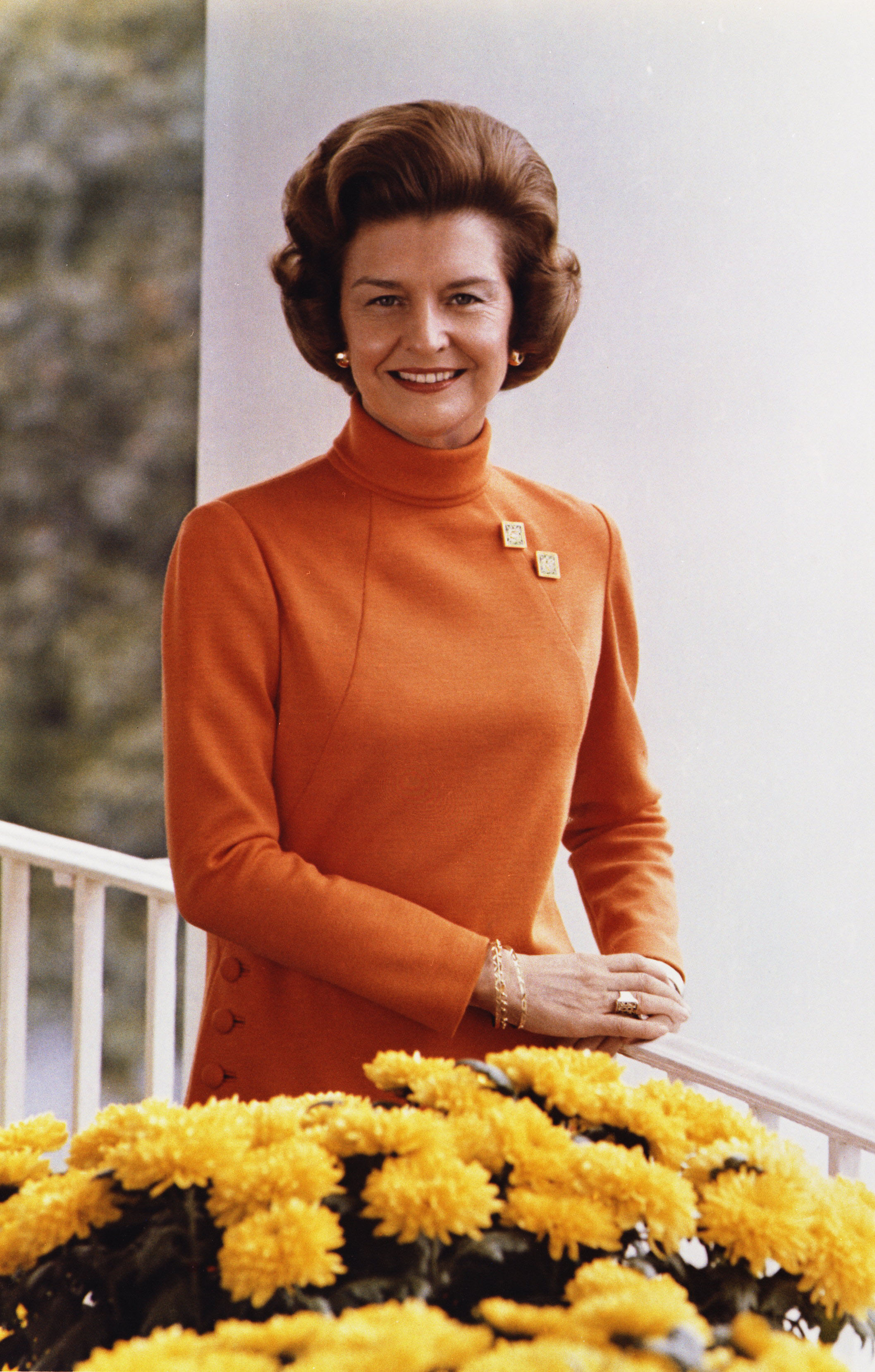
Betty Ford

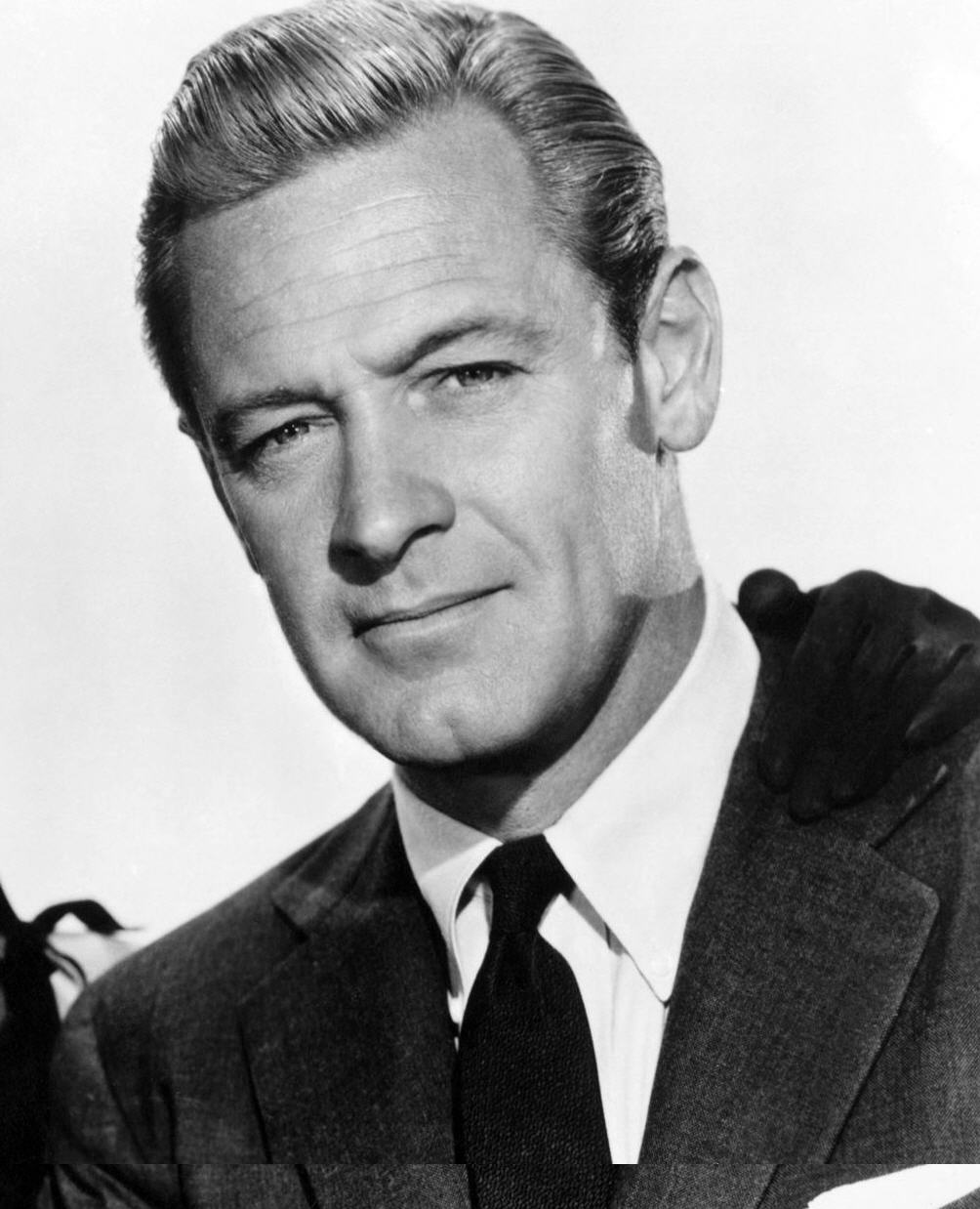
William Holden

- April 1 – Milt Earnhart, American politician (d. 2020)
- April 4 – Joseph Ashbrook, American astronomer (d. 1980)
- April 7 – Bobby Doerr, American baseball player (d. 2017)
- April 8
  - Betty Ford, First Lady of the United States, Second Lady of the United States (d. 2011)
  - Charles P. Roland, American historian (d. 2022)
- April 14 – Mary Healy, American actress, variety entertainer and singer (d. 2015)
- April 15
  - Louis O. Coxe, writer (d. 1993)
  - Edmund Jones, politician (d. 2019)
- April 17
  - William Holden, actor (d. 1981)
  - Anne Shirley, actress (d. 1993)
- April 18 – Clifton Hillegass, author, founder of CliffsNotes (d. 2001)
- April 20 – Edward L. Beach Jr., naval captain and author (d. 2002)
- April 22
  - Mickey Vernon, baseball player (d. 2008)
  - William Jay Smith, American poet (d. 2015)
- April 24 – Lou Dorfsman, graphic designer (d. 2008)
- April 27 – John Rice, baseball umpire (d. 2011)
- April 28
  - Mildred Persinger, feminist (d. 2018)
  - Rodger Young, United States Army soldier, remembered in the song "The Ballad of Rodger Young" (d. 1943)
- April 29 – George Allen, American football coach (d. 1990)

=== May ===
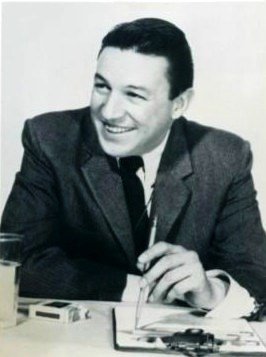
Mike Wallace

Richard Feynman

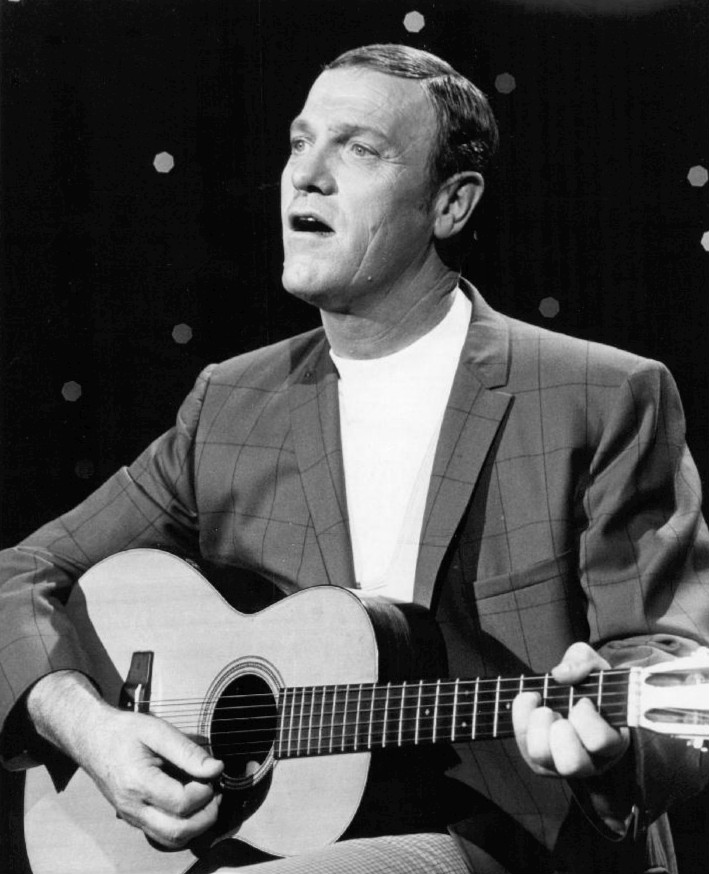
Eddy Arnold

- May 1 – Jack Paar, American television show host (The Tonight Show) (d. 2004)
- May 3 – Richard Dudman, American reporter, editorial writer (St. Louis Post-Dispatch) (d. 2017)
- May 9
  - Russell M. Carneal, American politician, judge (d. 1998)
  - Orville Freeman, American politician (d. 2003)
  - Mike Wallace, American journalist (d. 2012)
- May 10
  - T. Berry Brazelton, American pediatrician (d. 2018)
  - Jane Mayhall, American poet and novelist (d. 2009)
  - George Welch, U.S. soldier and pilot (d. 1954)
- May 11
  - Richard Feynman, American physicist, winner of Nobel Prize in Physics in 1965 (d. 1988)
  - Phil Rasmussen, pilot (d. 2005)
- May 12 – Julius Rosenberg, American-born Soviet spy (d. 1953)
- May 15 – Eddy Arnold, country singer (d. 2008)
- May 17 – A. C. Lyles, film producer (d. 2013)
- May 18
  - Claudia Bryar, actress (d. 2011)
  - Joe Krush, illustrator (d. 2022)
- May 20 – Edward B. Lewis, geneticist, recipient of the Nobel Prize in Physiology or Medicine (d. 2004)
- May 21 – Lloyd Hartman Elliott, educator, president of George Washington University (d. 2013)
- May 23
  - Frank Mancuso, major league baseball player, politician (d. 2007)
  - Naomi Replansky, poet (d. 2023)

=== June ===
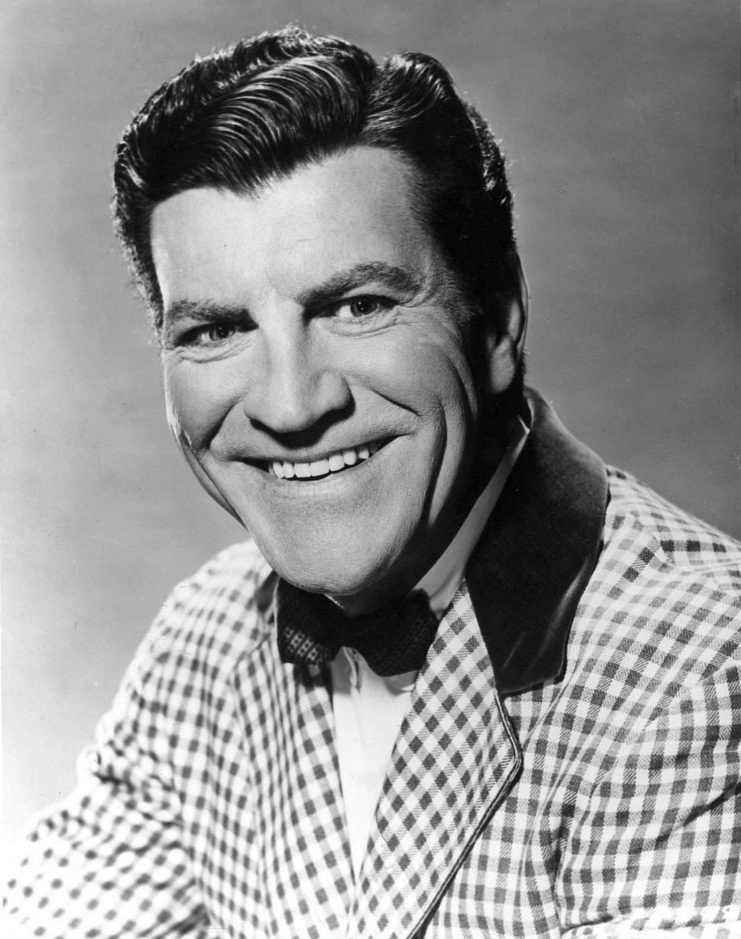
Robert Preston

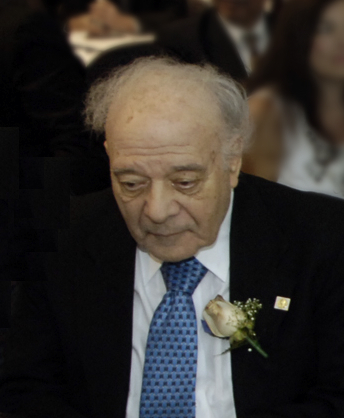
Jerome Karle

- June 2 – Kathryn Tucker Windham, writer, storyteller (d. 2011)
- June 4 – Johnny Klein, drummer (d. 1997)
- June 6 – Edwin G. Krebs, biochemist, winner of Nobel Prize in Physiology or Medicine in 1992 (d. 2009)
- June 8
  - Robert Preston, actor and singer (d. 1987)
  - John D. Roberts, chemist and academic (d. 2016)
  - John H. Ross, pilot (d. 2013)
- June 9 – John Hospers, philosopher (d. 2011)
- June 10 – Wood Moy, actor (d. 2017)
- June 12
  - Samuel Z. Arkoff, film producer (d. 2001)
  - Georgia Louise Harris Brown, architect (d. 1999)
  - Jerry A. Moore Jr., politician (d. 2017)
- June 13 – Wendell "Bud" Hurlbut, Theme park creator and entrepreneur (d. 2011)
- June 18
  - Jerome Karle, chemist, Nobel Prize laureate (d. 2013)
  - Lillian Ross, journalist on The New Yorker (d. 2017)
  - Elisabeth Waldo, violinist and composer (d. 2026)
- June 21
  - Dee Molenaar, mountaineer, author and artist (d. 2020)
  - Robert V. Roosa, American economist and banker (d. 1993)
  - Josephine Webb, engineer (d. 2017)
- June 25 – Sid Tepper, songwriter (d. 2015)
- June 26 – Raleigh Rhodes, combat fighter pilot (d. 2007)
- June 27 – Adolph Kiefer, Olympic champion swimmer (d. 2017)
- June 28 – Marshall Brown, professional basketball player (d. 2008)
- June 29
  - Gene La Rocque, U.S. admiral (d. 2016)
  - Francis W. Nye, United States Air Force major general (d. 2019)

=== July ===
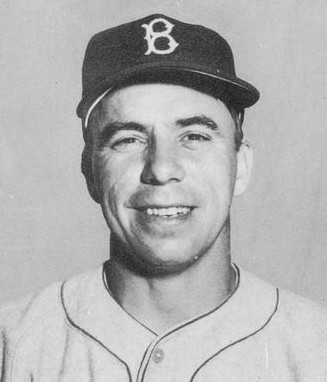
Pee Wee Reese

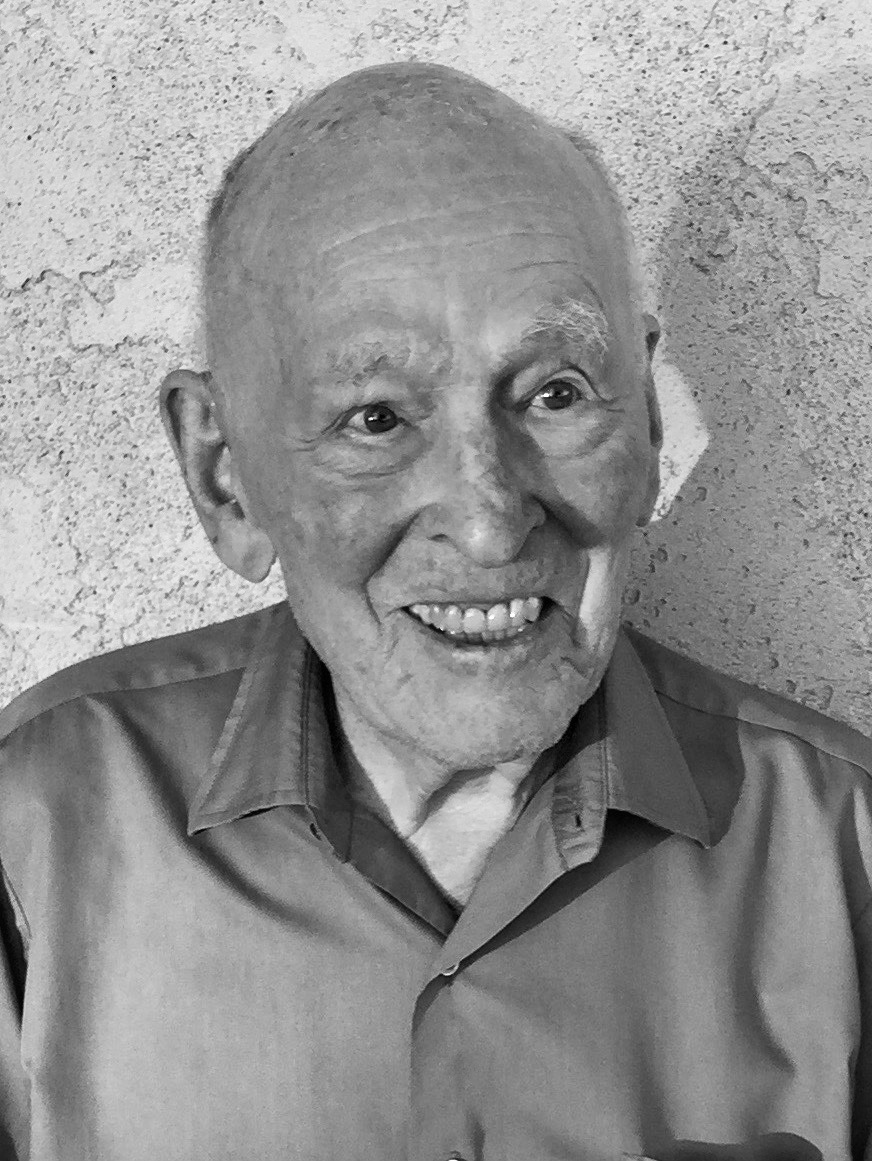
Paul D. Boyer

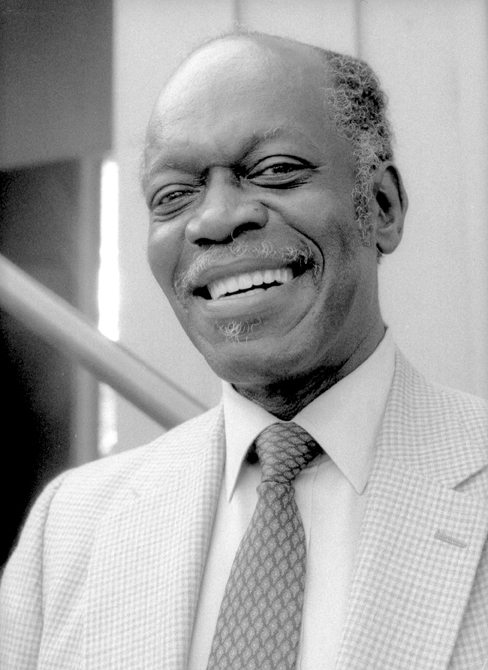
Hank Jones

- July 1 – Ralph Young, American singer, actor (d. 2008)
- July 3
  - Johnny Palmer, American golfer (d. 2006)
  - Shirley Adelson Siegel, American activist and lawyer (d. 2020)
  - Ben Thompson, American architect and designer (d. 2002)
- July 4
  - Joe Fortunato, American football, basketball, and baseball coach (d. 2004)
  - Eppie Lederer, American journalist and radio host (d. 2002)
  - Johnnie Parsons, American race car driver (d. 1984)
  - Pauline Phillips, American journalist and radio host, creator of Dear Abby (d. 2013)
- July 5 – George Rochberg, American composer (d. 2005)
- July 6
  - J. Dewey Daane, American economist (d. 2017)
  - Herm Fuetsch, American professional basketball player (d. 2010)
- July 7 – Bob Vanatta, American head basketball coach (d. 2016)
- July 8
  - Edward B. Giller, U.S. major general (d. 2017)
  - Bela E. Kennedy, American politician (d. 2008)
  - Craig Stevens, American actor (d. 2000)
  - Paul B. Fay, American businessman, soldier, and diplomat, 12th United States Secretary of the Navy (d. 2009)
- July 10
  - Chuck Stevens, American major baseball (d. 2018)
  - Frank L. Lambert, American professor emeritus of chemistry at Occidental College (d. 2018)
- July 12
  - Doris Grumbach, American novelist, memoirist, biographer, literary critic, and essayist (d. 2022)
  - Alice Van-Springsteen, American stuntwoman, jockey (d. 2008)
  - Vivian Mason, actress (d. 2009)
  - Paul Stenn, American football offensive tackle (d. 2003)
- July 14
  - Jay Wright Forrester, computer engineer, systems scientist (d. 2016)
  - Arthur Laurents, novelist and screenwriter (d. 2011)
- July 16 – Leonard T. Schroeder, colonel (d. 2009)
- July 17 – Chandler Robbins, ornithologist (d. 2017)
- July 18
  - James Duesenberry, economist (d. 2009)
  - Warren Hair, professional basketball player (d. 2006)
- July 20
  - Edward S. Little, diplomat (d. 2004)
  - Cindy Walker, songwriter, country singer (d. 2006)
- July 22 – Stanley Lebergott, government economist (d. 2009)
- July 23
  - Carl T. Langford, politician (d. 2011)
  - Pee Wee Reese, baseball player (d. 1999)
- July 24
  - Irving London, hematologist and geneticist (d. 2018)
  - Ruggiero Ricci, violinist (d. 2012)
- July 25 – Jane Frank, artist (d. 1986)
- July 26 – Marjorie Lord, actress (d. 2015)
- July 27 – Leonard Rose, cellist (d. 1984)
- July 29 – Edwin O'Connor, novelist, Pulitzer Prize for Fiction winner (d. 1968)
- July 30
  - John L. Cason, actor (d. 1961)
  - Jimmy Robinson, actor (d. 1967)
- July 31
  - Paul D. Boyer, chemist, Nobel Prize laureate (d. 2018)
  - Hank Jones, pianist (d. 2010)

=== August ===
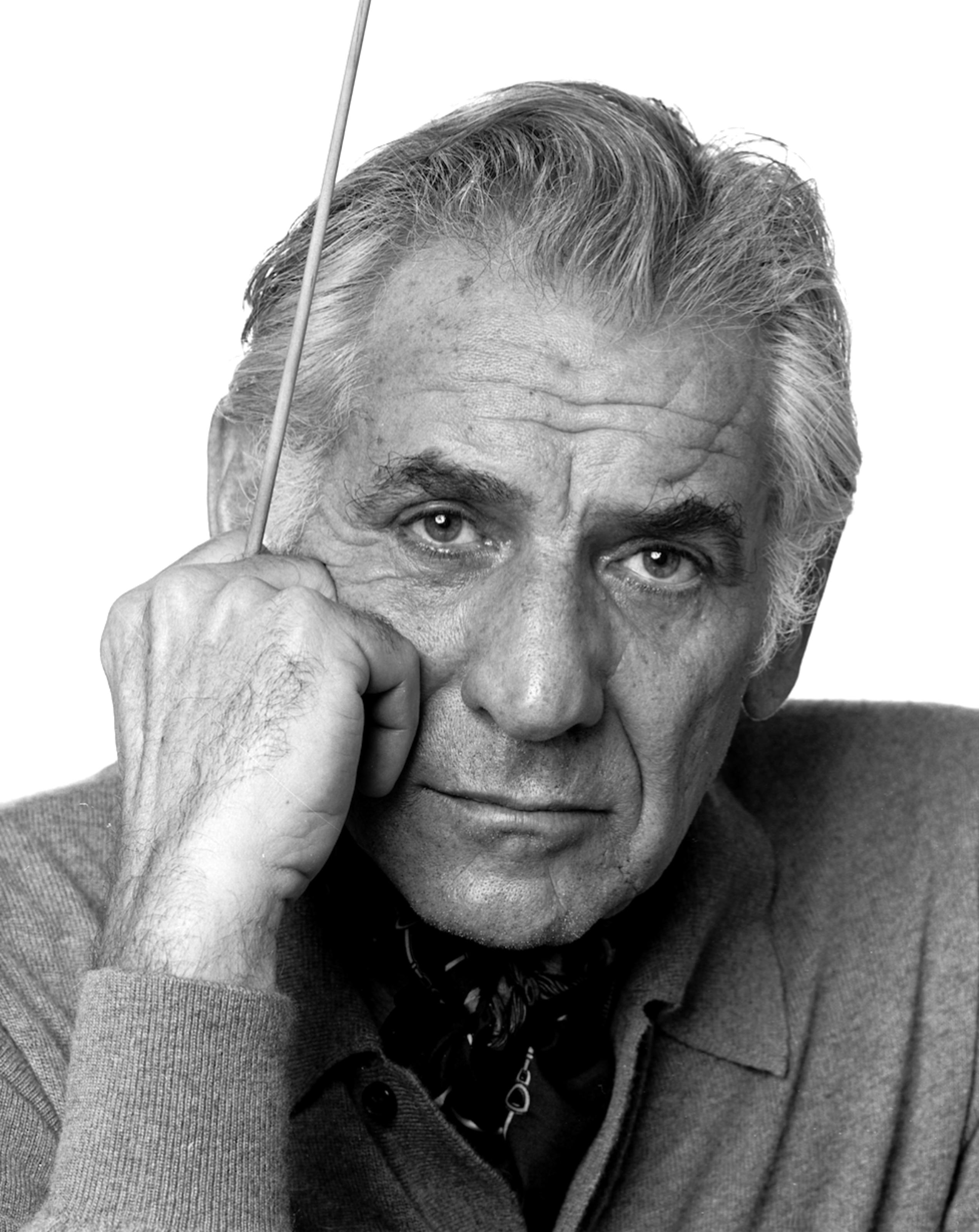
Leonard Bernstein

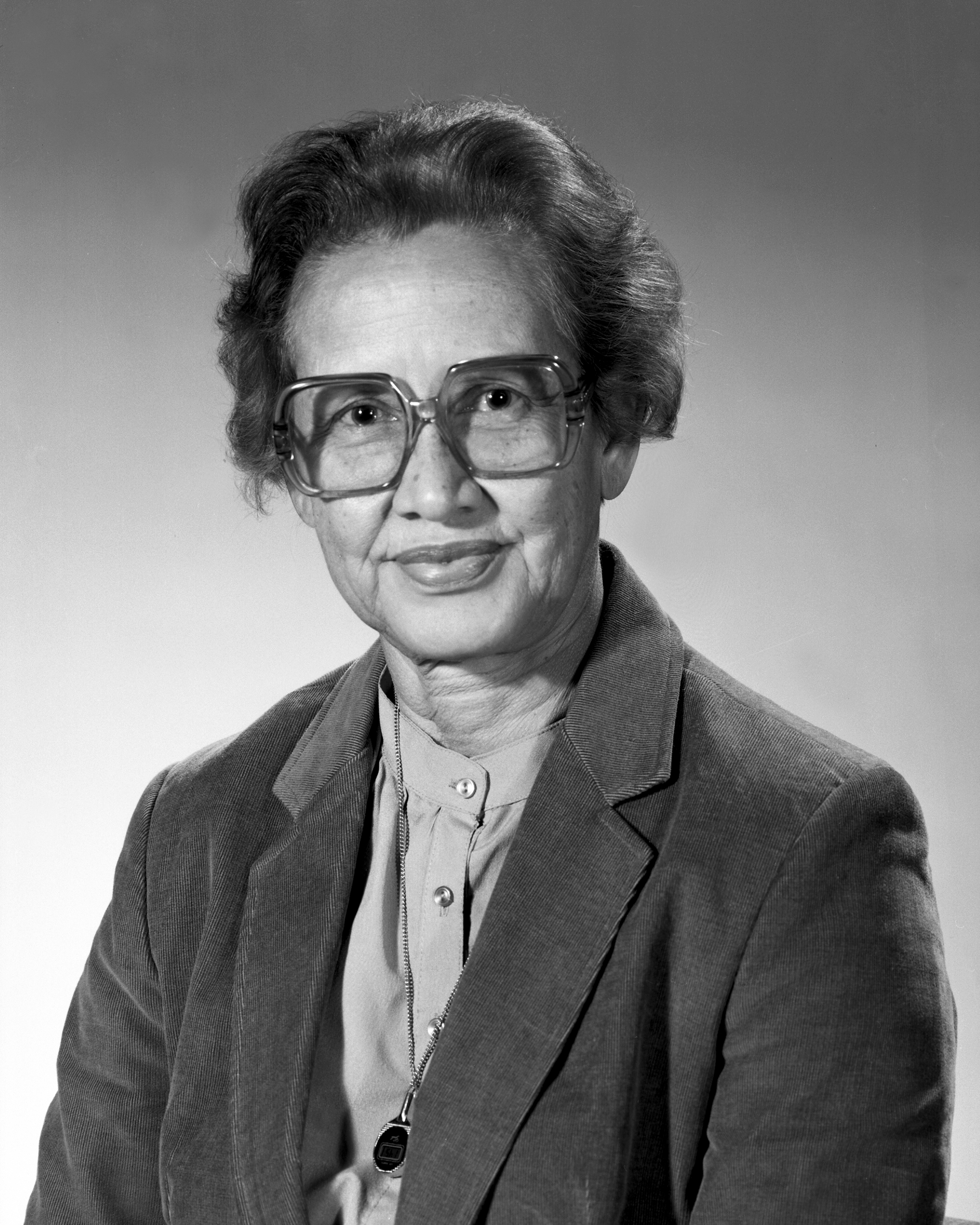
Katherine Johnson

- August 3 – Sidney Gottlieb, American Central Intelligence Agency official (d. 1999)
- August 6 – Charles Coulston Gillispie, American historian (d. 2015)
- August 9 – Robert Aldrich, American writer and filmmaker (d. 1983)
- August 12 – Roy C. Bennett, American songwriter (d. 2015)
- August 13 – Tao Porchon-Lynch, American yoga master and author (d. 2020)
- August 19 – Oliver Brown, African-American plaintiff (d. 1961)
- August 20 – Jacqueline Susann, American novelist (d. 1974)
- August 21 – Bruria Kaufman, American-born Israeli physicist (d. 2010 in Israel)
- August 22 – Martin Pope, American physical chemist (d. 2022)
- August 23 – Bernard Fisher, American surgeon (d. 2019)
- August 25 – Leonard Bernstein, American composer and conductor (d. 1990)
- August 26
  - Hutton Gibson, American religion writer, father of actor Mel Gibson (d. 2020)
  - Katherine Johnson, African-American physicist and mathematician (d. 2020)
- August 27 – Simeon Booker, American journalist (d. 2017)
- August 30 – Ted Williams, American baseball player (d. 2002)
- August 31
  - Griffin Bell, American politician (d. 2009)
  - Alan Jay Lerner, American lyricist (d. 1986)
  - Kenny Washington, African-American football player (d. 1971)

=== September ===
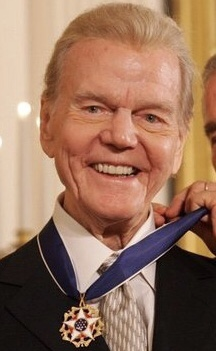
Paul Harvey

- September 1 – James D. Martin, American politician (d. 2017)
- September 3 – Helen Wagner, American soap opera actress (d. 2010)
- September 4
  - Paul Harvey, American radio broadcaster (d. 2009)
  - Gerald Wilson, American jazz trumpeter (d. 2014)
- September 5 - Fred McCarthy, cartoonist (d. 2009)
- September 6 – Hugh Gillis, American politician (d. 2013)
- September 13
  - Ray Charles, American musician, singer and songwriter (d. 2015)
  - Rosemary Kennedy, sister of John F. Kennedy (d. 2005)
- September 15 – Nipsey Russell, African-American comedian (d. 2005)
- September 19 – Joseph Zeller, American politician (d. 2018)
- September 21 – John Gofman, American Manhattan Project scientist, advocate (d. 2007)
- September 26
  - Harry Yee, bartender (d. 2022)
  - John Zacherle, television and radio host, singer, and voice actor (d. 2016)
- September 28 – Arnold Stang, comic actor (d. 2009)

=== October ===
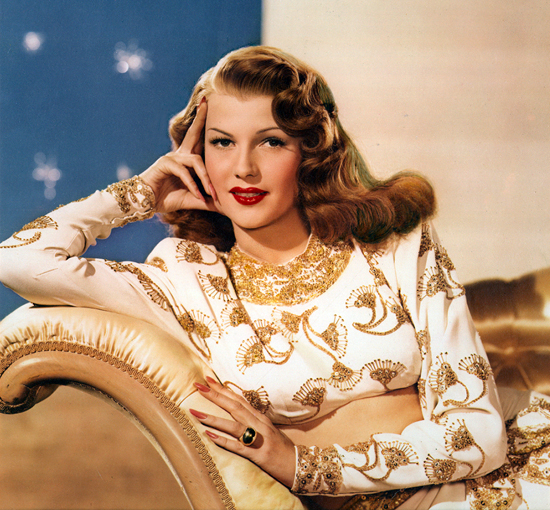
Rita Hayworth

- October 4 – Adrian Kantrowitz, American cardiac surgeon (d. 2008)
- October 9 – E. Howard Hunt, American Watergate break-in coordinator (d. 2007)
- October 13 – Robert Walker, American actor (d. 1951)
- October 17 – Rita Hayworth, American actress (d. 1987)
- October 18 – Bobby Troup, American singer-songwriter and actor, known for his role in Emergency! (d. 1999)
- October 19 – Robert S. Strauss, American politician, Democratic National Committee Chairman (d. 2014)
- October 22 – Fred Caligiuri, American baseball player (d. 2018)
- October 23
  - Augusta Dabney, American actress (d. 2008)
  - Paul Rudolph, American architect (d. 1997)
- October 25 – Milton Selzer, American actor (d. 2006)
- October 27 – Teresa Wright, American actress (d. 2005)
- October 29 – Diana Serra Cary, born Peggy-Jean Montgomery ("Baby Peggy"), American silent film child actress (d. 2020)
- October 31 – Ian Stevenson, American parapsychologist (d. 2007)

=== November ===
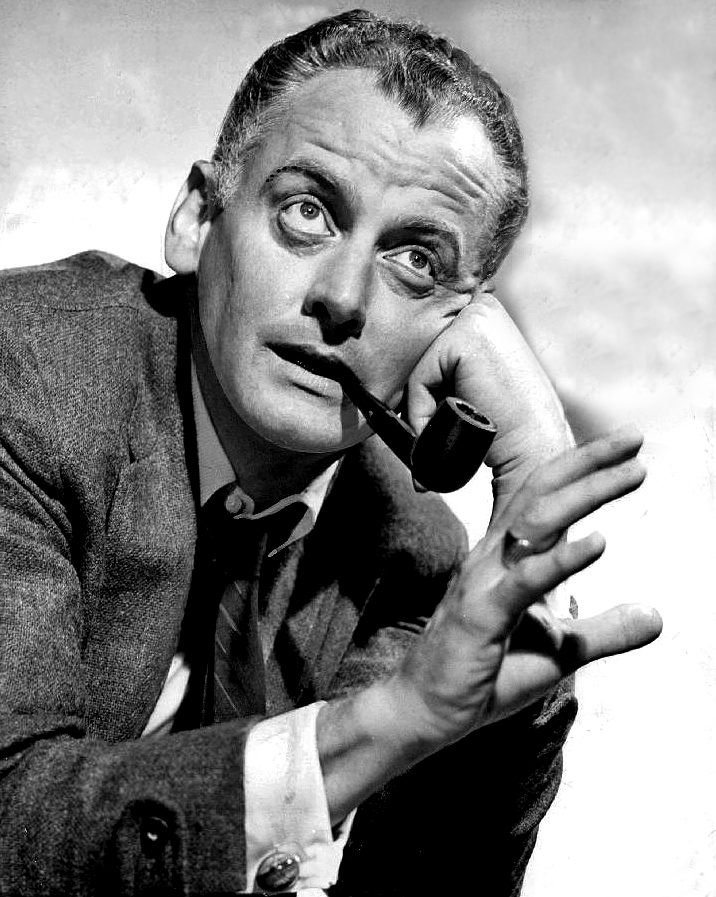
Art Carney

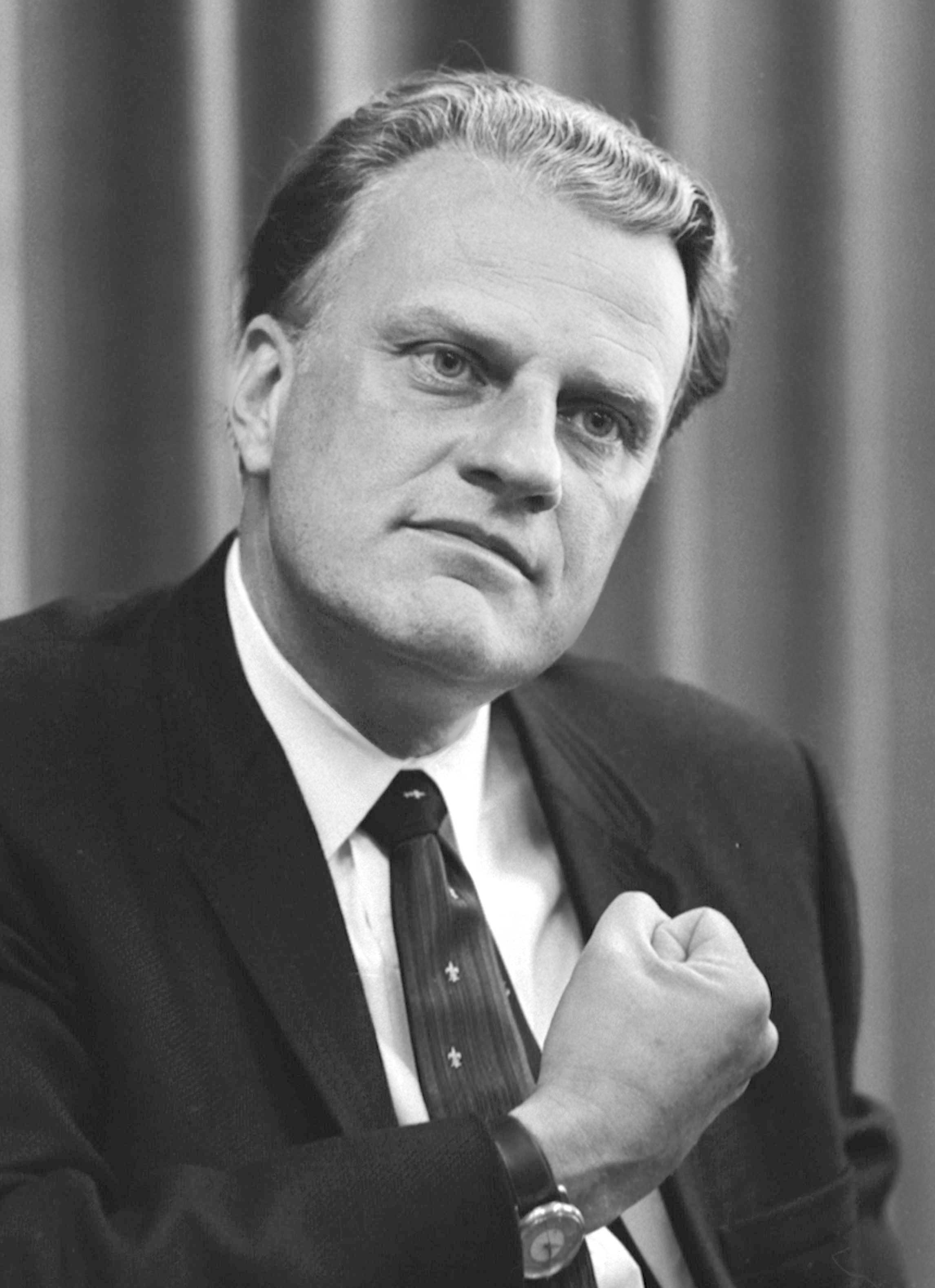
Billy Graham

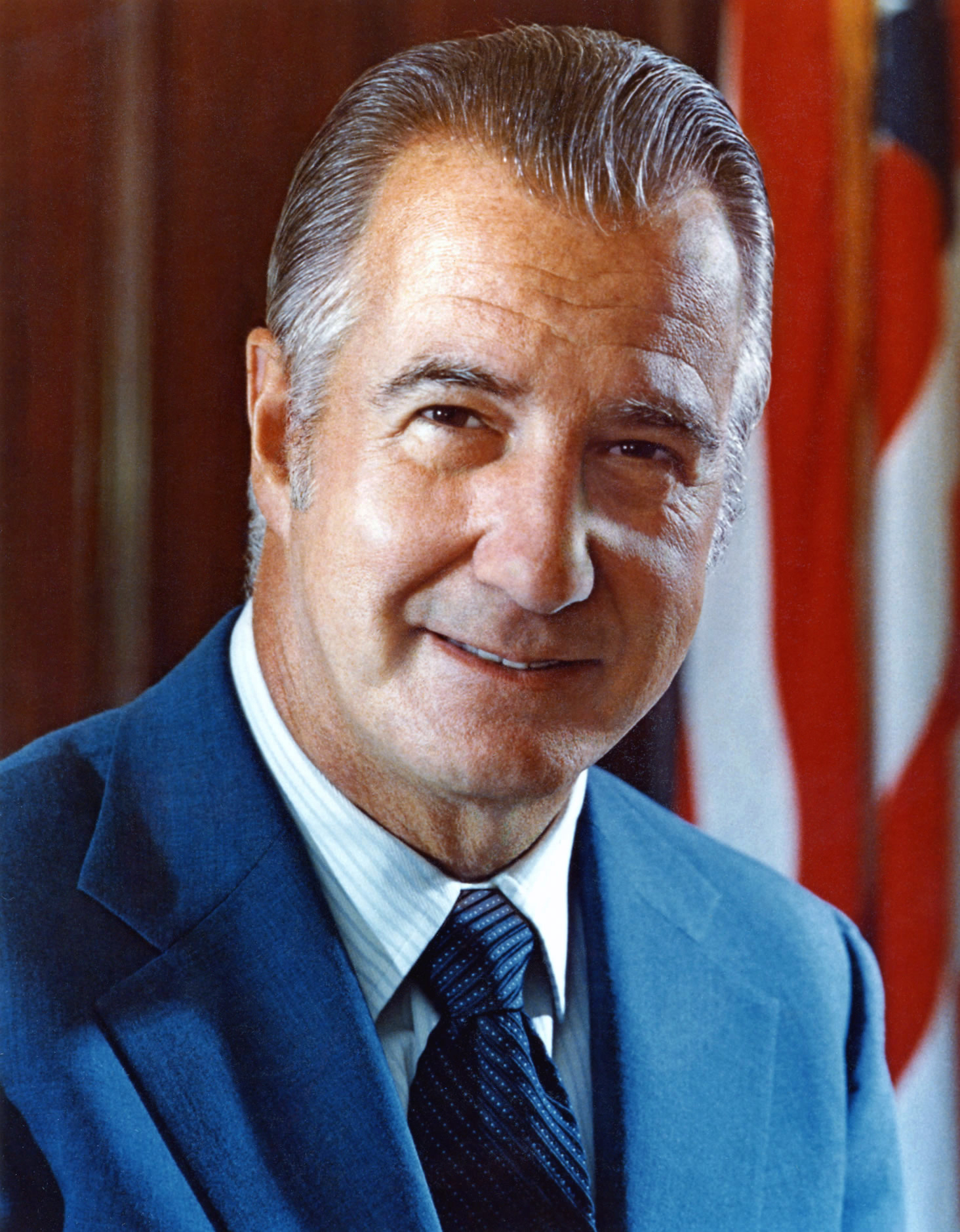
Spiro Agnew

- November 3
  - Bob Feller, American baseball player (d. 2010)
  - Ann Hutchinson Guest, American movement, dance researcher (d. 2022)
  - Elizabeth P. Hoisington, American Brigadier General (d. 2007)
  - Russell B. Long, United States Senator from Louisiana (d. 2003)
  - Dean Riesner, American film, television screenwriter (d. 2002)
- November 4
  - Art Carney, American actor, best known for his role in The Honeymooners (d. 2003)
  - Cameron Mitchell, American actor, best known for his role in The High Chaparral (d. 1994)
- November 7
  - Fred Cusick, American ice hockey broadcaster (d. 2009)
  - Billy Graham, evangelist (d. 2018)
- November 8 – Bob Schiller, American screenwriter (d. 2017)
- November 9
  - Spiro Agnew, 39th vice president of the United States from 1969 to 1973 (d. 1996)
  - Thomas Ferebee, United States Air Force colonel (d. 2000)
- November 10 – John Henry Moss, American baseball executive, politician (d. 2009)
- November 11
  - Stubby Kaye, American actor and comedian (d. 1997)
  - Louise Tobin, American singer (d. 2022)
- November 21 – Dorothy Maguire, American professional baseball player (d. 1981)
- November 28 – Jack H. Harris, American film producer, distributor and actor (d. 2017)
- November 29 – Madeleine L'Engle, children's fiction writer (d. 2007)
- November 30 – Efrem Zimbalist, Jr., American actor (d. 2014)

=== December ===
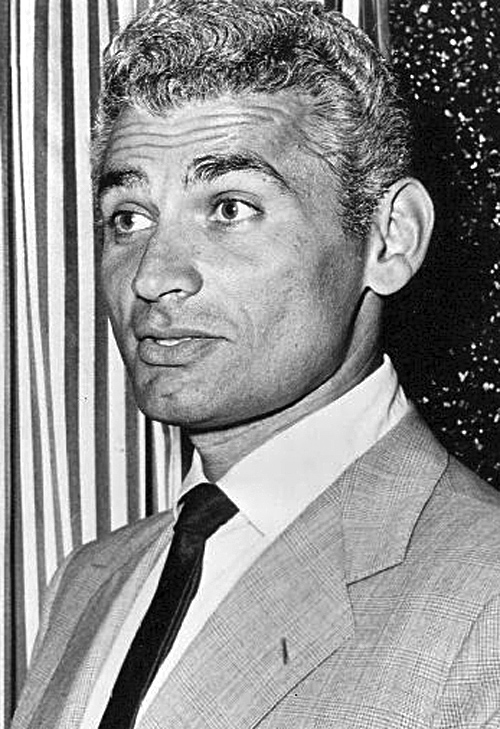
Jeff Chandler

- December 6 – Nick Drahos, American football player (d. 2018)
- December 10 – Anne Gwynne, American actress (d. 2003)
- December 11 – John W. Reed, American legal scholar (d. 2018)
- December 12 – Joe Williams, American jazz singer (d. 1999)
- December 14 – Jack Cole, American cartoonist (d. 1958)
- December 15 – Jeff Chandler, American actor (d. 1961)
- December 17 – Dusty Anderson, American actress and model (d. 2007)
- December 18 – Hal Kanter, American comedy writer, producer and director (d. 2011)
- December 20 – Joseph Payne Brennan, poet and author (d. 1990 in the United States1990)
- December 21
  - Fred Gloden, American football player (d. 2019)
  - Donald Regan, American Treasury Secretary, White House Chief of Staff (d. 2003)
- December 24 – Dave Bartholomew, American musician, bandleader, composer and arranger (d. 2019)
- December 25
  - Henry Hillman, American businessman and philanthropist (d. 2017)
  - George S. Vest, American diplomat (d. 2021)
- December 26 – Butch Ballard, American jazz drummer (d. 2011)
- December 29 – Leo J. Dulacki, American general (d. 2019)
- December 31
  - Al Lakeman, Major League Baseball catcher (d. 1976)
  - Kyra Petrovskaya Wayne, Russian-American author (d. 2018)

=== Undated ===
- Nat Jaffe, swing jazz pianist (d. 1945)
- Sol Malkoff, calligrapher and designer (d. 2001)

== Deaths ==
- January 8 – Ellis H. Roberts, politician (born 1827)
- January 14 – Kate J. Brainard, music teacher
- February 2 – John L. Sullivan, boxer, World Heavyweight Champion (born 1858)
- February 4 – Jeannette Walworth, American journalist and novelist (born 1835)
- February 7 – Effie Hoffman Rogers, educator, editor and journalist (born 1835/37)
- February 9 – E. J. Richmond, litterateur and author (born 1825)
- February 15 – Vernon Castle, ballroom dancer (born 1887)
- March 10 – Jim McCormick, baseball pitcher (born 1856 in Scotland)
- March 14 – Lucretia Garfield, First Lady of the United States (born 1832)
- March 16 – Prosper P. Parker, civil engineer, Union Army officer and politician (born 1835 in Canada)
- March 27 – Henry Adams, historian (born 1838)
- April 14 – James E. Ware, architect who devised the "dumbbell plan" for New York City tenements (born 1846)
- May 1 – Grove Karl Gilbert, geologist (born 1843)
- May 5 – Bertha Palmer, businesswoman, socialite and philanthropist (born 1849)
- May 14 – James Gordon Bennett, Jr., newspaper publisher (born 1841)
- May 17 – William Drew Robeson, African American Presbyterian minister, escaped slave and father of Paul Robeson (born 1844)
- May 19 – Raoul Lufbery, fighter pilot (killed in action; born 1885 in France)
- May 27 – Frederick Trump, German American businessman, paternal grandfather of Donald Trump (born 1869)
- June 4 – Charles W. Fairbanks, 26th vice president of the United States from 1905 to 1909 and U.S. Senator from Indiana from 1897 to 1905 (born 1852)
- June 18 – Lizzie Halliday, serial killer (born c.1859)
- June 25 – Jake Beckley, baseball player (born 1867)
- June 27 – George Mary Searle, astronomer (born 1839)
- June 28 – Albert Henry Munsell, inventor of the Munsell color system (born 1858)
- July 20 – Francis Lupo, U.S. Army soldier (killed in action; born 1895)
- July 22 – Roy Earl Parrish, American politician (killed in action; born 1888)
- July 27 – Gustav Kobbé, music critic and author (sailing accident; born 1857)
- July 30 – Joyce Kilmer, poet (killed in action; born 1886)
- August 1 – John Riley Banister, policeman and cowboy (born 1854)
- August 10 – William Pitt Kellogg, U.S. Senator from Louisiana from 1868 to 1872 and from 1877 to 1883 (born 1830)
- August 12 – Anna Held, singer (born 1872 in Poland)
- August 14 – Anna Morton, Second Lady of the United States (born 1846)
- August 24 – Louis Bennett Jr., World War I flying ace (killed in action) (b. 1894)
- September 12 – Joseph Clay Stiles Blackburn, U.S. Senator from Kentucky from 1885 to 1897 and from 1901 to 1907 (born 1838)
- September 28
  - True Boardman, silent film actor (born 1882)
  - Freddie Stowers, African American corporal (killed in action; born 1896)
- September 29 – Frank Luke, fighter pilot (killed in action; born 1897)
- October 8 – James B. McCreary, 27th and 37th Governor of Kentucky from 1875 to 1879 and from 1911 to 1915, U.S. Senator from Kentucky from 1903 to 1909 (born 1838)
- October 16 – Felix Arndt, pianist and composer (born 1889)
- October 19 – Harold Lockwood, silent film actor (born 1887)
- October 21
  - Wesley Newcomb Hohfeld, professor of jurisprudence (born 1879)
  - Jennie O. Starkey, journalist (born ca. 1856)
- October 22 – Myrtle Gonzalez, silent film actress (born 1891)
- October 28 – Edward Bouchet, physicist (born 1852)
- November 4 – Andrew Dickson White, diplomat, academic and author (born 1832)
- November 19 – Joseph F. Smith, Mormon leader (born 1838)
- December – Sarah Jim Mayo, Washoe basket weaver (born 1858)
- December 17 – John Green Brady, 5th Governor of the District of Alaska from 1897 to 1906 (born 1847)
- December 26 – William Hampton Patton, entomologist (born 1853)

== See also ==
- List of American films of 1918
- Timeline of United States history (1900–1929)
