= Mankoff =

Mankoff is a surname. Notable people with the surname include:

- Bob Mankoff (born 1944), American cartoonist, editor, and author
- Doug Mankoff (21st century), film producer
- Jennifer Mankoff (21st century), American computer scientist

== See also ==
- Malkoff
