= King Cotton =

Slogan of the pre-Civil War American South

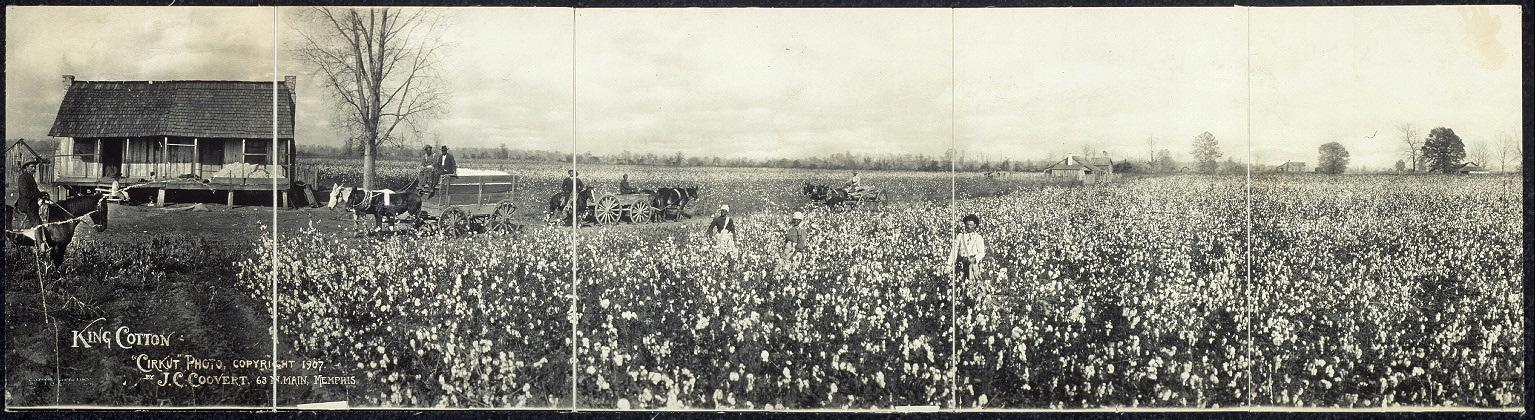
King Cotton, a panoramic photograph of a cotton plantation in 1907, now housed in the Library of Congress

"King Cotton" is a slogan that summarized the strategy used before the American Civil War (of 1861–1865) by secessionists in the southern states to claim the feasibility of secession and to prove there was no need to fear a war against the federal government. The theory held that control over cotton exports would make a proposed independent Confederacy economically prosperous, would ruin the textile industry of New England, and—most importantly—would force the United Kingdom and perhaps France to support the Confederacy militarily because their industrial economies depended on Southern cotton.

By 1861, many of the most powerful governments in the world had made commitments against slavery, and for this reason, the Confederacy realised that they had to use cotton as the "selling point" of their new republic and not slavery.

The emancipation of slaves in the West Indies and the general abolition of slavery was economically costly for Britain, and this was one of the reasons why southern secessionists believed that they had leverage to influence trading partners to provide diplomatic support and possibly intervention.

The slogan, widely adopted among planters in the South, helped in mobilizing support for secession: by February 1861, the seven states whose economies were based on cotton plantations had all seceded and formed the Confederacy. Meanwhile, the other eight slave states, with little or no cotton production, remained in the Union, though four of these states would also issue declarations of secession by that June.

To demonstrate the alleged power of King Cotton, in early 1861, Southern cotton planters spontaneously refused to ship out their cotton. In addition to holding back the export of cotton, in 1862, the Confederate Congress authorized the burning of cotton in circumstances where there was a danger of Union forces gaining territory.

By the summer of 1861, the US Navy blockaded every major port in the South and shut down over 95% of all trade. The British were able to acquire cotton from alternative locations such as India, Egypt and Brazil. Britain having recently abolished slavery throughout its empire, there was little public support for the government militarily supporting a rebellion to uphold the ideals of slavery. Consequently, the strategy proved a failure.

== History ==
The American South is known for its long, hot summers, and rich soils in river valleys, making it an ideal location for growing cotton. The many southern seaports and riverside docks allowed shipping cotton to remote destinations. By 1860, Southern plantations supplied 75% of the world's cotton, with shipments from Houston, New Orleans, Charleston, Mobile, Savannah, and a few other ports.

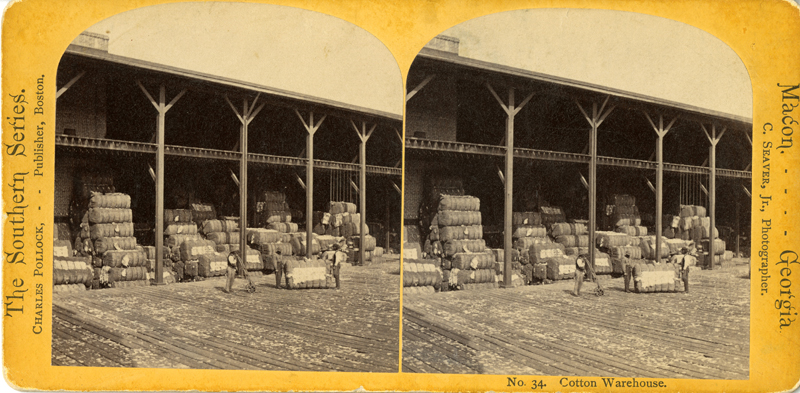
Adams & Bazemore Cotton Warehouse, Macon, Georgia, c. 1877

The insatiable European demand for cotton was a result of the Industrial Revolution which created the machinery and factories to process raw cotton into clothing that was better and cheaper than a handmade product. European and New England purchases soared from 720,000 bales in 1830 to 2.85 million bales in 1850, to nearly 5 million in 1860. Cotton production renewed demand for slavery after the tobacco market had declined in the late 18th century. The more cotton was grown, the more slaves were needed to harvest the crops. By 1860, on the eve of the American Civil War, cotton accounted for almost 60% of American exports, representing a total value of nearly $200 million (equivalent to approximately $5.68 billion in 2024) a year.

Cotton's central place in the national economy and its international importance led Senator James Henry Hammond of South Carolina to make a famous boast in 1858:

Without firing a gun, without drawing a sword, should they make war on us, we could bring the whole world to our feet ... What would happen if no cotton was furnished for three years? ... England would topple headlong and carry the whole civilized world with her, save the South. No, you dare not to make war on cotton. No power on the earth dares to make war upon it. Cotton is king.

Confederate leaders had made little effort to ascertain the views of European industrialists or diplomats until the Confederacy sent diplomats James Mason and John Slidell in November 1861. That led to a diplomatic blowup in the Trent Affair.

== British position ==
When war broke out, the Confederate people, acting spontaneously without government direction, held their cotton at home, watching prices soar and an economic crisis hit Britain and New England, causing a backlash with British public opinion. Around one quarter of the British population at the time depended on the cotton textile industry for their income, and so the nation needed ways to survive the South's cotton withholding without intervening, which meant having alternative access to raw cotton. Due to this reliance on the South's cotton, the South viewed Britain as jealous of the economic progression of the slave states, increasing tensions between the two. Even if Britain did intervene, it would mean war with the United States, as well as loss of the American market, loss of American grain supplies, risk to Canada, and much of the British merchant marine, all in the slim promise of getting more cotton. During the 19th century, Britain had tried to reduce their dependence on cotton produced in the American South, however, the success of these attempts were limited for a variety of reasons, such as transportation difficulties and costs.

In Britain there had been a much bigger anti-slavery movement, and therefore the prospect of supporting the American slave states was not ideal. Besides that, in the spring of 1861, warehouses in Europe were bulging with surplus cotton, which later soared in price. So the cotton interests made their profits without a war. The Union imposed a naval blockade, closing all Confederate ports to normal traffic; consequently, the South was unable to move 95% of its cotton. Yet, some cotton was slipped out by blockade runners, or through Mexico. Cotton diplomacy, advocated by the Confederate diplomats James M. Mason and John Slidell, completely failed because the Confederacy could not deliver its cotton, and the British economy was robust enough to absorb a depression in textiles from 1862–1864.

As Union armies moved into cotton regions of the South in 1862, the U.S. acquired all the cotton available, and sent it to Northern textile mills or sold it to Europe. Meanwhile, cotton production increased in British India by 70% and also increased in Egypt. Between 1860 and 1870, Brazilian annual cotton exports rose 400%, from 12,000 to 60,000 tonnes.

== Economics ==
When war broke out, the Confederates refused to allow the export of cotton to Europe. The idea was that this cotton diplomacy would force Europe to intervene. However, European states did not intervene, and following Abraham Lincoln's decision to impose a Union blockade, the South was unable to market its millions of bales of cotton. The production of cotton increased in other parts of the world, such as India and Egypt, to meet the demand, and new profits in cotton were among the motives of the Russian conquest of Central Asia. A British-owned newspaper, The Standard of Buenos Aires, in cooperation with the Manchester Cotton Supply Association succeeded in encouraging Argentinian farmers to greatly increase production of cotton in Argentina and export it to the United Kingdom.

David G Surdam (1998) asks, "Did the world demand for American-grown raw cotton fall during the 1860s, even though total demand for cotton increased?" Previous researchers have asserted that the South faced stagnating or falling demand for its cotton. Surdam's more complete model of the world market for cotton, combined with additional data, shows that the reduction in the supply of American-grown cotton induced by the Civil War distorts previous estimates of the state of demand for cotton. In the absence of the drastic disruption in the supply of American-grown cotton, the world demand for such cotton would have remained strong.

Stanley Lebergott (1983) shows the South blundered during the war because it clung too long to faith in King Cotton. Because the South's long-range goal was a world monopoly of cotton, it devoted valuable land and slave labor to growing cotton instead of urgently needed foodstuffs.

In the end, "King Cotton" proved to be a delusion that misled the Confederacy into a hopeless war that it ended up losing.

== See also ==
- Diplomacy of the American Civil War
- Cotton production in the United States
- Black Belt in the American South
- Origins of the American Civil War

== Bibliography ==
- Blumenthal, Henry. "Confederate Diplomacy: Popular Notions and International Realities." Journal of Southern History 1966 32(2): 151-171. ISSN 0022-4642 in Jstor
- Hubbard, Charles M. The Burden of Confederate Diplomacy (1998)
- Jones, Howard, Union in Peril: The Crisis over British Intervention in the Civil War (1992) online edition
- Lebergott, Stanley. "Why the South Lost: Commercial Purpose in the Confederacy, 1861-1865." Journal of American History 1983 70(1): 58-74. ISSN 0021-8723 in Jstor
- Lebergott, Stanley. "Through the Blockade: The Profitability and Extent of Cotton Smuggling, 1861–1865," The Journal of Economic History, Vol. 41, No. 4 (1981), pp. 867–888 in JSTOR
- Owsley, Frank Lawrence. King Cotton Diplomacy: Foreign relations of the Confederate States of America (1931, revised 1959) Continues to be the standard source; online review
  - Frank Lawrence Owsley, "The Confederacy and King Cotton: A Study in Economic Coercion," North Carolina Historical Review 6#4 (1929), pp. 371–397 in JSTOR; summary
- Scherer, James a.b. Cotton as a world power: a study in the economic interpretation of history (1916) online edition
- Surdam, David G. "King Cotton: Monarch or Pretender? The State of the Market for Raw Cotton on the Eve of the American Civil War." Economic History Review 1998 51(1): 113-132. in JSTOR
- Yafa, Stephen H. (2005). Big Cotton: How a Humble Fiber Created Fortunes, Wrecked Civilizations, and Put America on the Map. Viking. ISBN 978-0-670-03367-6. OCLC 56329432.
