= Malkoff =

Malkoff is a surname. Notable people with the surname include:

- Amy Malkoff, American singer-songwriter, musician, and producer
- Dave Malkoff (born 1976), American television journalist
- Mark Malkoff (born 1977), American comedian
- Sol Malkoff (1918–2001), American calligrapher
