= Milt Earnhart =

American politician (1918–2020)

Member of the Arkansas Senate
- In office 1967–1980

Member of the Arkansas House of Representatives
- In office 1959–1966

Personal details
- Born: Gerard Milton Earnhart; April 1, 1918 Pine Lawn, Missouri, U.S.
- Died: June 6, 2020 (aged 102) Fort Smith, Arkansas, U.S.
- Party: Democratic

Military service
- Branch/service: United States Army
- Battles/wars: World War II

Gerard Milton Earnhart (April 1, 1918 – June 6, 2020) was an American politician and former broadcast journalist. He was a Democratic member of the Arkansas House of Representatives from 1959 to 1966 and the Arkansas Senate from 1967 to 1980.

== Career ==
Earnhart served in the United States Army during World War II. Prior to entering politics, Earnhart was a broadcaster and a weatherman for KFSM-TV, a CBS News affiliate in Fort Smith, Arkansas. He worked in his family's vehicle repair business, originally established as Armbruster & Co in 1921.

== Personal life ==
Earnhart was married to Mary Elizabeth Robben and had three children. He turned 100 in April 2018. Earnhart died on June 6, 2020, at the age of 102.
