= Francis Lupo =

U.S. service member killed in WW1

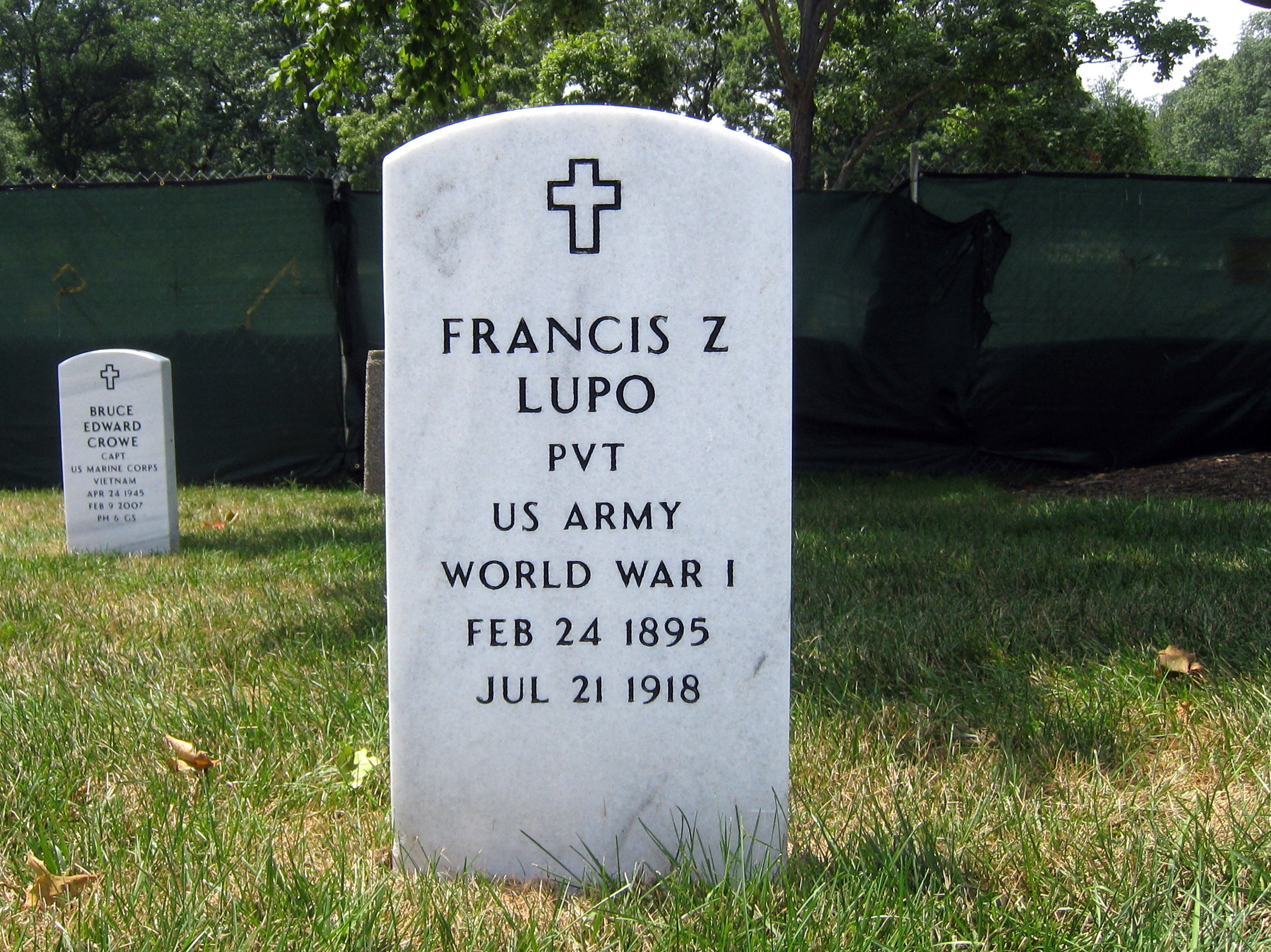
- Lupo's headstone in Arlington National Cemetery
- Born: February 24, 1895
- Died: July 21, 1918 (aged 23); Soissons, France
- Burial place: Arlington National Cemetery
- Military career
- Branch: United States Army
- Rank: Private

Private Francis Lupo, United States Army (February 24, 1895 – July 21, 1918) is the U.S. service member who was, possibly, missing in action for the longest known period, his remains being recovered in 2003 and repatriated. He was killed in action near Soissons, France, during the Army's first large-scale offensive operation of the First World War.

== Background ==
A native of Cincinnati, Ohio, Lupo delivered newspapers before being drafted in October 1917, along with hundreds of thousands of other young American men after Congress declared war on Germany at the behest of President Woodrow Wilson. With only a fifth-grade education, he arrived in France in March 1918, and was assigned to the 18th Infantry Regiment of the U.S. 1st Infantry Division. On July 20, his battalion took part in a French-led attack on a German-held salient near Soissons. Lupo was killed in combat on that same day and was hastily buried on the battlefield, in the same grave with another U.S. soldier.

In 2003, French archaeologists discovered the remains of both men. After the identification of his remains, Lupo's living next-of-kin contacted by the Army was his niece, Rachel Kleisinger. The Remains of Pfc Charles McAllister, recovered with Francis Lupo, were not identified and reburied until August 21, 2024. Lupo was buried with full honors at Arlington National Cemetery in September 2006. The location of the grave is section 66, grave number 7489.

Lupo's name appears on the Tablets of the Missing at the Aisne-Marne American Cemetery in Belleau, France. He was awarded the Purple Heart and the World War I Victory Medal with three Battle Clasps. A rosette is added to his name on the Tablets of the Missing, indicating that his remains were identified and accounted for.

== Advances in forensic technology ==
Modern technology has improved the ability to identify biological samples. Lupo's remains were identified by matching mitochondrial DNA extracted from his bones against the DNA collected from a niece via a saliva swab.
