= Mildred Persinger =

Mildred Tilghman Emory Persinger (April 28, 1918 – November 11, 2018) was an American feminist and international activist for non-governmental organizations (NGO).

Persinger was born in Roanoke, Virginia in April 1918. In the early 1960s Persinger served as a public member on the U.S. Presidential Commission on the Status of Women, and on the Committee Against Discrimination of the American Civil Liberties Union. From 1969 to 1972, Persinger was chairwoman of the Conference of the US Conference of NGOs. Persinger was the United States' World YWCA observer at the United Nations from 1968 to the present.

Persinger chaired the planning and management of the 1975 NGO Forum parallel to the first UN World Women's Conference in Mexico City, the first of the series ending with Beijing 1985. She turned 100 in April 2018 and died later the same year.
