= Paul Stenn =

American football player (1918–2003)

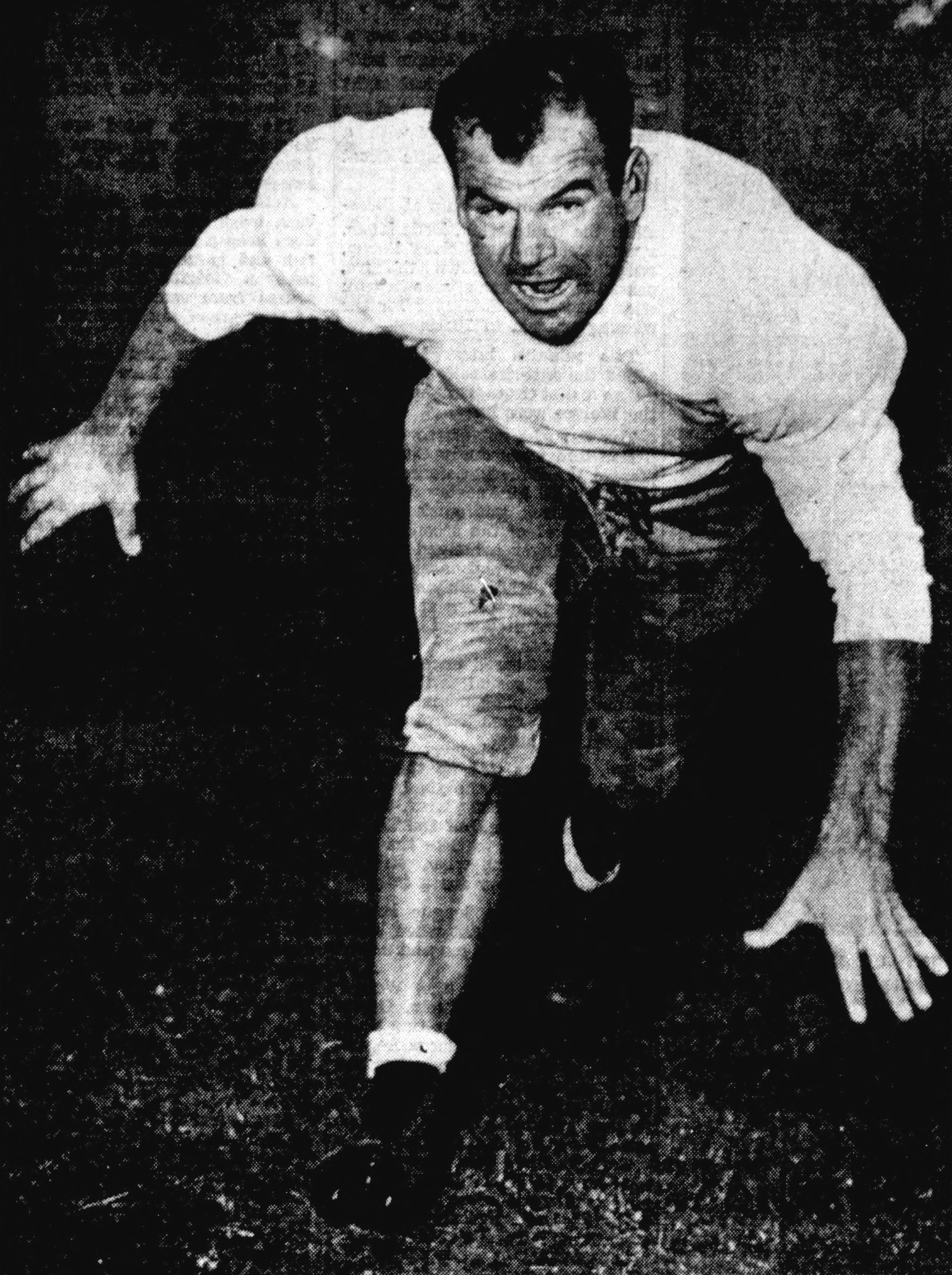
- Stenn, circa 1945

No. 35, 46
- Position: Tackle

Personal information
- Born: July 12, 1918; Berwick, Pennsylvania
- Died: August 2, 2003 (aged 85)

Career information
- College: Villanova

Career history
- 1942: New York Giants
- 1946: Washington Redskins
- 1947: Pittsburgh Steelers
- 1948–1951: Chicago Bears
- Stats at Pro Football Reference

Paul James Stenn Jr. (born Stenko) (July 12, 1918 – August 2, 2003) was an American football offensive tackle in the National Football League for the New York Giants, Washington Redskins, Pittsburgh Steelers, and the Chicago Bears. He attended Villanova University.
