= Josephine Webb =

American electrical engineer (1918–2017)

- Webb in 1968
- Born: Josephine Rohas; June 21, 1918; Niagara Falls, New York, U.S.
- Died: May 4, 2017 (aged 98); Seattle, Washington, U.S.
- Education: Purdue University
- Occupations: Inventor, electrical engineer
- Spouse: Herbert Webb
- Children: Two daughters

Josephine Webb (June 21, 1918 – May 4, 2017) was an American electrical engineer who obtained two patents for oil circuit breaker contact design, known colloquially as "switchgear". She designed an eighteen-inch, full newspaper size fax machine with superior resolution. She co-founded Webb Consulting Company with her husband, also an electrical engineer. She was one of the first female electrical engineers, and considered a pioneer by the Society of Women Engineers. At Purdue University, she was one out of a total of five women engineers.

== Early life ==
Webb was born Josephine Rohas in Niagara Falls, New York on June 21, 1918. She grew up in a one-parent household in Buffalo; her father served in World War I and never returned home. Her brother, Roderick, was two-and-a-half years older. Webb considered him a great influence in her early life, and by causality, her later life. When Roderick became interested in radio, they both became ham radio operators. He helped her get her license. She joined the ham radio club at Kenmore High School. At thirteen years old, Josephine was the youngest YL operator.

As a child, Webb loved aviation and often visited the local airport. She was good at math and joined her high school's science club. She had always been fascinated by technical subjects. She graduated Kenmore High School in 1934. She worked for two years before attending Purdue University.

== Education ==
Webb's brother urged her to apply to an out-of-state scholarship. She majored in electrical engineering and graduated from Purdue University in 1940. She became a Buhl Research Fellow in the Electrical Engineering Department of the Carnegie Institute of Technology for two years. She was a member of Sigma Xi.

== Career ==
In 1942, she joined Westinghouse Electric Corporation as a Design Engineer, where among other duties, she worked on the electrical grids for the Coulee, Hoover, and Boulder Dams. It was during her tenure with the company that she obtained two patents for oil circuit breaker contact design.

In 1946, Webb became Director of Development for the Facsimile Development Laboratory at the Alden Products Company where she designed an eighteen-inch, full newspaper size fax machine with exceptional resolution for that time. Later, Webb co-founded the Webb Consulting Company with her husband, Herbert Webb. They specialized in electrical-electronic measurement instrumentation, communications applications, and photographic test devices. They worked for clients as diverse as Boeing and the U.S. Bureau of Mines.

In addition to the consulting business, Webb also took a position in 1977 with North Idaho College where she began development of a Computer Center and worked on several government grants for enhancing the campus and its educational programs.

Webb held four patents for her innovative work and had been active in many professional organizations including IEEE, NSPE, and SWE where she held Fellows status.

== Personal life and death ==
Webb had two daughters, one was born in 1948 and the other 1952. The family had a laboratory, which was also set up as a measurements laboratory, as an addition to their home.

Webb died in Seattle on May 4, 2017, at the age of 98.

== See also ==
- Society of Women Engineers
- Institute of Electrical and Electronics Engineers
- National Society of Professional Engineers
