= Millie Bailey =

US Army officer and civil servant (1918–2022)

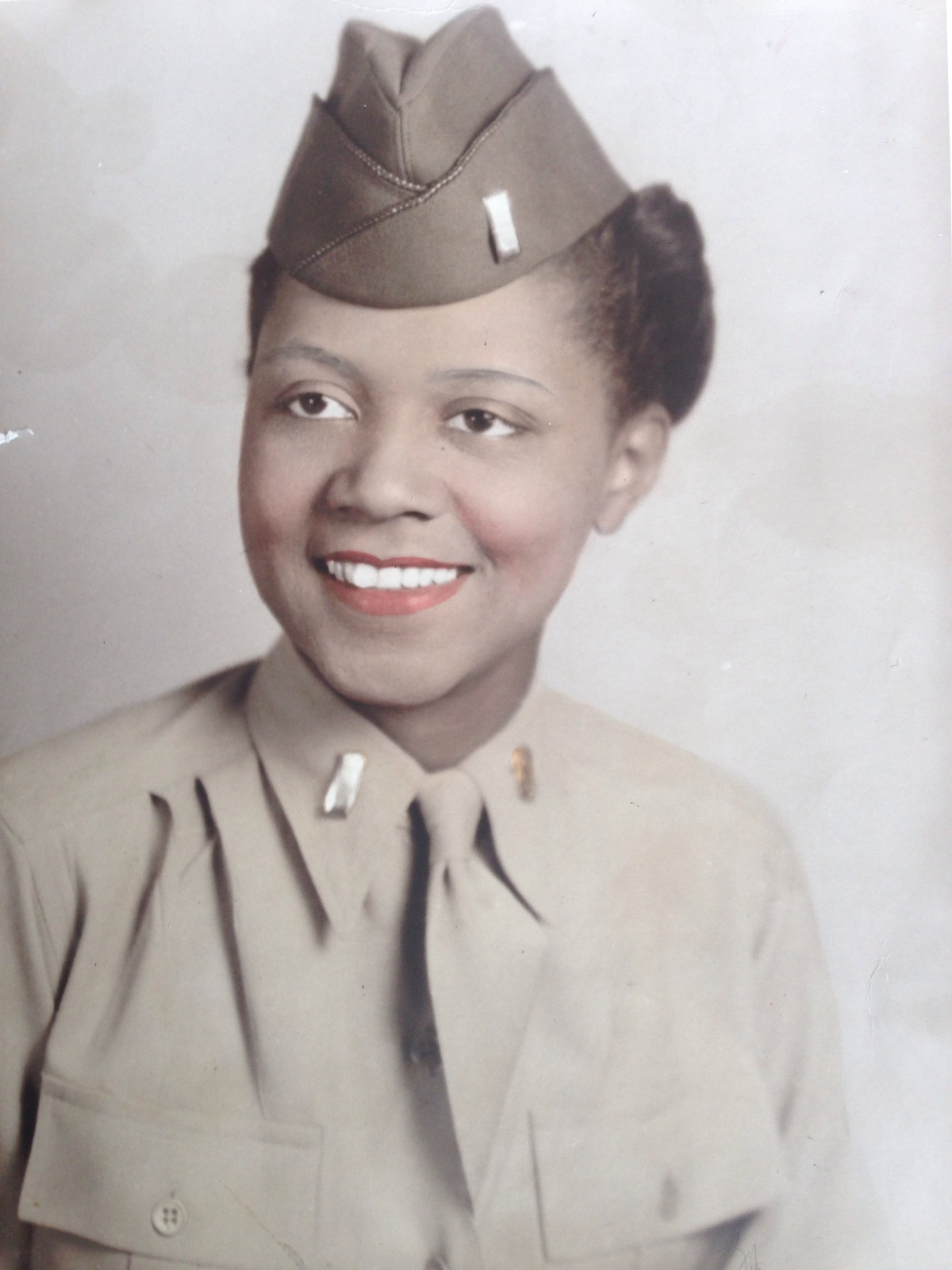
- Bailey in 1945
- Born: Vivian Mildred Corbett; February 3, 1918; Washington, D.C., U.S.
- Died: May 1, 2022 (aged 104); Ellicott City, Maryland, U.S.
- Spouse: William Bailey
- Military career
- Allegiance: United States
- Branch: United States Army
- Service years: 1943–1946
- Rank: First lieutenant
- Unit: Women's Army Corps
- Conflicts: World War II
- Other work: Civil servant, volunteer

Vivian Mildred Bailey (née Corbett; February 3, 1918 – May 1, 2022) was an American World War II veteran, civil servant, and volunteer. She was a fundraiser for education, health, and military service personnel. Bailey was one of the first African American officers in the Women's Army Corps and served as a commander of the Women's Colored Detachment. Bailey was a division director in the Social Security Administration.

== Early life and education ==
Vivian Mildred Corbett was born in Washington, D.C., on February 3, 1918. Her mother moved the children back to her hometown of Tulsa, Oklahoma, after Bailey's father was deployed for World War I. She attended segregated schools. She knew historian John Hope Franklin from her upbringing in Tulsa.

== Career ==
Bailey was one of only two black women to earn superior rank at her officer's course. She received her commission as a first lieutenant in Fort Des Moines Provisional Army Officer Training School and served in the Women's Army Corps from 1943 to 1946. Bailey became second-in-command of the Women's Colored Detachment at Fort McClellan. She later served as a commander of the all-female detachment before being selected to attend the Adjutant General School Officers' Administration Course. As one of only two Black women in the class, she graduated with outstanding marks and went on to serve for the first time with an unsegregated unit.

Speaking of her experiences, Bailey shared she did not experience gender discrimination but that the troops were racially segregated. The first time she went off post alone at Fort McClellan, a white woman spat at her and said, "Look at that black bitch." Bailey pretended to not notice, citing fears of lynching. In contrast, Bailey also shared that her commanding general, a white man, treated her with kindness while she was at a training camp in San Antonio. At Fort Benning, Bailey was a first lieutenant in charge of 144 women.

After leaving the U.S. Army, Bailey moved to Chicago and worked for the United States Department of Veterans Affairs and the Social Security Administration. In 1970, she transferred to the Social Security office in Baltimore as a division director and retired in 1975.

Bailey was an active community volunteer and fundraiser for education, health, and the military. From 1966, Bailey collected, packed, and shipped CARE packages for U.S. Military service members. From 1982 to 1993, Bailey served on the Maryland Health Resources Planning Commission and was involved with the approval of the first magnetic resonance imaging and CT scanners in the state. She left the commission to join the Howard County General Hospital board of trustees where she served for 23 years before stepping down in 2015.

Bailey was a member of the Howard County Police Citizens Advisory Council. From 1999, she advocated and fundraised for Running Brook Elementary School. Bailey often raised over $10,000 annually for the students.

On October 22, 2020, the Vivian C. "Millie" Bailey Neighborhood Square on Lake Kittamaqundi was dedicated in her honor.

== Personal life and death ==
Bailey met her future husband, William Bailey, on April 10, 1943, the same day she was commissioned. They married after leaving the U.S. Army. The couple had no children. In 1970, they moved to Columbia, Maryland, where Bailey resided for the rest of her life. She enjoyed traveling and had been to fifty countries as of 2013. For her 100th birthday wish, Bailey expressed a desire for true equality for future generations. In 2020, she went skydiving at the age of 102. Bailey died in Ellicott City, Maryland, on May 1, 2022, at the age of 104.
