= Robert E. Thacker =

American test pilot (1918–2020)

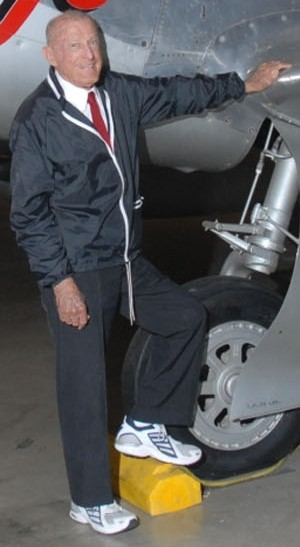
- Col. Robert Thacker in front of the F-82 Twin Mustang in 2017
- Born: Robert Eli Thacker; February 21, 1918; El Centro, California, U.S.
- Died: November 25, 2020 (aged 102); San Clemente, California, U.S.
- Military career
- Allegiance: United States
- Branch: United States Air Force
- Service years: 1939–1970
- Rank: Colonel
- Units: 384th Bombardment Group, 547th Bombardment Squadron
- Known for: Longest nonstop flight by a propeller-driven fighter (5,051 miles flown in a F-82 in February 1947); 80 missions flown in World War 2
- Awards: Silver Star (2); Distinguished Flying Cross (3); Air Medal (10)
- Other work: Test pilot; Aviation industry advisor

Robert E. Thacker (February 21, 1918 – November 25, 2020) was an American test pilot, aeromodeling enthusiast and designer, one of the few pilots in history to do tours of duty in two different theaters of operation (Europe and the Pacific) in World War II and the holder of a number of aviation records.

== Biography ==
Thacker was born in February 1918. His interest in aviation was sparked in 1926 at age eight when a neighbor purchased an operating model aircraft. By 1929, Thacker had completed his first model, that of the Spirit of St. Louis, and went on to earn spending money building balsa gliders. He joined his first aeromodeling club in El Centro, California in 1932. He would also become the Southern California yo-yo champion that year; his prize was $40.00 in the form of $25, $10 and $5 gold coins.

In wartime, Thacker flew two tours of duty in a B-17 in World War II, a single tour in the Korean War with a B-29 Superfortress and classified high-altitude reconnaissance missions during the Vietnam War. His initiation into World War II came when he was one of the pilots of a flight of 12 B-17s bound for the Philippines via Hawaii; they arrived in Hawaii just before 8:00 am on December 7, 1941, in the midst of the surprise Japanese attack on Pearl Harbor.

His wartime service earned him two Silver Stars, three Distinguished Flying Crosses, ten Air Medals and the French Croix de Guerre with Palm.

A graduate of the Air Force Test Pilot Academy at California's Edwards Air Force Base, Thacker was responsible for testing a wide variety of aircraft between 1939 and 1970, including the first accelerated tests of the P-80 combat-ready jet fighter, assisted by then Captain Chuck Yeager.

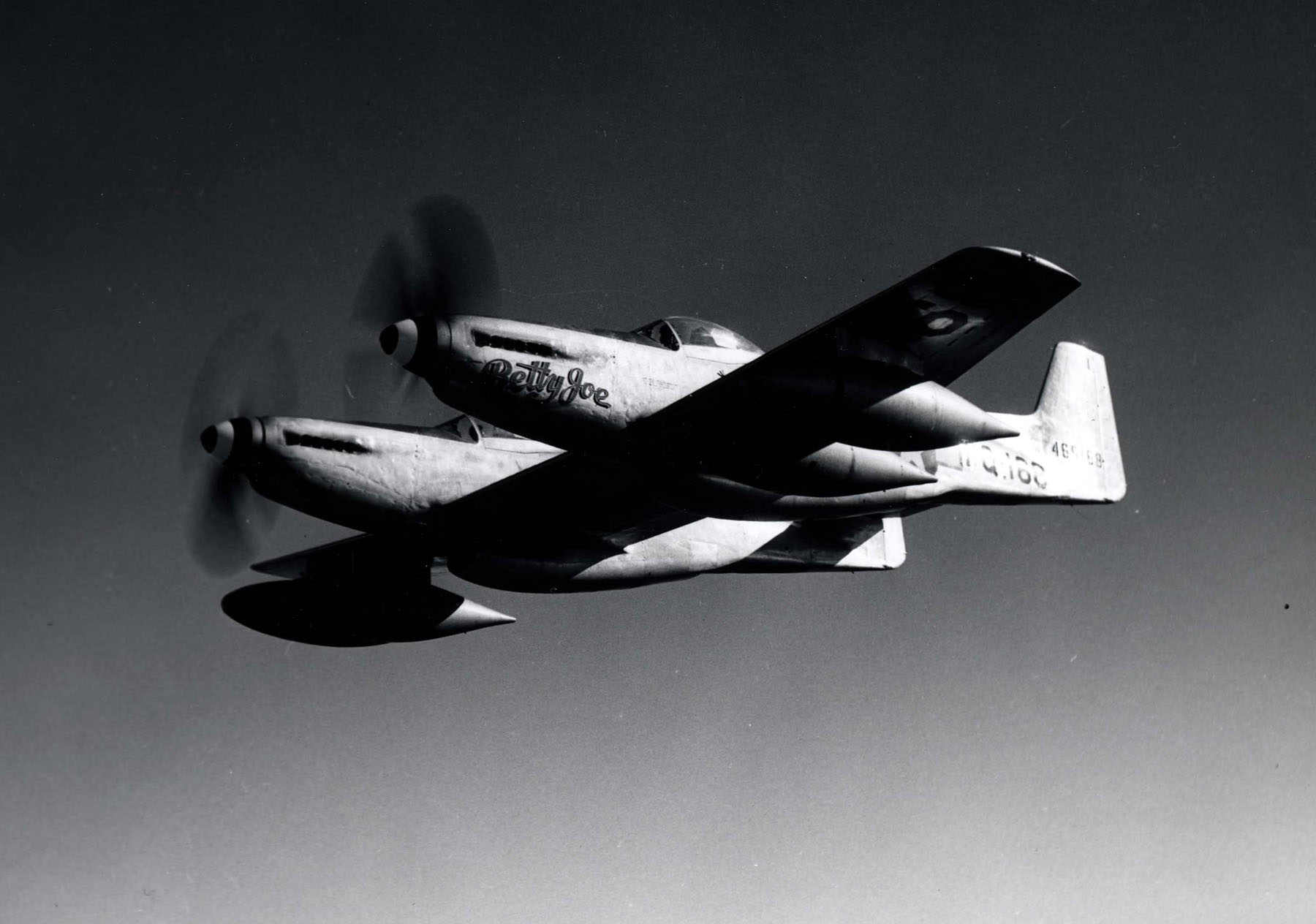
The Betty Jo P-82 in flight

His most notable achievement came in 1947 with his test of Betty Jo, a North American F-82 Twin Mustang named after his wife. This was to be the first nonstop test of a fully laden fighter between Honolulu, Hawaii and New York City, New York. The 14-hour-32-minute test, which started at Hickam Air Force Base on February 27 and which ended at LaGuardia Airport was a success; Thacker even set the speed record at an average of 350 miles per hour (560 km/h). Both the aircraft and the flight jacket Thacker wore are on display at the National Museum of the United States Air Force at Wright-Patterson Air Force Base. His co-pilot on the trip was Lieutenant John Ard. The trip remains the longest and fastest ever by a propeller-driven fighter.

Another notable achievement came in 1972 when Bob served as an advisor on a solar-powered aircraft project designed and built by Astro Flight for Lockheed.

On January 9, 2010, Colonel Thacker was inducted into the Academy of Model Aeronautics Hall of Fame for his work in both model and full-scale aviation during day two of the AMA's annual exposition at the Ontario Convention Center, Ontario, California. Among the dignitaries present were then-AMA president Dave Brown and retired space shuttle commander Robert "Hoot" Gibson, himself a strong supporter of the AMA.

Thacker latterly resided in San Clemente, California, where he remained active in the hobby of radio-controlled model aviation as an active AMA member, and frequently participated in meets in and around Southern California with his giant-scale, turbine-powered F-15 Eagle. He turned 100 in February 2018 and died in November 2020 at the age of 102.
