= Warren Hair =

American basketball player

Personal information
- Born: July 18, 1918 Chicago, Illinois
- Died: December 21, 2006 (aged 88) Houston, Texas

Career information
- High school: St. Anne (St. Anne Township, Illinois)
- College: Gallagher Business School
- Position: Guard

Career history
- 1937–1938: Kankakee Gallagher Trojans

Warren Ray Hair (July 18, 1918 – December 21, 2006) was an American professional basketball player. He played in the National Basketball League for the Kankakee Gallagher Trojans during the 1937–38 season and averaged 4.2 points per game.
