= Stanley Lebergott =

American economist (1918–2009)

- Born: July 22, 1918; Detroit, Michigan, US
- Died: July 24, 2009 (aged 91); Middletown, Connecticut, US
- Education: University of Michigan
- Occupation(s): Government economist, Professor Emeritus
- Employer(s): Bureau of Labor Statistics, Wesleyan University
- Known for: Economic books and historical unemployment statistics

Stanley Lebergott (July 22, 1918 – July 24, 2009) was a prominent American government economist and professor emeritus of economics at Wesleyan University.

== Early life and family ==
Lebergott was born in Detroit, Michigan, on July 22, 1918, and went to the University of Michigan, where he got both a bachelor's degree and a master's degree in economics in the late 1930s. He married Ruth Wellington in 1941, and they had two children (one daughter and one son), Karen and Steven. Steven died in 1995, but Lebergott's wife and daughter Karen outlived him.

== Career ==
Lebergott joined the Bureau of Labor Statistics in 1940. He compiled historical unemployment statistics for the time period between 1890 and the 1950s, and his statistics were widely popular until Christina Romer and others found flaws in them and accordingly modified them. He joined the Wesleyan University faculty in 1962 and stayed there until his retirement in 1995. He also wrote a book called "Manpower in Economic Growth" in 1964, in which he discussed U.S. historical economic growth, poverty, and income inequality. In 1975, he wrote "Wealth and Want", a book about how government policies affect poverty. In 1993, he wrote another book called "Pursuing Happiness: American Consumers in the Twentieth Century".

Lebergott consistently argued about the positive impact of consumerism on the U.S. economy and the standard of living of the American people (including improved health, higher wages, less drug use, better technology, and more privacy) throughout his career. Boston University economics professor Robert Margo wrote that

Lebergott's influence on economic history has been profound. There are few activities that economic historians can engage in of greater consequence than reconstructing the hard numbers. In this line of work Lebergott had few peers. 'Manpower' put the labor force—people—at the center of economic history, not the bloodless 'agents' of economic models but real people.

This statement indicated the importance of Lebergott's work in academic economic discourse. In 1963 he was elected as a Fellow of the American Statistical Association.

== Death ==
Lebergott died on July 24, 2009, in his home in Middletown, Connecticut. His death was due to cardiac arrest and occurred just two days after he celebrated his 91st birthday.
