= Sol Malkoff =

American calligrapher

Sol Malkoff (1918 – January 17, 2001) was a calligrapher and designer known for his work with Rand McNally, Gould Typographers, and Typography Shop. He influenced the development of modern calligraphy through his teaching and writing on the subject.

== Biography ==
Malkoff was born in 1918 in Chicago, where he trained at the School of the Art Institute of Chicago and the Newberry Library Calligraphy Study Group. Afterwards he worked with the Rand McNally & Co. He left Chicago in 1947 for the roles of principal Typography Shop in Atlanta and at Gould Typographers in New York.

During the latter part of his career, he published articles and manuals on calligraphy, handwriting, and typography.

He moved to Florida in 1979, where he continued to work in typography and taught.

Malkoff died in 2001.
