= 1917 in the United States =

- Decades: 1890s; 1900s; 1910s; 1920s; 1930s
- See also: History of the United States (1865–1918); Timeline of United States history (1900–1929); List of years in the United States

Events from the year 1917 in the United States

== Incumbents ==
=== Federal government ===
- President: Woodrow Wilson (D-New Jersey)
- Vice President: Thomas R. Marshall (D-Indiana)
- Chief Justice: Edward Douglass White (Louisiana)
- Speaker of the House of Representatives: Champ Clark (D-Missouri)
- Congress: 64th (until March 4), 65th (starting March 4)

==== State governments ====
Governors and lieutenant governors

=== Governors ===
- Governor of Alabama: Charles Henderson (Democratic)
- Governor of Arizona:
  - until January 1: George W. P. Hunt (Democratic)
  - January 1-December 25: Thomas Edward Campbell (Republican)
  - starting December 25: George W. P. Hunt (Democratic)
- Governor of Arkansas: George Washington Hays (Democratic) (until January 10), Charles Hillman Brough (Democratic) (starting January 10)
- Governor of California: Hiram Johnson (Republican) (until March 15), William Stephens (Republican) (starting March 15)
- Governor of Colorado: George Alfred Carlson (Republican) (until January 9), Julius Caldeen Gunter (Democratic) (starting January 9)
- Governor of Connecticut: Marcus H. Holcomb (Republican)
- Governor of Delaware: Charles R. Miller (Republican) (until January 16), John G. Townsend, Jr. (Republican) (starting January 16)
- Governor of Florida: Park Trammell (Democratic) (until January 2), Sidney Johnston Catts (Prohibition) (starting January 2)
- Governor of Georgia: Nathaniel E. Harris (Democratic) (until June 30), Hugh M. Dorsey (Democratic) (starting June 30)
- Governor of Idaho: Moses Alexander (Democratic)
- Governor of Illinois: Edward F. Dunne (Democratic) (until January 8), Frank O. Lowden (Republican) (starting January 8)
- Governor of Indiana: Samuel M. Ralston (Democratic) (until January 8), James P. Goodrich (Republican) (starting January 8)
- Governor of Iowa: George W. Clarke (Republican) (until January 11), William L. Harding (Republican) (starting January 11)
- Governor of Kansas: Arthur Capper (Republican)
- Governor of Kentucky: Augustus O. Stanley (Democratic)
- Governor of Louisiana: Ruffin G. Pleasant (Democratic)
- Governor of Maine: Oakley C. Curtis (Democratic) (until January 3), Carl E. Milliken (Republican) (starting January 3)
- Governor of Maryland: Emerson C. Harrington (Democratic)
- Governor of Massachusetts: Samuel W. McCall (Republican)
- Governor of Michigan: Woodbridge N. Ferris (Democratic) (until January 1), Albert Sleeper (Republican) (starting January 1)
- Governor of Minnesota: J. A. A. Burnquist (Republican)
- Governor of Mississippi: Theodore G. Bilbo (Democratic)
- Governor of Missouri: Elliot Woolfolk Major (Democratic) (until January 8), Frederick D. Gardner (Democratic) (starting January 8)
- Governor of Montana: Sam V. Stewart (Democratic)
- Governor of Nebraska: John H. Morehead (Democratic) (until January 4), Keith Neville (Democratic) (starting January 4)
- Governor of Nevada: Emmet D. Boyle (Democratic)
- Governor of New Hampshire: Rolland H. Spaulding (Republican) (until January 2), Henry W. Keyes (Republican) (starting January 2)
- Governor of New Jersey: James Fairman Fielder (Democratic) (until January 16), Walter Evans Edge (Republican) (starting January 16)
- Governor of New Mexico:
  - until January 1: William C. McDonald (Democratic)
  - January 1-February 18: Ezequiel C. de Baca (Democratic)
  - starting February 18: Washington Ellsworth Lindsey (Republican)
- Governor of New York: Charles S. Whitman (Republican)
- Governor of North Carolina: Locke Craig (Democratic) (until January 11), Thomas Walter Bickett (Democratic) (starting January 11)
- Governor of North Dakota: L. B. Hanna (Republican) (until January 3), Lynn Frazier (Republican) (starting January 3)
- Governor of Ohio: Frank B. Willis (Democratic) (until January 8), James M. Cox (Democratic) (starting January 8)
- Governor of Oklahoma: Robert L. Williams (Democratic)
- Governor of Oregon: James Withycombe (Republican)
- Governor of Pennsylvania: Martin Grove Brumbaugh (Republican)
- Governor of Rhode Island: R. Livingston Beeckman (Republican)
- Governor of South Carolina: Richard Irvine Manning III (Democratic)
- Governor of South Dakota: Frank M. Byrne (Republican) (until January 2), Peter Norbeck (Republican) (starting January 2)
- Governor of Tennessee: Tom C. Rye (Democratic)
- Governor of Texas: James E. Ferguson (Democratic) (until August 25), William P. Hobby (Democratic) (starting August 25)
- Governor of Utah: William Spry (Republican) (until January 1), Simon Bamberger (Democratic) (starting January 1)
- Governor of Vermont: Charles W. Gates (Republican) (until January 4), Horace F. Graham (Republican) (starting January 4)
- Governor of Virginia: Henry Carter Stuart (Democratic)
- Governor of Washington: Ernest Lister (Democratic)
- Governor of West Virginia: Henry D. Hatfield (Republican) (until March 5), John J. Cornwell (Democratic) (starting March 5)
- Governor of Wisconsin: Emanuel L. Philipp (Republican)
- Governor of Wyoming: John B. Kendrick (Democratic) (until February 26), Frank L. Houx (Democratic) (starting February 26)

=== Lieutenant governors ===
- Lieutenant Governor of Alabama: Thomas E. Kilby (Democratic)
- Lieutenant Governor of California: William Stephens (Republican) (until March 16), vacant (starting March 16)
- Lieutenant Governor of Colorado: Moses E. Lewis (Republican) (until January 12), James A. Pulliam (Democratic) (starting January 12)
- Lieutenant Governor of Connecticut: Clifford B. Wilson (Republican)
- Lieutenant Governor of Delaware: Colen Ferguson (Democratic) (until January 16), Lewis E. Eliason (Democratic) (starting January 16)
- Lieutenant Governor of Idaho: Herman H. Taylor (Republican) (until January 1), Ernest L. Parker (Democratic) (starting January 1)
- Lieutenant Governor of Illinois: Barratt O'Hara (Democratic) (until January 8), John G. Oglesby (Republican) (starting January 8)
- Lieutenant Governor of Indiana: William P. O'Neill (Democratic) (until January 8), Edgar D. Bush (Republican) (starting January 8)
- Lieutenant Governor of Iowa: William L. Harding (Republican) (until January 11), Ernest Robert Moore (Republican) (starting January 11)
- Lieutenant Governor of Kansas: William Yoast Morgan (Republican)
- Lieutenant Governor of Kentucky: James D. Black (Democratic)
- Lieutenant Governor of Louisiana: Fernand Mouton (Democratic)
- Lieutenant Governor of Massachusetts: Calvin Coolidge (Republican)
- Lieutenant Governor of Michigan: Luren D. Dickinson (Republican)
- Lieutenant Governor of Minnesota: George H. Sullivan (Republican) (until January 2), Thomas Frankson (Republican) (starting January 2)
- Lieutenant Governor of Mississippi: Lee Maurice Russell (Democratic)
- Lieutenant Governor of Missouri: William Rock Painter (Democratic) (until January 8), Wallace Crossley (Democratic) (starting January 8)
- Lieutenant Governor of Montana: W. W. McDowell (Democratic)
- Lieutenant Governor of Nebraska: James Pearson (Democratic) (until January 4), Edgar Howard (Democratic) (starting January 4)
- Lieutenant Governor of Nevada: Maurice J. Sullivan (Democratic)
- Lieutenant Governor of New Mexico:
  - until January 1: Ezequiel Cabeza De Baca (Democratic)
  - January 1-February 18: Washington Ellsworth Lindsey (Republican)
  - starting February 18: vacant
- Lieutenant Governor of New York: Edward Schoeneck (Republican)
- Lieutenant Governor of North Carolina: Elijah L. Daughtridge (Democratic) (until January 11), Oliver Max Gardner (Democratic) (starting January 11)
- Lieutenant Governor of North Dakota: John H. Fraine (Republican) (until January 3), Anton T. Kraabel (Republican) (starting January 3)
- Lieutenant Governor of Ohio: John H. Arnold (Republican) (until January 8), Earl D. Bloom (Democratic) (starting January 8)
- Lieutenant Governor of Oklahoma: Martin E. Trapp (Democratic)
- Lieutenant Governor of Pennsylvania: Frank B. McClain (Republican)
- Lieutenant Governor of Rhode Island: Emery J. San Souci (Republican)
- Lieutenant Governor of South Carolina: Andrew Bethea (Democratic)
- Lieutenant Governor of South Dakota: Peter Norbeck (Republican) (until January 2), William H. McMaster (Republican) (starting January 2)
- Lieutenant Governor of Tennessee: Albert E. Hill (Democratic) (until month and day unknown), W. R. Crabtree (Democratic) (starting month and day unknown)
- Lieutenant Governor of Texas: William P. Hobby (Democratic) (until August 25), vacant (starting August 25)
- Lieutenant Governor of Vermont: Hale K. Darling (Republican) (until January 4), Roger W. Hulburd (Republican) (starting January 4)
- Lieutenant Governor of Virginia: James Taylor Ellyson (Democratic)
- Lieutenant Governor of Washington: Louis Folwell Hart (Republican)
- Lieutenant Governor of Wisconsin: Edward F. Dithmar (Republican)

== Events ==
=== January–March ===
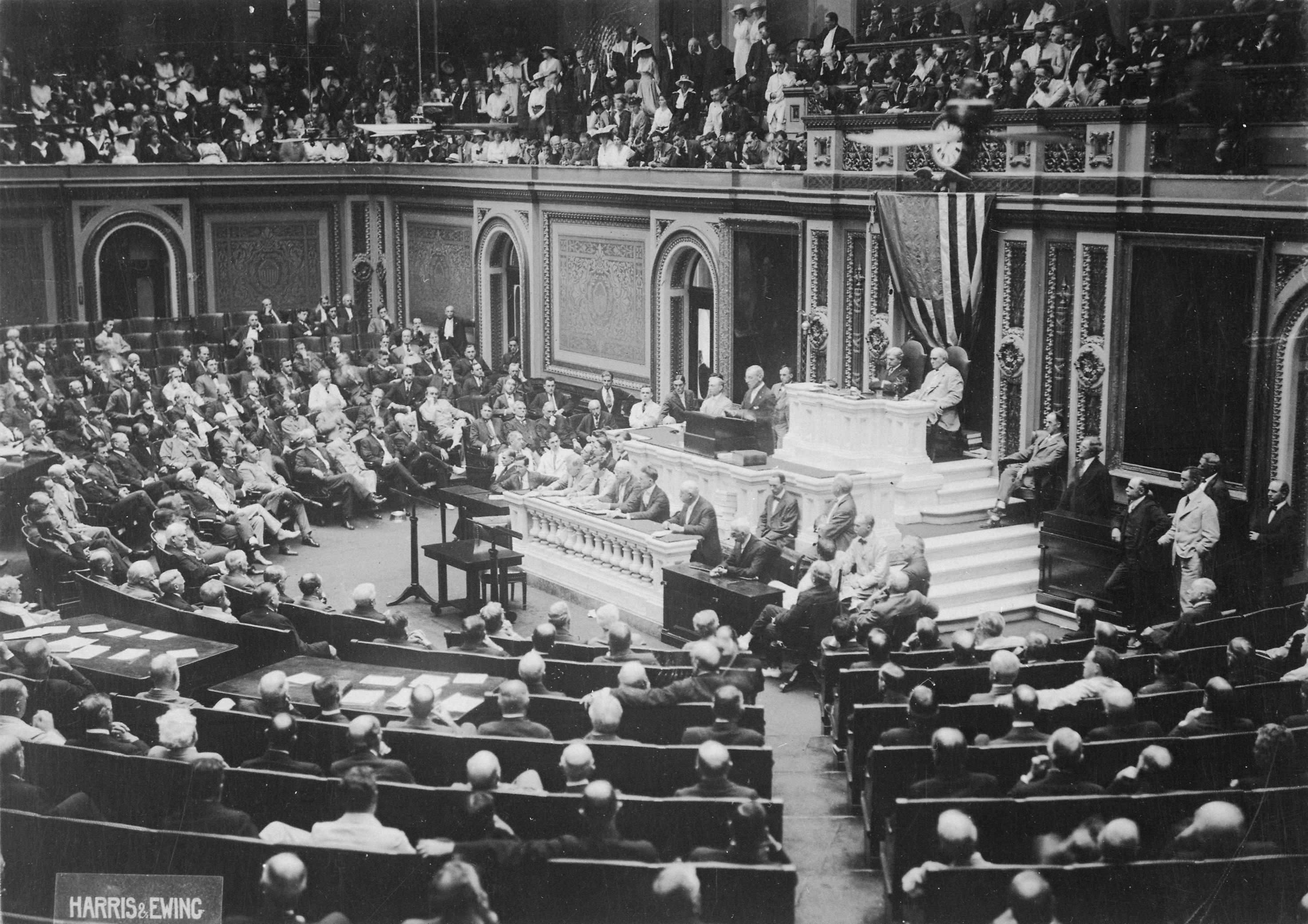
President Wilson before Congress, announcing the break in the official relations with Germany

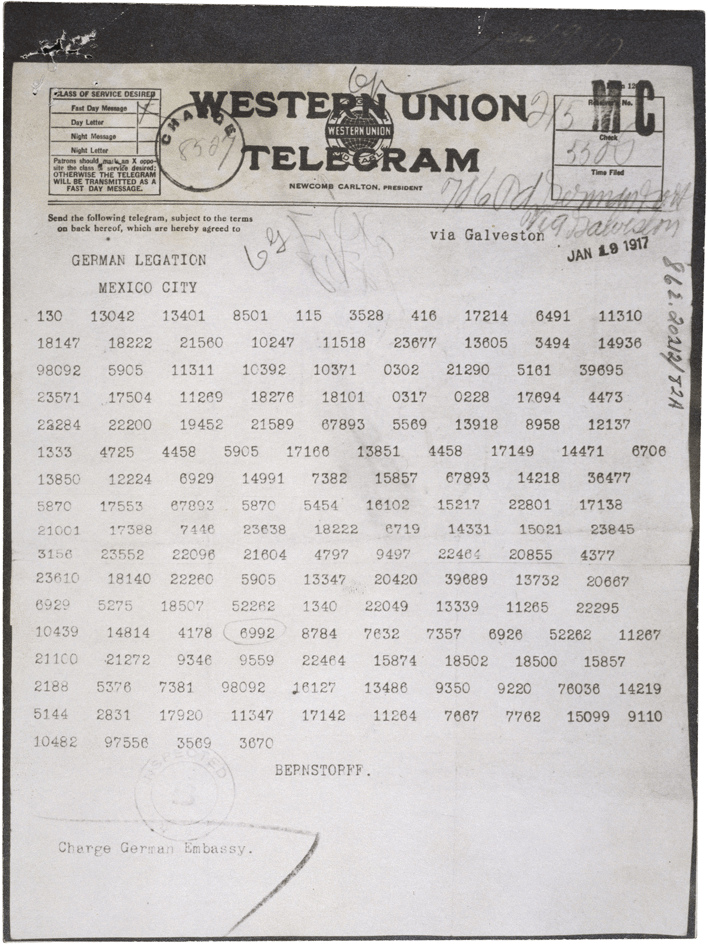
February 24: The Zimmermann Telegram is shown to the U.S. government.

- January 1 – The University of Oregon defeats the University of Pennsylvania 14–0 in college football's 3rd Annual Rose Bowl.
- January 10 – The Silent Sentinels begin their protest in favor of women's suffrage in front of the White House.
- January 11 – German saboteurs set off the Kingsland explosion at Kingsland, New Jersey (modern-day Lyndhurst), one of the events leading to U.S. involvement in World War I.
- January 22 – World War I: President Woodrow Wilson calls for "peace without victory" in Europe.
- January 25
  - The Danish West Indies is sold to the United States for $25 million and become the United States Virgin Islands.
  - An anti-prostitution drive in San Francisco attracts huge crowds to public meetings. At one meeting attended by 7,000 people, 20,000 are kept out for lack of room. In a conference with Rev. Paul Smith, an outspoken foe of prostitution, 300 prostitutes make a plea for toleration, explaining they had been forced into the practice by poverty. When Smith asks if they will take other work at $8 to $10 a week, the ladies laugh derisively, which loses them public sympathy. The police close about 200 houses of prostitution shortly thereafter.
- January 28 – The United States ends its search for Pancho Villa.
- January 30 – Pershing's troops in Mexico begin withdrawing back to the United States. They reach Columbus, New Mexico February 5.
- February 3 – World War I: The United States breaks off diplomatic relations with Germany.
- February 5
  - Congress and Senate override a veto by President Woodrow Wilson to reinstate the Immigration Act of 1917, which allows more restrictions on immigration to the U.S., including the wholesale ban of people from much of Asia.
  - The U.S. Army force under command of John J. Pershing reached Columbus, New Mexico, ending the Pancho Villa Expedition.
- February 17 – New York City Food Riot of 1917
- February 24 – World War I: United States ambassador to the United Kingdom, Walter H. Page, is shown the intercepted Zimmermann Telegram, in which Germany offers to give Texas, Arizona, and New Mexico back to Mexico if Mexico declares war on the United States.
- March 1 – The U.S. government releases the plaintext of the Zimmermann Telegram to the public.
- March 2 – The enactment of the Jones Act grants Puerto Ricans United States citizenship.
- March 4
  - President Woodrow Wilson and Vice President Thomas R. Marshall begin their second terms.
  - Jeannette Rankin of Montana becomes the first woman member of the United States House of Representatives.
- March 7 – "Livery Stable Blues", recorded with "Dixie Jazz Band One Step" on February 26 by the Original Dixieland Jazz Band, becomes the first jazz recording commercially released. On August 17 the band records "Tiger Rag".
- March 8 – The United States Senate adopts the cloture rule in order to limit filibusters.
- March 26 – The Seattle Metropolitans become the first team based in the United States to win the Stanley Cup.
- March 31 – The United States takes possession of the Danish West Indies, which become the US Virgin Islands, after paying $25 million to Denmark.

=== April–June ===
- April 2 – World War I: President Woodrow Wilson asks the U.S. Congress for a declaration of war on Germany.
- April 6 – World War I: Congress passes a resolution declaring war on Germany that is signed into law by President Woodrow Wilson that day.
- April 10 – Eddystone explosion: an explosion at an ammunition plant near Chester, Pennsylvania, kills 139, mostly female workers.
- April 27 – Hastings mine explosion: an explosion in a coal mine in Colorado kills 121.
- May 18 – World War I: The Selective Service Act passes the U.S. Congress, giving the president the power of conscription.
- April 19 – World War I: Army transport SS Mongolia (1903) fires the U.S.'s first shots in anger in the war when her gun crew drives off a German U-boat in the English Channel.
- May 21 – The Great Atlanta fire of 1917 destroys over 300 acres (73 blocks).
- May 26 – A tornado strikes Mattoon, Illinois, causing devastation and killing 101 people.
- June 4 – The very first Pulitzer Prizes are awarded: Laura E. Richards, Maud Howe Elliott, and Florence Hall receive the first Pulitzer for a biography (for Julia Ward Howe). Jean Jules Jusserand receives the first Pulitzer for history for his work With Americans of Past and Present Days. Herbert Bayard Swope receives the first Pulitzer for journalism for his work for the New York World.
- June 5 – World War I: Conscription in the United States begins.
- June 8 – Speculator Mine disaster: a fire at the Granite Mountain and Speculator ore mine outside Butte, Montana kills 168 workers.
- June 13 – Phillips Petroleum Company incorporated in Oklahoma.
- June 15 – The U.S. enacts the Espionage Act, effectively suppressing dissent about U.S. entry in World War I.

=== July–September ===
- July 1–3 – East St. Louis massacre: A labor dispute ignites a race riot in East St. Louis, Illinois, which leaves 250 dead.
- July 12 – The Phelps Dodge Corporation deports over 1,000 suspected IWW members from Bisbee, Arizona.
- July 28 – The Silent Parade is organized by the NAACP in New York to protest the East St. Louis massacre of early July, as well as lynchings in Texas and Tennessee.
- August
  - The Green Corn Rebellion, an uprising by several hundred farmers against the World War I draft, takes place in central Oklahoma.
  - The Messenger, a political and literary magazine by and for African-Americans, begins publication in New York City.
- August 3 – The New York Guard is founded.
- August 23 – Following the detention of an African American soldier, 150 soldiers of the 24th Infantry Regiment march on Houston in what would be called the Houston Riot; four soldiers and 15 civilians die and, following courts-martial, 19 soldiers are hanged.

=== October–December ===
- October 12 – The first regiment is stationed at the newly commissioned Naval Operating Base in Norfolk, VA.
- October 19 – Dallas Love Field opens as an airfield in Texas.
- November 7 – Women's suffrage in the United States: Women win the right to vote in New York State.
- November 14 – Night of Terror: The superintendent of the Occoquan Workhouse in Virginia orders the guards to brutalize the suffragist inmates.
- November 17 – Action of 17 November 1917: United States Navy destroyers USS Fanning and USS Nicholson capture Imperial German Navy U-boat SM U-58 off the south-west coast of Ireland, the first combat action in which U.S. ships take a submarine (which is then scuttled).
- November 24 – In Milwaukee, Wisconsin, 9 members of the Milwaukee Police Department are killed by a bomb, the most fatal single event in U.S. police history until the September 11, 2001 attacks.
- December 1–31 – A severe cold wave in Interior Alaska produces the coldest recorded mean monthly temperatures in the United States. Fort Yukon averages −48.3 °F or −44.6 °C and Eagle −46 °F or −43.3 °C.
- December 6 – U.S. Navy destroyer USS Jacob Jones is torpedoed and sunk in the Atlantic Ocean south west of the British Isles by German submarine U-53, killing 66 crew in the first significant American naval loss of the war, the first ever U.S. destroyer loss to an enemy.
- December 7 – World War I: The United States declares war on Austria-Hungary.
- December 20 – Shepherdsville train wreck kills 49 and injuries 52 people. It becomes the deadliest train wreck in Kentucky history.
- December 25 – Why Marry?, the first dramatic play to win a Pulitzer Prize, opens at the Astor Theatre in New York City.
- December 26 – United States president Woodrow Wilson uses the Federal Possession and Control Act to place most U.S. railroads under the United States Railroad Administration, with the aim of transporting troops and materials for the war effort more efficiently.

=== Undated ===
- George Drumm writes the concert march "Hail, America" in New York City.
- The calendar year is the coolest averaged over the contiguous United States in mean temperature (average of 50.06 °F or 10.03 °C against a long-term average of 51.86 °F or 11.03 °C) and minimum temperature (37.62 °F or 3.12 °C against a long-term average of 39.84 °F or 4.36 °C). it is also the second-driest with a coast-to-coast average precipitation of 25.35 inches or 643.9 millimetres against a long-term mean of 29.57 inches or 751.1 millimetres.

=== Ongoing ===
- Progressive Era (1890s–1920s)
- Lochner era (c. 1897–c. 1937)
- U.S. occupation of Haiti (1915–34)
- U.S. occupation of the Dominican Republic (1916-1924)
- Pancho Villa Expedition (1916–17)
- World War I, U.S. involvement (1917–18)
- First Red Scare (1917–20)

== Births ==
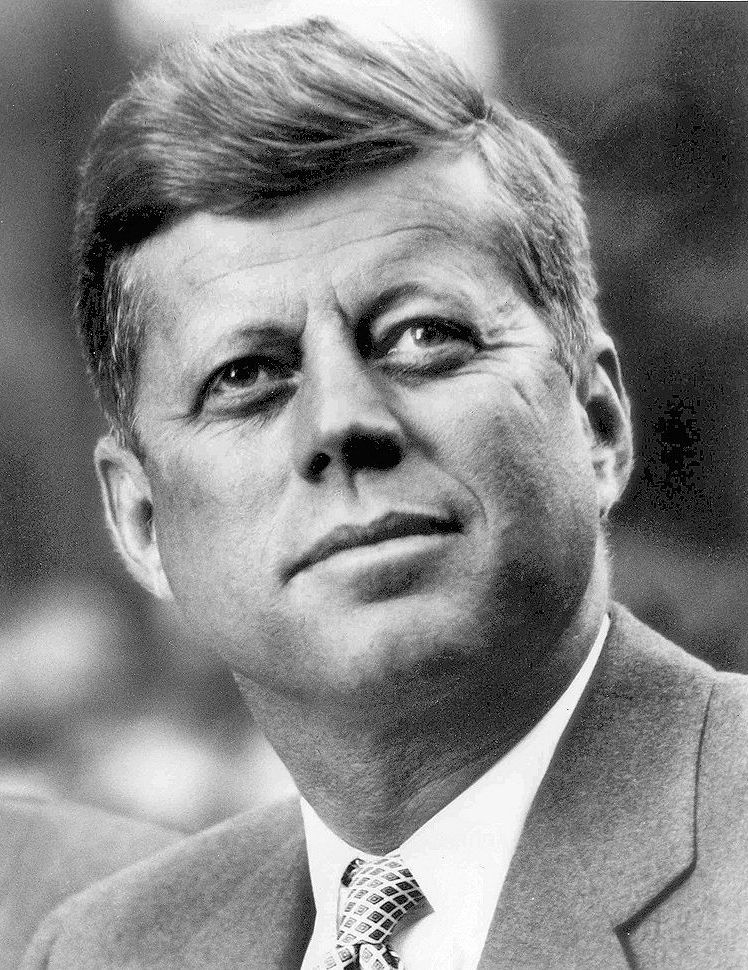
John F. Kennedy

=== January–February ===
- January 1
  - Shannon Bolin, actress and singer (died 2016)
  - Albin F. Irzyk, Brigadier General (died 2018)
- January 3
  - Roger W. Straus, Jr., publisher (died 2004)
  - Jesse White, actor (died 1997)
- January 5
  - Francis L. Kellogg, diplomat and socialite (died 2006)
  - Jane Wyman, film actress and philanthropist (died 2007)
- January 10 – Jerry Wexler, record producer (died 2008)
- January 11 – Henry Morgenthau III, author and television producer (died 2018)
- January 12 – Jimmy Skinner, ice hockey coach (Detroit Red Wings) (died 2007)
- January 16 – Carl Karcher, businessman, founder of the Carl's Jr. hamburger chain (died 2008)
- January 22 – Michael Elkins, broadcaster and journalist (died 2001)
- January 24 – Ernest Borgnine, film actor (died 2012)
- January 26
  - William Verity Jr., politician (died 2007)
  - Louis Zamperini, American prisoner of war (World War II), Olympic distance athlete (1936), and Christian evangelist (died 2014)
- January 29
  - John Raitt, actor and singer (died 2005)
  - David Rubitsky, U.S. Army sergeant (died 2013)
- February 6 – Arnold Spielberg, electrical engineer and father of Steven Spielberg (died 2020)
- February 11 – Sidney Sheldon, author and television writer (died 2007)
- February 12 – Dom DiMaggio, baseball player (died 2009)
- February 14 – Herbert A. Hauptman, mathematician, recipient of the Nobel Prize in Chemistry in 1985 (died 2011)
- February 15 – Meg Wyllie, actress (died 2002)
- February 19 – Carson McCullers, author (died 1967)
- February 20
  - Manny Farber, painter and film critic (died 2008)
  - Wilma Vinsant, flight nurse who served during WWII (died 1945)
- February 21 – Lucille Bremer, actress and dancer (died 1996)
- February 22 – Reed Crandall, illustrator (died 1982)
- February 25 – Brenda Joyce, film actress (died 2009)
- February 26 – Robert Taft Jr., American politician (died 1993)
- February 27 – John Connally, Governor of Texas from 1963 to 1969 (died 1993)
- February 28 – Bentley Kassal, attorney (died 2019)

=== March–April ===
- March 1 – Robert Lowell, poet (died 1997)
- March 4 – Clyde McCullough, baseball catcher (died 1982)
- March 8 – George H. Gay Jr., United States Navy officer (died 1994)
- March 10 – Edith Iglauer, writer (died 2019)
- March 11 – James Megellas, United States Army officer (died 2020)
- March 12 – Milton Resnick, painter (died 2004)
- March 19 – Peggy Ahern, actress (died 2012)
- March 21 – Anton Coppola, orchestra conductor and composer (died 2020)
- March 22 – Virginia Grey, actress (died 2004)
- March 23 – Kenneth Tobey, actor (died 2002)
- March 26 – Rufus Thomas, African American R&B singer (died 2001)
- March 27 – Cyrus Vance, U.S. Secretary of State from 1977 to 1980 (died 2002)
- March 29 – Man o' War, racehorse (died 1947)
- April 1
  - Sheldon Mayer, author and illustrator (died 1991)
  - Leon Janney, actor (died 1980)
- April 2 – Dabbs Greer, actor (died 2007)
- April 5 – Robert Bloch, author (died 1994)
- April 7 – R. G. Armstrong, Western film character actor (died 2012)
- April 8 – John Whitney, animator, composer, and pioneer in computer animation (died 1995)
- April 9 – Brad Dexter, actor (died 2002)
- April 10 – Robert B. Woodward, organic chemist, recipient of the Nobel Prize in Chemistry in 1965 (died 1979)
- April 11 – Morton Sobell, spy (died 2018)
- April 12
  - Helen Forrest, big band singer (died 1999)
  - Hound Dog Taylor, guitarist and singer (died 1975)
- April 13
  - Robert O. Anderson, businessman, founder of Atlantic Richfield Oil Co. (died 2007)
  - Bill Clements, Governor of Texas from 1979 to 1983 and 1987 to 1991 (died 2011)
- April 14 – Marvin Miller, baseball executive (died 2012)
- April 15 – Curtis Blake, businessman and philanthropist (died 2019)
- April 22 – Ambrose Schindler, American football player, actor (died 2018)
- April 23 – Dorian Leigh, model (died 2008)
- April 25 – Ella Fitzgerald, African American jazz singer (died 1996)
- April 26 – Virgil Trucks, baseball player (died 2013)
- April 28 – Robert Cornthwaite, character actor (died 2006)
- April 29
  - Celeste Holm, actress (died 2012)
  - Morton Tubor, film and sound editor (died 2019)
- April 30 – Bea Wain, big band singer (died 2017)

=== May ===
- May 1 – John Beradino, baseball player and television actor (died 1996)
- May 8
  - John Anderson, Jr., politician (died 2014)
  - Kenneth N. Taylor, translator of The Living Bible (died 2005)
- May 14
  - Lou Harrison, composer (died 2003)
  - Norman Luboff, choral director (died 1987)
- May 15 – Eleanor Maccoby, psychologist (died 2018)
- May 22 – Sid Melton, actor (died 2011)
- May 25 – Theodore Hesburgh, priest and educator (died 2015)
- May 26 – Ralph Weymouth, Vice admiral and anti-nuclear activist (died 2020)
- May 28
  - Papa John Creach, African American fiddler (died 1994)
  - Marshall Reed, actor (died 1980)
- May 29
  - Fred Ascani, U.S. Air Force test pilot (died 2010)
  - John F. Kennedy, 35th president of the United States from 1961 to 1963 (died 1963)

=== June ===
- June 1 – William S. Knowles, chemist, recipient of the Nobel Prize in Chemistry in 2001 (died 2012)
- June 2 – Max Showalter (Casey Adams), actor (died 2000)
- June 3 – Leo Gorcey, actor (died 1969)
- June 4
  - Robert Merrill, operatic baritone (died 2004)
  - Howard Metzenbaum, U.S. Senator from Ohio (died 2008)
- June 6 – Kirk Kerkorian, businessman (died 2015)
- June 7
  - Gwendolyn Brooks, African American poet (died 2000)
  - Dean Martin, actor and singer (died 1995)
- June 8 – George D. Wallace, actor (died 2005)
- June 10
  - DeWitt Hale, politician (died 2018)
  - Al Schwimmer, Israeli businessman, founder of Israel Aerospace Industries (died 2011 in Israel)
- June 11 – Joseph B. Wirthlin, businessman and religious leader (died 2008)
- June 15
  - John Fenn, analytical chemist, recipient of the Nobel Prize in Chemistry in 2002 (died 2010)
  - Lash LaRue, Western film actor (died 1996)
- June 16
  - Katharine Graham, publisher (died 2001)
  - Irving Penn, photographer (died 2009)
- June 17 – Ben Bubar, presidential candidate (died 1995)
- June 18 – Ross Elliott, character actor (died 1999)
- June 19
  - Robert Baker Aitken, Zen Buddhist teacher (died 2010)
  - Robert Karnes, television actor (died 1979)
  - Dave Lambert, jazz vocalist (died 1966)
- June 24 – Lucy Jarvis, television producer (died 2020)
- June 28 – A. E. Hotchner, writer (died 2020)
- June 30
  - Susan Hayward, film actress (died 1975)
  - Lena Horne, African American singer and actress (died 2010)
  - Willa Kim, costume designer (died 2016)

=== July ===
- July 3
  - Donald Wills Douglas Jr., industrialist and Olympic sportsman (died 2004)
  - Albert N. Whiting, academic and administrator (died 2020)
- July 5 – Kathleen Gemberling Adkison, abstract painter (died 2010)
- July 7 – Larry O'Brien, politician and basketball commissioner (died 1990)
- July 9 – Frank Wayne, television game show producer (died 1988)
- July 10
  - Don Herbert, television personality (Mr. Wizard) (died 2007)
  - Dayton S. Mak, diplomat (died 2018)
- July 12 – Andrew Wyeth, painter (died 2009)
- July 15 – Joan Roberts, actress (died 2012)
- July 16
  - Alex Urban, American football player (died 2007)
  - William Woodson, voice actor (died 2017)
- July 17
  - Gus Arriola, comic strip cartoonist and animator (died 2008)
  - Lou Boudreau, baseball player and manager (died 2001)
  - Phyllis Diller, comedian (died 2012)
  - Red Sovine, country and folk singer-songwriter (died 1980)
- July 19 – William Scranton, politician (died 2013)
- July 21 – Sidney Leviss, politician and judge (died 2007)
- July 22 – Larry Hooper, singer and musician (died 1983)
- July 24 – Clarence F. Stephens, mathematician and educator (died 2018)
- July 26 – Lorna Gray, actress (died 2017)

=== August–September ===
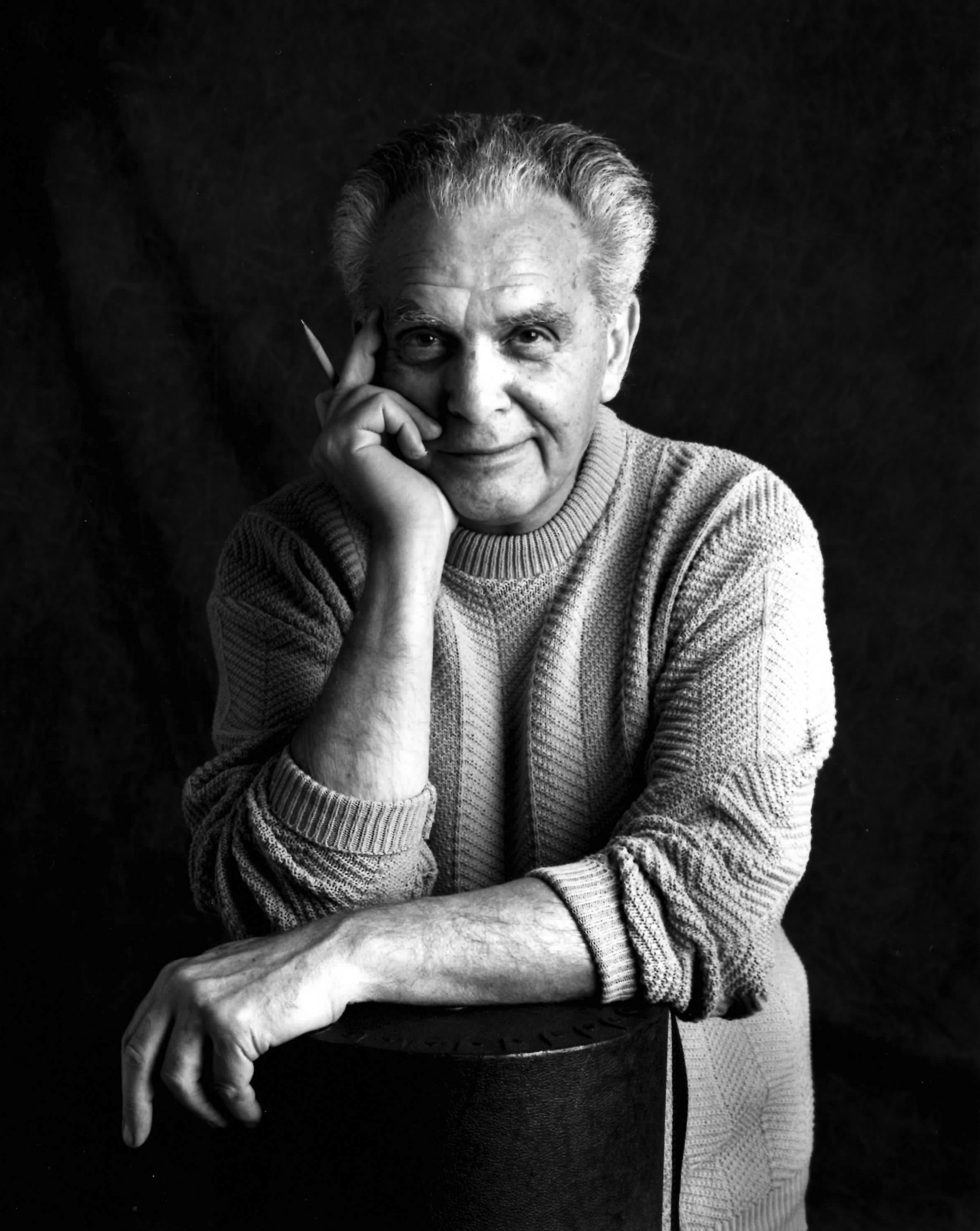
Jack Kirby

- August 3 – Les Elgart, bandleader (died 1995)
- August 6 – Robert Mitchum, actor (died 1997)
- August 10 – Morgan Porteus, clergyman (died 2019)
- August 11
  - Dik Browne, cartoonist (died 1989)
  - Jack Smith, American football end (died 2015)
- August 12
  - LeRoy Grannis, surfing photographer (died 2011)
  - Marjorie Reynolds, actress (died 1997)
- August 14 – Marty Glickman, sports announcer (died 2001)
- August 17 – Walter Brown, blues shouter (died 1956)
- August 18
  - Zvi Keren Israeli pianist, musicologist and composer (died 2008 in Israel)
  - Caspar Weinberger, U.S. Secretary of Defense from 1981 to 1987 and Secretary of Health, Education, and Welfare from 1973 to 1975 (died 2006)
- August 21 – Esther Cooper Jackson, African American civil rights activist (died 2022)
- August 22
  - John Lee Hooker, African American blues singer-songwriter (died 2001)
  - Raymond G. Perelman, businessman and philanthropist (died 2019)
- August 23
  - Marjorie G. Horning, biochemist and pharmacologist (died 2020)
  - Tex Williams, country singer (died 1985)
- August 24 – Dennis James, game show host (died 1997)
- August 25 – Mel Ferrer, film actor, director and producer (died 2008)
- August 28 – Jack Kirby, comic book artist (died 1994)
- August 29 – Isabel Sanford, African American television actress (died 2004)
- September 5 – Art Rupe, record producer (died 2022)
- September 11 – Donald Blakeslee, aviator (died 2008)
- September 13 – Robert Ward, composer (died 2013)
- September 15
  - Carola B. Eisenberg, psychiatrist and educator (died 2021)
  - Buddy Jeannette, basketball player and coach (died 1998)
- September 18 – June Foray, voice actress best known for "Rocky and Bullwinkle" (died 2017)
- September 20 – Red Auerbach, basketball coach and official (died 2006)
- September 25 – Johnny Sain, baseball player (died 2006)
- September 27 – Louis Auchincloss, novelist (died 2010)
- September 30 – Buddy Rich, jazz drummer (died 1987)

=== October–November ===
- October 3 – Les Schwab, businessman (died 2007)
- October 5 – Allen Ludden, game show host (died 1981)
- October 6 – Fannie Lou Hamer, African American civil rights activist (died 1977)
- October 7
  - June Allyson, actress (died 2006)
  - Virginia Newell, mathematician and politician (died 2025)
- October 8 – Danny Murtaugh, baseball player and manager (died 1976)
- October 9 – Don Marion Davis, child actor (died 2020)
- October 10 – Thelonious Monk, African American jazz pianist and composer considered "one of the giants of American music" (died 1982)
- October 11 – J. Edward McKinley, character actor (died 2004)
- October 13 – George Osmond, Osmond family patriarch (died 2007)
- October 15
  - Adele Stimmel Chase, artist (died 2000)
  - Jan Miner, actress (died 2004)
  - Arthur M. Schlesinger, Jr., historian and political commentator (died 2007)
  - Ralph Solecki, archaeologist (died 2019)
- October 16 – Alice Pearce, actress (died 1966)
- October 17 – Marsha Hunt, actress (died 2022)
- October 21 – Dizzy Gillespie, African American jazz trumpet player, bandleader, singer and composer (died 1993)
- November 1 – Clarence E. Miller, politician (died 2011)
- November 4 – Leonardo Cimino, actor (died 2012)
- November 6 – Harlan Warde, character actor (died 1980)
- November 11 – Tony F. Schneider, naval officer (died 2010)
- November 12 – Jo Stafford, pop singer (died 2008)
- November 13 – Robert Sterling, actor (died 2006)
- November 20 – Robert Byrd, U.S. Senator from West Virginia from 1959 to 2010 (died 2010)
- November 25 – Stanley Wilson, incidental music composer (died 1970)
- November 27 – Buffalo Bob Smith, children's television host (died 1998)
- November 28 – Orville Rogers, pilot and marathons runner (died 2019)

=== December ===
- December 1 – Marty Marion, baseball player and manager (died 2011)
- December 4 – Arthur B. Singer, American wildlife artist (died 1990)
- December 9 – James Rainwater, physicist, recipient of the Nobel Prize in Physics in 1975 (died 1986)
- December 13 – John Hart, American actor (died 2009)
- December 20
  - David Bohm, theoretical physicist, philosopher and neuropsychologist (died 1992 in the United Kingdom)
  - Audrey Totter, film actress (died 2013)
- December 22 – Gene Rayburn, television personality (Match Game) (died 1999)
- December 30 – Seymour Melman, industrial engineer (died 2004)

== Deaths ==
- January 10 – Buffalo Bill (William F. Cody), frontiersman, bison hunter and showman (born 1846)
- January 16 – George Dewey, U.S. Admiral of the Navy (born 1837)
- January 21 – Francesca Alexander, illustrator (born 1837)
- February 21 – Fred Mace, silent film actor (born 1878)
- March 13 – Samuel Pasco, U.S. Senator from Florida from 1887 to 1899 (born 1834 in the United Kingdom)
- March 28 – Albert Pinkham Ryder, painter (born 1847)
- April 1 – Scott Joplin, African American ragtime composer and pianist (born 1867–68)
- April 8 – Richard Olney, politician (born 1835)
- April 13 – Diamond Jim Brady, businessman (born 1856)
- April 23 – Robert Koehler, painter (born 1850 in Germany)
- May 19 – Alexander Caldwell, U.S. Senator from Kansas from 1871 to 1873 (born 1830)
- May 29 – Kate Harrington, teacher, writer and poet (born 1831)
- June 14 – Thomas W. Benoist, aviation pioneer (born 1874)
- July 28 – Stephen Luce, admiral (born 1827)
- August 15 – Martha Capps Oliver, poet and hymnwriter (born 1845)
- August 17 – John W. Kern, U.S. Senator from Indiana from 1911 to 1917 (born 1849)
- October 13 – Florence La Badie, silent film actress (automobile accident; born 1888)
- November 3 – Frederick Rodgers, admiral (born 1842)
- November 15 – John W. Foster, journalist and politician (born 1836)
- November 23 – William Ralph Emerson, architect (born 1833)
- December 9 – Nat M. Wills, vaudeville performer (accidental CO poisoning; born 1873)
- December 12 – Andrew Taylor Still, "father of osteopathy" (born 1828)
- December 22 – Frances Xavier Cabrini, religious sister, first American canonized as a saint (born 1850 in Italy)
- December 28 – John Thornton, U.S. Senator from Louisiana from 1910 to 1915 (born 1846)

== See also ==
- List of American films of 1917
- Timeline of United States history (1900–1929)
