= A Capitol Fourth =

PBS concert broadcast

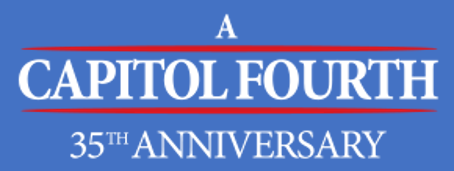
- 35th anniversary
- Genre: Music/performing arts
- Opening theme: "The Star-Spangled Banner" (except 1986); 1812 Overture (1986 only)
- Ending theme: 1812 Overture (except 1986) "The Star-Spangled Banner" (1986 only)
- Country of origin: United States
- Original language: English
- No. of episodes: 41

Production
- Production locations: National Mall, Washington, D.C. (1980–2019; 2022–present); broadcast but not live (2020–2021)
- Camera setup: Multi-camera
- Running time: 90 minutes

Original release
- Network: PBS
- Release: July 4, 1980 – present

A Capitol Fourth is an annual Independence Day concert special broadcast by PBS. It is presented from the west lawn of the United States Capitol Building in Washington, D.C., and is also simulcast by the American Forces Network.

The concert typically features performances by guest musicians, as well as the 3rd U.S. Infantry Regiment (The Old Guard), the Presidential Salute Battery, the U.S. Army Band (Pershing's Own), the National Symphony Orchestra, Patrick Lundy and The Ministers of Music, U.S. Army Herald Trumpets and the Choral Arts Society of Washington.

One journalist described the event as "a mix of patriotism and pop culture ... as the National Symphony Orchestra launched into Tchaikovsky's 1812 Overture with accompaniment from an Army artillery squad, a spectacular fireworks display erupted over the Washington Monument. There was something special about being in the nation's capital on Independence Day, surrounded by a few hundred thousand of our fellow citizens."

== History ==
The National Symphony Orchestra began performing Independence Day concerts on the west lawn in 1979. Two years later, the first concert telecast was hosted by E. G. Marshall, with conductor Mstislav Rostropovich and performer Pearl Bailey. It has since become the highest-rated show on PBS.

In 2005, A Capitol Fourth begins to broadcast in high definition, with broadcasts in a letterboxed format for viewers with standard-definition television sets watching via either cable or satellite television. The program also introduced a new graphics package to HD.

In 2019, the concert was held alongside Salute to America, a separate Independence Day event organized primarily by then-President Donald Trump. The organizers of A Capitol Fourth indicated that their show remains an independent production that is not affiliated with Trump's event.

In 2020, the in-person concert was cancelled due to the COVID-19 pandemic, although some performances were still recorded live remotely. The special instead incorporated pre-recorded performances (including one that paid tribute to first responders), although the fireworks on the Capitol were still broadcast live. Although restrictions have since been lifted in Washington, D.C., the in-person concert was cancelled again for 2021, as the show had already been planned in advance under the presumption that the in-person concert could not be held. In 2022, the show returned to the West Lawn of the Capitol after two years of cancellation of the in-person concert.

In 2026, the concert was held on July 3 instead of July 4 to commemorate the country's 250th anniversary.

== Cast ==
=== Hosts ===
Tony Danza has served as host twice, in 1998 and 2007. Barry Bostwick hosted during several consecutive years prior to 2006, when Jason Alexander hosted. After Danza's second time, Jimmy Smits hosted for the following four years. Tom Bergeron hosted from 2012 to 2014, and again in 2016. Bradley Whitford served as host in 2015. John Stamos hosted in 2017, 2018, and 2019, and co-hosted with Vanessa Williams in 2020. Williams hosted the show in 2021, and also performed "God Bless America" and "Lift Every Voice and Sing". The 2022 edition was hosted by Mickey Guyton. Alfonso Ribiero hosted the concert since 2023. Erich Kunzel was music director until his death in 2009. Jack Everly took over as music director.

=== Performers ===
Performers over the years have included Roberta Flack and Marvin Hamlisch (1987); Suzy Bogguss (1998); Lee Ann Womack and Ray Charles (2000); Chuck Berry, Aaron Carter and Aretha Franklin (2002); John Williams, Dolly Parton and Kristin Chenoweth (2003); Robin Gibb and Clay Aiken (2004); Stevie Wonder (2006); Hayden Panettiere, Little Richard, and Bebe Neuwirth (2007); Huey Lewis and the News, Taylor Hicks, and Jerry Lee Lewis (2008); Aretha Franklin, Barry Manilow, Andrew von Oeyen, and the cast of Jersey Boys (2009); Gladys Knight, Lang Lang, and Reba McEntire (2010); Jordin Sparks, Kelli O'Hara, Matthew Morrison, Steve Martin, and the Steep Canyon Rangers; Josh Groban, Little Richard, and the cast of Million Dollar Quartet (2011); Megan Hilty, Phillip Phillips, Matthew Broderick, Kelli O’Hara, Javier Colón, Kool & the Gang, Apolo Ohno, and John Williams (2012); and Williams, Hilty, Manilow, Neil Diamond, Jackie Evancho, Candice Glover, Scotty McCreery, and the cast of Motown: The Musical (2013).

The 2017 performers included The Beach Boys (with Mark McGrath and host John Stamos, who played drums and guitar), The Four Tops, Dan Aykroyd and Jim Belushi as The Blues Brothers, Kellie Pickler (her dress rehearsal performance was shown due to Pickler's illness), Trace Adkins, Yolanda Adams, Chris Blue, Sam Moore, Laura Osnes, and Sofia Carson, who performed the national anthem.

The 2025 edition marks The Beach Boys' first televised performance since the death of founder and member Brian Wilson.

=== Traditions ===
The concert usually begins with the American national anthem by a recording artist, accompanied by the National Symphony Orchestra and the U.S. Army Herald Trumpets while the last line "and the home of the brave" was sung with a choir. In recent years, the performance of the national anthem has been preceded by the playing of "The Stars and Stripes Forever". Following live entertainment, its finale begins with a rendition of Tchaikovsky's 1812 Overture by the National Symphony Orchestra (complete with cannon fire from the United States Army Presidential Salute Guns Battery and the concluding verse sung by the Choral Arts Society of Washington), and the National Park Service's fireworks show above the Washington Monument. Following the 1812 Overture, "Let Freedom Ring" was sung and a series of John Philip Sousa's best-known marches are played by the United States Army Band and the U.S. Army Herald Trumpets.

The sole exception was in 1986 when 1812 Overture opened that year's concert, concluding with the national anthem sung by 5 military chorus groups conducted by Henry Mancini and the national symphony orchestra.

=== National anthem performers ===
- 1980: Pearl Bailey
- 1981: Ella Fitzgerald
- 1986: 5 Military Chorus groups conducted by Henry Mancini (performed for the finale)
- 1987: Jon Vickers
- 1992: SGT. Alvie Powell
- 1996: SGT. Michael S. Ryan
- 1998: Sandi Patty
- 2000: Audra McDonald
- 2003: Barry Bostwick
- 2004: Clay Aiken
- 2006: JoJo
- 2007: Hayden Panettiere
- 2009: Aretha Franklin
- 2010: David Archuleta
- 2011: Jordin Sparks
- 2012: Josh Turner
- 2013: Jackie Evancho
- 2014: The Joint Armed Forces Chorus and Choral Arts Society of Washington conducted by John Williams
- 2015: Nicole Scherzinger
- 2016: Alisan Porter
- 2017: Sofia Carson
- 2018: Kyla Jade
- 2019: Maelyn Jarmon
- 2020: Mandy Gonzalez
- 2021: Renée Fleming
- 2022: Mickey Guyton
- 2023: Ruthie Ann Miles
- 2024: Fantasia
- 2025: Yolanda Adams
- 2026: Carly Pearce

== The National Artistic Achievement Award ==
The National Artistic Achievement Award has been presented on six occasions during the program for the performer's "dedication to enriching the national legacy of the performing arts":

- 2003: John Williams
- 2005: Gloria Estefan & Emilio Estefan
- 2006: Stevie Wonder
- 2010: Reba McEntire
- 2011: Josh Groban
- 2018: The Beach Boys

== See also ==
- National Memorial Day Concert
