= State visits to the United States =

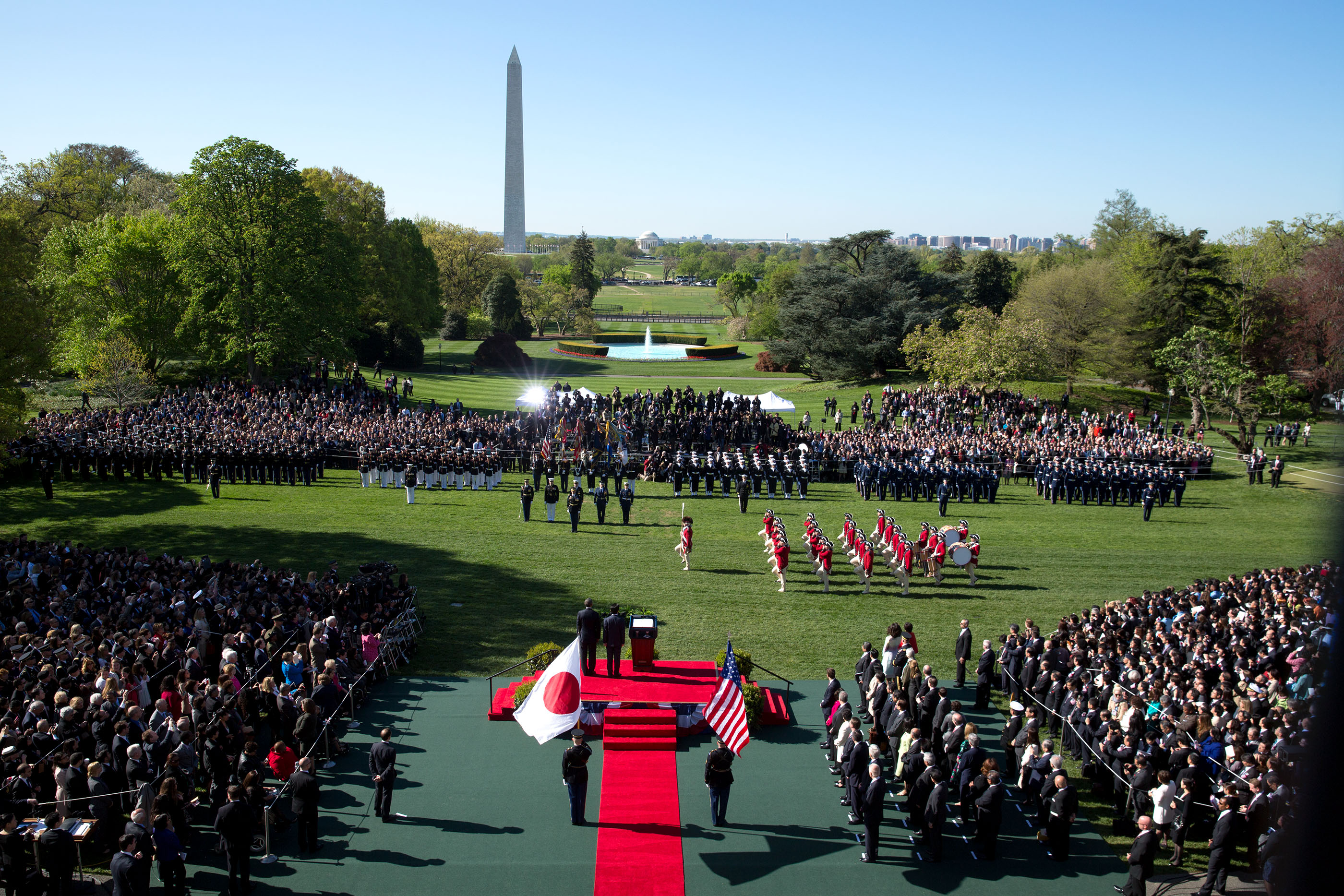
The White House arrival ceremony is a central component of state visits to the United States.

State and official visits to the United States are formal visits by the head of state (state visit) or chief of government (official visit) from one country to the United States, during which the president of the United States acts as official host of the visitor. State visits are considered to be the highest expression of friendly bilateral relations between the United States and a foreign state and are, in general, characterized by an emphasis on official public ceremonies.

The first visit of a foreign state to the United States was the state visit of the then-independent Kingdom of Hawaii in 1874; this was followed by the state visit of Brazil in 1876. Since then, numerous heads of state and government have been formally received by the president of the United States in Washington. In addition to, and more frequently than, state and official visits, the United States also receives foreign dignitaries on official working visits, which are primarily functional trips that occur with less or no ceremony.

== Background ==
=== Terminology ===
State visits are visits to the United States led by a foreign head of state acting in his or her sovereign capacity. They are, therefore, described as a "visit of [name of state]". State visits can only occur on the invitation of the president of the United States, acting in his capacity as head of the United States.

Official visits, in contrast, are usually visits by the chief of government of a foreign state. Like state visits, they can only occur on the invitation of the president of the United States, though are offered in the president's capacity as chief of the federal government of the United States. The visit of a crown prince may also be classified as an official visit. Both state and official visits generally consist of a four-day stay in Washington by the visitor, during which a range of welcoming ceremonies are performed. They are often followed by a tour.

State visits to the United States are always reciprocated, at a later time, with a state visit by the United States. U.S. diplomatic policy is to host no more than one state visit from any single nation in a four-year period. Because of these rules, some visits of foreign states with executive presidents may be classified as official visits, instead of state visits.

There are, in addition, working visits and official working visits, which are of a largely functional nature and done to conduct business, such as negotiations, consultations, or treaty signings.

Private visits are visits of a head of state or chief of government to the United States for personal reasons, such as a holiday or for medical treatment.

=== History and purpose ===
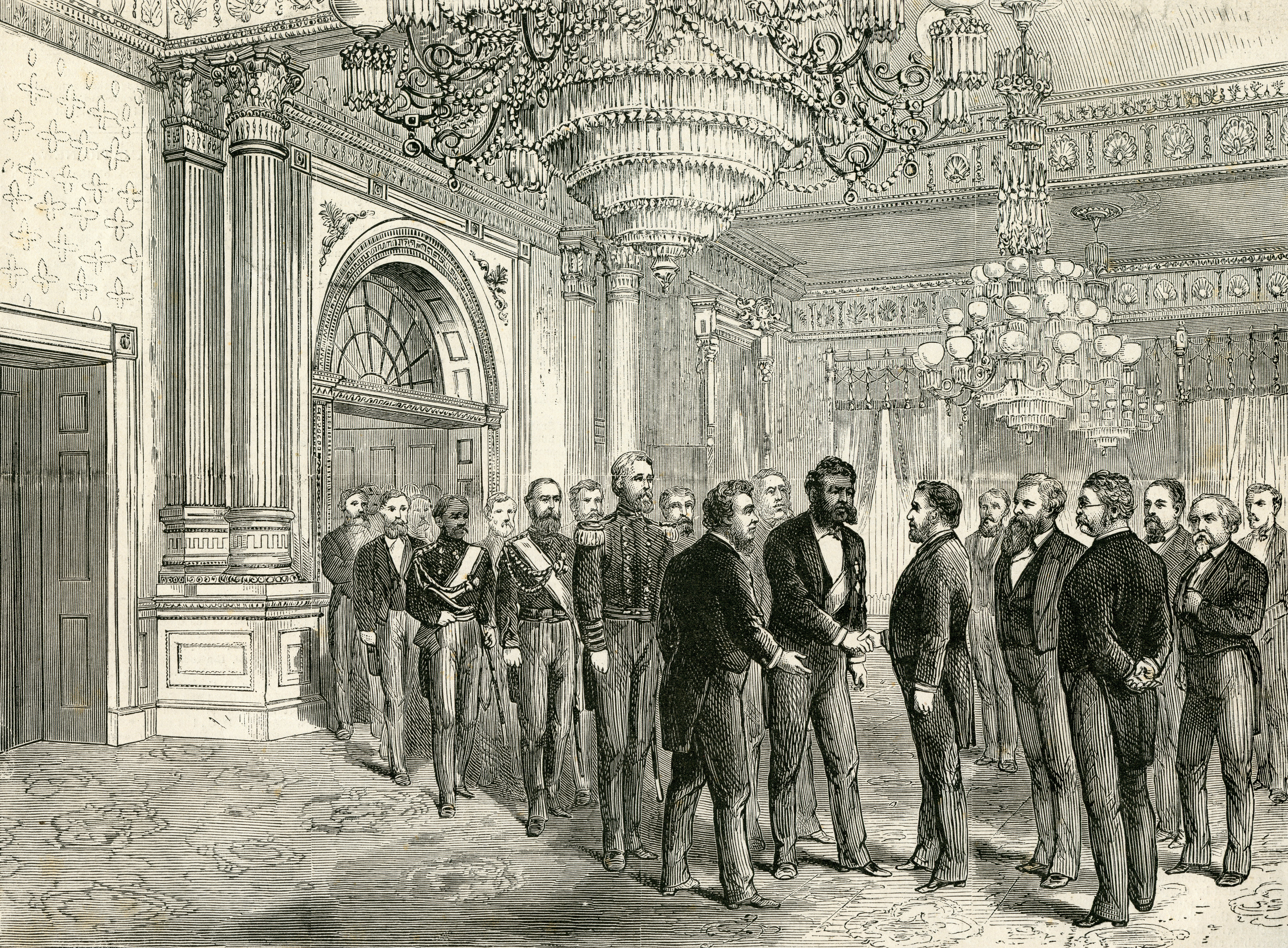
Kalākaua is received by Ulysses Grant during the visit of Hawaii in 1874.

Due, perhaps, to the geographic isolation of the United States, the first visit by a foreign head of state occurred nearly one hundred years after independence, when President Ulysses S. Grant received King Kalākaua of the Kingdom of Hawaii in December 1874. (Note: Albert Edward, Prince of Wales, later Edward VII of the United Kingdom, had visited Washington during his North American tour in 1860; while in Washington, he stayed in the White House as the guest of President James Buchanan for three days. However, as the Prince of Wales was not himself the head of state, this was not accounted a state visit, and records do not reflect this as an official visit either.) This was followed, two years later, with a visit by Emperor Dom Pedro II of the Empire of Brazil, again received by Grant.

State and official visits have sometimes been controversial. A discussed 1995 state visit by China, for example, never materialized after the administration of Bill Clinton decided it was unwilling to face the criticism from Congress and others that such an invitation would prompt. President Clinton extended a private invitation to General Secretary of the Chinese Communist Party Jiang Zemin for a less formal meeting at the White House, but the Chinese government (represented by Foreign Minister Qian Qichen) declined, "based not on any substantive disagreement, but on China's insistence that Mr. Jiang deserved a formal state." Jiang met with Clinton at the United Nations General Assembly in New York in October 1995, but there was no Chinese state visit to the U.S. until 1997.

Declining or canceling an invitation to a state or official visit can be interpreted as a rebuke of the United States on the international stage. In 1986, for instance, Hassan II of Morocco canceled a visit to Washington, D.C. Though the Moroccan government cited the king's personal fatigue as the reason, the cancellation was widely perceived as an expression of irritation with the U.S.' criticism over Moroccan relations with Gaddafi's Libya. In 2013, Brazilian President Dilma Rousseff canceled a planned state visit to the United States, after revelations that the U.S. National Security Agency had spied on her communications and the communications of other Brazilian government officials.

== Ceremonial activities ==
A wide variety of ceremonial activities occur during visits to the United States. The specific order of occurrence will vary based on the visitor's itinerary, and is determined in advance during pre-visit negotiations between protocol officials of the United States and the visiting state. The activities allowed and the form they take proceed generally according to a schedule that accounts for the visitor's rank and the nature of the visit.

	Rank of visitor	Customary length	Flight line ceremony	White House dinner	State department luncheon	White House arrival ceremony	Pentagon arrival ceremony	Exchange of diplomatic gifts	Invitation to stay at Blair House	Flag streetlining	Address to Congress
State visit	head of state	4 days	Yes	Yes (white tie)	Maybe (tenue de ville)	Yes (21-gun salute)	No	Yes	Yes	Yes	Maybe (congressional decision)
Official visit	chief of government	4 days	Yes	Yes (black tie)	Yes (tenue de ville)	Yes (19-gun salute)	No	Yes	Yes	Yes	Maybe (congressional decision)
Official working visit	head of state or chief of government	3 days	Yes	Maybe (black tie)	Yes (tenue de ville)	No	Yes (19-gun salute)	No	Maybe	No	Maybe (congressional decision)
Working visit	head of state or chief of government	3 days	Yes	No	Maybe (tenue de ville)	No	No	No	Maybe	No	Maybe (congressional decision)
Private visit	head of state or chief of government	no customary length	No	No	No	No	No	No	No	No	No

The march-on of the military escort prior to a White House arrival in 2015

=== Flight line ceremony ===
A visiting head of state or chief of government will typically arrive, via aircraft, at Joint Base Andrews. When the visitor's aircraft has completed taxiing, a ground crew will move air stairs into position at the aircraft's door and unroll a red carpet. A military cordon, consisting of an approximately equal number of personnel from the 3rd United States Infantry Regiment, the U.S. Navy Ceremonial Guard, the U.S. Coast Guard Ceremonial Honor Guard, and the U.S. Air Force Honor Guard will form, flanking either side of the red carpet.

For visiting heads of state the cordon will consist of twenty-one personnel; for chiefs of government, nineteen. In front of the cordon, closer to the aircraft stairs, a welcoming committee will form in a line. Two officers from the Joint Colour Guard will hold sticks attached to the flag of the United States and the flag of the visiting country. The welcoming committee consists of the United States Chief of Protocol, the United States ambassador to the visiting state, the visiting state's ambassador to the United States, the commanding general of Joint Base Andrews, and two or three prominent personages designated by the Chief of Protocol.

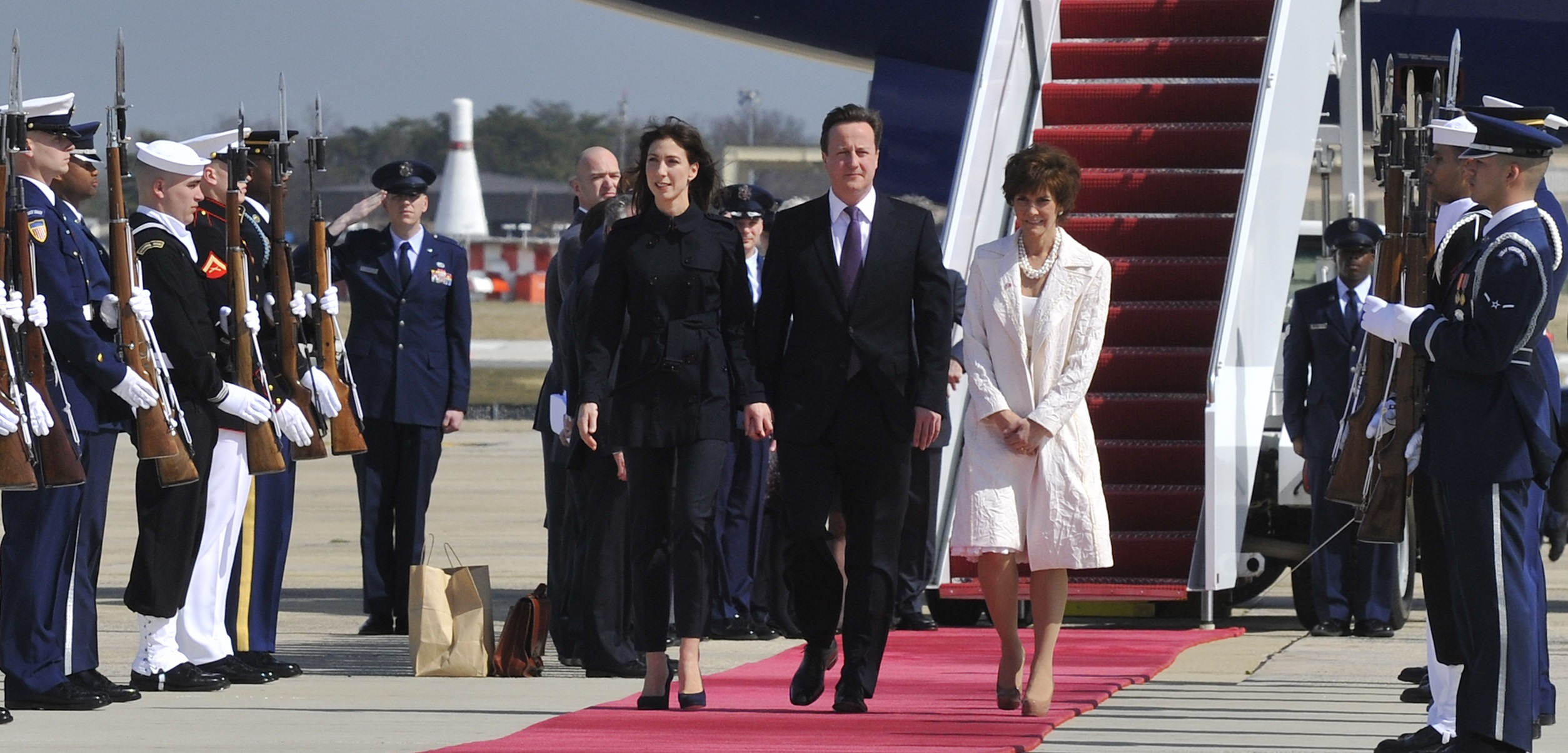
David Cameron walks down the red carpet during a flight line arrival ceremony in 2012. On the right is Capricia Marshall, Chief of Protocol of the United States.

As the visitor walks down the air stairs, the U.S. Air Force Band performs "Arrival Fanfare Number One". At the bottom of the stairs, the visitor will be greeted by an American schoolchild with a bouquet of flowers, before being introduced to the welcoming committee by the chief of protocol. The national anthems of the visiting state and the United States will be performed prior to the visitor's departure, by car, to the President's Guest House, or other accommodations.

=== Arrival ceremony ===
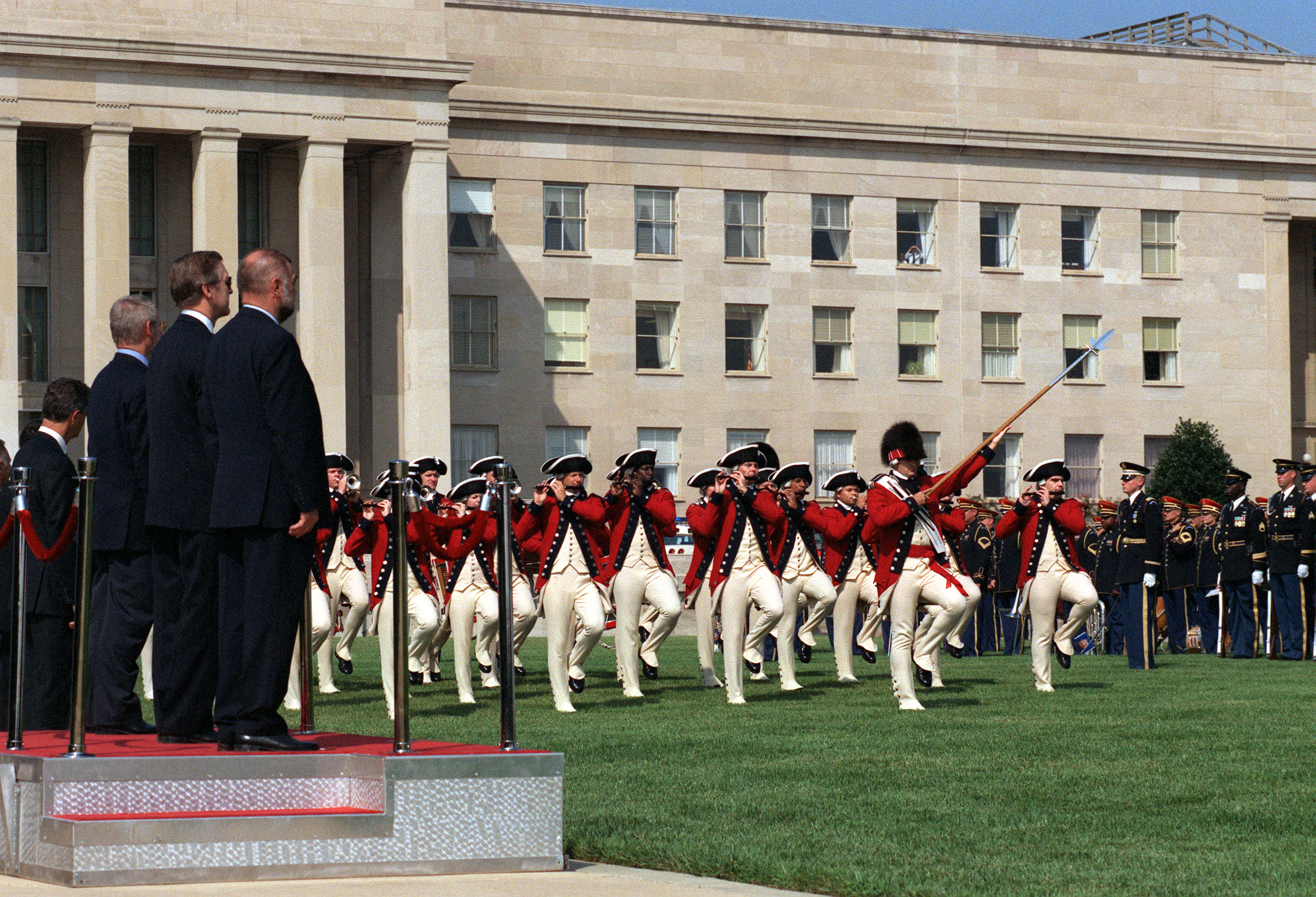
An arrival ceremony at the Pentagon

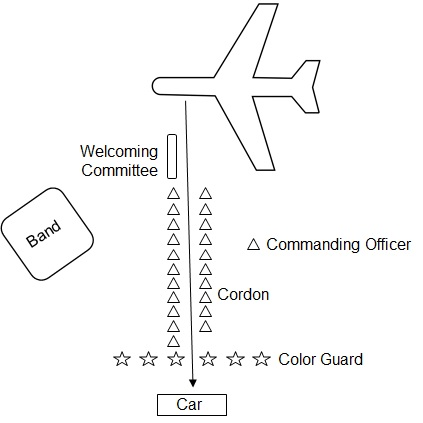
A diagram showing the position of units for a flight line ceremony for a visiting head-of-state

For state and official visits, a formal arrival ceremony will typically be hosted by the president on the South Lawn of the White House the morning after the dignitary arrives in the United States. The arrival ceremony was added to the program of the state visit in the 1940s. The Chief Usher of the White House is principally responsible for arrangements of the arrival ceremony.

The arrival ceremony is conducted by a civilian welcoming committee, as well as a large number of military personnel drawn from the 3rd U.S. Infantry Regiment, Alpha Company from the garrison of Marine Barracks Washington, the U.S. Navy Ceremonial Guard, the U.S. Air Force Honor Guard, the U.S. Coast Guard Ceremonial Honor Guard, the White House sentries, and other selected personnel.

For official working visits, a different arrival ceremony is held at the parade ground of the Pentagon, instead of the South Lawn of the White House. The presiding official of this form of arrival ceremony is the United States Secretary of Defense, instead of the president.

During the White House arrival ceremony, Presidential Salute Battery fires cannon volleys from a firing position in President's Park during the performance of the visiting state's national anthem.

==== Order of events for a White House arrival ====
Event	Image	Musical selection	Description
President's arrival	Barack Obama arrives for the arrival ceremony during the state visit of China in 2015.	Ruffles and flourishes and Hail to the Chief	Shortly before the scheduled arrival of the visiting dignitary, the President of the United States will exit the White House through the Diplomatic Reception Room.
Visitor's arrival	"Call to Statesmanship" is performed as Felipe Calderón's car arrives at the White House during the 2010 state visit of Mexico.	Call to Statesmanship	Military footmen will open the doors to the visitor's vehicle upon its arrival. The White House stopped employing civilian footmen in about 1950.
Welcome	Chinese leader Hu Jintao is introduced to the welcoming committee in 2011.	none	After an exchange of greetings, the President and First Lady will introduce the visitor and his or her spouse to the welcoming committee, who are positioned to the right of the reviewing stand. The welcoming committee consists of the Vice-President of the United States, the Cabinet of the United States, and the Joint Chiefs of Staff.
Honors	The U.S. Navy Band plays "Deutschlandlied" and "The Star-Spangled Banner" during an arrival ceremony.	visitor anthem and "The Star-Spangled Banner"	Honors are rendered to the visiting state. The military escort is brought to attention. The duty band, either the U.S. Marine Band, the U.S. Navy Band, the U.S. Air Force Band, or the U.S. Army Band, performs the visitor national anthem, during which the Presidential Salute Battery fires 72mm howitzer rounds from a firing position in President's Park (21 rounds for heads of state and 19 rounds for chiefs of government). Following this, the United States national anthem is performed.
Inspection	Donald Trump and Scott Morrison inspect the troops during an official visit in 2019.	varies	Following the performance of the national anthems, the president and the visitor will inspect the military escort. The inspection is carried out to a march performed by the duty band. Typical selections include Nobles of the Mystic Shrine, Architect of Victory, King Cotton, Hands Across the Sea, or Manhattan Beach.
Review	The Old Guard Fife and Drum Corps switch to a troop step to cross in front of the president's dais.	Yankee Doodle (The British Grenadiers for visits of the United Kingdom only) (Note: The Fife and Drum Corps played Yankee Doodle during the procession phase of the state visit made by King Charles III in May 2026.)	When the President and visitor have returned to the reviewing stand, the fife and drum corps of the 3rd United States Infantry Regiment will conduct a pass-in-review. The corps marches at normal step but briefly switches to the more formal troop step to cross in front of the dais.
Salutatory	Australian prime minister John Howard responds to George W. Bush's welcoming remarks during an official visit in 2006.	none	Following the pass in review, the President delivers remarks welcoming the visitor, to which the visitor then responds.
Procession	Barack Obama leads David Cameron, Michelle Obama, and Samantha Cameron in the procession to the Blue Room in 2012.	Presidential Processional	The President and the visitor proceed to the White House via the Blue Room. In the event the visitor is elderly or infirm, the procession may enter through the ground floor Diplomatic Reception Room, instead.
Signing the guestbook	François Hollande signs the guestbook during the state visit of France in 2014.	none	Inside the Blue Room, the visitor will be asked to register in the White House guestbook.
Exchange of gifts	The Red Room during the administration of Bill Clinton	none	The president and visitor will move to the Red Room, where diplomatic gifts will be exchanged. The actual gifts will have been placed in advance by protocol officers and are not physically handled, but rather viewed. The gift to the United States is later transferred to the National Archives for appraisal, except for gifts of food, which are destroyed.
Luncheon	Gerald and Betty Ford during the luncheon with Queen Elizabeth II and Prince Philip after the conclusion of the state arrival ceremony	none	If no State Department luncheon is planned, the state arrival concludes with a private luncheon held in the Family Dining Room. If a State Department luncheon is planned, the visitor is instead conducted to the Oval Office for a photo portrait before departing for Foggy Bottom.

=== Blair House ===
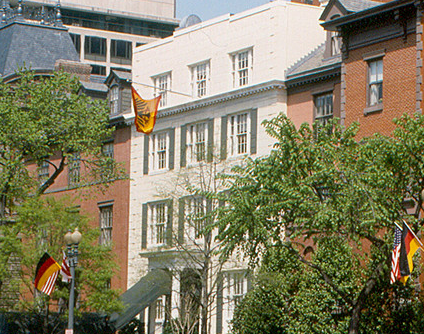
The German presidential standard is displayed outside the President's Guest House during the 1992 visit of Richard von Weizsäcker.

During state and official visits, the visitor will be invited to use the President's Guest House, also known as Blair House, a 119-room guesthouse complex across the street from the White House. During the residence of a foreign dignitary, the dignitary's official standard is displayed on the building's flagpole. In cases of dignitaries who do not have official standards, the respective nation's flag is displayed instead. On occasions where two or more foreign visitors of equal rank are visiting Washington, neither are invited to stay at the President's Guest House. The policy is in place to avoid the perception of favoritism.

Some visiting dignitaries with whom the sitting president has a personal relationship have been invited to stay in the guest quarters at the White House, a suite of rooms in the southeast corner of the second floor of the White House that includes the Lincoln Bedroom and Queens' Bedroom, plus their adjoining sitting rooms, dressing rooms and bathrooms. These are separated from the president's apartments by a staircase landing. During the presidency of Bill Clinton, Queen Sonja of Norway and British Prime Minister John Major both stayed in the White House guest quarters, instead of the President's Guest House.

=== Department of State luncheon ===
Official and official working visits, as well as some state visits led by an executive president, generally include a luncheon at Foggy Bottom, which will be jointly hosted by the Vice President of the United States and the United States Secretary of State. The president of the United States does not attend. Luncheons typically follow the White House or Pentagon arrival ceremony and are held in the Benjamin Franklin State Dining Room. They are served in three courses.

=== State dinner ===
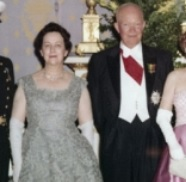
Dwight D. Eisenhower wearing the cordon and plaque of the Grand Croix of the Legion of Honor at the state dinner for France in 1960

A dinner at the White House is held in the evening after the White House arrival ceremony in the case of state and official visits. Dinners are appropriately referred to as state dinners whether or not they occur during a state or official visit. The name, in this case, refers to the rank of the host of the dinner (the president of the United States), not the visitor.

The dress code for state dinners is determined in advance by the White House Social Secretary in consultation with the Office of the First Lady of the United States. Black tie or mess dress is usually prescribed for state dinners during official visits. State dinners during state visits may be either black tie or mess dress, or white tie with decorations or mess dress. The president of the United States has not customarily worn decorations, with some exceptions as in cases where he has been invested into an order of the visiting state. Where applicable, visitors may wear national costume instead of evening dress. Visitors from socialist states, including Nikita Khrushchev and Hu Jintao, have, in the past, refused to wear evening dress.

Dinners are typically held in the State Dining Room. Those for which guests exceeding the capacity of the room have been invited may overflow into the adjoining Red Room. On some occasions, weather permitting, the dinner is held outdoors, such as during the official visit of Chancellor Ludwig Erhard in 1964 or the state visit of the United Kingdom in 1976.

Guests at White House state dinners are seated at ten-person round tables. The practice of using a large number of round tables, instead of one or a few long banquet tables, was initiated by Jacqueline Kennedy.

==== Order of events for a state dinner ====
Event	Image	Musical selection	Description
Arrival	Barack and Michelle Obama greet Matteo Renzi for a 2016 state dinner.	none	The visiting dignitary and their spouse or guest will arrive, by car, at the North Portico of the White House, where they are greeted by the President of the United States and First Lady of the United States. Previously, this was reserved exclusively for visiting heads of state, while heads of government would be met by the Chief of Protocol and brought into the foyer to be greeted by the First Couple. However, this has changed in recent years, and the First Couple greets all visitors at the North Portico.
Reception	Former president of the United States Jimmy Carter speaks to Hu Jintao and Barack Obama at the reception in the Yellow Oval Room during the state visit of China in 2011.	none	A reception is held in the Yellow Oval Room attended by those guests who will be seated at the head table.
Presidential Entrance March	Barack Obama and Shinzo Abe move from the White House's second floor to the state floor for dinner.	Hail, America	The president and visitor move from the second floor to the state floor of the White House via the Grand Staircase in a short transit ceremony known as the Presidential Entrance March.
Receiving	Barack Obama and Indian prime minister Manmohan Singh greet Michaele and Tareq Salahi in the receiving line in the Blue Room.	none	Guests are individually announced by a military social aide and enter the Blue Room where they are greeted by the president and visitor before being seated in the State Dining Room.
Toast	George Bush exchanges toasts with Queen Elizabeth II in 2007.	none	Once all guests are seated, the White House press corps will be escorted into the state dining room and the president will deliver a toast to the visitor, which the visitor will then reciprocate. At the conclusion of the toasts, the press corps will be escorted out of the room again and dinner service will begin.
Dinner	A calligraphy menu for a state dinner at the White House during the last official visit by Junichiro Koizumi in June 2006. The Clinton china service is being used.	none	Dinner is served on the White House china and menus are individually hand-engraved by the White House Graphics and Calligraphy Office. White House state and official dinners are served in four courses. Prior to the dessert course, finger bowls will be distributed. Because the use of finger bowls is no longer customary in the United States, their placement at White House dinners can sometimes cause confusion among guests who are not part of Society and White House butlers are attentive to guests who appear confused. On one occasion, a dinner guest during the administration of Franklin Roosevelt misunderstood the finger bowl to be a beverage and drank from it; to spare the guest embarrassment, Eleanor Roosevelt also drank from hers. Traditionally, tables have been segregated by gender, however, during the administrations of Jimmy Carter and Barack Obama, married couples were permitted to be seated together.
Recession	Barack Obama and Shinzo Abe lead the recession to the East Room in 2015.	varies	At the conclusion of the dessert course, the President of the United States and the visitor will lead a recession of the guests down the Cross Hall and into the East Room of the White House. The U.S. Marine Corps Chamber Orchestra, the U.S. Army Strolling Strings, or the U.S. Air Force Strolling Strings form a cordon down the Cross Hall, and perform a recessional.
Performance	Dianne Reeves performs in the East Room of the White House in 2012.	varies	In the East Room, a performance of approximately 20 to 30 minutes length will be held. In modern times, entertainment is typically provided by a prominent American celebrity musician. Recent performances have included Kenny Chesney, Yo-Yo Ma, Ne-Yo, and Jennifer Hudson.
Social dancing	John Travolta dances with Diana, Princess of Wales in the Entrance Hall at a 1985 dinner for the Prince of Wales during the administration of Ronald Reagan.	varies	Following the performance, guests will be invited to remove to the Entrance Hall where sparkling wine will be served (in keeping with a policy instituted during the administration of John F. Kennedy, champagne and other non-American wines are not served at the White House). Social dancing will also occur, with music provided by the United States Marine Band's jazz ensemble. This portion of the program may be omitted if the visitor is elderly, or social dancing would otherwise be inappropriate, such as during a state visit by the Vatican.

==== Return dinner ====
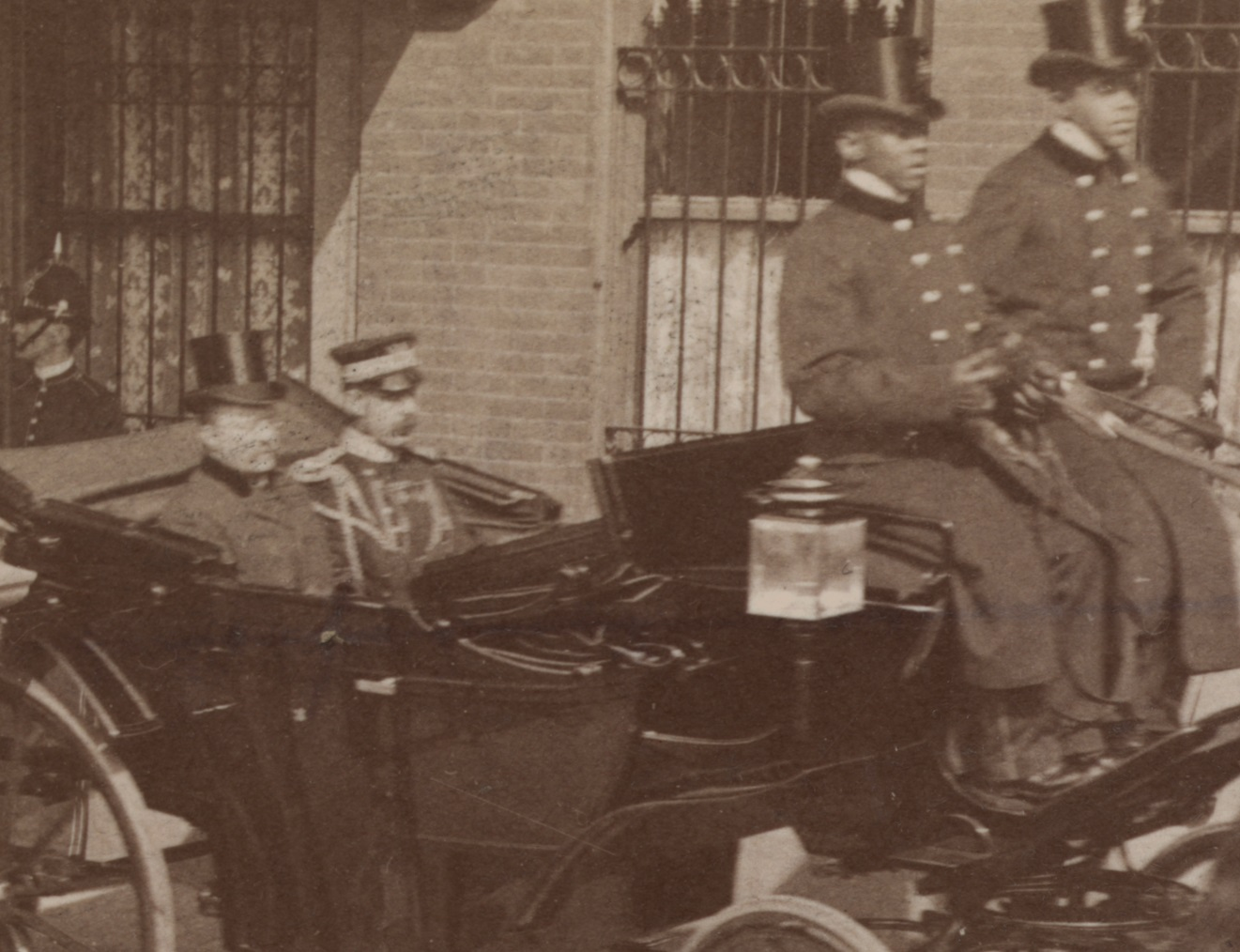
Theodore Roosevelt and aide de camp Col. Bingham depart the chancery of the German embassy in the presidential state coach following a return visit to Prince Henry of Prussia in 1902.

The evening following the state or official dinner, it is customary for the visitor to host a return dinner at the chancery of his or her embassy in Washington. In general, during state visits the president and first lady will attend the return dinner. During official visits, only the Vice-President of the United States and their spouse will attend, though this custom is not one strictly observed and the president has attended return dinners during official visits, in addition to state visits.

=== Address to the Congress ===
The day following the state dinner, the visiting head of state or chief of government will often be invited to address a joint meeting of the Senate of the United States and the House of Representatives of the United States. As the parliamentary procedure for initiating a joint session is complex, a joint meeting is usually held instead. No foreign head of state or chief of government has ever addressed a joint session of Congress, although in 1934 French ambassador André Lefebvre de La Boulaye addressed a joint session to memorialize the centennial of the death of the Marquis de Lafayette.

=== Streetlining ===
Beginning the day before the arrival of the visitor, and continuing through their stay, lamp posts on Pennsylvania Avenue will be outfitted with the visiting state's flag, and that of the United States and the District of Columbia. The flag of the visiting state will also be displayed over the East Executive Avenue entrance to the Eisenhower Executive Building.

== Non-ceremonial activities ==
=== Visits to historic sites ===
On some state visits, foreign leaders have visited Mount Vernon, the Virginia home of George Washington. In 1944, General Charles de Gaulle, then the leader of the Free French Forces, traveled to the United States. The trip was treated by President Franklin D. Roosevelt as "something less than a state visit" but still featured "a schedule that had all the trappings of a visiting head of state"—including visits by de Gaulle to Mount Vernon and the Tomb of the Unknown Soldier at Arlington National Cemetery.

A trip to Mount Vernon was undertaken by Pakistan leader Ayub Khan in July 1961, when President John F. Kennedy hosted Khan at a state dinner at Mount Vernon. This was the first and apparently the only time in U.S. history that a state dinner has taken place outside the White House.

Many foreign heads of state over the years have also visited Monticello, the home of Thomas Jefferson, over the years, sometimes accompanied by the U.S. president and sometimes not. The first trip to Monticello by a visiting foreign head of state was made by Indonesian Prime Minister Sutan Sjahrir in September 1947.

In July 1985, Chinese President Li Xiannian traveled to the United States, the first such visit by a PRC representative. U.S. President Ronald Reagan bid a welcome to President Li at a ceremony on the South Lawn of the White House. In 1997, Chinese Communist Party general secretary Jiang Zemin began his state visit to the United States, the second by a paramount leader of China, after Deng Xiaoping, by visiting colonial Williamsburg and then Independence Hall in Philadelphia. In 1998, President Bill Clinton reciprocated when he began his state visit to China with a trip to the Mausoleum of the First Qin Emperor, famed as the site of the Terracotta Army.

=== River barge cruises ===
In 1992, Boris Yeltsin described his cruise on the Ceremonial Barge Chesapeake with George H. W. Bush:

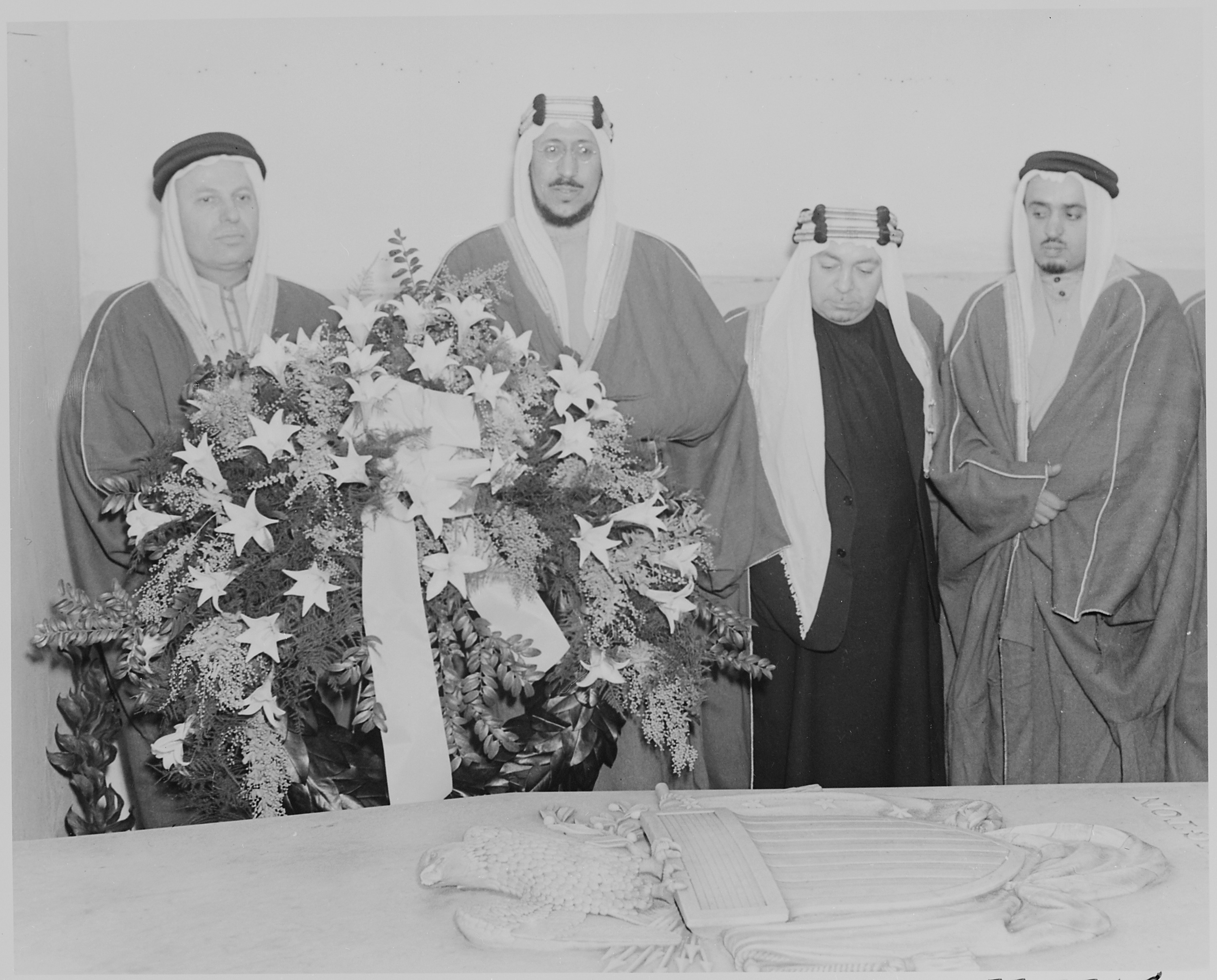
Saud of Saudi Arabia pays obeisance at the sarcophagus of George Washington during a visit in 1947.

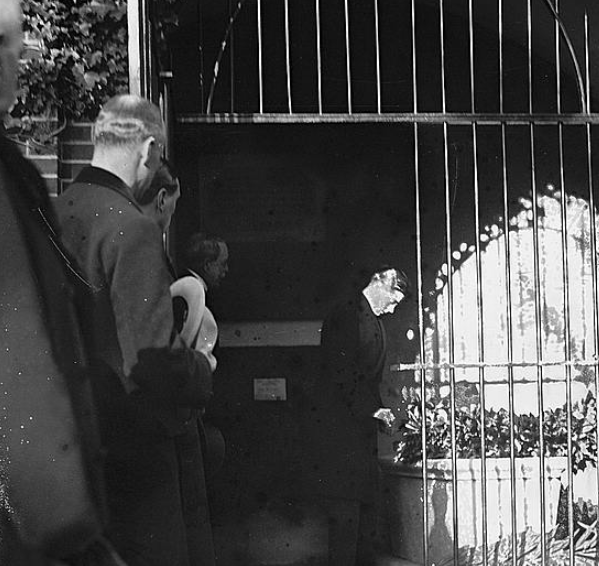
The Prince of Wales, later Edward VIII, pays obeisance at Washington's sarcophagus in 1919.

... there was a wonderful pleasure trip on a boat on the river which lasted an hour and 15 minutes. And even during that trip we worked, and we discussed a lot of issues that we will continue to talk about and will raise again at the next meeting. But I find that a lot of the benefit of a meeting of this nature is the kind of discussion that we had, not just on that boat where we talked for an hour about worldwide problems but the discussions that we had upstairs when I had some private time with the President, private time in the Oval Office with him, the Secretary, and Brent Scowcroft.

=== Tour ===
After four days in Washington, D.C., a visiting dignitary on a state or official visit may sometimes undertake a tour that lasts as long as ten days.

== In popular culture ==
- In the seventh episode of first season of the television series "The West Wing", President Josiah Bartlet hosts a state dinner for the President of Indonesia.
- In the third episode of the third season of the web television series House of Cards, President Frank Underwood hosts a state visit for the President of Russia.
- In the second episode of the fourth season of the HBO television series Veep, the character of Selina Meyer hosts an official visit for the prime minister of Israel.

== See also ==
- Commander-in-Chief's Guard (3rd Infantry Regiment)
- List of diplomatic visits to the United States
- List of diplomatic visits to the United States from Africa
- List of diplomatic visits to the United States from Asia
- List of diplomatic visits to the United States from Europe
- List of diplomatic visits to the United States from North America and the Caribbean
- List of diplomatic visits to the United States from South America
- List of diplomatic visits to the United States from Oceania
- List of United States military premier ensembles
- State funerals in the United States
- United States Army Herald Trumpets
