= DeWitt Hale =

American politician (1917–2018)

Member of the Texas House of Representatives
- In office January 13, 1953 – September 30, 1978
- In office January 10, 1939 – December 14, 1940

Personal details
- Born: Louis DeWitt Hale; June 10, 1917 Caddo Mills, Texas, U.S.
- Died: February 20, 2018 (aged 100) Austin, Texas
- Party: Democratic
- Spouse: Carol Moore (died 2008)
- Education: University of Texas
- Profession: lawyer

Louis DeWitt Hale (June 10, 1917 – February 20, 2018) was an American politician. He served as a Democratic member in the Texas House of Representatives from 1953 to 1978 and 1939 to 1940. He served as Speaker pro tempore from 1961 to 1962. Hale served in the United States Army Air Forces during World War II. From 1975 to 1978, he was Dean of the Texas House.
