= Kathleen Gemberling Adkison =

American painter

- Born: Kathleen Gemberling Parks; July 5, 1917; Beatrice, Nebraska, U.S.
- Died: August 3, 2010 (aged 93); Spokane, Washington, U S.
- Known for: Painting
- Movement: Abstract painting
- Spouse: Thomas Adkison (m. 1968–1986) (his death)
- Children: 2

Kathleen Gemberling Adkison (née Parks; July 5, 1917 – August 3, 2010) was an American abstract painter.

== Early life ==
Kathleen Gemberling Adkison was born in Beatrice, Nebraska, to parents Rupert Parks and Henrietta Williamson. She attended Hawthorn High School in Kearney, Nebraska for three years, and graduated from Garfield High School in Seattle, Washington. She studied art and painting under Leon Derbyshire at the Cornish Institute between 1938 and 1942.

== Career ==
"October" by Kathleen Gemberling Adkison, 1966

Adkison was the last surviving artist trained under Mark Tobey, who was Jackson Pollock's inspiration. Her work has been shown in museums as early as 1960 when the Frye Art Museum staged a solo show of her work. She also had a show at the Northwest Museum of Arts and Culture, formerly the Cheney Cowles Memorial Museum, in Spokane, Washington, from December 13, 1973 to January 13, 1974.

Adkison was a critically acclaimed artist and highly recognized for her work. She was among only eight women included in Northwest Art Today at the 1962 Seattle World's Fair. Adkison was the feature of a solo retrospective at the Cheney Cowles Museum in Spokane, Washington, from March 27, 1999, to June 27, 1999. It was the first retrospective of her work, at that museum, since 1974.

== Personal life ==
Adkison married Thomas Adkison, an architect, in 1968. They had two children. Adkison enjoyed hiking, and she climbed to the base camp at Mt. Everest twice. Thomas Adkison died in 1986. She died on August 3, 2010, in Spokane, Washington, aged 93.
