= Presidential Salute Battery =

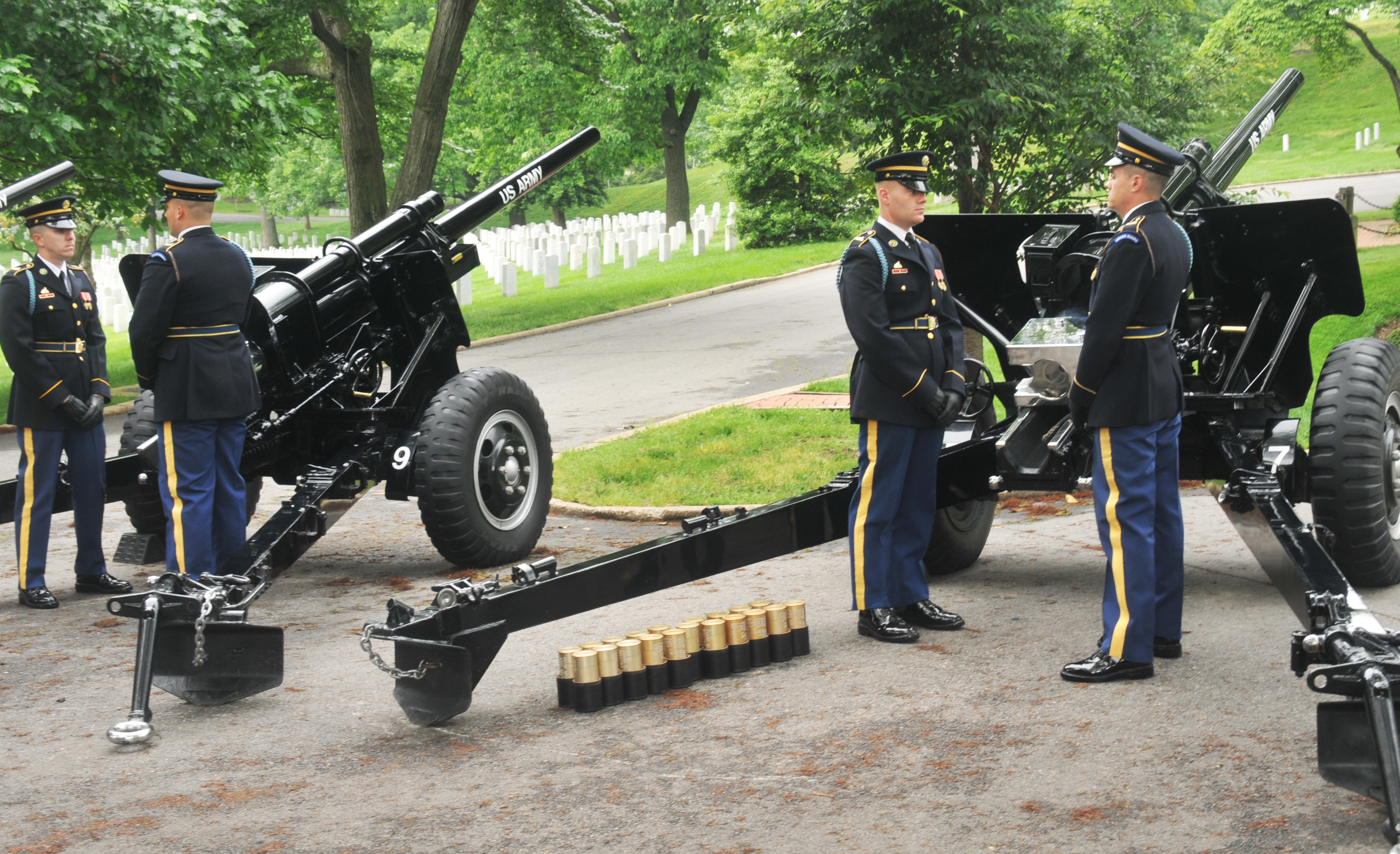
- Active: 1953 – Present
- Country: United States
- Branch: United States Army
- Type: Infantry
- Role: Memorial affairs, ceremonies and special events
- Size: Platoon
- Part of: 3rd U.S. Infantry Regiment (The Old Guard)
- Garrison/HQ: Joint Base Myer–Henderson Hall
- Equipment: 3-inch Gun M5; M252 81mm mortar
- Website: http://www.oldguard.mdw.army.mil/specialty-platoons/psb

The Presidential Salute Battery (Guns Platoon), an element of the 3rd United States Infantry Regiment, comprises soldiers qualified as MOS 11C (Mortarman). This battery primarily handles firing ceremonial gun-salute honors at general officer funerals, retirements, state occasions, and provides indirect fire support for the regiment's tactical operations.

== History ==
Activated in 1953, the Presidential Salute Battery is equipped with ten 3-inch Gun M5s. The M5 is a World War II-era anti-tank weapon and the cannons used by the battery trace their lineage back to the 614th Tank Destroyer Battalion.

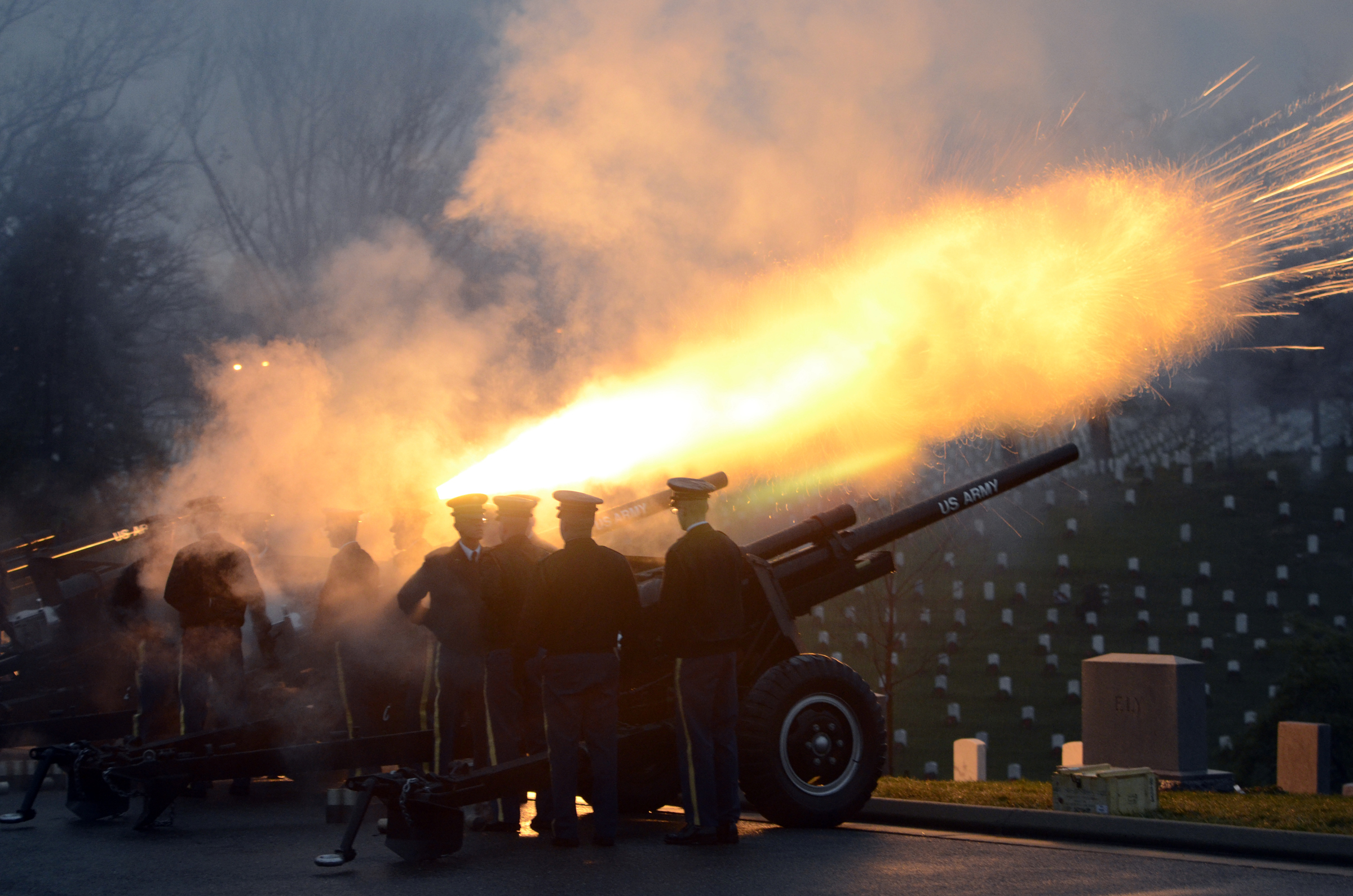
The Presidential Salute Battery pictured in 2013 during a ceremony at Arlington National Cemetery.

The battery renders gun salutes according to a customary order of arms, which is 21 rounds for heads of state (including the president of the United States and former presidents); 19 for the vice-president of the United States, foreign chiefs of government, and members of the cabinet of the United States; and 17, 15, 13, and 11 for flag officers of the rank of O-10, O-9, O-8, and O-7, respectively.

Under an 1890 regulation issued by the United States Department of War, the "Salute to the Union" consists of one round for every state of the United States, or 50 rounds since 1959; it is fired by the battery annually at noon on U.S. Independence Day. The Presidential Salute Battery fires blank artillery rounds packed with a 1 pound powder charge.

== Mission ==
=== Funerals ===
The battery is assigned to Arlington National Cemetery for full honor burials of sitting and former presidents of the United States, sitting cabinet secretaries, and military flag officers, as well as wreath-laying ceremonies at the Tomb of the Unknowns. For funerals at Arlington, it uses one of many firing positions, to include Sections 3, 4, and 28 of the cemetery on Miles, Dewey, and Mitchell Drives, respectively, or at Red Springs on McClellan Drive.

=== Public and military observances ===
The battery fires ceremonial gun salutes at events including the U.S. Army's weekly Twilight Tattoo, observances for Flag Day and Independence Day, and at the inauguration of a new president of the United States.

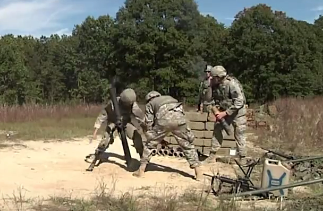
Presidential Salute Battery soldiers train on the M252 mortar in 2013, their primary equipment for non-ceremonial duties.

=== Military operations ===
As 1st Battalion’s mortar platoon and as the primary indirect fire support for the regiment, platoon members operate the 81mm M252 mortar system, per the 11C MOS job assignment.

=== State and official visits ===
During the White House arrival ceremony at state and official visits, the battery fires gun salutes from a firing position in President's Park during the performance of the visiting state's national anthem.

== See also ==
- 21-gun salute
