= George Drumm =

German-American musician (1874–1959)

- Born: 1874; Erdesbach, Germany
- Died: December 16, 1959; Dobbs Ferry, New York, United States

The fanfare and trio sections of George Drumm's "Hail, America", performed by the U.S. Marine Band in 2011.

George Drumm (1874 – December 16, 1959) was a German-American composer, musician, and conductor known for composing "Hail, America", reportedly a favorite march of Dwight Eisenhower, which has been regularly performed at official United States government ceremonies since the 1950s.

== Life and career ==
Born in Erdesbach, Germany, Drumm learned violin at an early age and, by 14, had become a noted solo virtuoso. In about 1898 he married his wife, Caroline, and later moved to Ireland, working at the Empire Theater in Dublin and taking the role of musical director at Dublin Castle. In 1904 he came to the United States as director of Ireland's Own Band, which had been booked to perform at the St. Louis World's Fair. Among the performers in that group was the noted Irish tenor John McCormack. At the end of the engagement, Drumm elected to remain in the United States. He settled in New York City where he worked as the bandmaster at a theater in the Bronx and guest conducted at several Broadway venues. Drumm was naturalized a U.S. citizen in 1911.

In 1917 Drumm composed "Hail, America" as part of an apparent effort to rebut questions as to his national loyalty following the 1917 United States declaration of war on Germany. According to Drumm, he wrote the march while riding the New York City Subway. Its first public performance was the following year during a park concert in New York City.

In 1935, Drumm was named the best bandmaster in the United States by the New York Evening Journal.

In later years Drumm lived in Irvington, New York. He died in 1959 in nearby Dobbs Ferry, New York, seven months after his wife, Caroline. He had two children. During his lifetime, Drumm held membership in the Royal Irish Academy of Music and in the American Society of Composers, Authors and Publishers (ASCAP).
