= Hail, America =

Regal concert march composed by George Drumm

- March by George Drumm
- Trio section performed by the U.S. Marine Band during a 2014 presidential entrance
- Related: Hail to the Chief; Hail, Columbia
- Composed: 1917
- Publisher: G. Schirmer, Inc.

Premiere
- Date: 1918
- Location: New York City

"Hail, America" is a regal concert march composed by George Drumm. It is known for its fanfare and trio sections performed during the presidential entrance at state dinners. It has also been used as the honors music for the President-elect of the United States.

== Background ==
"Hail, America" was composed by George Drumm, a German immigrant to the United States, in 1917 and first publicly performed during a concert in New York City the following year. Drumm appears to have composed the march to rebut questions as to his national loyalty after the United States declaration of war on Germany. According to Drumm, he wrote the march while riding the subway between Manhattan and Brooklyn.

Dwight Eisenhower preferred "Hail, America" to the traditional arrival march "Hail to the Chief" and ordered it performed at the 1953 and 1957 inaugurations to introduce him. Beginning with John F. Kennedy, the use of "Hail to the Chief" was resumed.

"Hail, America", performed during the platform entrance of Joe Biden during the 2021 United States presidential inauguration

The trio section of "Hail, America" was performed to introduce then President-elect Barack Obama during the 2009 presidential inauguration, eight years later, to introduce then President-elect Donald Trump at the 2017 presidential inauguration, four years later, to introduce then President-elect Joe Biden in the 2021 presidential inauguration, and four years later, to introduce then President-elect Donald Trump in the 2025 presidential inauguration.

== Presidential entrance ==
"Hail, America" is performed by United States Marine Band during a short transit ceremony by which the president of the United States moves from the second floor to the state floor of the White House on official occasions. In the ceremony, the president, the First Lady of the United States and, if applicable, a guest of honor and the guest of honor's spouse, descend the Grand Staircase accompanied by a military escort advancing the flag of the United States and the flag of the president of the United States.

The fanfare and trio sections of "Hail, America" performed by the U.S. Marine Band

The Grand Staircase was reconstructed in the imperial stair form by Theodore Roosevelt specifically to serve as a stage for the presidential entrance, whose early version had the president followed by a procession of 30 attendants and dignitaries. Cartoons at the time frequently portrayed Roosevelt descending the stairs crowned by a diadem. "Hail, America", however, did not become the musical accompaniment to the ceremony until the presidency of Eisenhower.

Early in the presidency of Jimmy Carter the presidential entrance was scrapped as part of an effort by Carter to make White House events less formal. During the 1977 state visit of Mexico, presidents Carter and José López Portillo descended the staircase without a military escort or the performance of "Hail, America". However, Misty Malarky Yin Yang, Amy Carter's cat, escaped from its room and unexpectedly joined presidents Carter and Portillo, according to one source "marching down the stairs most regally and surefooted" at the head of the group. (Another source, however, seems to dispute Misty Malarkey Yin Yang's composure, reporting instead that the cat actually appeared "very confused" while leading Carter and Portillo.) The performance of the presidential entrance ceremony was resurrected the following week, during the official visit of Canada. Prime Minister Pierre Trudeau, who had participated in the presidential entrance during previous visits to the United States, at the time remarked "I love coming in to that music" in reference to "Hail, America".

== See also ==
- American march music
- State visits to the United States
