= Zvi Keren =

Israeli pianist, musicologist and composer

Zvi Keren (Hebrew: צבי קרן; born Howard Ralph Kirshenbaum on August 18, 1917, died October 27, 2008) was a New York-born Israeli pianist, musicologist and composer. Upon his death was the last living pupil who was personally authorized by Joseph Schillinger. Considered to be among the pioneers of jazz playing in Israel, and the pioneer in an academic approach to jazz education in Israel, where he settled in 1951. Played an important role in the Israeli music scene as a composer, arranger and educator for generations of Israeli musicians.

== Biography ==
=== Early life ===
Keren was born Howard Ralph Kirshenbaum in 1917 in New York City, U.S.A. He was the only son of Charles Kirshenbaum (born 1889 in Poland. Came to U.S.A. 1909. Died in NYC, 1958) and Sara Samalman (born in 1891 in Poland. Came to U.S.A. 1909. Died in Israel, 1981). He spent his childhood in New York City as well as in his parents' holiday home at Atlantic Beach, New York. His mother was an amateur "classical" pianist, and therefore she was his first music teacher. Having graduated from high-school at the age of 16, he took up studies at New York University, where he received his BSc in chemistry in 1937.

=== Education and performance career ===
Zvi Keren started to learn piano at the age of 7. In high-school he started to play popular songs. A record of Fats Waller and his rhythm attracted him to jazz, and he decided to make music his profession. He resumed serious piano study (1935–36) with Nadia Reisenberg (Teddy Wilson's teacher) and Paolo Gallico, and studied composition and theory (1939–43) with Joseph Schillinger, who authorized him personally to teach his system. Among his favorite pianists: Billy Kyle, AI Haig, André Previn and Bob James. During the 1940s Keren was professionally known as Howard Kirn. He conducted much musical activity throughout the US, and served as a pianist and arranger with the bands of Reggie Childs and Ray Kinney; as an accompanist and coach of singers in both jazz and popular music; as an arranger for bands, night-club acts and singers; as a teacher of arranging and composition in schools and privately; as a teacher of piano technique; as a pianist in New York night-clubs and hotels; as a pianist for the television station WPIX, New York City; as a conductor-pianist for U.S.O. (United Service Organizations) during World War II - on which occasion Keren extensively toured continental US and Alaska playing with bands accompanying well-known singers. In 1946 Keren received his M.A. in composition from Columbia University. In those years he also studied musicology with Curt Sachs, Paul Henry Lang and Gustave Reese.

=== Educational, musicological and arranging career in Israel ===
When Keren drew closer to the traditional Jewish customs, he decided to end his professional activity in the US. In 1951 he immigrated to Israel, settled in Haifa, Pardes Hana and finally Tel-Aviv. There he took over educational jobs at local high-schools (Thelma Yelin high-school; the "Oranim" seminar for teachers) and served as musical director of Lod youth music center (1956–58). In 1958, he moved to London, to study at London University. During his years in England, Keren became a lecturer of the Jewish Agency in England (1958–61), and the Hebrew branch of the BBC (1959). He received his Ph.D., titled “The Sources and Stylistic Development of Israeli Art Music Since 1930”, in 1961 (his advisor being Dr. Wilfrid Dunwell), and subsequently returned to Israel. Throughout the 1960s and 1970s Keren made multiple appearances as pianist, composer and arranger on radio and television, and was featured in numerous performances as a pianist in nightclubs. Between the years 1961-70 Keren worked as an arranger and composer for the Israeli radio broadcasting station ("Kol Yisrael", a part of the Israel Broadcasting Authority, IBA). Especially notable was his work with the light music orchestra of IBA (known as "Tizmoret HaBidur" and working during the years 1962-64), during which Keren wrote the first jazz big-band arrangements to be performed in Israel. He was chairman of Israeli Arrangers Union for 8 consecutive years (1962–70) and was a most sought after private teacher of professional pianists, musicians and arrangers for over 30 years. In addition, Keren was a member of the publishing committee of the Israeli Composers Union (ICU; 1961–69); a lecturer at the cantorship school headed by Leib Glantz (1965–66); a lecturer in front of music teachers as part of a project organized by the Histadrut (1966–68); one of the leaders of the "Musical Youth" organization (1962); a member of the judging committee for the ACUM composition prizes (1966) and the Liberson competition (1969); a founding member of the Israeli Musicologists Organization. In 1970, Keren was one of the founding members of the Musicology Department in Bar-Ilan University. He served as a professor in this department until retiring at 1986. During this period he completed a book on the subject of contemporary Israeli music. Among his interests of research were the mentioning of music in the commentary of the bible, the Mishna and the Talmud, and contemporary Israeli music. During the 1960s (1964–65) and 1970s (1973–74), Keren also taught jazz composition at the music academy of Tel-Aviv University. As well as a musicologist and educator, Keren was also an active composer for over half a century. Many of his Jazz compositions were recorded by the light-music orchestra of the Israeli radio broadcasting station and other ensembles. His composition "Rabbi Isaac Said", inspired by traditional texts from Genesis, for mixed chorus, vibraphone, piano, cello and percussion appeared on an LP record on the occasion of the 10th anniversary of the Department of Musicology at Bar-Ilan University.

== Legacy ==
As an arranger and teacher, he figures prominently in the spread of jazz appreciation and in the establishment of jazz education in Israel. He was the first in Israel to give jazz courses ("Introduction to Jazz" and "Jazz Composition") at an Israeli university. He was the first composer in Israel to compose original jazz pieces for orchestra which were broadcast and performed in Israel as well as in Europe ("Electronic Brain," "Riot in Russia," "Regards to Igor" and others). A review of Keren's eighty-year career and many contributions to the Israeli jazz scene can be found in an interview and article written by his daughter Alona Sagee for Min-Ad: Israel Studies in Musicology Online.

== Personal life ==
In 1954, Keren married Rina Koplowitz. The couple had 3 daughters: Shoshanna, born in Israel, 1957; Ziviah, born in England, 1959; and Alona, born in Israel, 1962. Shoshanna has 4 children, and Alona has 2 children, all born in Israel. His daughter Alona carried on the musical tradition of the family and is a professional musician (pianist) and musicologist. She holds a Ph.D. specializing in jazz, and has been teaching at the Music Department of Bar-Ian University since 1990. After retiring from Bar-Ilan University in 1986, Zvi Keren divided his activities between Jewish studies and music. He died in 2008.
