= Alex Urban =

American football player (1917–2007)

No. 23, 18, 79
- Positions: Defensive end, tight end

Personal information
- Born: July 16, 1917; Bessemer, Pennsylvania, U.S.
- Died: September 7, 2007 (aged 90); Toledo, Ohio, U.S.
- Listed height: 6 ft 3 in (1.91 m)
- Listed weight: 207 lb (94 kg)

Career information
- High school: Toledo (OH) Waite
- College: South Carolina

Career history
- Green Bay Packers (1941, 1944–1945)

Awards and highlights
- NFL champion (1944)

Career statistics
- Receptions: 4
- Receiving yards: 91
- Touchdowns: 1
- Stats at Pro Football Reference

Alexander William Urban (July 16, 1917 – September 7, 2007) was an American football defensive end and a tight end in the National Football League (NFL) who played for the Green Bay Packers. Urban played collegiately at the University of South Carolina, and entered the NFL with the Green Bay Packers. Urban played professionally in 1941, and after fighting in World War II, played 2 more seasons with the Packers before retiring.
