= American Regiment =

American Regiment may refer to:

- King's Royal Rifle Corps, British regiment known as the "American Regiment" when originally formed in North America
- 3rd Infantry Regiment (United States), US Army regiment first organized as the 1st American Regiment
