= Joint Base Myer–Henderson Hall =

Joint base of US military near Arlington, Virginia

- Arlington, Virginia in the United States
- Soldiers with the 3rd US Infantry Regiment (The Old Guard) perform during the Twilight Tattoo at JB Myer–Henderson Hall.

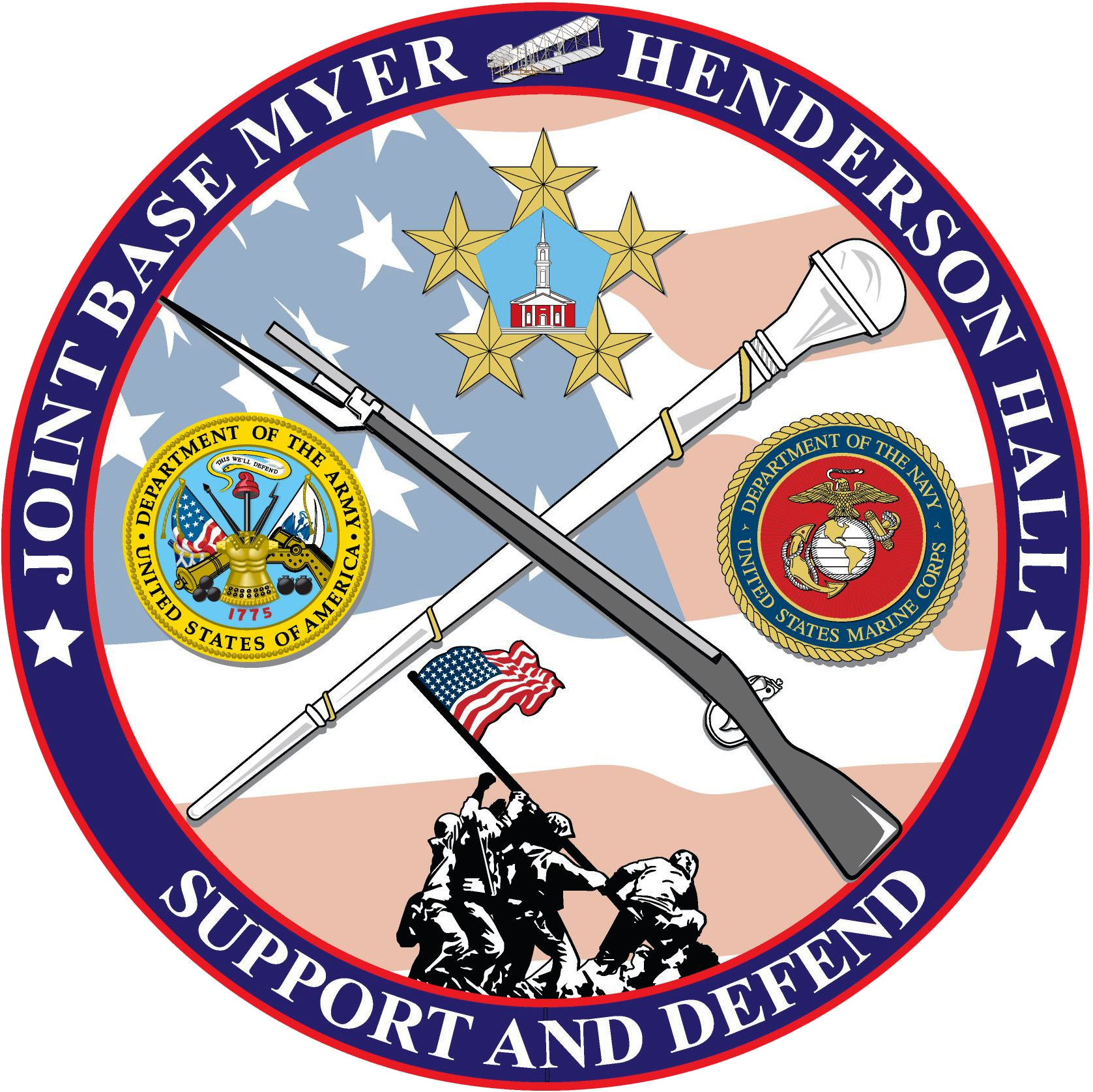
- Motto Support and Defend

Site information
- Type: US military Joint Base
- Owner: Department of Defense
- Operator: US Army
- Controlled by: US Army Installation Management Command (IMCOM)
- Condition: Operational
- Website: home.army.mil/jbmhh/

Location
- Location within the United States
- Coordinates: 38.880343°N 77.079735°W

Site history
- Built: 1863 (as Fort Cass); 1791 (Fort McNair); 1941 (Henderson Hall)

Garrison information
- Current commander: Colonel Keith P. Sandoval
- Occupants: 3rd US Infantry Regiment; United States Army Band; U.S. Coast Guard Ceremonial Honor Guard

Joint Base Myer–Henderson Hall is a joint base of the United States Armed Forces, located across multiple sites in the National Capital Region. It is jointly made up of Fort Myer (in Arlington), Fort McNair (in Washington, D.C.), and Henderson Hall (in Arlington). It is the local residue of the Base Realignment and Closure, 2005 process. It is commanded by the United States Army but has resident commands of Army, Navy, and Marines. Most conspicuous is the Arlington National Cemetery Honor Guard.

The two eponymous bases are co-located along the west boundary of the cemetery, and Fort McNair is across the Potomac River, in Washington, D.C., on the Anacostia River.

On Fort McNair sits Grant Hall which is the location of the 1865 military tribunal of the conspirators of the assassination of Abraham Lincoln. Each quarter the Hall is open to the public where people can visit the courtroom and learn more about the trials.

== Operations ==
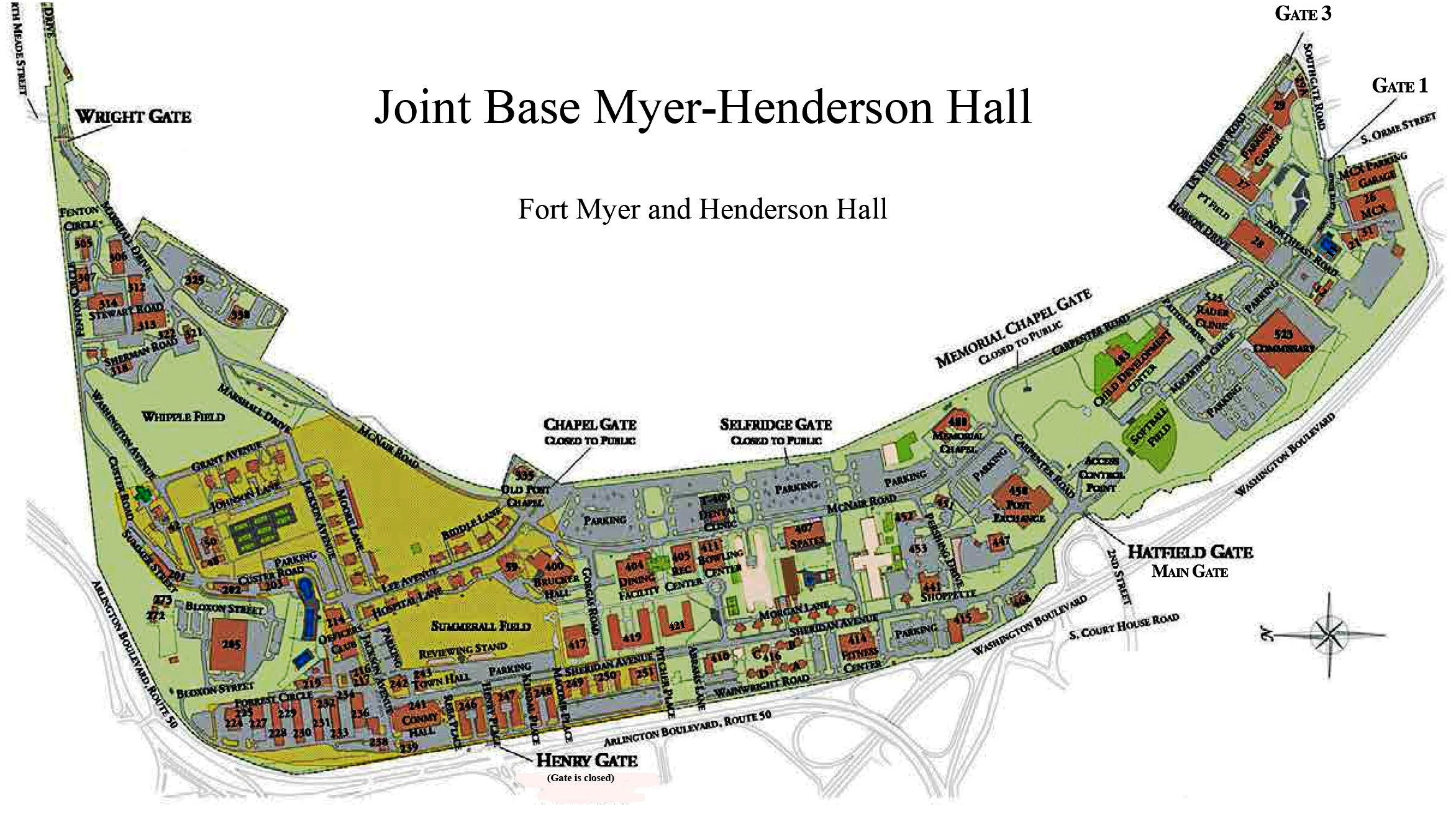
Map of Joint Base Myer–Henderson Hall.

Fort Myer is headquarters to service personnel working throughout the National Capital Region. The post provides housing, support, and services to thousands of active-duty, reserve, and retired military, members of the U.S. Coast Guard, and their families stationed in the United States Army Military District of Washington. The JBMHH's mission is to operate the Army's community and support Homeland Security in the nation's capital.

Stationed here are The First and Fourth battalions of the 3rd U.S. Infantry Regiment (The Old Guard); since August 2011, 'A' Company (Commander in Chief's Guard), which was stationed at Fort McNair, D.C; and The U.S. Army Band "Pershing's Own". The gravesite of Black Jack, the riderless horse in the state funerals of General of the Army Douglas MacArthur and U.S. Presidents John F. Kennedy, Herbert Hoover, Dwight D. Eisenhower, and Lyndon B. Johnson, is located on Summerall Field, 200 feet (61 m) northeast of the parade ground's flagpole.

Due to its proximity to Arlington National Cemetery, this is also the base of operations for most Honor Guards services and burial teams. A large percentage of burials in Arlington National Cemetery originate from Old Post Chapel, one of the two chapels on Fort Myer. Visitors are also given access to the caissons, stables and the Old Guard Museum.

The military's largest child development center, named the Cody Child Development Center (CDC), is located here.

The Pentagram is written and produced here. It is a weekly newspaper that is delivered to the joint base and the Pentagon.
