= James Fegan =

American soldier

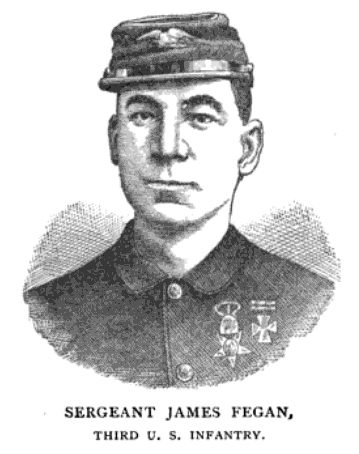
- Sergeant James Fegan illustration made in 1886
- Born: 1827; Athlone, Ireland
- Died: June 25, 1886 (aged 59); Fort Shaw, Montana Territory, United States
- Burial place: Custer National Cemetery
- Military career
- Allegiance: United States of America
- Branch: United States Army
- Service years: 1851–1885
- Rank: Sergeant
- Units: 2nd U.S. Infantry; 3rd U.S. Infantry
- Conflicts: American Civil War; Indian Wars
- Awards: Medal of Honor

Sergeant James Fegan (1827 – June 25, 1886) was an American soldier in the U.S. Army who served with the 2nd and 3rd U.S. Infantry during the American Civil War, and Indian Wars. In March 1868, while escorting a powder train en route from Fort Harker to Fort Dodge, Kansas, he single-handedly prevented a mob from blowing up the train to free an army deserter. For his efforts, he received the Medal of Honor.

Fegan was popular and well known in the military during his lifetime. He was especially noted for his shrewdness and humor, having many colorful stories and anecdotes attributed to him. President Chester A. Arthur spoke of him in a special message to the United States Congress in 1882. His life and career were among several prominent officers profiled by author Theo F. Rodenbough in his books Uncle Sam's Medal of Honor (1886) and Sabre and Bayonet: Stories of Heroism and Military Adventure (1897).

== Biography ==
=== Early life and military career ===
Born in Athlone, Ireland in 1827, James Fegan served some time with the Irish Constabulary prior to emigrating to the United States in 1850. After arriving in New York City, New York, he enlisted as a private in the U.S. Army and assigned to Company I of the 2nd U.S. Infantry on October 29, 1851. By the end of his first enlistment in 1856, he had risen to the rank of sergeant. Fegan remained with his unit up to and during the American Civil War. As part of the Army of the Potomac, he saw action at Gaines' Mill, Malvern Hill, Hanover Court House, Fair Oaks, Harrison's Landing, Bull Run, Centreville, South Mountain and Antietam. Though seriously wounded at Antietam, having taken a bullet in the right leg, he reenlisted in Company C of the 3rd U.S. Infantry on March 31, 1864. He held a distinguished war record, having been wounded several times in action, and participated in a number of major battles during the final years of the war. Among these included the battles of Petersburg, Reams' Station, James' Station, Birney Station, Stoneman's Creek, the first and second battles of Deep Bottom, South Side Railroad, Danville Railroad, Boydton Plank Road, Appomattox Station, Farmsville City, New House, Savage's Station, Reno Station, Manchester, Richmond, Dunwiddie, Burksville Junction, Appomattox Courthouse and the subsequent surrender of General Lee's Army.

=== Incident at Plum Creek ===
Fegan remained with the Regular Army after the war and saw considerable service on the frontier. In March 1868, he was assigned to escort a mule train carrying gunpowder from Fort Harker to Fort Dodge, Kansas. It was during the trip that Fegan caught an army deserter with the intention of turning him in upon his arrival in Fort Dodge. Camping one night near Plum Creek, however, Fegan was confronted by a fellow soldier, Sergeant John W. Blake of the 7th U.S. Cavalry, who had organized a posse from local townspeople and demanded that the deserter be released. Refusing to turn over his prisoner, the mob attempted to set the gunpowder on fire and take the deserter by force. Fegan ran off the mob single-handed, wounding two of his attackers, and continued to Fort Dodge where he safely arrived on March 13. He was recommended by the fort commander for the Medal of Honor which he received on October 19, 1868.

=== Later years ===
Fegan continued to serve with the 3rd U.S. Infantry during the last years of his life. Though placed in the Soldiers' Home in Washington, D.C. shortly after his sixth reenlistment in 1870, he was granted discharged from the home and returned to duty in the Montana Territory.

Fegan was a well-known character in the regiment, known for his shrewdness and humor, and many memorable anecdotes were attributed to him during his lifetime. On December 6, 1882, Fegan was the subject of a special presidential message by Chester A. Arthur to the United States Congress. His life and career was profiled by author Theo F. Rodenbough in his books Uncle Sam's Medal of Honor (1886) and Sabre and Bayonet: Stories of Heroism and Military Adventure (1897). His son, John Fegan Jr., had joined the 3rd Infantry and eventually became a sergeant alongside his father in Company H. He retired from active service at Fort Missoula in the Montana Territory on May 8, 1885. A year later, Fegan died at Fort Shaw on June 25, 1886, at the age of 59. He was interred at Custer National Cemetery near the Crow Agency in Montana.

=== Personal life ===
Fegan was married twice. His first wife, the mother of James Fegan Jr., died in Fort Dodge, Kansas in 1867. He then married a servant of Rose Adele Cutts Williams (1835–1899), the wife of Robert Williams, Adjutant General of the U.S. Army.

== Medal of Honor citation ==
Rank and organization: Sergeant, Company H, 3d U.S. Infantry. Place and date: At Plum Creek, Kans., March 1868. Entered service at: ------. Birth: Ireland. Date of issue: October 19, 1878.

Citation:

While in charge of a powder train en route from Fort Harker to Fort Dodge, Kans., was attacked by a party of desperadoes, who attempted to rescue a deserter in his charge and to fire the train. Sgt. Fegan, single-handed, repelled the attacking party, wounding 2 of them, and brought his train through in safety.

== See also ==
- List of Medal of Honor recipients for the Indian Wars
