= United States Army Drill Team =

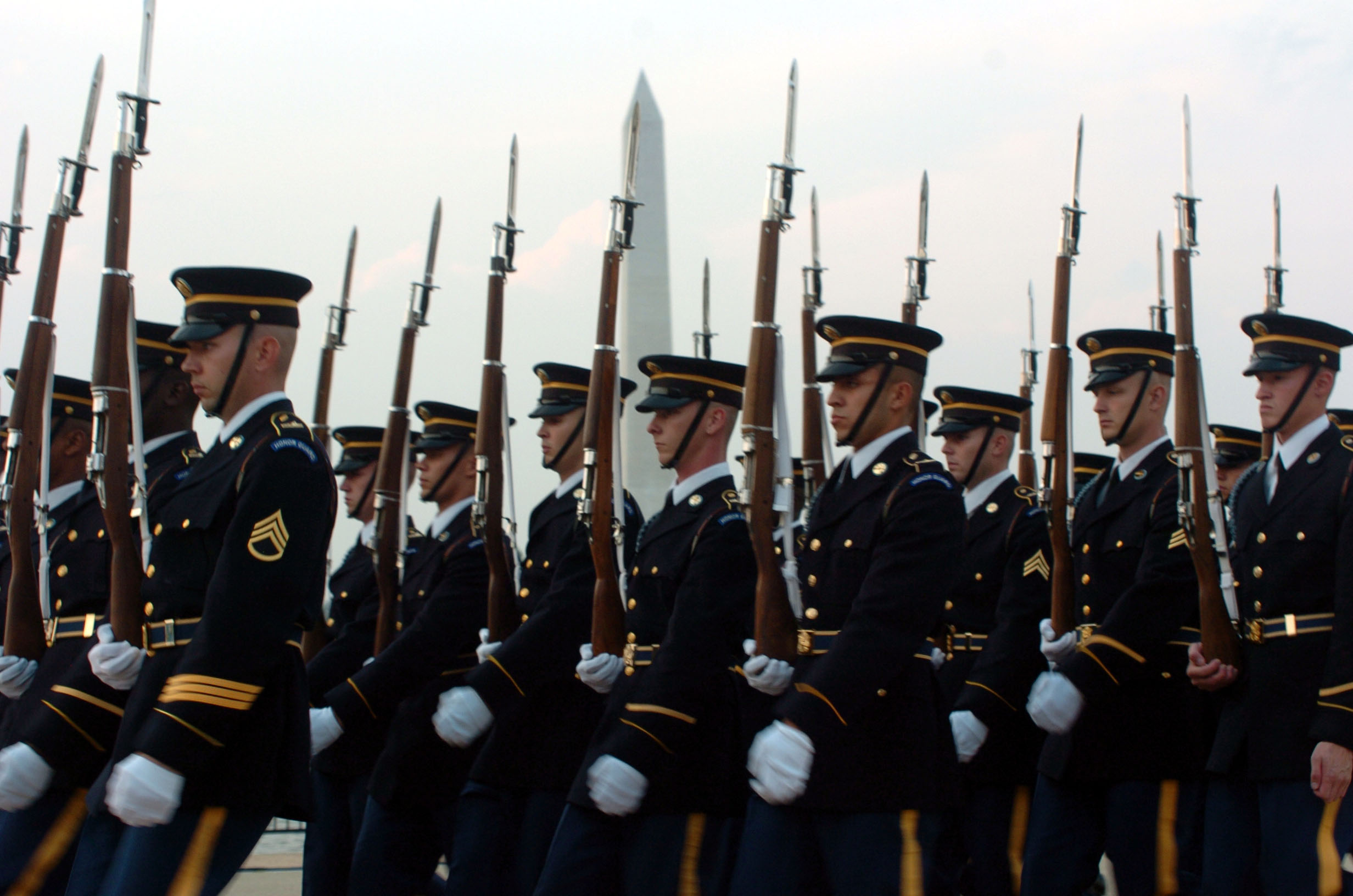
The United States Army Drill Team marching on the Jefferson Memorial Plaza for Twilight Tattoo.

The United States Army Drill Team is a 19-member precision drill platoon which represents the United States Army at official occasions. (Note: The platoon's official purpose does not include rendering honors, that is provided by the Echo Company of the 4th Battalion, 3rd Infantry Regiment.) It is officially part of the Headquarters Company, 4th Battalion, 3rd U.S. Infantry Regiment (The Old Guard). Members of the platoon can come from any Military Occupational Specialty (MOS). The platoon use a M1903 Springfield.

== Performances ==
Regiment officials have said that on any given year, the team participates in over 100 ceremonies, including professional and collegiate sporting events, JROTC or ROTC events, parades and community outreach events. The platoon performs annually at the Twilight Tattoo held in late May and early June, as well as the Spirit of America festival in September. The U.S. Army Drill Team was created to concentrate on precise marching and crisp rifle drill. They have supported The Old Guard's ceremonial missions, and public duties for over 50 years.

== Training ==
Soldiers are selected for this unit after 6 months of drill practice. Trim military bearing, strength, and dexterity are mandatory requirements for qualification in the platoon. A typical training day begins at 5 a.m. and runs to 11:30 a.m., when the team takes a break for lunch. Training then continues from 1 to 5 p.m.. Potential candidates for the drill team are required to memorize the first 6 to 7 minutes of the regular drill (which amounts to 12 to 14 minutes).

== Gallery ==
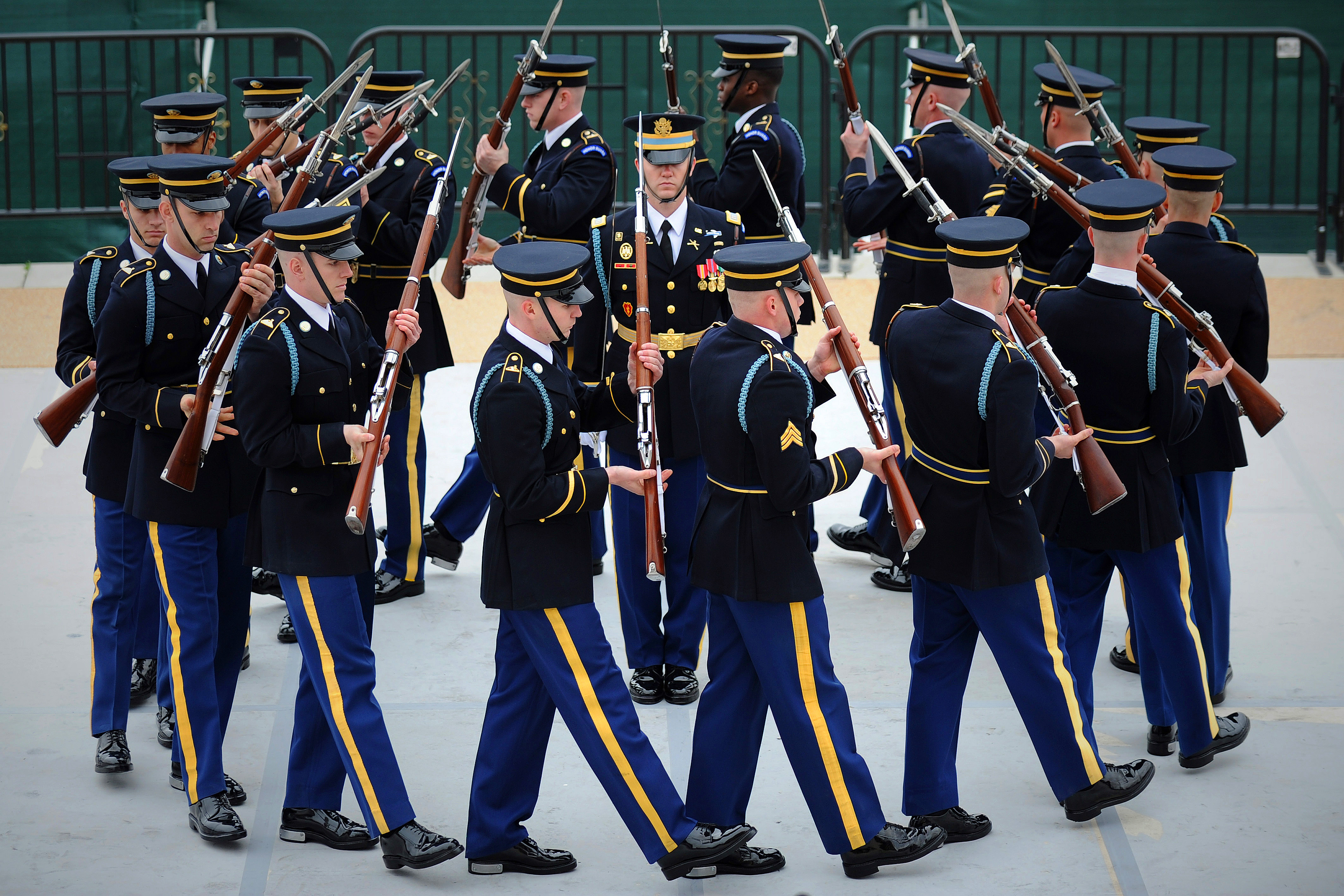
The team performing in a Joint Service Drill Exhibition during the National Cherry Blossom Festival at the Jefferson Memorial.

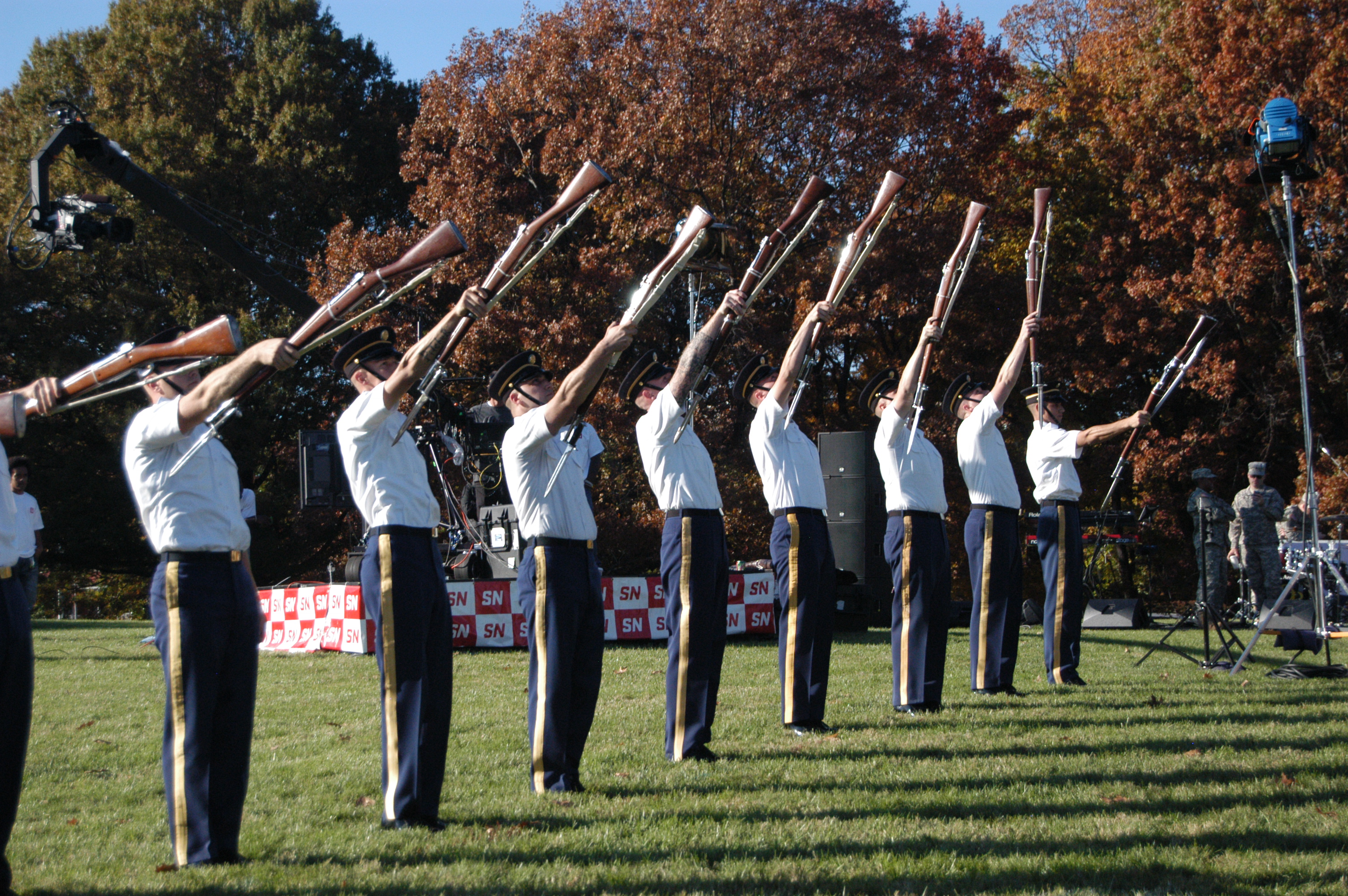
Members of the team practicing prior to a live performance.

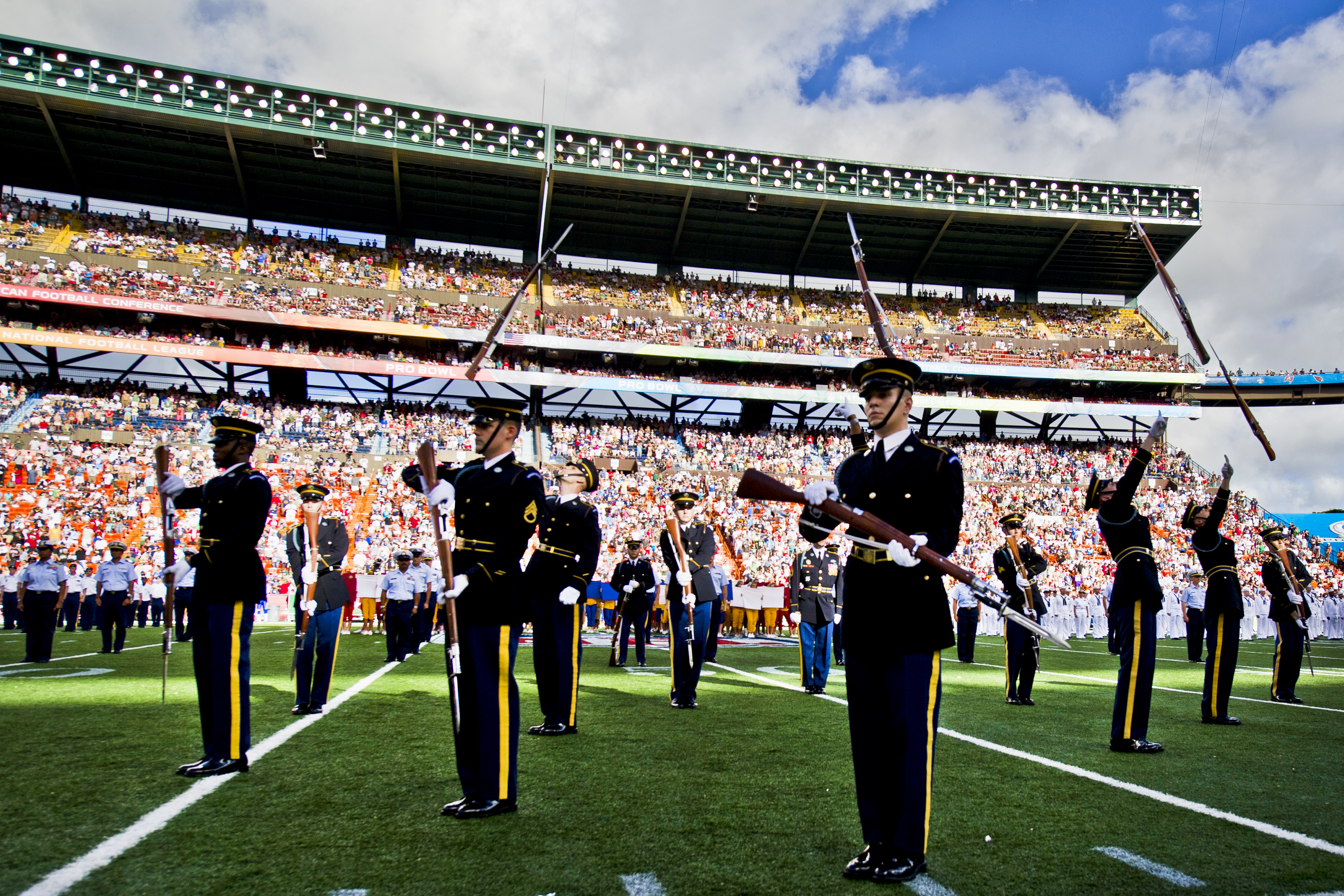
Soldiers of the U.S. Army Drill Team performing at Aloha Stadium during the 2012 NFL Pro Bowl halftime show in Honolulu.

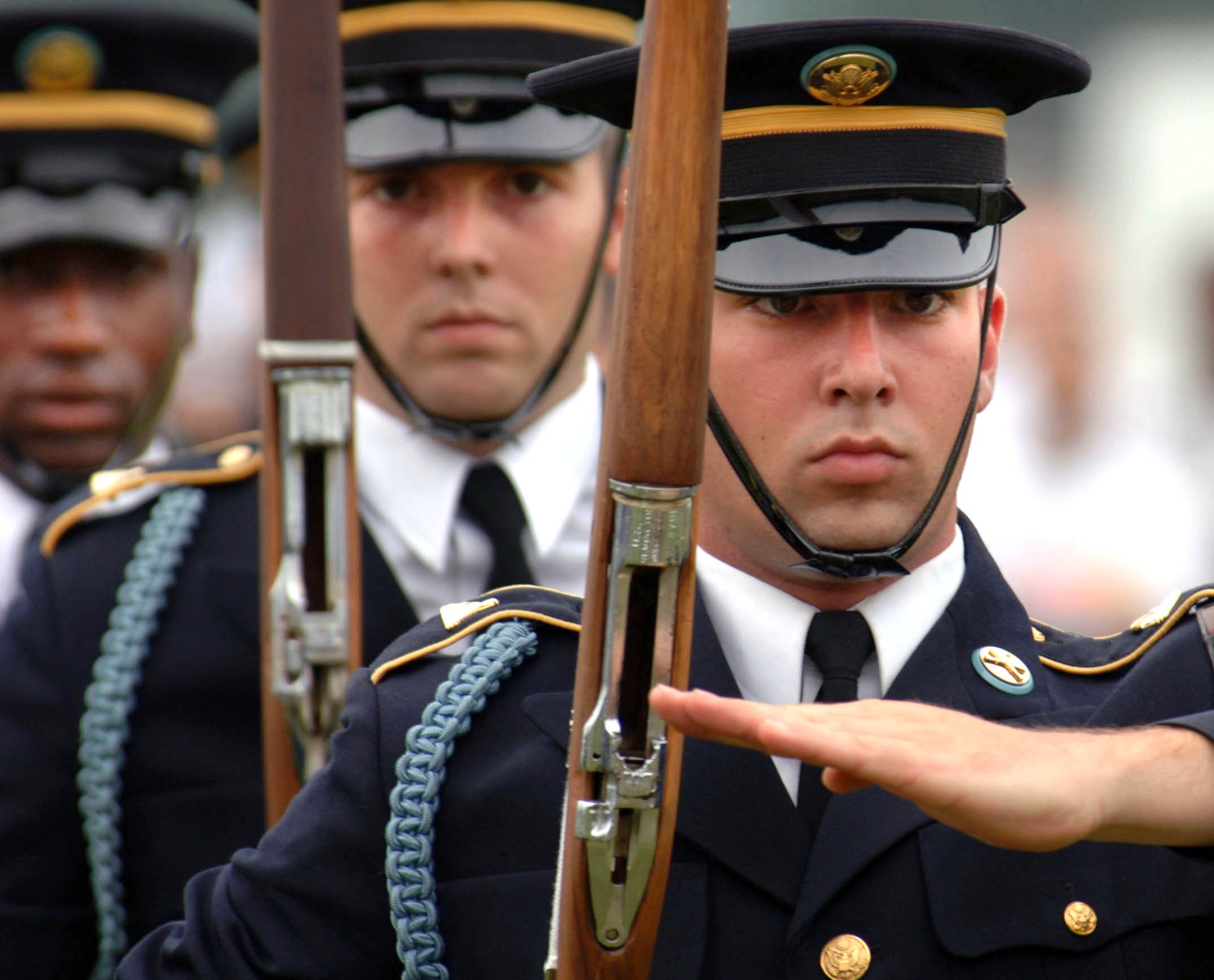
A U.S. Army Drill Team member executing precision drill movements during a festival in Fort Eustis, Virginia.

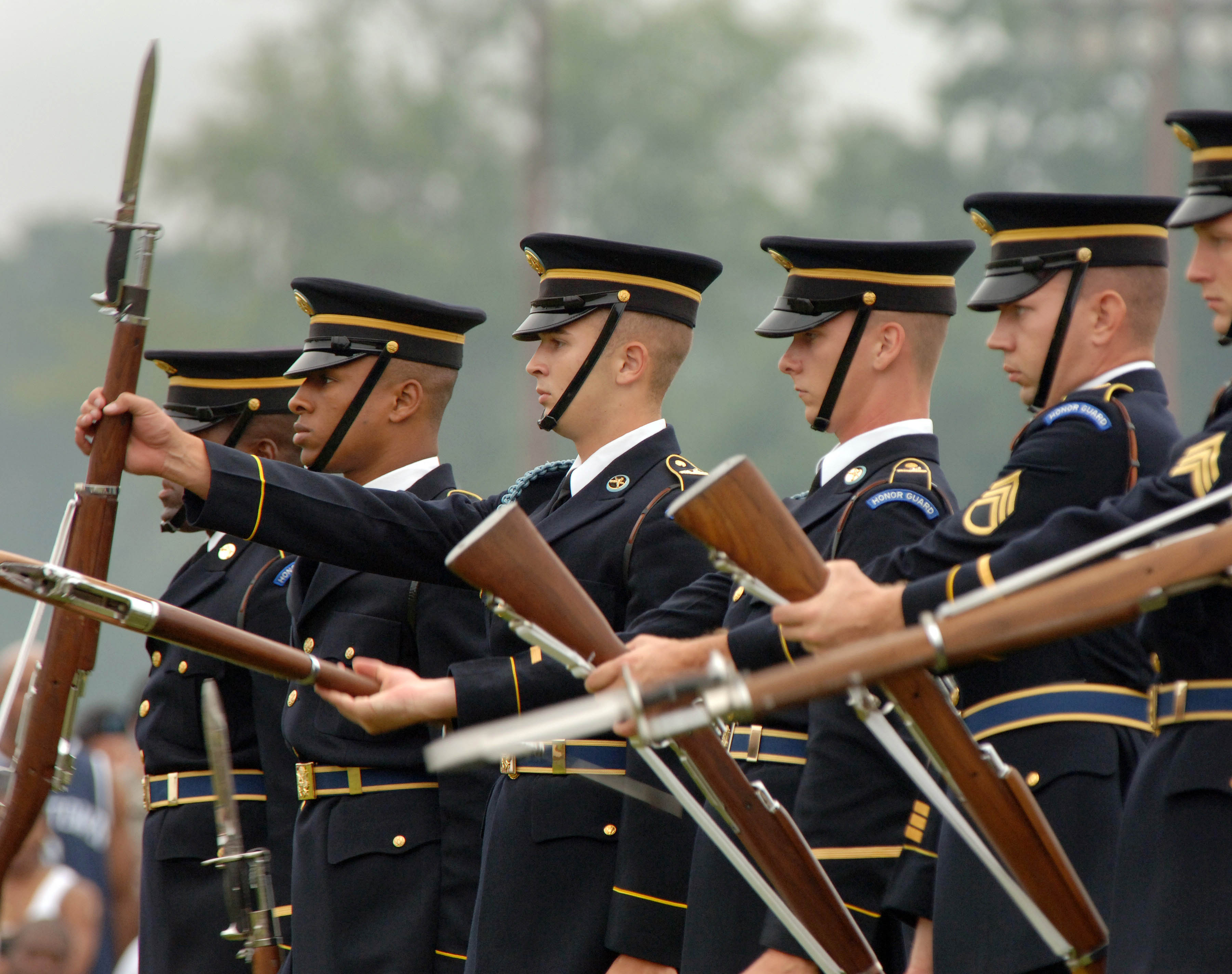

A soldier with the U.S. Army Drill Team performs in January 2014 at the Alamodome in San Antonio.

== Related Articles ==
- Joint Base Anacostia–Bolling
- United States Army Band
- United States Marine Corps Silent Drill Platoon
- 3rd U.S. Infantry Regiment (The Old Guard)
- United States Air Force Honor Guard
- United States Coast Guard Ceremonial Honor Guard
- United States Navy Ceremonial Guard
