= Michael Fleming Folland =

- Army Medal of Honor
- Born: April 15, 1949; Richmond, Virginia, U.S.
- Died: July 3, 1969 (aged 20); Long Khánh Province, Republic of Vietnam
- Burial place: Glendale National Cemetery, Richmond, Virginia
- Military career
- Allegiance: United States
- Branch: United States Army
- Service years: 1968–1969
- Rank: Corporal
- Units: Company D, 2d Battalion, 3rd Infantry Regiment, 199th Infantry Brigade.
- Conflicts: Vietnam War †
- Awards: Medal of Honor; Purple Heart

Michael Fleming Folland (April 15, 1949 – July 3, 1969) was a United States Army soldier and a recipient of the United States military's highest decoration—the Medal of Honor—for his actions in the Vietnam War.

== Biography ==
Folland was born in Richmond, Virginia, April 15, 1949. He joined the Army in 1968, and by July 3, 1969, was serving as a corporal in Company D, 2d Battalion, 3rd Infantry Regiment, 199th Infantry Brigade. During a firefight on that day, in Long Khanh Province, South Vietnam, during Operation Toan Thang III, Folland smothered the blast of an enemy-thrown hand grenade with his body, sacrificing his life to protect those around him.

== Medal of Honor citation ==
Corporal Folland's Medal of Honor citation reads:

For conspicuous gallantry and intrepidity in action at the risk of his life above and beyond the call of duty. Cpl. Folland distinguished himself while serving as an ammunition bearer with the weapons platoon of Company D, during a reconnaissance patrol mission. As the patrol was moving through a dense jungle area, it was caught in an intense crossfire from heavily fortified and concealed enemy ambush positions. As the patrol reacted to neutralize the ambush, it became evident that the heavy weapons could not be used in the cramped fighting area. Cpl. Folland dropped his recoilless rifle ammunition, and ran forward to join his commander in an assault on the enemy bunkers. The assaulting force moved forward until it was pinned down directly in front of the heavily fortified bunkers by machine gun fire. Cpl. Folland stood up to draw enemy fire on himself and to place suppressive fire on the enemy positions while his commander attempted to destroy the machine gun positions with grenades. Before the officer could throw a grenade, an enemy grenade landed in the position. Cpl. Folland alerted his comrades and his commander hurled the grenade from the position. When a second enemy grenade landed in the position, Cpl. Folland again shouted a warning to his fellow soldiers. Seeing that no one could reach the grenade and realizing that it was about to explode, Cpl. Folland, with complete disregard for his safety, threw himself on the grenade. By his dauntless courage, Cpl. Folland saved the lives of his comrades although he was mortally wounded by the explosion. Cpl. Folland's extraordinary heroism, at the cost of his life, was in keeping with the highest traditions of the military service and reflects great credit upon himself, his unit, and the U.S. Army.

== See also ==
- List of Medal of Honor recipients for the Vietnam War
