= Glendale National Cemetery =

Historic veterans cemetery in Henrico County, Virginia

- U.S. National Register of Historic Places
- Virginia Landmarks Register
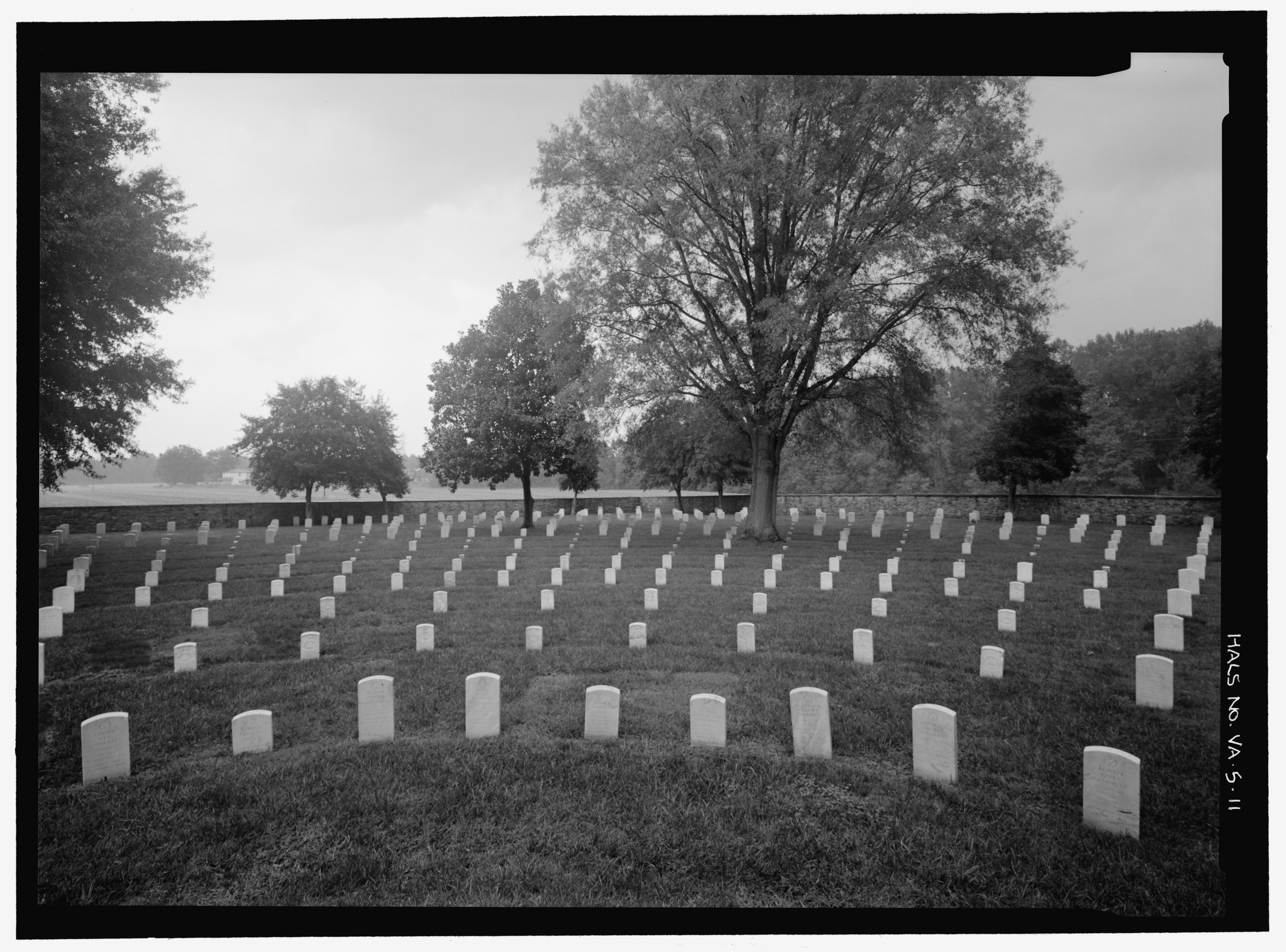

- Location within Virginia Location within the United States
- Nearest city: Richmond, Virginia
- Coordinates: 37°26′10″N 77°14′04″W
- Area: 6.6 acres (2.7 ha)
- Built: 1866
- Architect: Meigs, Montgomery C.
- Architectural style: Second Empire
- MPS: Civil War Era National Cemeteries MPS
- NRHP reference No.: 96000026
- VLR No.: 043-0753

Significant dates
- Added to NRHP: February 26, 1996
- Designated VLR: October 18, 1995

Glendale National Cemetery is a United States National Cemetery located near the city of Richmond, in Henrico County, Virginia. Administered by the United States Department of Veterans Affairs, it encompasses 2.1 acres (0.85 ha), and as of the end of 2005 had 2,064 interments. It is closed to new interments.

== History ==
Glendale National Cemetery was established on May 7, 1866, and named after a farmstead that was on the property at the time. The original interments were the remains of Union soldiers who died at the Battle of Malvern Hill and other nearby American Civil War battlefields.

Glendale National Cemetery was listed on the National Register of Historic Places in 1996.

== Notable interments ==
- Corporal Michael Fleming Folland (1949–1969), Medal of Honor recipient for action in the Vietnam War.
