= Oscar Burkard =

German-American soldier

Oscar R. Burkard
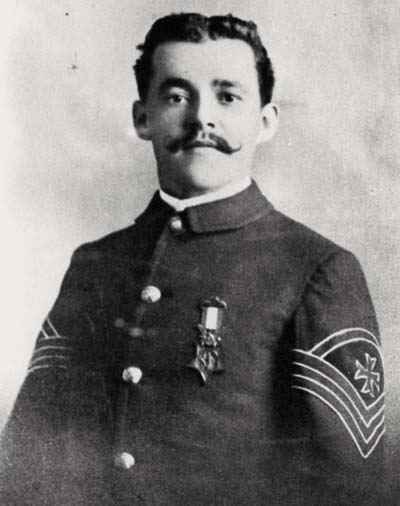
- Oscar Burkard wearing the Medal of Honor.
- Born: December 21, 1877; Achern, Baden-Württemberg, Germany
- Died: February 18, 1950 (aged 72); Rome, New York, United States
- Military career
- Allegiance: United States of America
- Branch: United States Army
- Service years: 1898–1930
- Rank: Major
- Unit: 3rd U.S. Infantry
- Conflicts: Indian Wars; World War I
- Awards: Medal of Honor

Oscar Rudolph Burkard (December 21, 1877 – February 18, 1950) was a German-American soldier who served in the U.S. Army during the Indian Wars and World War I. In 1899, he received the Medal of Honor for his actions during the Battle of Sugar Point. Aside from being the only non-combatant to be decorated from that engagement, Burkard was also the last man to receive the medal during the Indian Wars.

== Biography ==
Born in Achern, Germany, he immigrated to the United States in 1895 and joined the US Army at Fort Snelling in April 1898. Assigned to the 3rd U.S. Infantry, he served as a private in the Hospital Corps and was present as an acting hospital steward at the Battle of Sugar Point on October 5, 1898. During the battle, he rescued several soldiers while under heavy fire from the Pillagers and continued to do so throughout the day. He was later awarded the Medal of Honor "for distinguished bravery in action against hostile Indians" and officially received the award on August 21, 1899.

Seeing service during World War I, he retired at the rank of major on October 31, 1930, and died in Rome, New York on February 18, 1950. He is buried in Rome Cemetery.

== See also ==
- List of Medal of Honor recipients
- List of Medal of Honor recipients for the Indian Wars
- List of Medal of Honor Awardees from Minnesota
