= 3rd Infantry Regiment (United States) =

United States Army combat formation

3rd Infantry Regiment (The Old Guard)
- 3rd Infantry Regiment coat of arms
- Active: 3 June 1784—20 Nov 1946; 6 April 1948—present
- Country: United States
- Branch: United States Army
- Type: Infantry
- Role: Honor Guard, Presidential Escort, Light Infantry, Military Security (two battalions); Stryker Infantry (one battalion)
- Size: Four battalions (three active)
- Part of: Military District of Washington
- Garrison/HQ: 1st Battalion – Fort Myer, VA; 2nd Battalion – Fort Lewis, WA; 4th Battalion – Fort Myer
- Nickname: "The Old Guard"
- Mottos: Noli Me Tangere ("Touch Me Not")
- Colors: Buff and black (historical)
- March: The Old Guard March
- Anniversaries: 21 September-Organization Day
- Engagements: Indian Wars: Hardin's Defeat; Battle of the Wabash; Battle of Fallen Timbers; Battle of Sugar Point; War of 1812: Capture of Mobile; Siege of Fort Meigs; Battle of Fort Stephenson; Mexican–American War; American Civil War; Spanish–American War; Philippine-American War; World War II; Vietnam War; Global War on Terrorism: Operation Iraqi Freedom; Operation Enduring Freedom
- Decorations: Valorous Unit Award (2); Meritorious Unit Commendation (4); Army Superior Unit Award (4)
- Website: https://jtfncr.mdw.army.mil/TOG/

Commanders
- Current commander: COL Jeffrey Kain
- Command Sergeant Major: CSM Nicholas Rockey
- Notable commanders: Henry Leavenworth; Paul Octave Hébert; Ethan A. Hitchcock; Benjamin Bonneville; John W. Heavey; Alfred W. Bjornstad; Walter C. Sweeney Sr.; David L. Stone; Charles F. Thompson; Leland S. Hobbs

Insignia
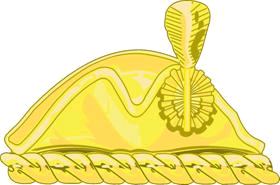
- Distinctive unit insignia

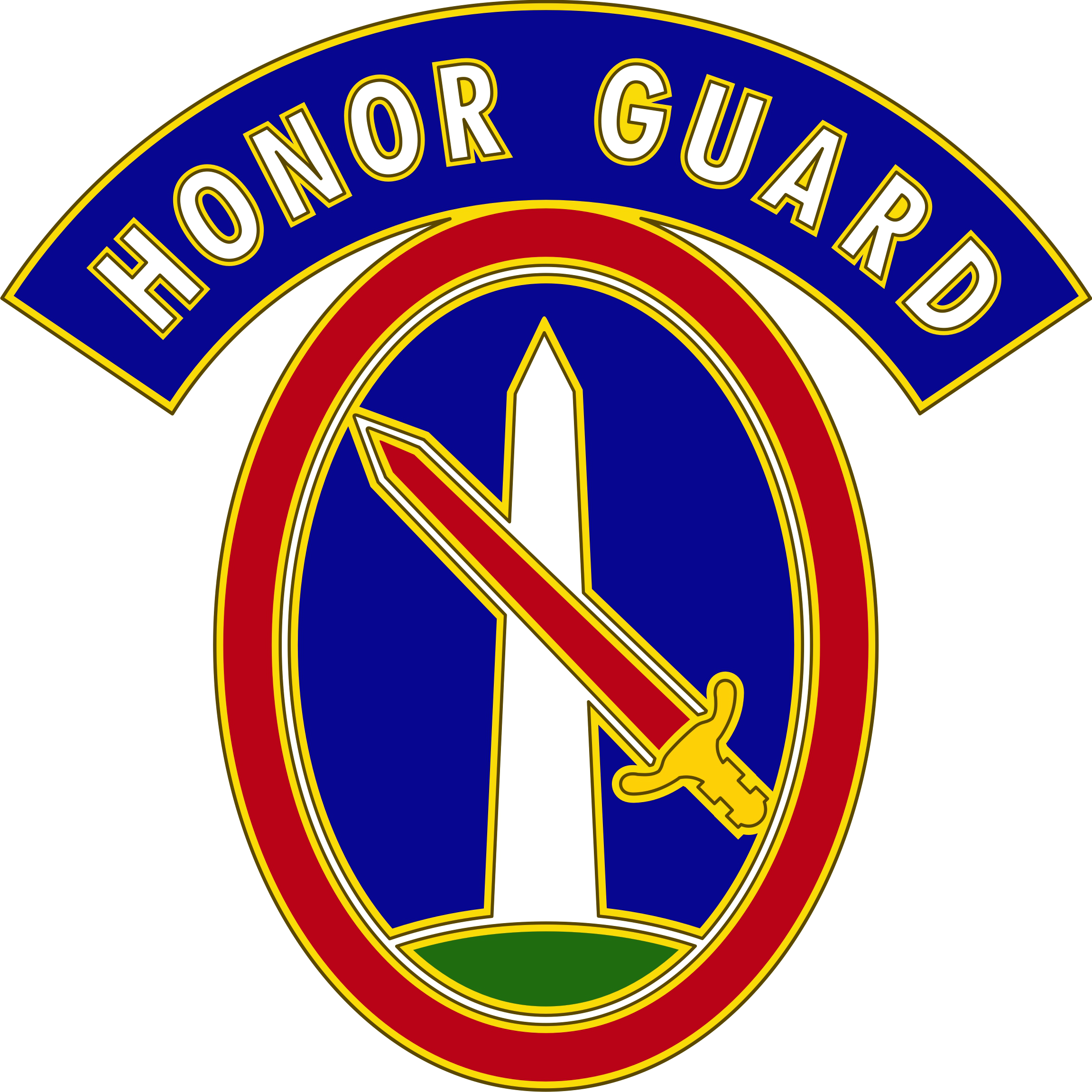
- Combat service identification badge

- Distinctive Trimming (Buff Strap)

The 3rd Infantry Regiment is an infantry regiment of the United States Army. It currently comprises three active battalions and is readily identified by its nickname, The Old Guard. The regimental motto, Noli Me Tangere (“Touch Me Not”), reflects a longstanding tradition of discipline and vigilance. The regiment is a key component of the Military District of Washington (MDW) and is the oldest active regiment in the Regular Army, first organized as the First American Regiment in 1784. Since World War II, The Old Guard has served as the official Army Honor Guard and Escort to the President.

== Mission ==
The regiment's mission is to conduct memorial affairs to honor fallen comrades and ceremonies and special events to represent the U.S. Army, communicating its story to United States citizens and the world. Although The Old Guard primarily functions in a ceremonial role, it is an infantry unit and thus required to meet standards for certification in its combat role. The unit also trains for its support role to civil authorities in a wide range of scenarios and for deployments in support of overseas contingency operations. On order, it conducts defense in support of civil authorities in the National Capital Region and deploys elements in support of overseas contingency operations.

== Memorial affairs and ceremonial mission ==
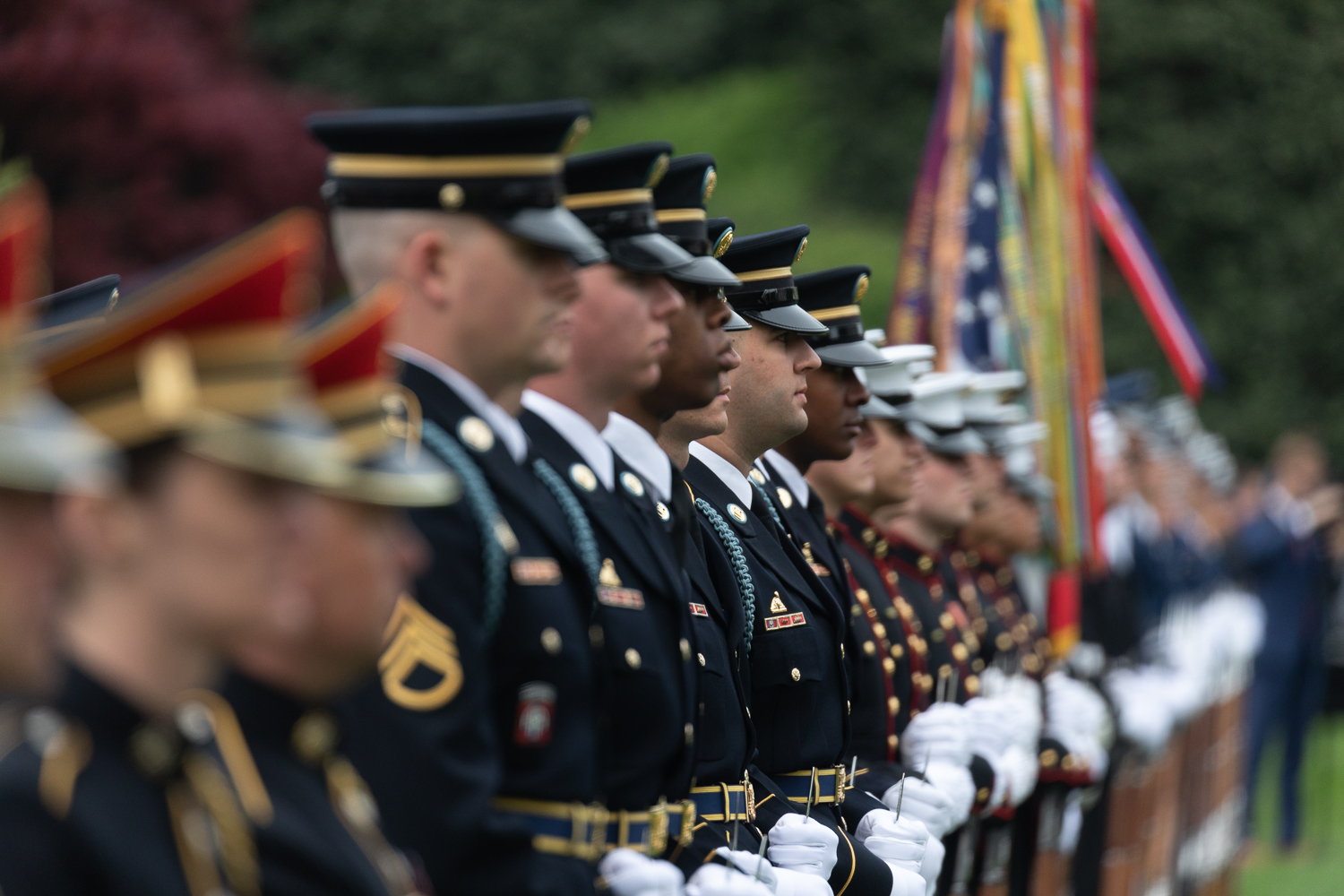
The 3rd Infantry during a welcome for French President Emmanuel Macron and his wife for his first state visit to Washington, 23 April 2018

The 1st and 4th Battalions perform a variety of ceremonial and honorary duties. Memorial affairs missions include standard and full honors funerals in Arlington National Cemetery and dignified transfers at Dover Air Force Base. Old Guard soldiers also perform all dignified transfers of fallen soldiers returning to the United States.

The Old Guard's ceremonial task list includes full honor arrivals for visiting dignitaries, wreath-laying ceremonies at the Tomb of the Unknown Soldier, and full honor reviews in support of senior army leaders and retiring soldiers. Special events include the Twilight Tattoo, a weekly performance in the adjacent Washington area on Wednesday evenings from May to July, and the Spirit of America, a historical pageant presented at three national venues in September. The Old Guard is the only unit in the U.S. Armed Forces authorized, by a 1922 decree of the War Department, to march with fixed bayonets in all parades. This was granted in honor of the 1847 bayonet charge by the regiment during the Battle of Cerro Gordo in the war with Mexico. The Tomb of the Unknown Soldier is protected round the clock by the 4th Battalion's Tomb Guard Platoon, 24 hours a day, 7 days a week, 365 days a year.

=== Specialty units ===
In addition to the marching platoons, there are also elements of The Old Guard that serve special roles unique both to the regiment as well as the U.S. Army. Among these include the sentinels of the Tomb of the Unknown Soldier, maintaining a twenty-four-hour watch over one of the nation's most sacred sites; the Continental Color Guard, which presents the nation's colors at special events across the Capitol Region; the Presidential Salute Battery, which renders honors to senior dignitaries at arrival and wreath ceremonies, reviews, and full honors funerals; and the U.S. Army Caisson Platoon, which provides horses and riders to pull the caisson (the wagon that bears a casket) in military and state funerals.

The Caisson Platoon also provides the riderless horses used in full honors funerals and supports wounded warriors participating in the Therapeutic Riding Program. Other elements of The Old Guard include Company A (Commander-In-Chief's Guard), replicating the personal guard of General George Washington; wearing Colonial blue uniforms, powdered wigs, and cocked hats; and bearing Brown Bess muskets and halberds at ceremonies and special events; the U.S. Army Drill Team, which demonstrates its skill and precision around the nation, and Old Guard Fife and Drum Corps, which plays traditional arrangements of marching music, dating back to the time of the Continental Army. The Old Guard Fife and Drum Corps marches in Colonial style red-coated uniforms—to be "better seen through the smoke of battle"; the uniforms also include cocked hats and white powdered wigs. The drum major of the Fife and Drum Corps traditionally bears an espontoon (a historic pike-like weapon) in his right hand to direct and command his unit. As such, he is the only soldier in all the U.S. Armed Forces authorized to bear a spontoon and to salute with the left hand (although U.S. Navy personnel are allowed to salute with the left hand under certain conditions). Rounding out The Old Guard are the 289th Military Police Company, the 947th Military Working Dog Detachment, the 529th Regimental Support Company, two battalion headquarters companies, and the regimental headquarters company.

==== Unique badges awarded to specific members of "The Old Guard" ====
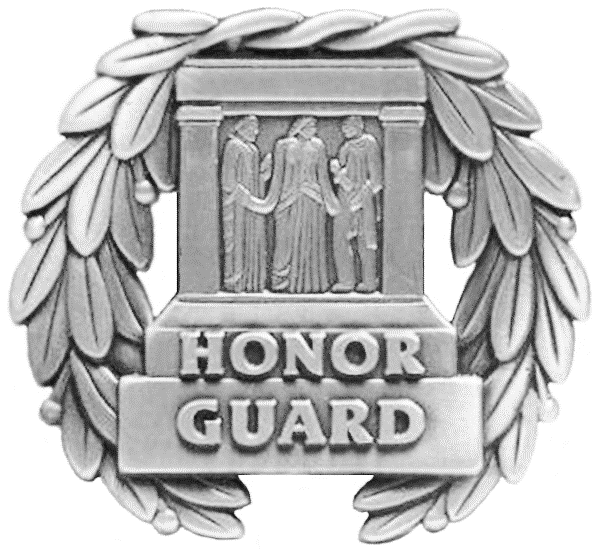
Guard, Tomb of the Unknown Soldier Identification Badge, awarded to eligible sentinels from the Tomb Guard Platoon.

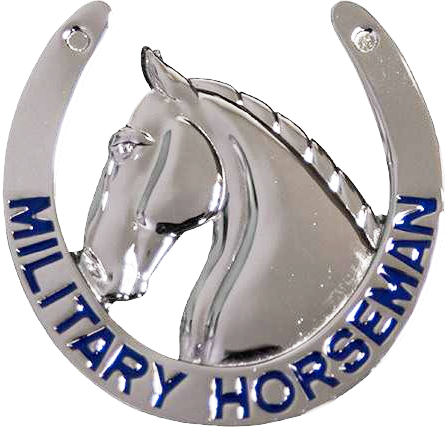
Military Horseman Identification Badge, awarded to eligible horsemen from the Caisson Platoon

=== Escort Platoon ===
Escort Platoon is a term referring to a platoon of soldiers in the U.S. Army's 3rd Infantry Regiment whose primary ceremonial mission is to march in ceremonies or military funerals. Generally, line infantry companies delegate the escort role to their 1st platoon. This platoon is generally composed of the tallest soldiers assigned to the unit. The regiment's Presidential Escort Platoon, Honor Guard Company, is based at Fort Myer. The platoon serves at presidential funerals, inaugurations, Pentagon retirements, state dinners and state visits at the White House, and during presidential speeches in the Rose Garden, among other duties.

=== Uniforms and insignia ===
When on duty, members of the 3rd Infantry Regiment wear the standard dark blue Army Service Uniform and the infantry shoulder cord. Prior to its introduction in 2008, it was known as the Dress Blue Uniform and worn only by units that required their wear, such as the 3rd Infantry. The 'blues' date back to the early 1950s, and were rarely worn by regular units, being an optional uniform along with the Dress Whites. Worn on the left shoulder is a black distinctive trimming, also known as a buff strap. On the shoulder of the Army Service Uniform, a blue tab with "HONOR GUARD" embroidered on it in white letters is worn. Nameplates are not worn for uniformity, and instead of ribbons, medals are worn. Pinned to the top right chest pocket is a badge unique to the Old Guard, bearing the shape of the Tomb and surrounded by laurels.

== Current organization of the 3rd Infantry Regiment ==
=== Regimental Headquarters and Headquarters Company ===
- Headquarters and Headquarters Company (HHC)
  - Headquarters Platoon
  - Coordinating Staff
    - RS-1 (Administration)
    - RS-2 (Intelligence)
    - RS-3 (Operations)
      - Chemical, Biological, Radiological, and Nuclear
      - Operations
      - Drafters and Announcers
    - RS-4 (Logistics)
      - Property Book Office
      - Ceremonial Equipment Branch
    - RS-6 (Communications)
      - Communications
      - IMO (Information Management Operations)
  - Legal Office
  - Chaplains Office
  - Public Affairs Office
  - Regimental Recruiters
  - The Old Guard Museum

=== 1st Battalion 3rd U.S. Infantry Regiment ===
The 1st Battalion is composed of the following units:

- HHC
  - Battalion Staff Sections: (S1, S2, S3, S4, S6)
  - Caisson Platoon
  - Presidential Salute Battery
  - Headquarters Platoon
- Company B
  - Escort Platoon
  - Casket Platoon
  - Firing Party Platoon
  - Headquarters Platoon
- Company C
  - Escort Platoon
  - Casket Platoon
  - Firing Party Platoon
  - Headquarters Platoon
- Company D
  - Escort Platoon
  - Casket Platoon
  - Firing Party Platoon
  - Headquarters Platoon
- Company H
  - Escort Platoon
  - Casket Platoon
  - Firing Party Platoon
  - Headquarters Platoon

=== 2nd Battalion 3rd U.S. Infantry Regiment ===
Stationed at Fort Lewis, Washington, the 2nd Battalion, 3rd U.S. Infantry Regiment, serves as one of three infantry battalions of the 1st Stryker Brigade Combat Team of the 7th Infantry Division. After a 31-year hiatus from service, the 2nd Battalion was reactivated on 15 March 2001 as part of the U.S. Army's first Stryker brigade (inactive) combat team. It served as part of the first deployment of a Stryker brigade combat team in 2003. It then served a 15-month deployment in 2006–2007 during which it was awarded the Valorous Unit Award. It deployed to Iraq again in 2009 and Afghanistan in 2011. From 1966 to 1970, the 2nd Battalion was part of the 199th Light Infantry Brigade and 23rd Infantry Division in Vietnam. The 2nd Battalion has the following units:

- HHC
  - Scout Platoon
  - Mortar Platoon
  - Medical Platoon
  - Battalion Staff Sections: (S1, S2, S3, S4, S6)
- Company A
  - First Platoon
  - Second Platoon
  - Third Platoon
  - Mortar Section
- Company B
  - First Platoon
  - Second Platoon
  - Third Platoon
  - Mortar Section
- Company C
  - First Platoon
  - Second Platoon
  - Third Platoon
  - Mortar Section
- Company G
  - Headquarters/Field Feeding Team Platoon
  - Maintenance Platoon
  - Distribution Platoon

=== 4th Battalion 3rd U.S. Infantry Regiment ===
From 1966 to 1974, the 4th Battalion was part of the 11th and 198th Infantry Brigades and 23rd Infantry Division in Vietnam. The 4th Battalion was reactivated at Fort Myer in 2008.

The 4th Battalion is composed of the following units:

- HHC
  - Tomb Guard Platoon, Tomb of the Unknown Soldier
  - The United States Army Drill Team
  - Battalion Staff Sections: (S1, S2, S3, S4, S6)
- Company A (Commander-in-Chief's Guard)
  - Three Colonial Marching Platoons
- Company E (Honor Guard Company)
  - Presidential Escort Platoon (Echo 1)
  - Presidential Casket Platoon
  - Presidential Firing Party (Jack of All Trades)
  - Continental Color Guard
- 289th Military Police Company
  - Special Reaction Team
  - 947th Military Police Detachment (K-9)
- The Old Guard Fife and Drum Corps
- 529th Regimental Support Company
  - Headquarters Section
  - Food Service Platoon
  - Maintenance Platoon
  - Transportation Platoon
  - Medical Platoon

== Operational history ==
=== Background ===
At the conclusion of the American Revolution, the great majority of the Continental Army was discharged in November 1783. One regiment, composed mostly of soldiers from New England, remained in the army under the command of Brevet Brigadier General Henry Jackson of Massachusetts. This regiment was discharged on 20 June 1784 leaving a single artillery company, under the command of Brevet Major John Doughty, to guard military stores at West Point, New York and Pittsburgh, Pennsylvania. The Confederation Congress recognized the need for army to protect the frontiers of the new nation and authorized an infantry regiment for that purpose.

=== Early years ===
The 3rd Infantry Regiment (a.k.a. "The Old Guard") traces its history to the First American Regiment organized on 12 August 1784 under the command of Lieutenant Colonel Commandant Josiah Harmar, a veteran of the American Revolution. The 1st Infantry saw its first combat in an unsuccessful campaign against the Miami tribe near modern-day Fort Wayne, Indiana in 1790. This was followed by devastating losses at St. Clair's defeat in 1791.

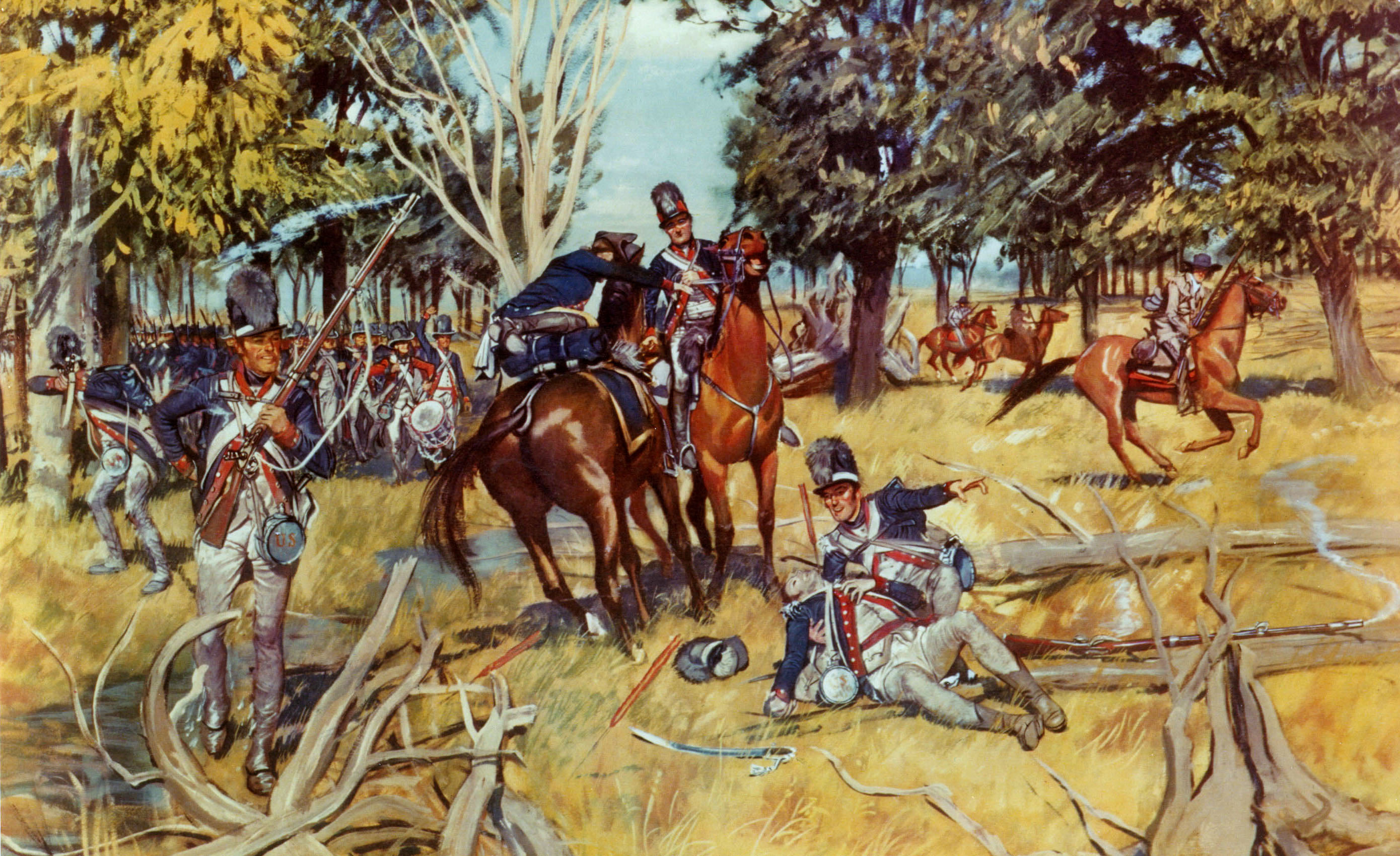
Artists depiction of Anthony Wayne near the banks of the Maumee River in Ohio, August 1794

In 1792 the United States Army was reorganized into the Legion of the United States, with the 1st Infantry forming the nucleus of the 1st Sub-Legion. (Sub-Legions were the remote ancestors of today's Brigade Combat Teams, with organic Infantry, Cavalry and Artillery units.) On 20 August 1794, along with most of the Legion's units under the command of Major General Anthony Wayne, the 1st Sub-Legion was engaged at the decisive victory of the Legion over the Miamis at the Battle of Fallen Timbers.

In 1795 the Legion was reorganized along more traditional lines and reverted to being called the United States Army. In the reorganization the 1st Sub-Legion was redesignated as the 1st Infantry Regiment.

As of 1805, six of the regiment's ten companies were in St. Louis, Missouri, with the other four located at Fort Massac, Fort Dearborn, Fort Adams, Mississippi and Fort Wayne in Detroit.

=== War of 1812 and reorganization of the Army ===
During the War of 1812, the 1st Infantry served in Upper Canada and saw action at the battles of Chippewa and Lundy's Lane. These actions give the regiment campaign credit for the War of 1812.

After the end of the War of 1812 in early 1815, the Army had a total of 44 Infantry regiments which were consolidated into only eight regiments. Rather than preserving the existing designations of the Army's oldest units, it was decided instead to consolidate units based on their geographic proximity rather than seniority. On 17 May 1815, the 1st Infantry was consolidated with five other regiments to form the 3rd Infantry. This is why the 3rd Infantry is the oldest Infantry unit in the active United States Army rather than the 1st Infantry.

=== 1815 to 1861 ===
As of 30 November 1819, the regiment was located on the northwestern frontier at Fort Howard in Green Bay, Wisconsin. As of 9 November 1822, the regiment had six companies in Green Bay, two in Sarnac, and two in Chicago.

The annual report of the Army from 1826 showed that the regiment had been re-located to Jefferson Barracks, Missouri.

As of November 1837, the regiment's headquarters and six companies were at Fort Jesup in Louisiana, with the other four companies at Fort Towson in Oklahoma.

From 1840 to 1843, the 3rd Infantry fought in the Seminole War in Florida.

During the Mexican War, the regiment fought in most of the major battles of the war, including Palo Alto, Monterey, the invasion and Siege of Veracruz, Cerro Gordo, Churubusco, and Chapultepec, which led to the capture and occupation of Mexico City.

From 1856 to 1860, the regiment served in New Mexico, where it fought the Navajo Indian tribe.

After serving in New Mexico, the regiment was spread out to various posts along the Gulf of Mexico, from Florida to Texas.

=== American Civil War ===
The 3rd Infantry saw extensive service during the United States Civil War and was credited with 12 campaigns. Detachments from the regiment were serving at Fort Pickens in Florida and in Saluria on the Gulf Coast of Texas when the war began in April 1861. Three companies of the 3rd Infantry surrendered on 25 April. Five of the regiment's 10 companies were engaged at the Battle of Bull Run on 20 July 1861.

The regiment spent most of the war assigned to the Army of the Potomac and served primarily in Virginia. From May 1862 to December 1863, it served with the 1st Brigade, 2nd Division of the 5th Corps. During this period, the regiment participated in the Siege of Yorktown (part of the Peninsular Campaign), the Battle of Malvern Hill, the Second Battle of Bull Run, the Battle of Antietam, the Battle of Fredericksburg, the Battle of Chancellorsville, and the Battle of Gettysburg.

In December 1863, the regiment was sent to New York City, where it remained until October 1864, when it was sent to Washington, D.C. In February 1865, it was sent to rejoin the Army of the Potomac as its headquarters guard and was present at the Battle of Appomattox in April 1865.

=== 1865 to 1917 ===
After the Civil War, the 3rd Infantry served in Kansas, Colorado and the Indian Territory (later the state of Oklahoma) from 1866 to 1874. It then served in Louisiana and Mississippi from 1874 to 1877, and Montana, Minnesota and South Dakota from 1877 to 1898.

During the Spanish–American War, the regiment served in Cuba from 14 June – 25 August 1898, where it participated in the Santiago Campaign and fought at the Battle of El Caney.

After the end of hostilities in Cuba, the 3rd Infantry returned to its garrison at Fort Snelling in Minnesota. On 5 October 1898, a force of about 80 men—including soldiers of the 3rd Infantry, U.S. Marshals and Indian Police—fought in the Battle of Sugar Point against 17 members of the local Pillager Band of Chippewa Indians near the Leech Lake Reservation. The United States forces lost 6 soldiers and one Indian Police officer killed and another 14 wounded. There were no casualties among the Chippewa. Hospital Steward (later Major) Oscar Burkard received the Medal of Honor for rescuing casualties during the battle. The Battle of Sugar Point was the last battle fought between the United States Army and Native Americans.

The 3rd Infantry sailed from New York on 3 February 1899 aboard the U.S. Army Transport Sherman. It reached Manila, The Philippines on 22 March 1899 via the Suez Canal. The regiment fought in the Philippine–American War until 15 April 1902. It then returned to the United States where it was stationed in Kentucky, Ohio and Illinois. It was then sent to Alaska where it served from 1 July 1904, to 6 August 1906, when it was sent to Washington state until it was sent back to the Philippines about 1909.

As of August 1914 the regiment's headquarters, along with the 2nd and 3rd Battalions, were located at Madison Barracks, New York. The 1st Battalion was located at Fort Ontario, New York.

=== Mexican Border and World War I ===
In 1916, the 3rd Infantry, then commanded by Colonel Julius Penn, was sent to the Texas-Mexico Border during the Pancho Villa Expedition and guarded against a possible invasion. One of the regiment's officers at this time was 2nd Lieutenant James Van Fleet, who graduated West Point in 1915 and would rise to four-star general during the Korean War.

During World War I, the headquarters of the 3rd Infantry, along with the 3rd Battalion, was posted at Camp Eagle Pass in Texas. The 1st Battalion was located at Del Rio, Texas and the 2nd Battalion was at Fort Sam Houston. Throughout the war the regiment was assigned to patrolling the Mexican Border and did not see action.

During World War I, West Point graduate Captain Matthew Ridgway was assigned to the 3rd Infantry. Ridgway would go on to have a highly distinguished 38-year career including assignments as commander of the 82nd Airborne Division, XVIII Airborne Corps, 8th United States Army, United Nations Command Korea, Supreme Allied Commander Europe and Chief of Staff of the United States Army.

=== Interwar period (1919–39) ===
Following the establishment of the United States Border Patrol, the 3rd Infantry was relocated to Camp Sherman in Ohio on 14 October 1920. The regiment marched 941 miles from Camp Sherman to Fort Snelling, Minnesota, arriving on 17 November 1921. Upon arrival the 2nd and 3rd Battalions were inactivated on 18 November 1921, and the 1st Battalion assumed garrison duties. The regiment was re-organized as a combat regiment when the 2nd and 3rd Battalions were re-activated on 8 June 1922.

On 24 March 1923, the regiment was assigned to the 7th Division. On 15 August 1927 the regiment was reassigned to the 6th Division.

On 1 October 1933, the regiment reverted to being assigned to the 7th Division. On 22 April 1939 the regiment conducted a review for Crown Prince Frederik and Princess Ingrid of Denmark.

=== World War II ===
During World War II, the 3rd Infantry served most of the war as a separate regiment and was not assigned to a combat division until 50 days before the German surrender.

On 16 October 1939, it was relieved from assignment to the 7th Division and assigned to the 6th Division at Fort Jackson, South Carolina. In November 1940, the 1st Battalion was relocated to Fort Crook, Nebraska. The regiment was relieved from assignment to the 6th Division on 10 May 1941. The 3rd Battalion departed from New York on 20 January 1941 and was sent to St. John's, Newfoundland before moving to Fort Pepperrell in the Newfoundland Base Command in November 1941.

The 1st Battalion was inactivated 1 June 1941 at Fort Leonard Wood, Missouri, with its soldiers being assigned to the 63rd Infantry and was re-activated 14 February 1942 in Newfoundland. The remainder of the regiment was sent to Camp Ripley, Minnesota, on 13 September 1941 and returned to Fort Snelling on 26 September.

When the United States declared war on Japan in December 1941, the regiment was stationed at Fort Snelling. The 2nd Battalion was inactivated 1 September 1942 at Fort Snelling.

The regiment arrived in Boston on 17 September 1943 and moved to Camp Butner, North Carolina, on 22 September 1943 where it was attached to the XII Corps. The 2nd Battalion was re-activated on 22 October 1943 at Camp Butner. The regiment was moved to Fort Benning, Georgia, on 8 March 1944, where it provided cadre for the Infantry School.

Late in the war, the regiment staged at Camp Myles Standish, near Taunton, Massachusetts, on 27 February 1945, and departed from Boston bound for France on 8 March 1945.

The regiment arrived in Le Havre, France on 18 March 1945, and was attached to the reconstituted 106th Infantry Division with the mission of containing the isolated German garrison at St. Nazaire. The regiment moved with the 106th Division into Germany on 26 April 1945—twelve days before the surrender of Germany—and processed prisoners of war. The regiment was then assigned to duty in the occupation of Germany and was located at Babenhausen. The 3rd Infantry was inactivated on 20 November 1946 in Berlin.

The 3rd Infantry was credited with the American Theater streamer for its defense of Newfoundland. It was also credited with the European Theater Northern France Campaign streamer, even though the Northern France Campaign technically ended on 14 September 1944. However theater commanders were authorized to award Campaign Participation Credit to select campaigns even after the technical end of that campaign, the Northern France Campaign being one of those, since the 3rd Infantry Regiment assisted with the mission of containing the German Garrison at St. Nazaire.

=== Post World War II ===
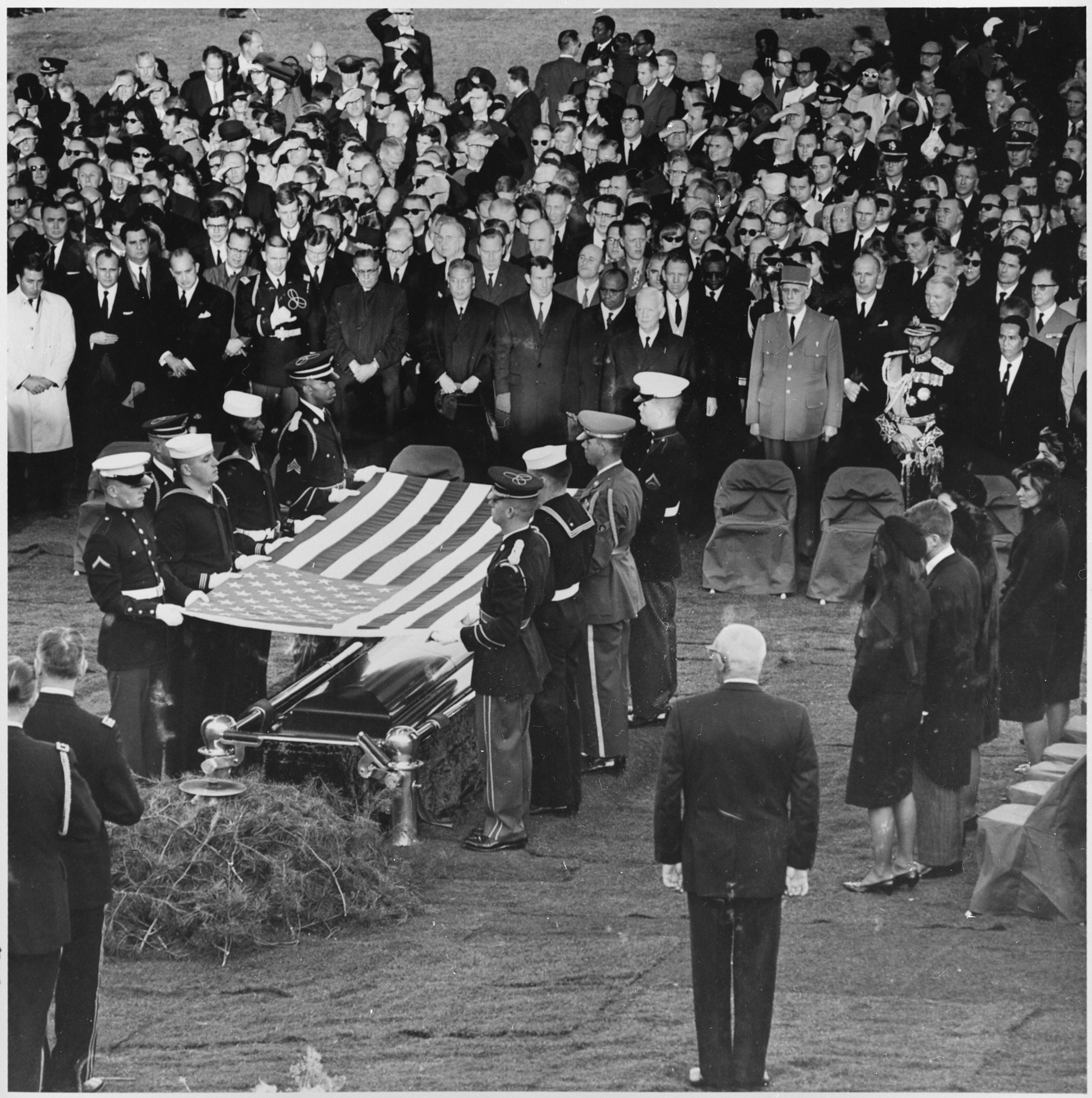
Honor guards remove the flag from the casket of President John F. Kennedy at Arlington National Cemetery (25 November 1963)

The 3rd Infantry Regiment (less the 2nd Battalion) was re-activated on 6 April 1948 at Fort Myer, Virginia. The 2nd Battalion was concurrently re-activated at Fort Lesley J. McNair, Washington, D.C. This was when the unit assumed the role it is best known for today as the official ceremonial unit of the United States Army. The regiment's reactivation was shortly before the state funeral of General of the Armies John J. Pershing held on 19 July 1948 in which soldiers of the 3d Infantry played a prominent role. This was the beginning of the 3d Infantry's current mission of performing ceremonial duties in the Washington, D.C. area.

The Old Guard gained national attention for the support it provided to the state funeral of President John F. Kennedy in November 1963. Aside from the Kennedy funeral, the Old Guard has also supported state funerals for the Unknown Soldiers of World War II, Korea and Vietnam as well as presidents Herbert Hoover, Dwight D. Eisenhower, Harry Truman, Lyndon B. Johnson, Richard Nixon, Ronald Reagan, Gerald R. Ford, George H. W. Bush and Jimmy Carter. Other persons who have received state funerals the Old Guard has supported included General John J. Pershing, General Douglas MacArthur, Vice President Hubert Humphrey and Medal of Honor recipient Senator Daniel Inouye.

Aside from supporting military and state funerals, the 3rd Infantry also assumed the responsibility for providing the guard detail at the Tomb of the Unknown Soldier in Arlington National Cemetery and for providing honor guards at the White House for high ranking dignitaries.

=== The 2nd Battalion in Vietnam (1966-1970) ===
On 1 June 1966, the 2nd Battalion was activated at Fort Benning, Georgia and assigned to the 199th Infantry Brigade (199th LIB). The 199th LIB deployed to South Vietnam in December 1966 operating throughout III Corps.

On 3 July 1969 while Company D, 2nd Battalion was patrolling in Long Khanh Province during Operation Toan Thang III it was ambushed by the People's Army of Vietnam 33rd Regiment losing nine killed including Corporal Michael Fleming Folland who smothered an enemy hand grenade with his body, he was later posthumously awarded the Medal of Honor.

The 199th LIB returned to the United States in 1970 and the 2nd Battalion was inactivated on 15 October 1970 at Fort Benning.

=== The 4th Battalion in Vietnam (1967–68) ===
The 4th Battalion of The Old Guard was officially activated at Schofield Barracks, Hawaii, on 1 July 1966, and commanded by LTC Harold J. Meyer. The battalion consisted initially of Headquarters and Headquarters Company and A Company, containing one officer/five enlisted men and twenty one enlisted men respectively. By 31 December 1966, the battalion strength had increased to 37 officers, two warrant officers and 492 enlisted men.

When the battalion was reactivated, it utilized facilities formerly occupied by elements of the 25th infantry Division. During the period of 1 July 1966 through 10 September 1966, the battalion conducted preparation for Basic Unit Training since most of the Old Guard's lower enlisted personnel had never served with a regular unit. The non-commissioned officers, on the other hand, were greatly experienced with many recent returns from Vietnam.

During its preparation for service in South Vietnam, the 4th Battalion was assigned to the 11th Infantry Brigade. On 15 August 1967, the 11th Infantry Brigade adopted the "light Infantry" concept. By selecting one rifle platoon and personnel from the weapons platoon from each line company, an additional line company, delta, was introduced to the battalion. Further by removing the 4.2" mortar and reconnaissance platoons and the ground surveillance section from the former headquarters company, a combat support company, Echo, was created with these two changes to the battalion, the revised strength authorization totaled 44 officers, 1 warrant officer and 886 enlisted men.

On 7 July 1967, the battalion conducted a farewell review for its departing commander, Lieutenant Colonel Meyer and simultaneously Major C. Hartsfield assumed interim command of the battalion. On 20 July, the battalion welcomed Lieutenant Colonel Alvin E. Adkins as its new commander. Adkins had previously served in World War II, the Korean and Vietnam Wars.

On 25 December, personnel of the advance party, including LTC Adkins, the company commanders and additional key staff members departed by aircraft for South Vietnam. Shortly thereafter at 23:30 on 5 December the main body left Honolulu pier 40 on the USNS General W. H. Gordon. After 14 days at sea, the main body arrived at Qui Nhon harbor and proceeded by vehicle convoy north along Highway 1 to Đức Phổ Base Camp and a base of operations known as Carentan. In-country training and combat operations commenced immediately, throughout the remainder of 1967 the battalion conducted search and destroy missions outside Carentan and to the west of Đức Phổ.

On 16 March 1968, Company B was landed by helicopters near Mỹ Khê, Quảng Ngãi Province and participated in the killing of between 347 and 504 civilians in the My Lai Massacre.

=== Global war on terrorism ===
On 12 November 2003, the 2nd Battalion deployed to Iraq with the 3d Brigade (Stryker), 2nd Infantry Division to begin a tour of duty in support of Operation Iraqi Freedom. This was the first deployment of an element of The Old Guard since the Vietnam War. Operating first in the dangerous Sunni Triangle area under command of the 4th Infantry Division, the soldiers of the 2nd Battalion, 3rd Infantry relieved troops of the 101st Airborne Division in January 2004 in northern Iraq. The 2nd Battalion began redeployment back to the United States in October 2004.

Another historic event occurred on 15 December 2003, when Bravo Company of the 1st Battalion deployed from Fort Myer, Virginia, for duty in the U.S. Central Command area of operations. This was the first deployment of an element of The Old Guard's 1st Battalion since World War II. Bravo Company, also called Task Force Bravo and Team Battlehard, arrived in the U.S. Central Command area of operations to take up duty in Djibouti on the Horn of Africa on 17 December 2003. The soldiers of The Old Guard served in support of Combined Joint Task Force-Horn of Africa (CJTF-HOA) and Operation Enduring Freedom. Based at Camp Lemonnier, their missions in the region included force protection to civil affairs and engineer personnel, engaging in joint operations with other U.S. and regional military forces and constant training to stay prepared. Team Battlehard redeployed back to Fort Myer in July 2004.

In 2007, 1st Battalion's Delta Company was deployed to Camp Lemonnier, Djibouti as part of CJTF-HOA, supporting humanitarian missions and local military training in the region.

Charlie Company, 1st Battalion deployed to Camp Taji, Iraq, in 2009 to execute its theater internment support mission.

In December 2011, 2nd Battalion deployed to Kandahar Province in Afghanistan, where they were responsible for providing base security for U.S. Army Special Forces and U.S. Navy SEALs who were engaged in village stability operations.

=== Current duties ===
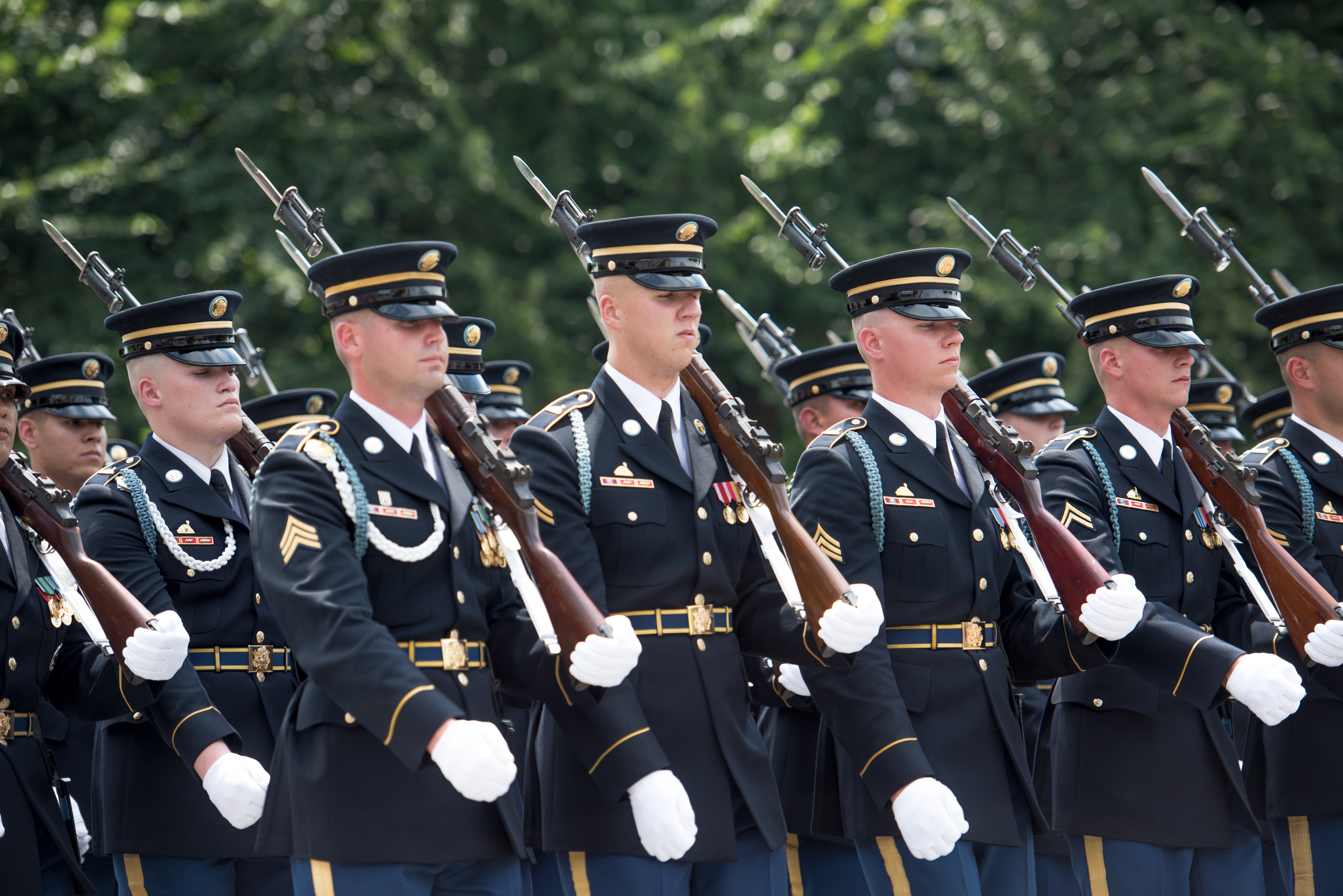
The Old Guard during the 2019 National Independence Day Parade in Washington, D.C.

The Old Guard's current duties include, but are not limited to, providing funeral details at Arlington National Cemetery, guarding the Tomb of the Unknown Soldier, providing honor guards for visiting dignitaries, supporting official ceremonies and providing a quick reaction force for the Washington, D.C. metropolitan area.

As of 2018, there were three active battalions of the 3d Infantry Regiment.

- 1st Battalion assigned to the Military District of Washington, Fort Myer, Virginia
- 2nd Battalion assigned to the 1st Stryker Brigade Combat Team, 7th Infantry Division, JBLM, Washington
- 4th Battalion assigned to the Military District of Washington, Fort Myer, Virginia

== Medals of Honor ==
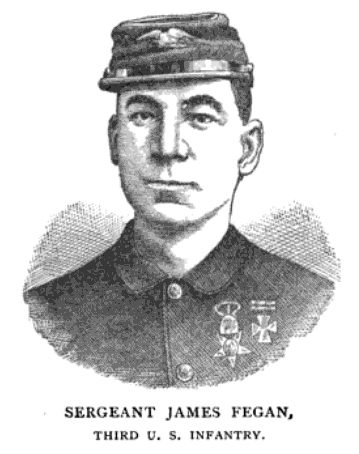
James Fegan

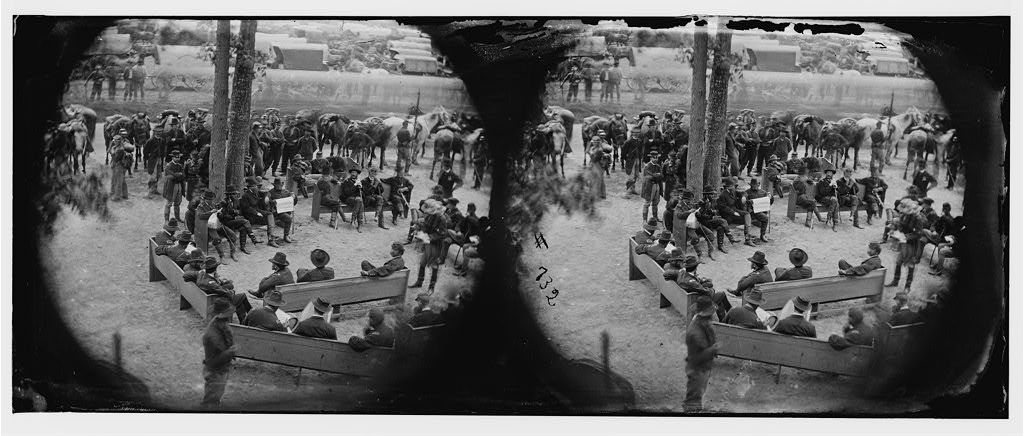
Leander Herron is in the left background (standing sideways)

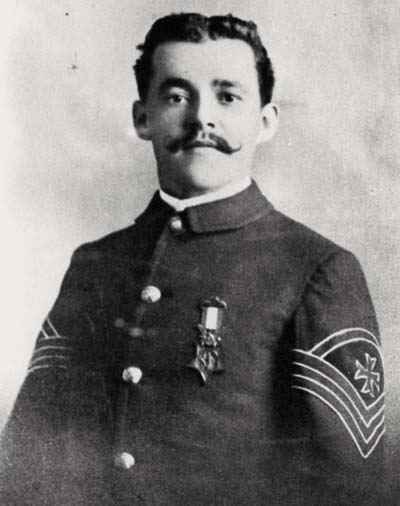
Oscar Burkard

The following 3rd Infantry soldiers have been awarded the Medal of Honor:

Indian Wars
- Sergeant James Fegan, Company H, March 1868, Plum Creek, Kansas

- Corporal Leander Herron, Company A, 2 September 1868, near Fort Dodge, Kansas

- Hospital Steward Oscar Burkard of the U.S. Army Hospital Corps, attached to the 3rd U.S. Infantry, received the Medal of Honor for his actions on 5 October 1898 in the Battle of Sugar Point at Leech Lake, Minnesota. It is listed by the U.S. Office of Medical History as the last Medal of Honor awarded in an Indian campaign.

Vietnam War
- Corporal Michael Fleming Folland, Company D, 2nd Battalion, 3 July 1969, Long Khanh (posthumous)

== Notable members of the regiment ==
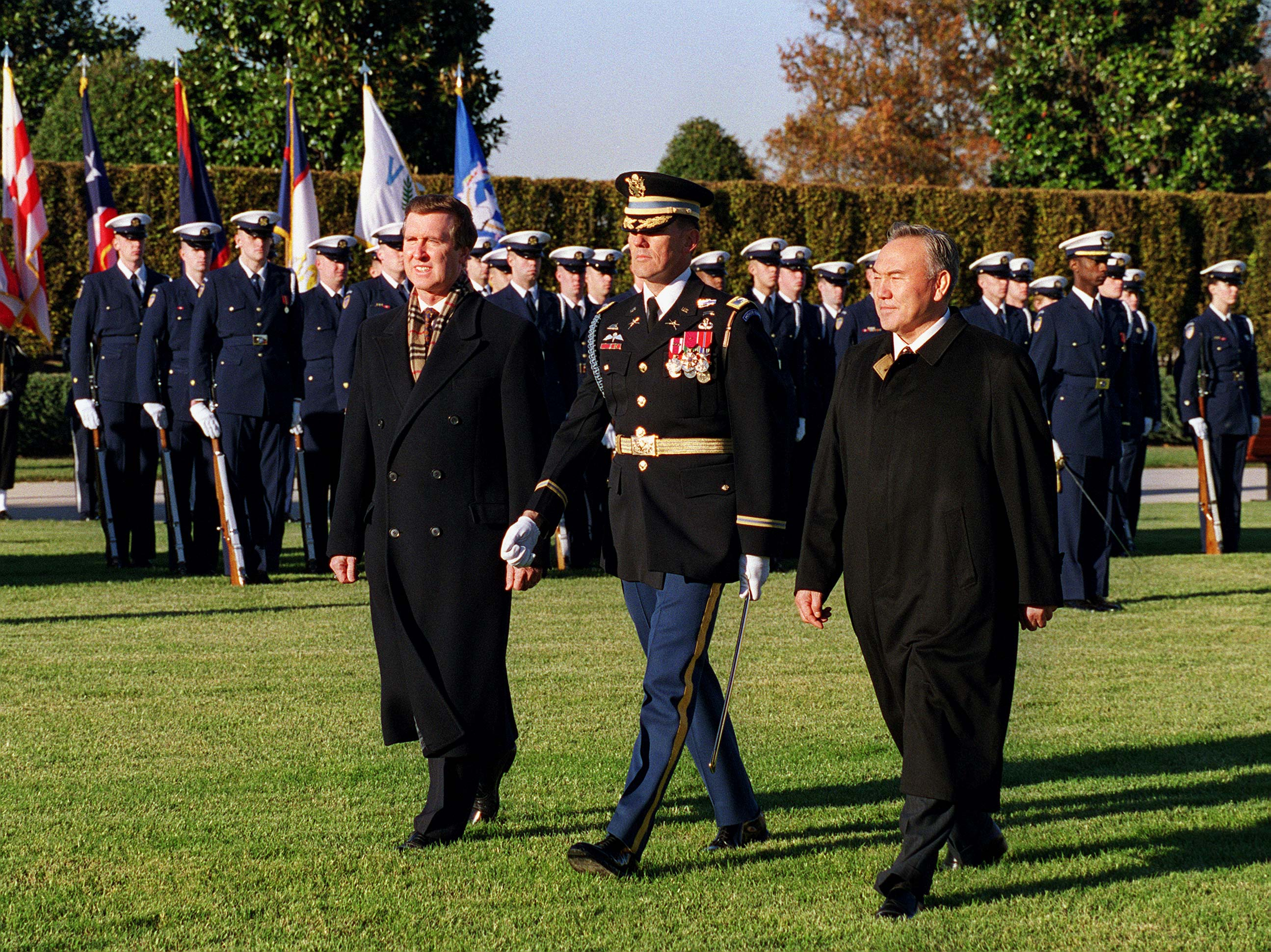
Secretary of Defense William Cohen (left) and President Nursultan Nazarbayev of Kazakhstan (right), escorted by Colonel Gregory Gardner (center) of the 3rd Infantry Regiment inspect the joint services honor guard during a full honor military arrival ceremony for Nazarbayev at The Pentagon, 17 November 1997.

- Major General and President William Henry Harrison
- Major General and President Zachary Taylor
- General Matthew Ridgway
- General James Van Fleet
- Major General Benjamin Bonneville
- Major General Harry J. Collins
- Major General George W. Getty
- Major General Ethan A. Hitchcock
- Brigadier General Thomas S. Jesup
- Brigadier General Zebulon Pike
- Brigadier General Thomas Humphrey Cushing
- Brigadier General Julius Penn
- Brevet Brigadier General Josiah Harmar
- Brevet Brigadier General Henry Leavenworth
- Colonel John F. Hamtramck
- Colonel Thomas Hunt
- Colonel Jacob Kingsbury
- Colonel George K. McGunnegle
- Colonel William Whistler
- Major David Ziegler
- Captain Meriwether Lewis
- First Lieutenant Tom Cotton
- Sergeant James Felder
- Black Jack (horse)
- Sergeant York (horse)

== Lineage ==
- Constituted 3 June 1784 in the Regular Army as the First American Regiment to consist of companies from Connecticut, New York, New Jersey, and Pennsylvania.
- Organized August–September 1784 in Pennsylvania and New Jersey (New York and Connecticut companies organized in 1785)
- Redesignated 29 September 1789 as the Regiment of Infantry
- Redesignated 3 March 1791 as the 1st Infantry Regiment
- Redesignated in 1792 as the Infantry of the 1st Sub-Legion
- Redesignated 31 October 1796 as the 1st Infantry Regiment
- Consolidated May–October 1815 with the 5th Infantry Regiment (constituted 12 April 1808), the 17th Infantry Regiment (constituted 11 January 1812), the 19th Infantry Regiment (constituted 26 June 1812), and the 28th Infantry Regiment (constituted 29 January 1813) to form the 3rd Infantry (The 17th and 19th Infantry Regiments had been consolidated with the 26th and 27th Infantry Regiments on 12 May 1814)
- Consolidated August–December 1869 with one-half of the 37th Infantry Regiment (see ANNEX) and consolidated unit designated as the 3rd Infantry
- 2nd and 3rd Battalions inactivated 18 November 1921 at Fort Snelling, Minnesota; activated 8 June 1922 at Fort Snelling, Minnesota
- Assigned 24 March 1923 to the 7th Division
- Relieved 15 August 1927 from assignment to the 7th Division and assigned to the 6th Division
- Relieved 1 October 1933 from assignment to the 6th Division and assigned to the 7th Division
- Relieved 16 October 1939 from assignment to the 7th Division and assigned to the 6th Division
- Relieved 10 May 1941 from assignment to the 6th Division
- (1st Battalion inactivated 1 June 1941 at Fort Leonard Wood, Missouri; activated 14 February 1942 in Newfoundland)
- (2nd Battalion (less Headquarters and Headquarters Company) inactivated 1 September 1942 at Fort Snelling, Minnesota (Headquarters and Headquarters Company concurrently inactivated in Greenland); battalion activated 22 October 1943 at Camp Butner, North Carolina)
- Inactivated 20 November 1946 in Germany
- Regiment (less 2nd Battalion) activated 6 April 1948 at Fort Myer, Virginia (2nd Battalion concurrently activated at Fort Lesley J. McNair, Washington, D.C.)
- Reorganized 1 July 1957 as a parent regiment under the Combat Arms Regimental System
- Withdrawn 16 January 1986 from the Combat Arms Regimental System and reorganized under the United States Army Regimental System
- Redesignated 1 October 2005 as the 3d Infantry Regiment

== Honors ==
=== Campaign participation credit ===
==== War of 1812 ====
1. Canada
2. Chippewa
3. Lundy's Lane

==== Mexican–American War ====
1. Palo Alto
2. Resaca de la Palma
3. Monterey
4. Vera Cruz
5. Cerro Gordo
6. Contreras
7. Churubusco
8. Chapultepec

==== American Civil War ====
1. Bull Run
2. Peninsula
3. Manassas
4. Antietam
5. Fredericksburg
6. Chancellorsville
7. Gettysburg
8. Appomattox
9. Texas 1861
10. Florida 1861
11. Florida 1862
12. Virginia 1863

==== Indian Wars ====
1. Miami (Ohio, 1791–1794)
2. Seminoles (Florida, 1840–1843)
3. New Mexico 1856
4. New Mexico 1857
5. New Mexico 1858
6. New Mexico 1860
7. Comanches (Oklahoma, 1868)
8. Montana 1887 (Nez Perce)
9. New Mexico 1860

==== Spanish–American War ====
1. Santiago

==== Philippine Insurrection ====
1. Malolos
2. San Isidro
3. Luzon 1899
4. Luzon 1900
5. Jolo 1911

One of the more active company grade officers was Captain James McCrae who, as Major General, commanded the 78th Division in the St. Mihiel and Meuse-Argonne offensives in World War I.

==== World War II ====
1. American Theater, Streamer without inscription;
2. Northern France

==== Vietnam ====
1. Counteroffensive, Phase II
2. Counteroffensive, Phase III
3. Tet Counteroffensive
4. Counteroffensive, Phase IV
5. Counteroffensive, Phase V
6. Counteroffensive, Phase VI
7. Tet 69/Counteroffensive
8. Summer-Fall 1969
9. Winter-Spring 1970
10. Sanctuary Counteroffensive
11. Counteroffensive, Phase VII
12. Consolidation I

==== War on terrorism ====
Iraq War

1. Iraqi Sovereignty

=== Decorations ===
- Presidential Unit Citation, 6–7 September 1968 (earned by Reconnaissance Platoon, Company E, 4th Battalion)
- Valorous Unit Award, Streamer embroidered SAIGON - LONG BINH (earned by 2d Battalion)
- Valorous Unit Award, Streamer embroidered KARBALA AND AN NAJAF, IRAQ (earned by 2d Battalion)
- Meritorious Unit Commendation (Army), Streamer embroidered WASHINGTON, D.C., 1969-1973 (earned by 1st Battalion)
- Meritorious Unit Commendation (Army), Streamer embroidered IRAQ 2003-2004 (earned by 2d Battalion)
- Meritorious Unit Commendation (Army), Streamer embroidered IRAQ 2006-2007 (earned by 2d Battalion)
- Meritorious Unit Commendation (Army), Streamer embroidered IRAQ 2009-2010 (earned by 2d Battalion)
- Meritorious Unit Commendation (Army), Streamer embroidered AFGHANISTAN 2011-2012 (earned by 2d Battalion)
- Army Superior Unit Award, Streamer embroidered 1984-1985 (earned by 1st Battalion)
- Army Superior Unit Award, Streamer embroidered 1993 (earned by 1st Battalion)
- Army Superior Unit Award, Streamer embroidered 2002-2003 (earned by 2d Battalion)
- Army Superior Unit Award, Streamer embroidered 2004-2005 (earned by 1st Battalion)
- Army Superior Unit Award, Streamer embroidered 2011-2013 (earned by 1st and 4th Battalions)
- Republic of Vietnam Gallantry Cross with Palm, 1968-1970 (earned by 2d and 4th Battalions)
- Republic of Vietnam Civil Actions Honor Medal, First Class, 1966-1970 (earned by 2d Battalion)

== In popular culture ==
Gardens of Stone is a 1987 American drama film directed by Francis Ford Coppola, based on the 1983 novel of the same title by Nicholas Proffitt. It stars James Caan, Anjelica Huston, James Earl Jones, Mary Stuart Masterson and D. B. Sweeney. The movie, set in 1968 and 1969, attempts to examine the meaning of the Vietnam War entirely through the eyes of the members of "The Old Guard", the stateside-based elite Army unit whose duties include Presidential escorts and military funerals at Arlington.

== See also ==
- List of United States Regular Army Civil War units

== Bibliography ==
- U.S. Army. "Regimental Home". (U.S. military website.) 3rd United States Infantry Regiment. Retrieved on 18 October 2009.
- First American Regiment at ArmyHistory.org. Accessed on 10 August 2008
- McKeeby, Eric M. (30 June 2004.) "MDW commander visits deployed Old Guard unit". (U.S. military website.) US Military District of Washington PAO. Retrieved on 4 October 2007.
- McKeeby, Eric M. (11 May 2004.) "U.S. Army Capt. Michael J. Trotter: Company commander juggles Old Guard's diverse missions in Africa". (U.S. military website.) Defend America. Retrieved on 4 October 2007.
- (22 May 1997.) "Lineage and honors information: 3rd Infantry (the Old Guard)". (U.S. military website.) United States Army Center of Military History. Retrieved on 4 October 2007.
- "Medal of Honor Citations". United States Army Center of Military History. Archived from the original on 1 November 2008.
- Eanes, Colonel Greg. (2013). "The Old Guard in the Philippine Insurrection". Retrieved on 8 February 2014
