= Old Guard Museum =

Coordinates: 38°52′54.5″N 77°04′51.0″W

The Old Guard Museum, located in Arlington's Fort Myer, is dedicated to the history of the 3rd U.S. Infantry Regiment (The Old Guard) with a special focus on their roles in times of national mourning. The museum collection includes uniforms from historic moments related to the Changing of the Guard at the Tomb of the Unknown Soldier and their collection of flags includes one from the Mexican–American War.

Their staff is sometimes also charged with interpreting other pieces of military history.

The Old Guard Museum closed to the public on September 30, 2008. The museum collection was consolidated with overall Army Museum Enterprise historical collection.
