= 1998 in the United States =

- Decades: 1970s; 1980s; 1990s; 2000s; 2010s
- See also: History of the United States (1991–2016); Timeline of United States history (1990–2009); List of years in the United States

Events from the year 1998 in the United States.

== Incumbents ==
=== Federal government ===
- President: Bill Clinton (D-Arkansas)
- Vice President: Al Gore (D-Tennessee)
- Chief Justice: William H. Rehnquist (Virginia)
- Speaker of the House of Representatives: Newt Gingrich (R-Georgia)
- Senate Majority Leader: Trent Lott (R-Mississippi)
- Congress: 105th

==== State governments ====
Governors and lieutenant governors

=== Governors ===
- Governor of Alabama: Fob James (Republican)
- Governor of Alaska: Tony Knowles (Democratic)
- Governor of Arizona: Jane Dee Hull (Republican)
- Governor of Arkansas: Mike Huckabee (Republican)
- Governor of California: Pete Wilson (Republican)
- Governor of Colorado: Roy Romer (Democratic)
- Governor of Connecticut: John G. Rowland (Republican)
- Governor of Delaware: Thomas R. Carper (Democratic)
- Governor of Florida: Lawton Chiles (Democratic) (until December 12), Buddy MacKay (Democratic) (starting December 12)
- Governor of Georgia: Zell Miller (Democratic)
- Governor of Hawaii: Ben Cayetano (Democratic)
- Governor of Idaho: Phil Batt (Republican)
- Governor of Illinois: Jim Edgar (Republican)
- Governor of Indiana: Frank O'Bannon (Democratic)
- Governor of Iowa: Terry E. Branstad (Republican)
- Governor of Kansas: Bill Graves (Republican)
- Governor of Kentucky: Paul E. Patton (Democratic)
- Governor of Louisiana: Murphy J. Foster Jr. (Republican)
- Governor of Maine: Angus King (Independent)
- Governor of Maryland: Parris N. Glendening (Democratic)
- Governor of Massachusetts: Paul Cellucci (Republican)
- Governor of Michigan: John Engler (Republican)
- Governor of Minnesota: Arne H. Carlson (Republican)
- Governor of Mississippi: Kirk Fordice (Republican)
- Governor of Missouri: Mel Carnahan (Democratic)
- Governor of Montana: Marc Racicot (Republican)
- Governor of Nebraska: Ben Nelson (Democratic)
- Governor of Nevada: Bob Miller (Democratic)
- Governor of New Hampshire: Jeanne Shaheen (Democratic)
- Governor of New Jersey: Christine Todd Whitman (Republican)
- Governor of New Mexico: Gary Johnson (Republican)
- Governor of New York: George Pataki (Republican)
- Governor of North Carolina: Jim Hunt (Democratic)
- Governor of North Dakota: Ed Schafer (Republican)
- Governor of Ohio: George Voinovich (Republican) (until December 31), Nancy Hollister (Republican) (starting December 31)
- Governor of Oklahoma: Frank Keating (Republican)
- Governor of Oregon: John Kitzhaber (Democratic)
- Governor of Pennsylvania: Tom Ridge (Republican)
- Governor of Rhode Island: Lincoln C. Almond (Republican)
- Governor of South Carolina: David Beasley (Republican)
- Governor of South Dakota: William J. Janklow (Republican)
- Governor of Tennessee: Don Sundquist (Republican)
- Governor of Texas: George W. Bush (Republican)
- Governor of Utah: Mike Leavitt (Republican)
- Governor of Vermont: Howard Dean (Democratic)
- Governor of Virginia: George Allen (Republican) (until January 17), Jim Gilmore (Republican) (starting January 17)
- Governor of Washington: Gary Locke (Democratic)
- Governor of West Virginia: Cecil H. Underwood (Republican)
- Governor of Wisconsin: Tommy Thompson (Republican)
- Governor of Wyoming: Jim Geringer (Republican)

=== Lieutenant governors ===
- Lieutenant Governor of Alabama: Don Siegelman (Democratic)
- Lieutenant Governor of Alaska: Fran Ulmer (Democratic)
- Lieutenant Governor of Arkansas: Winthrop Paul Rockefeller (Republican)
- Lieutenant Governor of California: Gray Davis (Democratic)
- Lieutenant Governor of Colorado: Gail Schoettler (Democratic)
- Lieutenant Governor of Connecticut: Jodi Rell (Republican)
- Lieutenant Governor of Delaware: Ruth Ann Minner (Democratic)
- Lieutenant Governor of Florida: Buddy MacKay (Democratic) (until December 12), vacant (starting December 12)
- Lieutenant Governor of Georgia: Pierre Howard (Democratic)
- Lieutenant Governor of Hawaii: Mazie Hirono (Democratic)
- Lieutenant Governor of Idaho: Butch Otter (Republican)
- Lieutenant Governor of Illinois: Bob Kustra (Republican) (until July 1), vacant (starting July 1)
- Lieutenant Governor of Indiana: Joe E. Kernan (Democratic)
- Lieutenant Governor of Iowa: Joy Corning (Republican)
- Lieutenant Governor of Kansas: Gary Sherrer (Republican)
- Lieutenant Governor of Kentucky: Steve Henry (Democratic)
- Lieutenant Governor of Louisiana: Kathleen Blanco (Democratic)
- Lieutenant Governor of Maryland: Kathleen Kennedy Townsend (Democratic)
- Lieutenant Governor of Massachusetts: Paul Cellucci (Republican)
- Lieutenant Governor of Michigan: Connie Binsfeld (Republican)
- Lieutenant Governor of Minnesota: Joanne E. Benson (Republican)
- Lieutenant Governor of Mississippi: Ronnie Musgrove (Democratic)
- Lieutenant Governor of Missouri: Roger B. Wilson (Democratic)
- Lieutenant Governor of Montana: Judy Martz (Republican)
- Lieutenant Governor of Nebraska: Kim Robak (Democratic)
- Lieutenant Governor of Nevada: Lonnie Hammargren (Republican)
- Lieutenant Governor of New Mexico: Walter Dwight Bradley (Republican)
- Lieutenant Governor of New York: Betsy McCaughey (Republican) (until December 31), vacant (starting December 31)
- Lieutenant Governor of North Carolina: Dennis A. Wicker (Democratic)
- Lieutenant Governor of North Dakota: Rosemarie Myrdal (Republican)
- Lieutenant Governor of Ohio: Nancy P. Hollister (Republican) (until December 31), vacant (starting December 31)
- Lieutenant Governor of Oklahoma: Mary Fallin (Republican)
- Lieutenant Governor of Pennsylvania: Mark S. Schweiker (Republican)
- Lieutenant Governor of Rhode Island: Bernard Jackvony (Republican)
- Lieutenant Governor of South Carolina: Bob Peeler (Republican)
- Lieutenant Governor of South Dakota: Carole Hillard (Republican)
- Lieutenant Governor of Tennessee: John S. Wilder (Democratic)
- Lieutenant Governor of Texas: Bob Bullock (Democratic)
- Lieutenant Governor of Utah: Olene S. Walker (Republican)
- Lieutenant Governor of Vermont: Doug Racine (Democratic)
- Lieutenant Governor of Virginia: Don Beyer (Democratic) (until January 17), John H. Hager (Republican) (starting January 17)
- Lieutenant Governor of Washington: Brad Owen (Democratic)
- Lieutenant Governor of Wisconsin: Scott McCallum (Republican)

== Events ==
=== January ===
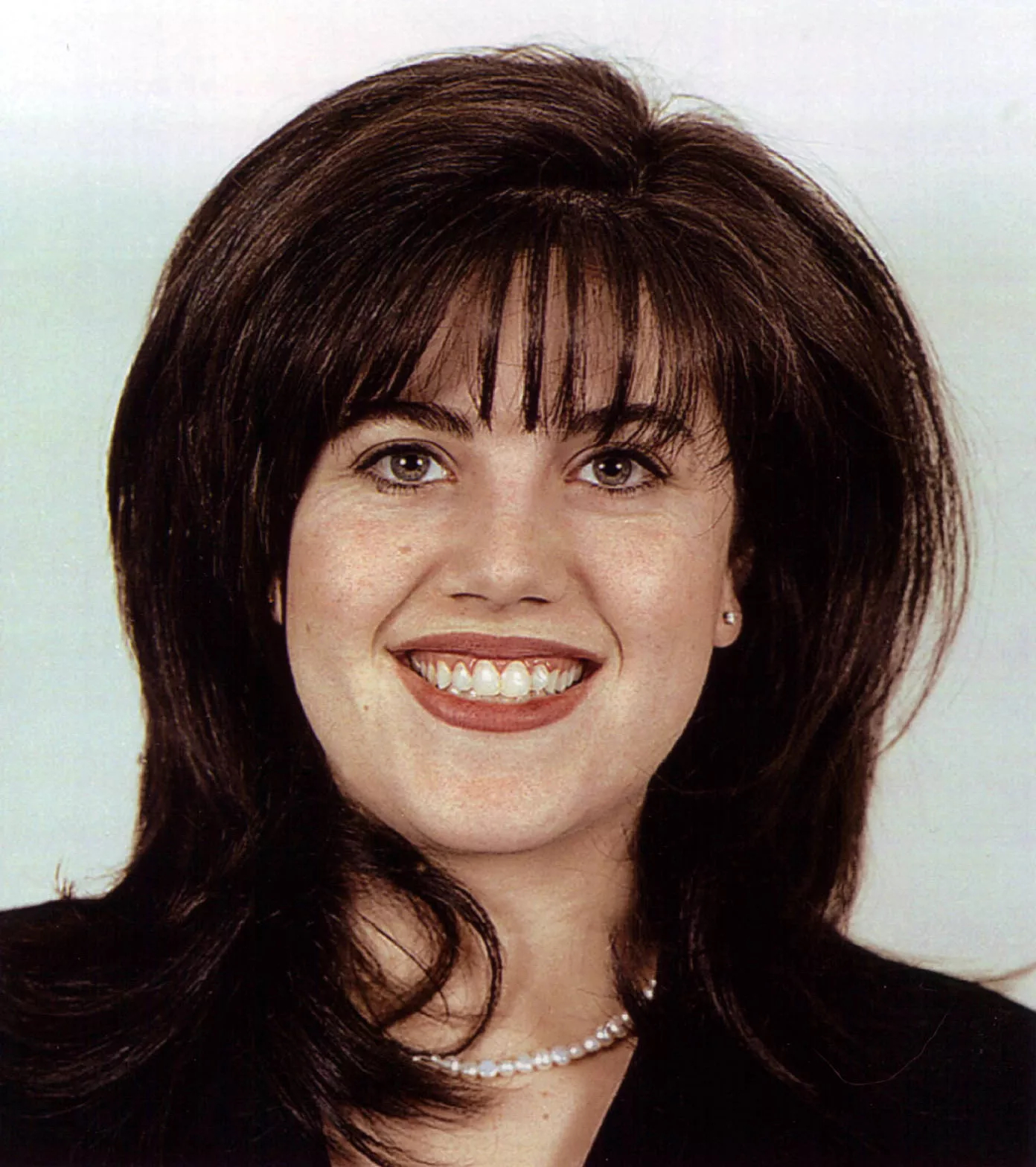
January 26: President Clinton becomes embroiled in the Lewinsky scandal

- January 1 – Smoking is banned in all California bars and restaurants.
- January 4–10 – A massive winter storm, partly caused by El Niño, strikes New England, southern Ontario, Quebec, and New Brunswick, resulting in widespread power failures, severe damage to forests, and numerous deaths.
- January 8 – Ramzi Yousef is sentenced to life in prison for planning the 1993 World Trade Center bombing.
- January 14 – Researchers in Dallas, Texas present findings about an enzyme that slows aging and cell death (apoptosis).
- January 15–18 – The Winter X Games take place in Crested Butte.
- January 17 – Paula Jones accuses U.S. President Bill Clinton of sexual harassment.
- January 23 – Mir Qazi is sentenced to death for a 1993 assault rifle attack outside CIA headquarters that killed two and wounded three.
- January 25 – Super Bowl XXXII: The Denver Broncos become the first AFC team in 14 years to win the Super Bowl, as they defeat the Green Bay Packers, 31–24.
- January 26
  - Clinton-Lewinsky scandal: On American television, President Bill Clinton denies he had "sexual relations" with former White House intern Monica Lewinsky.
  - Compaq buys Digital Equipment Corporation.
- January 27 – U.S. First Lady Hillary Clinton appears on The Today Show, calling the attacks against her husband part of a "vast right-wing conspiracy".
- January 28 – Ford Motor Company announces the buyout of Volvo Cars for $6.45 billion.
- January 29 – In Birmingham, Alabama, a bomb explodes at an abortion clinic, killing one and severely wounding another. Serial bomber Eric Rudolph is the prime suspect.

=== February ===
- February – Iraq disarmament crisis: The United States Senate passes Resolution 71, urging U.S. President Bill Clinton to "take all necessary and appropriate actions to respond to the threat posed by Iraq's refusal to end its weapons of mass destruction programs."
- February 3
  - Cavalese cable car disaster: a United States Military pilot causes the deaths of 20 people near Trento, Italy, when his low-flying plane severs the cable of a cable-car.
  - Karla Faye Tucker is executed in Texas, becoming the first woman executed in the United States since 1984 and the first to be executed in Texas since the American Civil War.
- February 6
  - Child rapist Mary Kay Letourneau is sent back to prison after violating a no-contact order and again raping her victim. Letourneau previously struck a plea deal to only serve six months for her crimes, but her breach of the contact order meant the full seven year five month sentence was restored.
  - Washington National Airport is renamed Ronald Reagan Washington National Airport.
- February 7–22 – The United States compete at the Winter Olympics in Nagano, Japan and win 6 gold, 3 silver, and 4 bronze medals.
- February 7 – Roger Nicholas Angleton commits suicide in a prison cell in Houston, Texas and admits to murdering socialite Doris Angleton in his suicide note.
- February 10 – Voters in Maine repeal a gay rights law passed in 1997, becoming the first U.S. state to abandon such a law.
- February 12 – The presidential line-item veto is declared unconstitutional by a United States federal judge.
- February 14 – The Department of Justice announces that Eric Robert Rudolph is a suspect in an Alabama abortion clinic bombing.
- February 15 – Dale Earnhardt wins the Daytona 500 on his 20th attempt.
- February 18 – Two white separatists are arrested in Nevada, accused of plotting biological warfare on New York City subways.
- February 19 – Larry Wayne Harris of the Aryan Nations and William Leavitt are arrested in Henderson, New York, for possession of military grade anthrax.
- February 20 – Iraq disarmament crisis: Iraqi President Saddam Hussein negotiates a deal with U.N. Secretary General Kofi Annan, allowing weapons inspectors to return to Baghdad, preventing military action by the United States and Britain.
- February 23 – Florida El Niño Outbreak: Tornadoes in central Florida destroy or damage 2,600 structures and kill 42.
- February 26 – Oprah Winfrey is cleared of slander in an Amarillo court after a highly publicized court battle with Texas beef moguls.

=== March ===
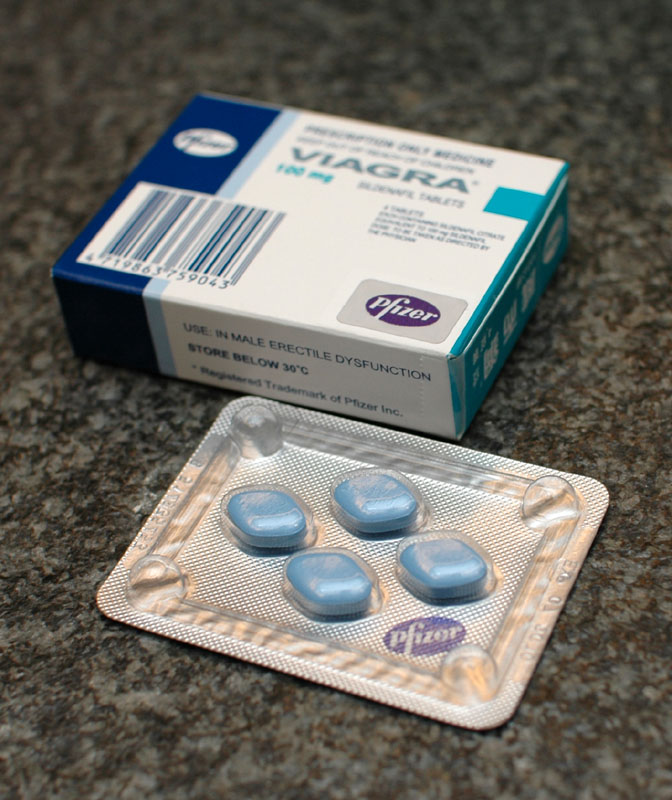
March 27: FDA approves Viagra for erectile dysfunction

- March 4 – Gay rights: Oncale v. Sundowner Offshore Services: The Supreme Court of the United States rules that federal laws banning on-the-job sexual harassment also apply when both parties are the same sex.
- March 5
  - NASA announces that the Clementine probe orbiting the Moon has found enough water in polar craters to support a human colony and rocket fueling station.
  - NASA announces the choice of United States Air Force Lt. Col. Eileen Collins as commander of a future Space Shuttle Columbia mission to launch an X-ray telescope, making Collins the first woman to command a Space Shuttle mission.
- March 7 – The Imperial Wizard of the Ku Klux Klan is fined for burning a cross in his garden and infringing air regulations in California.
- March 10 – United States troops stationed in the Persian Gulf begin to receive the first anthrax vaccine.
- March 23 – The 70th Academy Awards, hosted by Billy Crystal, are held at Shrine Auditorium in Los Angeles. James Cameron's Titanic wins a record-tying 11 awards (tied with 1959's Ben-Hur) and leads with a record-tying 14 nominations (tied with 1950's All About Eve), including Best Picture and Best Director. The telecast is the most-watched Oscars broadcast in history, garnering over 57.2 million viewers.
- March 24 – Students Mitchell Johnson and Andrew Golden open fire on classmates during a fire drill, killing five and injuring 10 at Westside Middle School in Jonesboro, Arkansas.
- March 27 – The Food and Drug Administration approves Viagra for use as a treatment for erectile dysfunction, the first pill to be approved for this condition in the United States.
- March 29
  - A series of three tornadoes in southern Minnesota kill three people.
  - The World Wrestling Federation holds WrestleMania XIV from the FleetCenter in Boston, Massachusetts.
- March 30 – Serial killer Judy Buenoano is executed by electric chair in Florida, the first woman to be executed in the state since 1848.

=== April ===
- April – The unemployment rate drops to 4.3%, the lowest level since February 1970.
- April 6
  - The Dow Jones Industrial Average closes above 9,000 for the first time, and ending a gain of 49.82 points, 9,033.23.
  - Long running British children's television series Teletubbies begins its U.S. television debut on PTV.
- April 7 – Citicorp and Travelers Group announce plans to merge, creating the largest financial-services conglomerate in the world, Citigroup.
- April 8 – April 1998 Birmingham tornado: An F5 tornado strikes the western portion of the Birmingham, Alabama area, killing 32 people.
- April 16 – An F3 tornado passes through downtown Nashville, Tennessee, the first significant tornado in 11 years to directly hit a major city. An F5 tornado travels through rural portions south of Nashville (see 1998 Nashville tornado outbreak).
- April 18 – Toon Disney – devoted to carrying animated series and movies, 24 hours a day, is launched by The Walt Disney Company.
- April 22 – The Disney's Animal Kingdom theme park at Walt Disney World opens to the public for the first time.
- April 27 – The Aladdin Hotel & Casino in Las Vegas is imploded to make way for the brand new Aladdin Hotel & Casino.
- April 30 – Daniel V. Jones, a cancer and HIV-positive patient, commits suicide on a Los Angeles freeway after a police standoff. The event was broadcast live on television and caused controversy about airing police chases.

=== May ===
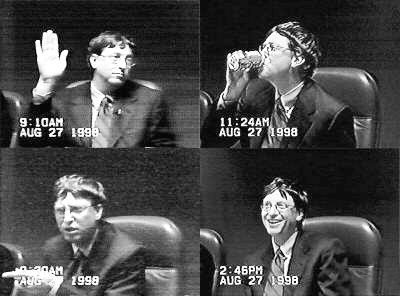
May 18: United States v. Microsoft antitrust suit (Bill Gates pictured in his August deposition)

- May 13 – India carries out two more nuclear tests at Pokhran. The United States and Japan impose economic sanctions on India.
- May 14 – Seinfeld airs its series finale to 76 million viewers.
- May 18 – United States v. Microsoft: The United States Department of Justice and 20 U.S. states file an antitrust case against Microsoft.
- May 21
  - At Thurston High School in Springfield, Oregon, Kipland Kinkel (who was suspended for bringing a gun to school) shoots a semi-automatic rifle into a room filled with students, killing two and wounding 25 others, after killing his parents at home.
  - In Miami, Florida, five abortion clinics are hit by a butyric acid attacker.
- May 22 – Lewinsky scandal: A federal judge rules that United States Secret Service agents can be compelled to testify before a grand jury concerning the scandal.
- May 27 – Oklahoma City bombing: Michael Fortier is sentenced to 12 years in prison and fined $75,000 for failing to warn authorities about the terrorist plot.
- May 28
  - Nuclear testing: In response to a series of Indian nuclear tests, Pakistan explodes five nuclear devices of its own in the Chaghai hills of Baluchistan, prompting the United States, Japan and other nations to impose economic sanctions.
  - Saturday Night Live star Phil Hartman is murdered by his wife in their home, who then killed herself when police arrived.

=== June ===
- June 2 – California voters approve Proposition 227, abolishing the state's bilingual education program.
- June 4 – Terry Nichols is sentenced to life in prison for his role in the Oklahoma City bombing.
- June 5 – A strike begins at the General Motors Corporation parts factory in Flint, Michigan, quickly spreading to five other assembly plants and lasting seven weeks.
- June 7 – Three white supremacists murder James Byrd Jr. in Jasper, Texas.
- June 12
  - A jury in Hattiesburg, Mississippi, convicts 17-year-old Luke Woodham of killing two students and wounding seven others at Pearl High School.
  - Christina Marie Williams, 13, is kidnapped in Seaside, California while walking her dog.
- June 14 – The Chicago Bulls win their 6th NBA title in 8 years when they beat the Utah Jazz, 87–86 in Game 6. This is also Michael Jordan's last game as a Bull, clinching the game in the final seconds on a fadeaway jumper.
- June 16
  - The American Film Institute broadcasts their list of the 100 best American movies as the first entry in their AFI 100 Years... series. Citizen Kane is deemed as the best film of all time, with Casablanca, The Godfather, Gone with the Wind, and Lawrence of Arabia listed in the top five.
  - The Detroit Red Wings sweep the Washington Capitals in four games in the 1998 Stanley Cup Finals.
- June 19 – Walt Disney Pictures' 36th feature film, Mulan, is released to very positive reception and commercial success.
- June 25
  - In the case of Clinton v. City of New York, 524 U.S. 417 (1998), the Supreme Court of the United States holds that the Line Item Veto Act is unconstitutional.
  - Microsoft releases Windows 98 (First Edition).
- June 28 – The World Wrestling Federation holds its King of the Ring pay-per-view event at the Civic Arena in Pittsburgh, Pennsylvania. The Undertaker throws Mankind off the Hell in a Cell structure, causing him to plummet sixteen feet through an announcers' table.

=== July ===
- July 5 – Japan launches a probe to Mars, joining the United States and Russia as an outer space-exploring nation.
- July 10
  - The DNA-identified remains of United States Air Force 1st Lt. Michael Joseph Blassie arrive home to his family in St. Louis, Missouri, after being in the Tomb of the Unknowns since 1984.
  - Catholic priests' sex abuse scandal: The Diocese of Dallas agrees to pay $23.4 million to nine former altar boys who claimed they were sexually abused by former priest Rudolph Kos.
- July 24
  - 1998 United States Capitol shooting incident: Russell Eugene Weston Jr. bursts into the United States Capitol and opens fire, killing two United States Capitol Police officers. He is later ruled incompetent to stand trial.
  - Saving Private Ryan premieres in movie theaters.
- July 25 – The United States Navy commissions the aircraft carrier USS Harry S. Truman and puts her into service.
- July 28 – Monica Lewinsky scandal: Ex-White House intern Monica Lewinsky receives transactional immunity, in exchange for her grand jury testimony concerning her relationship with U.S. President Bill Clinton.

=== August ===
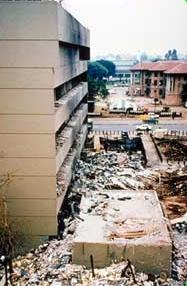
August 7: U.S. embassy bombings in Tanzania and Kenya

- August 7 – 1998 U.S. embassy bombings: The bombings of the United States embassies in Dar es Salaam, Tanzania, and Nairobi, Kenya kill 224 people and injure over 4,500; they are linked to terrorist Osama bin Laden, an exile of Saudi Arabia.
- August 14 – Gary C. Evans, infamous in New York's Capital Region for killing five people, escapes police custody and kills himself by jumping off a bridge.
- August 17 – Monica Lewinsky scandal: U.S. President Bill Clinton admits in taped testimony that he had an "improper physical relationship" with White House intern Monica Lewinsky. He also admits before the nation that night in a nationally televised address that he "misled people" about his sexual affair with Lewinsky.
- August 20 – 1998 U.S. embassy bombings: The United States military launches cruise missile attacks against alleged al-Qaeda camps in Afghanistan and a suspected chemical plant in Sudan in retaliation for the August 7 bombings of American embassies in Kenya and Tanzania. The al-Shifa pharmaceutical factory in Khartoum is destroyed in the attack.
- August 26 – Iraq disarmament crisis: Scott Ritter resigns from UNSCOM, sharply criticizing the Clinton administration and the U.N. Security Council for not being vigorous enough about insisting that Iraq's weapons of mass destruction be destroyed. Ritter tells reporters that "Iraq is not disarming," "Iraq retains the capability to launch a chemical strike."
- August 30 – The World Wrestling Federation holds its SummerSlam event from Madison Square Garden in New York City, New York.

=== September ===
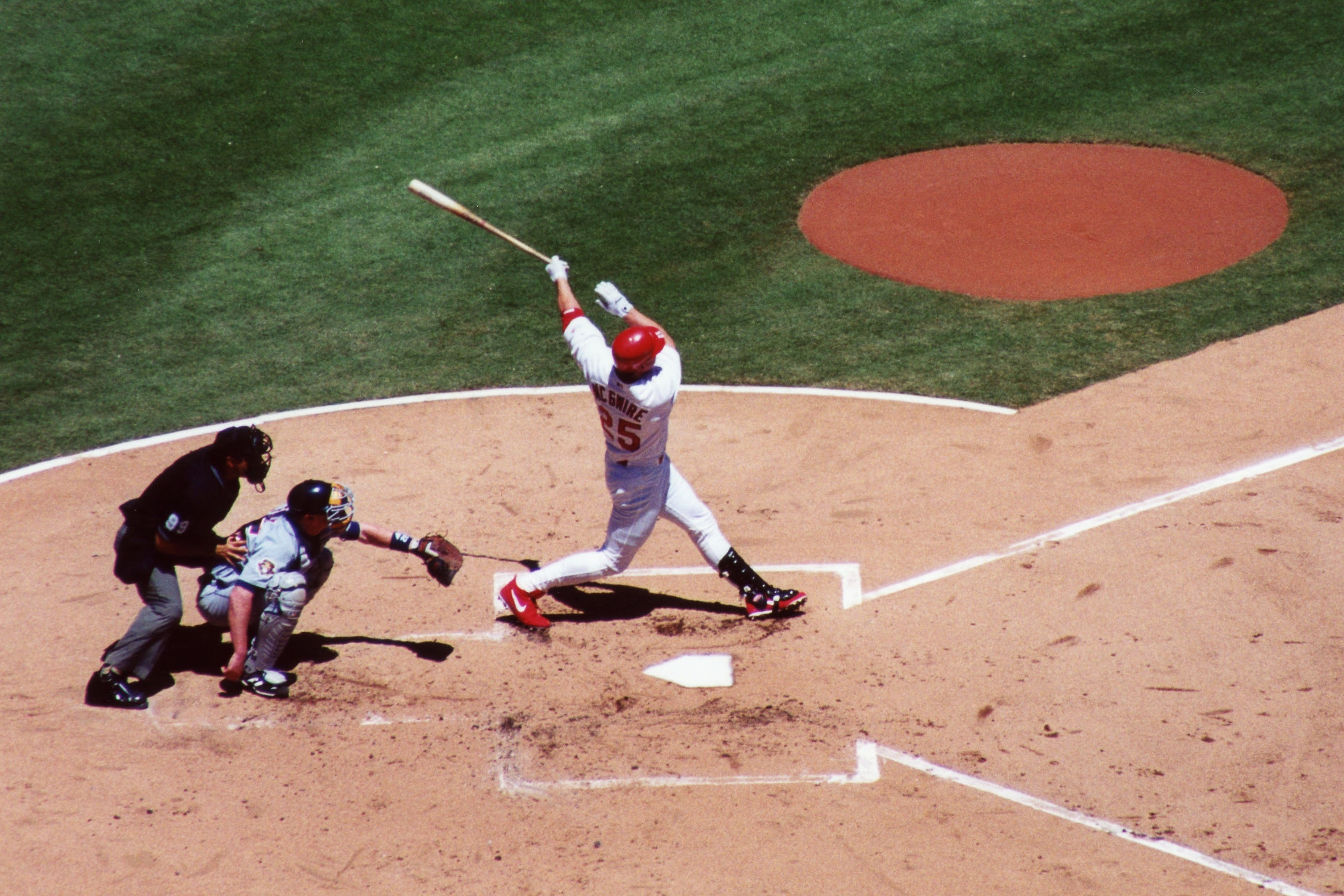
September 8: Mark McGwire breaks the single-season home run record

- September 2 – A McDonnell Douglas MD-11 airliner (Swissair Flight 111) crashes near Peggys Cove, Nova Scotia, after taking off from New York City en route to Geneva; all 229 people on board are killed.
- September 4 – Google, Inc. is founded in Menlo Park, California, by Stanford University Ph.D. candidates Larry Page and Sergey Brin.
- September 8 – St. Louis Cardinals first baseman Mark McGwire breaks baseball's single-season home run record, formerly held since 1961 by Roger Maris. McGwire hits #62 at Busch Stadium in the 4th inning off of Chicago Cubs pitcher Steve Trachsel.
- September 9 – Serial killer Dana Sue Gray pleads guilty to two counts of murder and one count of attempted murder in California. She is also believed to have murdered a third victim.
- September 11 – Documents relating to Project FUBELT are declassified by the National Security Archive, outlining secret CIA operations to promote a military coup against Chilean president Salvador Allende after he won the 1970 election.
- September 20 – Raymond James Stadium in Tampa, Florida opens.
- September 25–28 – Major creditors of Long-Term Capital Management, a Greenwich, Connecticut-based hedge fund, after days of tough bargaining and some informal mediation by Federal Reserve officials, agree on terms of a re-capitalization.
- September 29 – Iraq disarmament crisis: The U.S. Congress passes the Iraq Liberation Act, which states that the United States wants to remove Saddam Hussein from power and replace the government with a democratic institution.

=== October ===
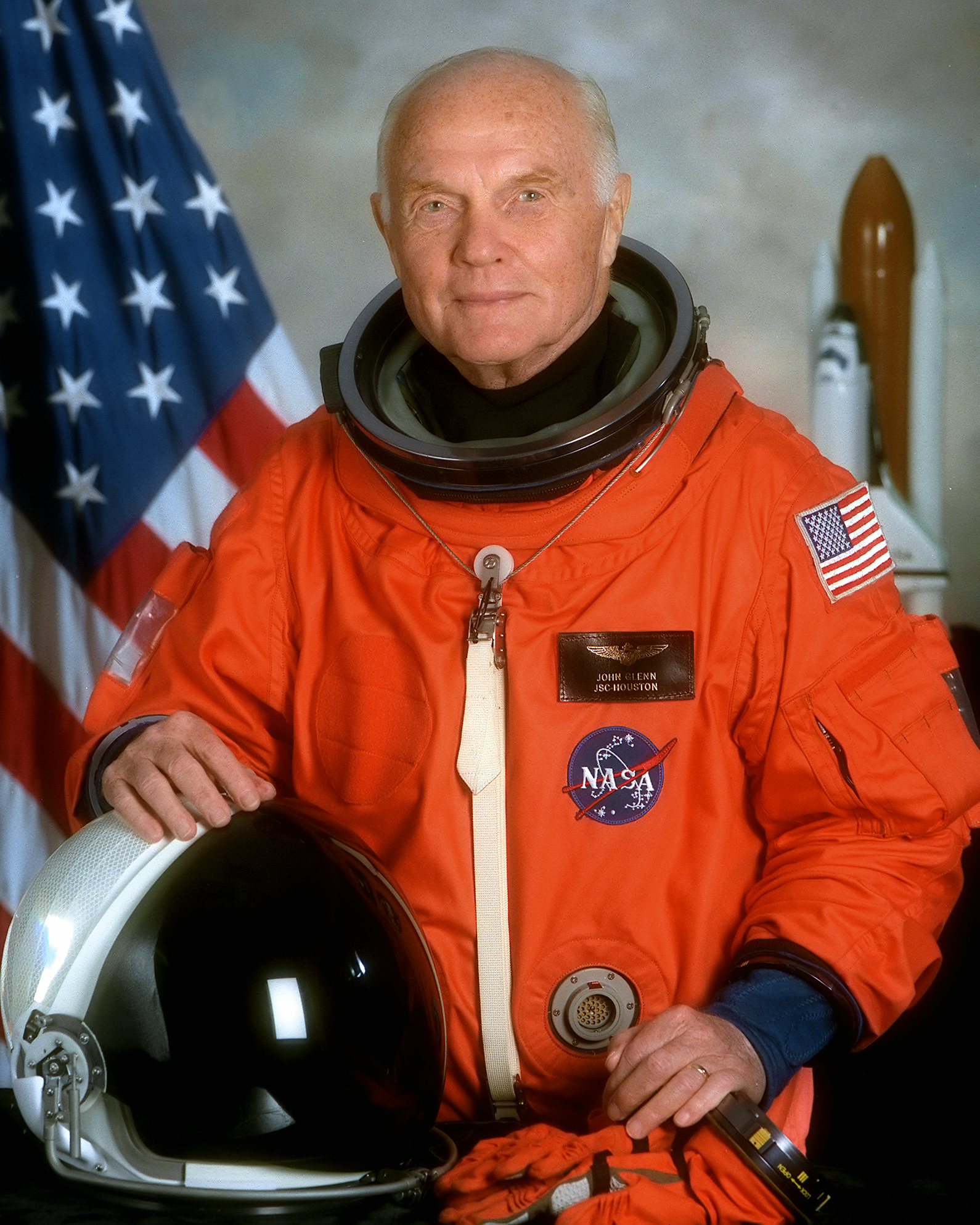
October 29: John Glenn returns to space

- October 4 – Leafie Mason is murdered in her Hughes Springs, Texas house by Angel Maturino Resendiz. She is his second victim in his second incident.
- October 6 – College student Matthew Shepard is found tied to a fence near Laramie, Wyoming. He dies six days later from his wounds. It is found later that Shepard personally knew his killer and that the killer was on a meth rage when the incident happened. Shepard had also had gay sex with him in the past.
- October 7 – The United States Congress passes the Sonny Bono Copyright Term Extension Act, which gives copyright holders 20 more years of copyright privilege on work they control. This effectively freezes the public domain to works created before 1923 in the United States.
- October 12 – The Congress of the United States passes the Digital Millennium Copyright Act.
- October 14 – Eric Robert Rudolph is charged with six bombings (including the 1996 Olympic bombing) in Atlanta, Georgia.
- October 15
  - American Airlines becomes the first airline to offer electronic ticketing in all 44 countries it serves.
  - The Bellagio Hotel & Casino in Las Vegas opens on the former grounds of the Dunes Hotel.
- October 17–18 – Severe flooding takes place in south central Texas.
- October 21 – The New York Yankees defeat the San Diego Padres to sweep them in the World Series. The Yankees finish with 114 regular-season wins and 11 postseason victories (125 total – the most by any team in 123 years of Major League baseball).
- October 29
  - STS-95: The Space Shuttle Discovery blasts off with 77-year-old John Glenn on board, making him the oldest person to go into space. (He became the first American to orbit the Earth on February 20, 1962.)
  - In Freehold Borough, New Jersey, Melissa Drexler pleads guilty to aggravated manslaughter for killing her baby moments after delivering him in the bathroom at her senior prom, and is sentenced to 15 years imprisonment.

=== November ===
- November 3 – Jesse Ventura, former professional wrestler, is elected Governor of Minnesota.
- November 5
  - Lewinsky scandal: As part of the impeachment inquiry, House Judiciary Committee chairman Henry Hyde sends a list of 81 questions to U.S. President Bill Clinton.
  - The journal Nature publishes a genetic study showing compelling evidence that Thomas Jefferson fathered his slave Sally Hemings' son Eston Hemings Jefferson.
- November 7 – John Glenn returns to Earth aboard the Space Shuttle Discovery.
- November 9 – In the largest civil settlement in United States history, a federal judge approves a US$1.03 billion settlement requiring dozens of brokerage houses (including Merrill Lynch, Goldman Sachs, and Salomon Smith Barney) to pay investors who claim they were cheated in a widespread price-fixing scheme on the NASDAQ.
- November 12 – Daimler-Benz completes a merger with Chrysler Corporation to form Daimler-Chrysler.
- November 13–14 – Iraq disarmament crisis: U.S. President Bill Clinton orders airstrikes on Iraq, then calls them off at the last minute when Iraq promises once again to "unconditionally" cooperate with UNSCOM.
- November 19 – Lewinsky scandal: The United States House of Representatives' Judiciary Committee begins impeachment hearings against U.S. President Bill Clinton.
- November 20
  - A court in Taliban-controlled Afghanistan declares accused terrorist Osama bin Laden "a man without a sin" in regard to the 1998 U.S. embassy bombings in Kenya and Tanzania.
  - Nickelodeon's The Rugrats Movie, based on the cartoon series of the same name is released in theaters.
- November 25
  - Pixar's second feature film, A Bug's Life, is released in theaters.
- November 24 – America Online announces it will acquire Netscape Communications in a stock-for-stock transaction worth US$4.2 billion.
- November 30 – Deutsche Bank announces a US$10 billion deal to buy Bankers Trust, thus creating the largest financial institution in the world.

=== December ===
- December – Grade school children in Aurora, Colorado, collect $35,000 to purchase and free enslaved children in Sudan.
- December 1 – Exxon announces a US$73.7 billion deal to buy Mobil, thus creating Exxon-Mobil, the second-largest company on the planet by revenue.
- December 5 – D.C. United defeats Vasco da Gama 2–1 on aggregate to win the Interamerican Cup (one of the greatest triumphs in the history of U.S. club soccer).
- December 16–19 – Iraq disarmament crisis: U.S. President Bill Clinton orders American and British airstrikes on Iraq. UNSCOM withdraws all weapons inspectors from Iraq.
- December 17 – Claudia Benton, of West University Place, Texas, is murdered in her house by Angel Maturino Resendiz (his third victim in his third incident).
- December 18 – DreamWorks' second film, The Prince of Egypt, is released in theaters. An epic and ambitious take on the Book of Exodus, it receives generally positive reviews and becomes a modest box office success. Over time, the film grows in esteem to the point that many now consider it the best DreamWorks film and one of the best animated films ever made.
- December 19 – Lewinsky scandal: President Bill Clinton is impeached by the United States House of Representatives. (He was later acquitted.)
- December 21 – Iraq disarmament crisis: UN Security Council members France, Germany and Russia call for sanctions to end against Iraq. The 3 Security Council members also call for UNSCOM to either be disbanded or for its role to be recast. The U.S. says it will veto any such proposal.
- December 26 – Iraq disarmament crisis: Iraq announces its intention to fire upon U.S. and British warplanes that patrol the northern and southern "no-fly zones".

=== Ongoing ===
- Iraqi no-fly zones (1991–2003)
- Dot-com bubble (c. 1995–c. 2000)

== Sports ==
- January 25 – Super Bowl XXXII: The Denver Broncos become the first AFC team in 14 years to win the Super Bowl, as they defeat the Green Bay Packers, 31–24.
- February 15 – Dale Earnhardt wins the Daytona 500 on his 20th attempt.
- June 14 – The Chicago Bulls win their 6th NBA title in 8 years when they beat the Utah Jazz, 87–86 in Game 6. This is also Michael Jordan's last game as a Bull, clinching the game in the final seconds on a fadeaway jumper.
- June 16 – The Detroit Red Wings sweep the Washington Capitals in four games in the 1998 Stanley Cup Finals.
- September 20 – Raymond James Stadium in Tampa, Florida opens.
- October 21 – The New York Yankees defeat the San Diego Padres to sweep them in the World Series. The Yankees finish with 114 regular-season wins and 11 postseason victories (125 total – the most by any team in 123 years of Major League baseball).
- November 3 – Jesse Ventura, former professional wrestler, is elected Governor of Minnesota.

== Births ==
=== January ===
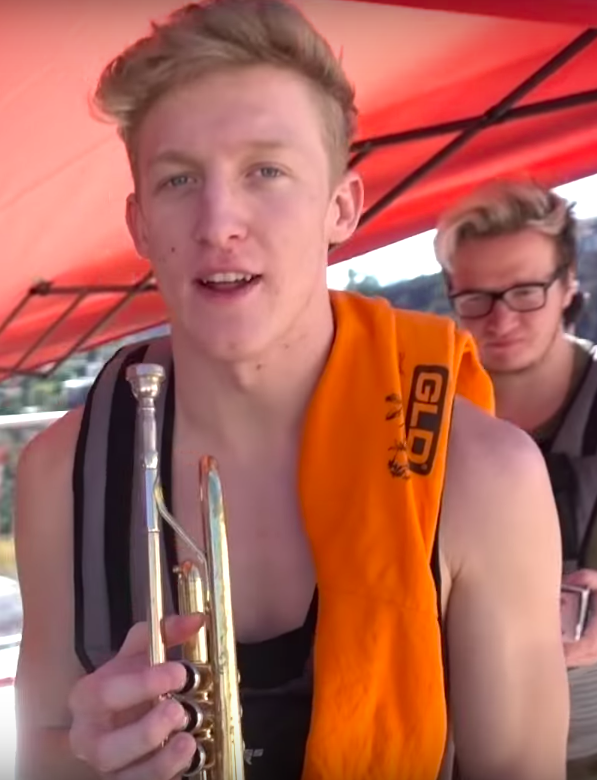
Tfue

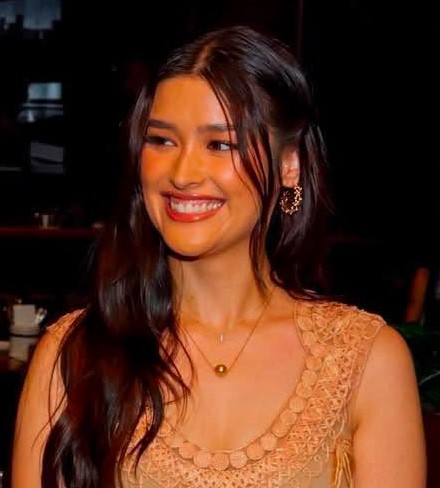
Liza Soberano

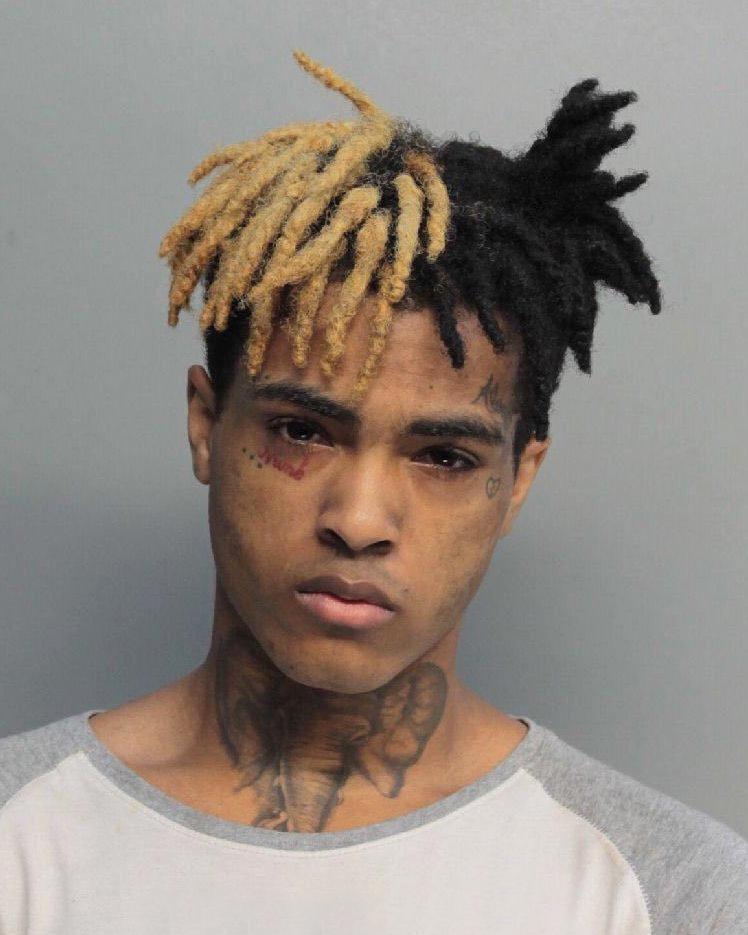
XXXTentacion

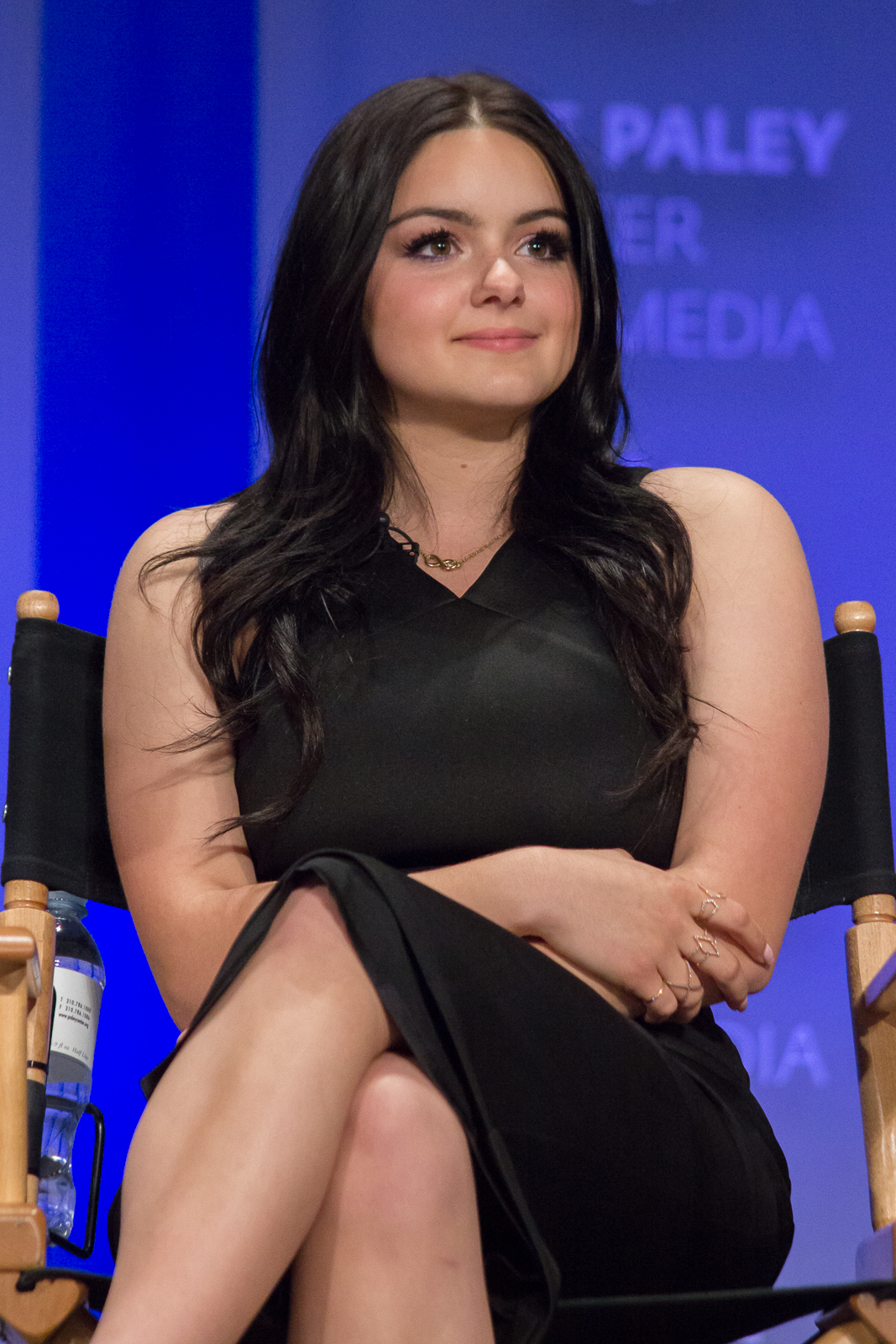
Ariel Winter

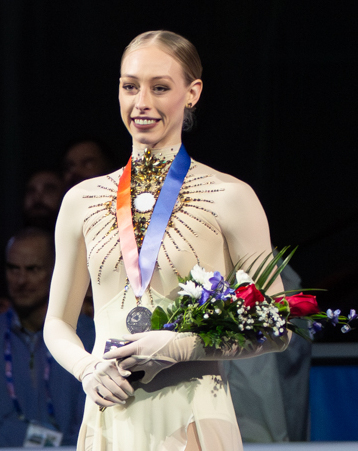
Bradie Tennell

- January 1 – Samuel Kwong, fencer
- January 2 – Tfue, YouTuber
- January 3 – Emiru, YouTuber
- January 4
  - Coco Jones, actress, singer, rapper, and dancer
  - Liza Soberano, model and actress
- January 6 – Norman Grimes, sprinter
- January 8 – DiJonai Carrington, basketball player
- January 9 – Kerris Dorsey, actress and singer
- January 10 – Michael Mmoh, tennis player
- January 12 – Nathan Gamble, actor
- January 13 – Kamron Doyle, bowler
- January 16 – Dion Lennox, wrestler
- January 21 – Amelia Hundley, artistic gymnast
- January 22 – Silentó, rapper
- January 23
  - Rachel Crow, singer and actress
  - Cole Custer, stock car racing driver
  - XXXTentacion, rapper and singer/songwriter (d. 2018)
- January 24 – Jay Versace, record producer and former internet personality
- January 26 – Leeah D. Jackson, actress
- January 27 – Devin Druid, actor
- January 28 – Ariel Winter, actress
- January 31 – Bradie Tennell, figure skater

=== February ===
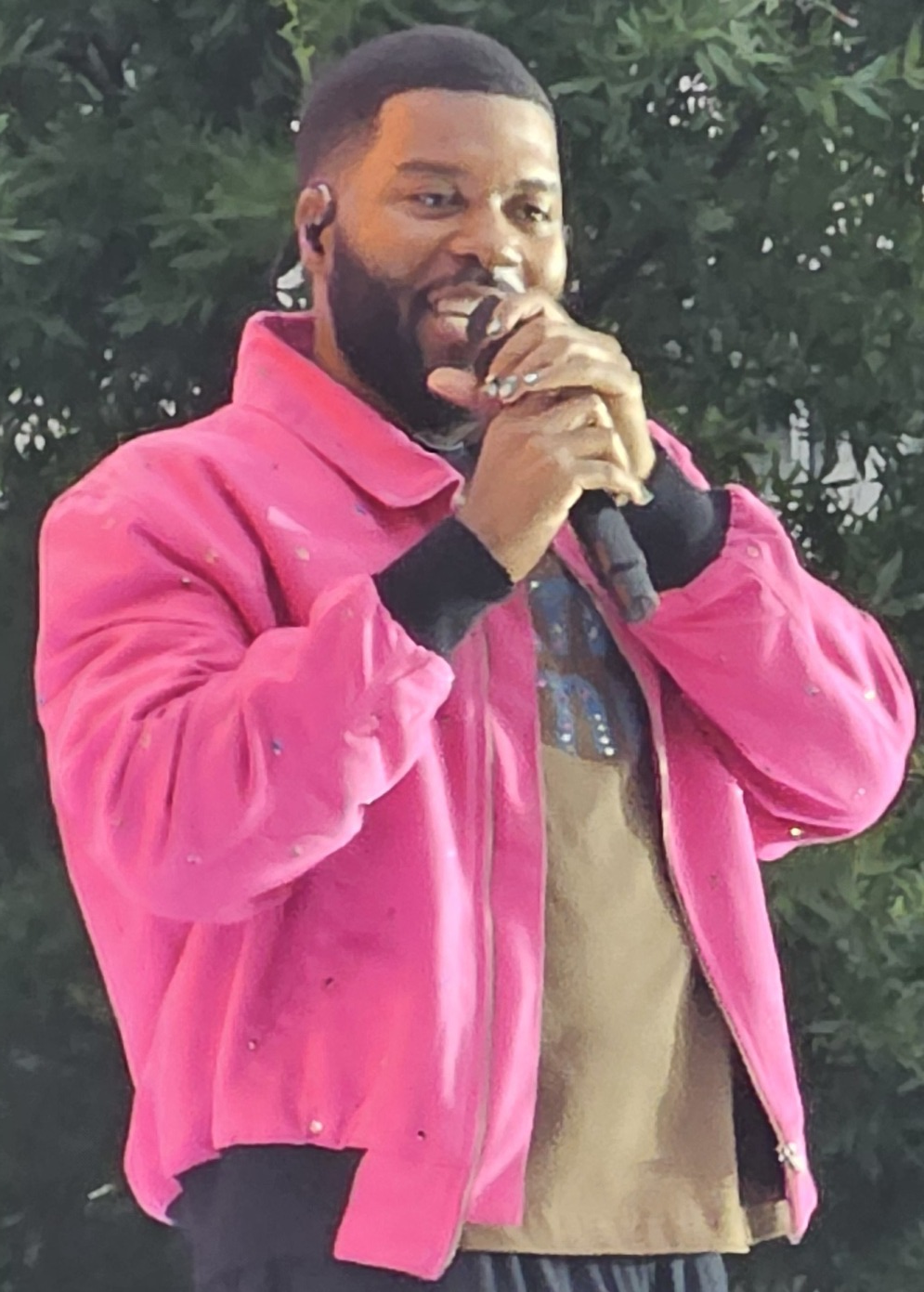
Khalid

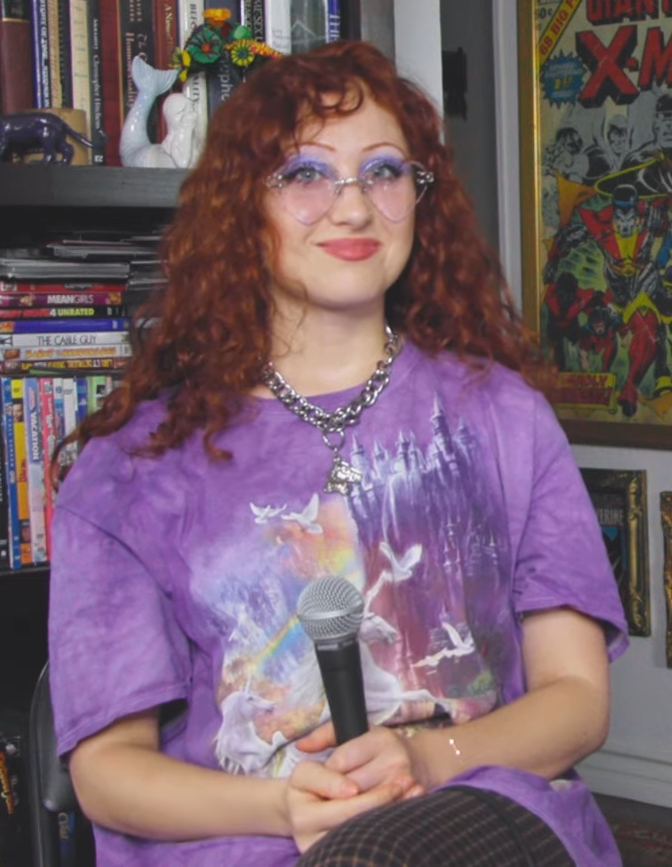
Chappell Roan

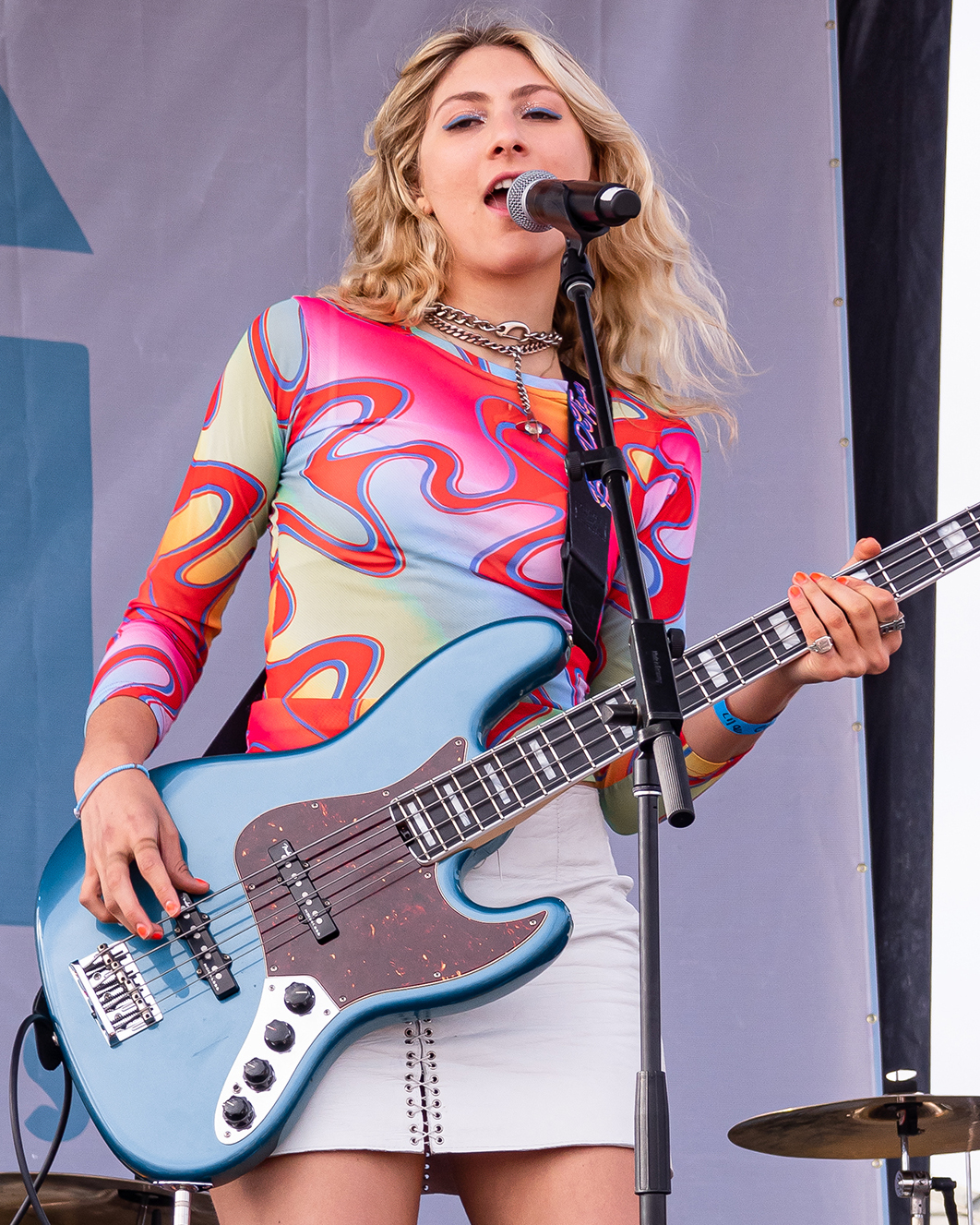
Blu DeTiger

- February 1 – Stefan Kozlov, tennis player
- February 4 – Malik Monk, basketball player
- February 6 – Adley Rutschman, baseball player
- February 11
  - Khalid, singer
  - Josh Jacobs, football player
  - Ryan Lindgren, ice hockey player
- February 12 – River Radamus, Olympic Alpine ski racer
- February 15 – Zachary Gordon, actor
- February 17 – Devin White, football player
- February 18 – Matthew Davidson, guitarist and singer
- February 19 – Chappell Roan, singer
- February 20 – Corbin, singer
- February 22 – Blu DeTiger, singer
- February 26
  - Yetur Gross-Matos, football player
  - Jeremy Chinn, football player

=== March ===
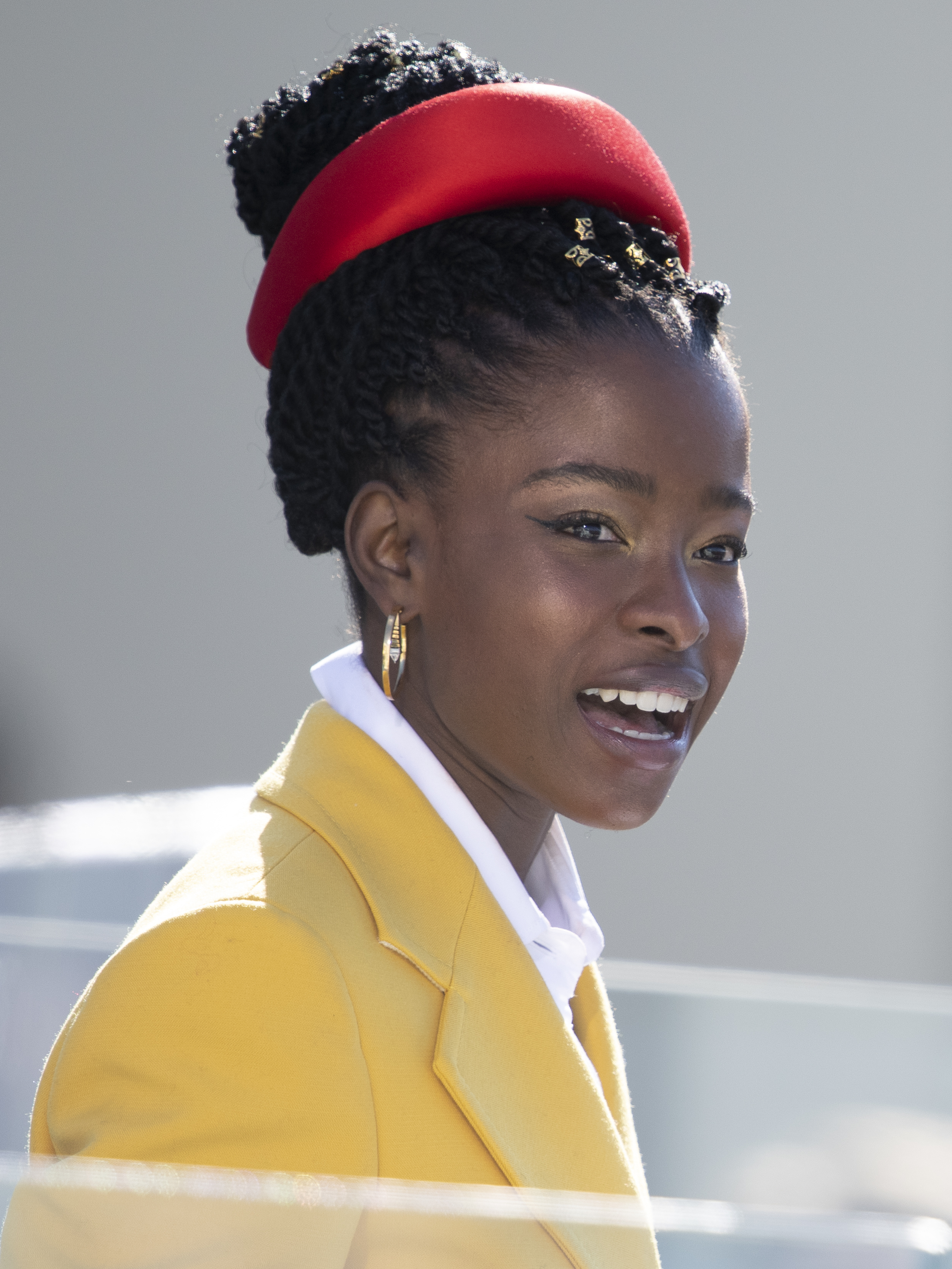
Amanda Gorman

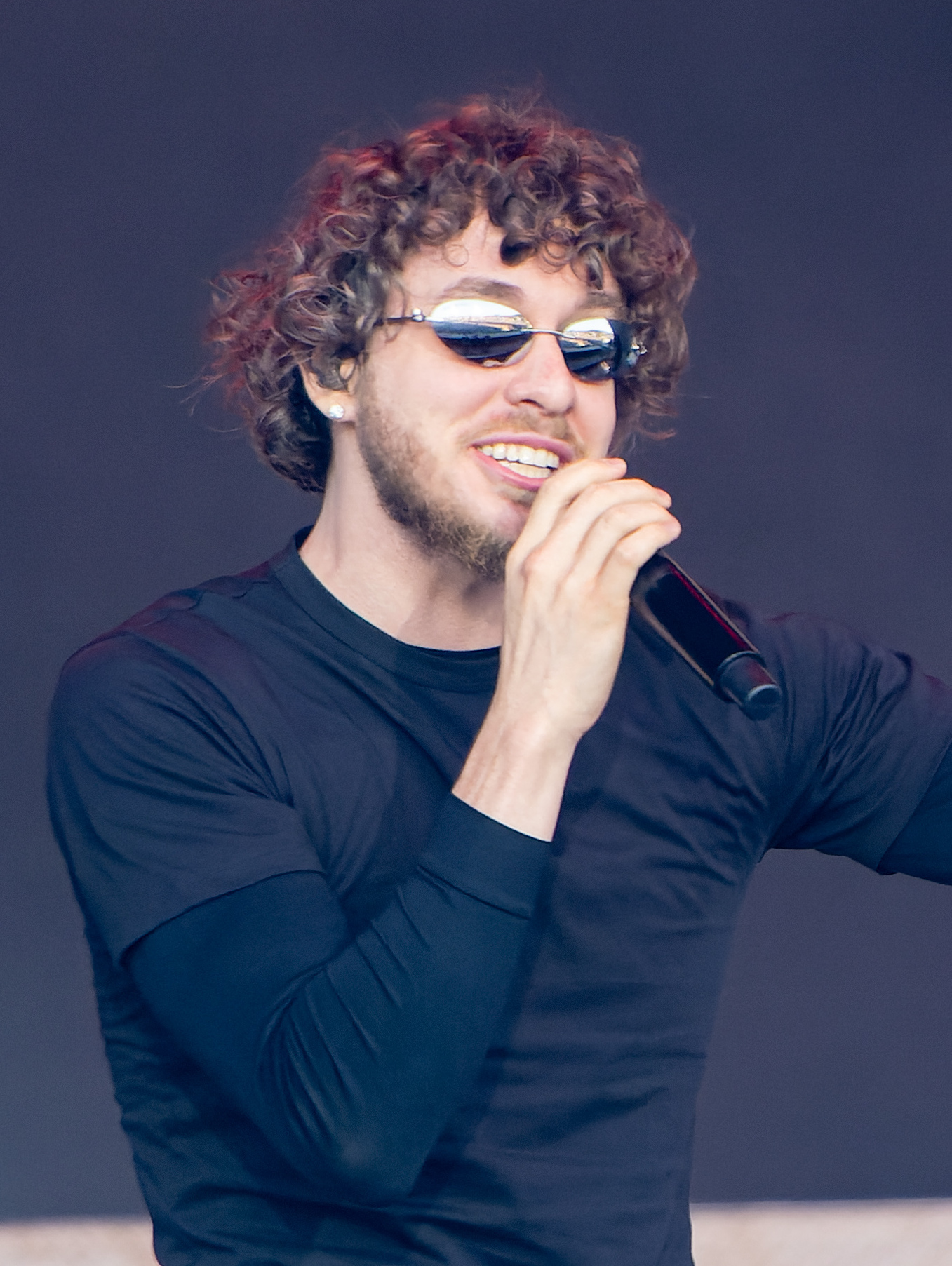
Jack Harlow

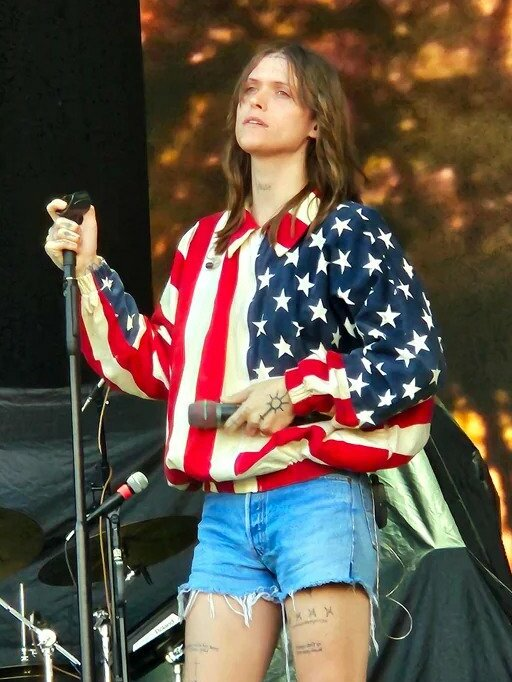
Ethel Cain

- March 2 – Tua Tagovailoa, football player
- March 4 – Obi Toppin, basketball player
- March 5 – Micah Fowler, actor
- March 7 – Amanda Gorman, poet and activist
- March 9
  - Parker Boudreaux, wrestler
  - Najee Harris, football player
- March 10 – Justin Herbert, football player
- March 13 – Jack Harlow, rapper
- March 17 – Sam Denby, YouTuber and podcaster
- March 21 – Miles Bridges, basketball player
- March 24
  - Ethel Cain, singer
  - Damar Hamlin, football player
- March 25 – Ryan Simpkins, actress
- March 27 – Shady Elnahas, wrestler and retired judoka
- March 29 – Shealeigh, singer/songwriter
- March 31 – Jakob Chychrun, ice hockey player

=== April ===
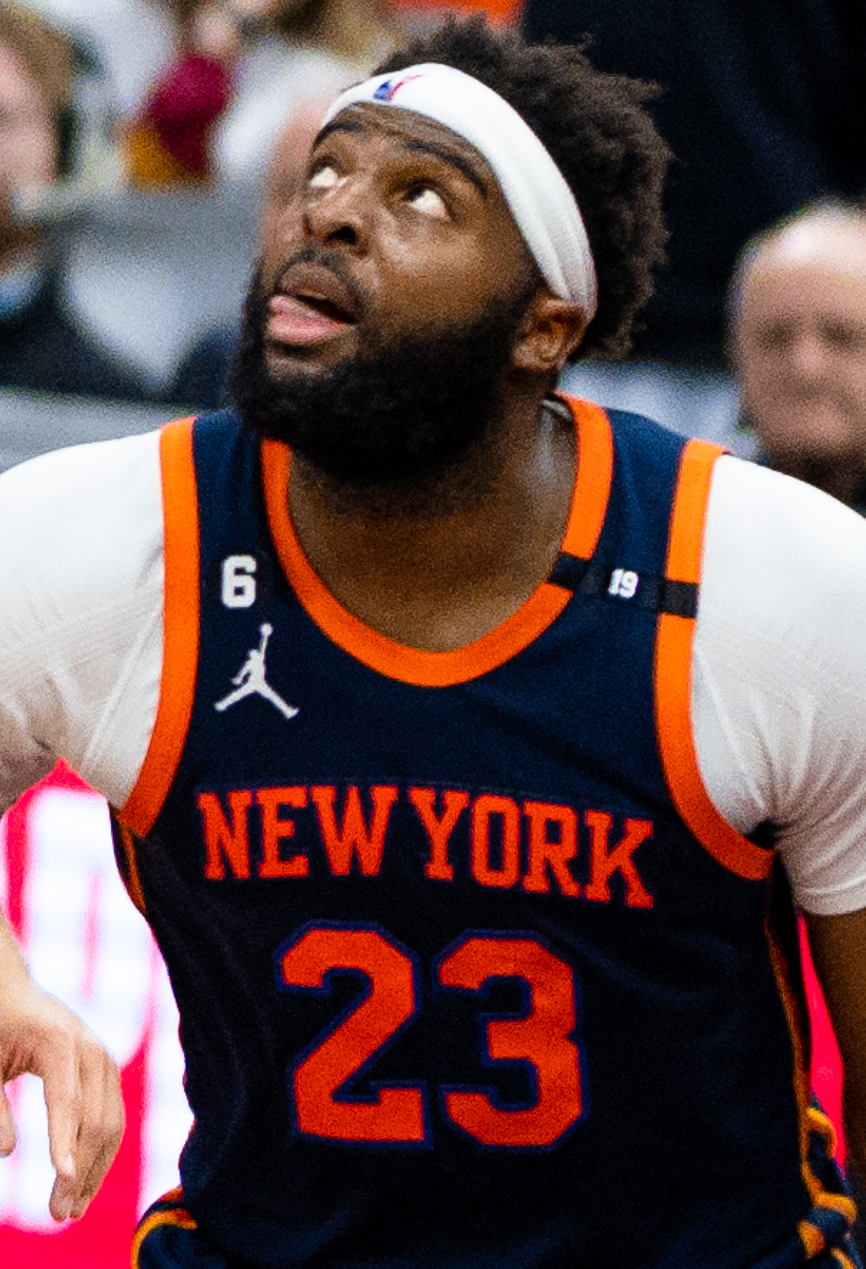
Mitchell Robinson

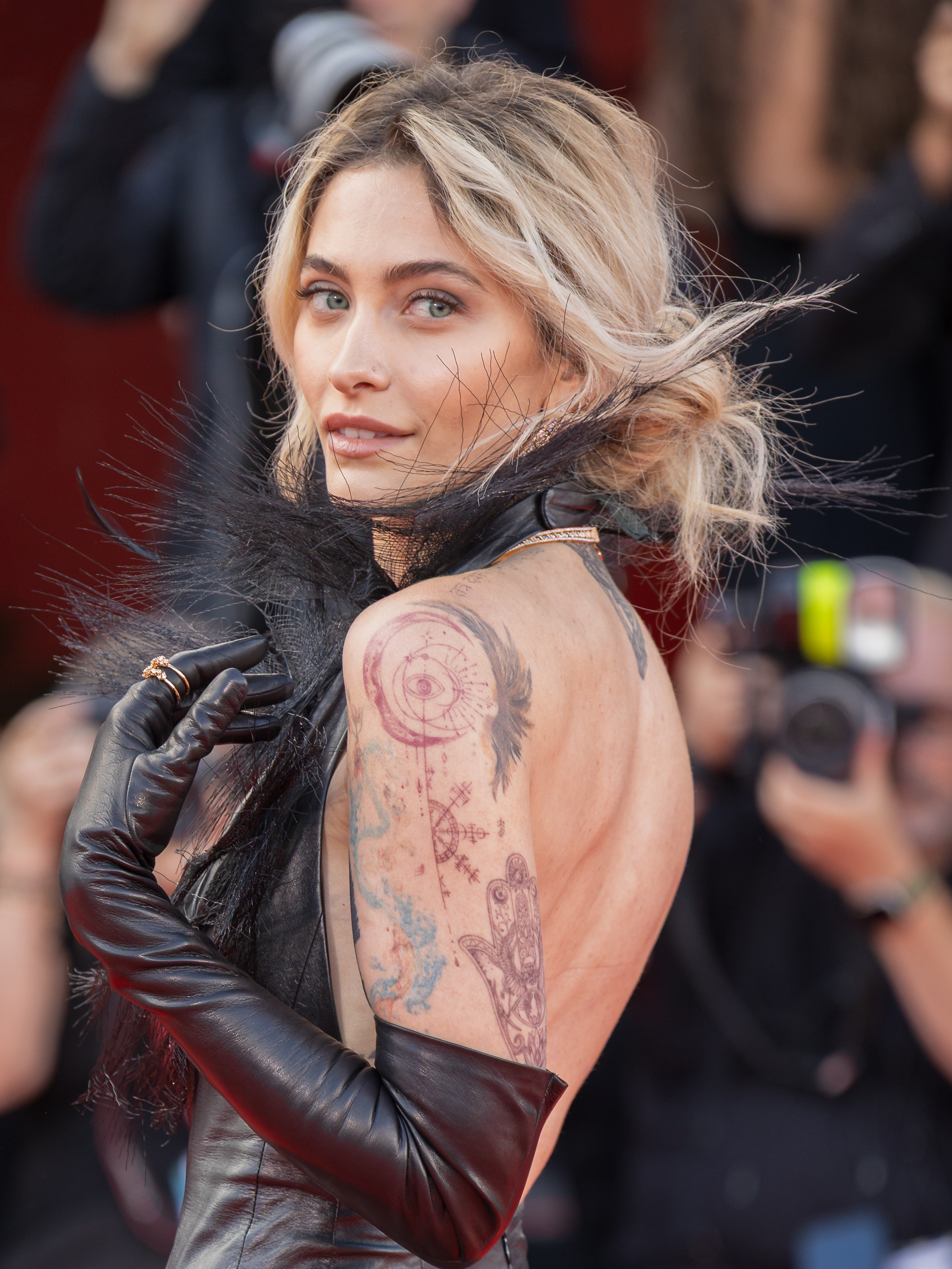
Paris Jackson

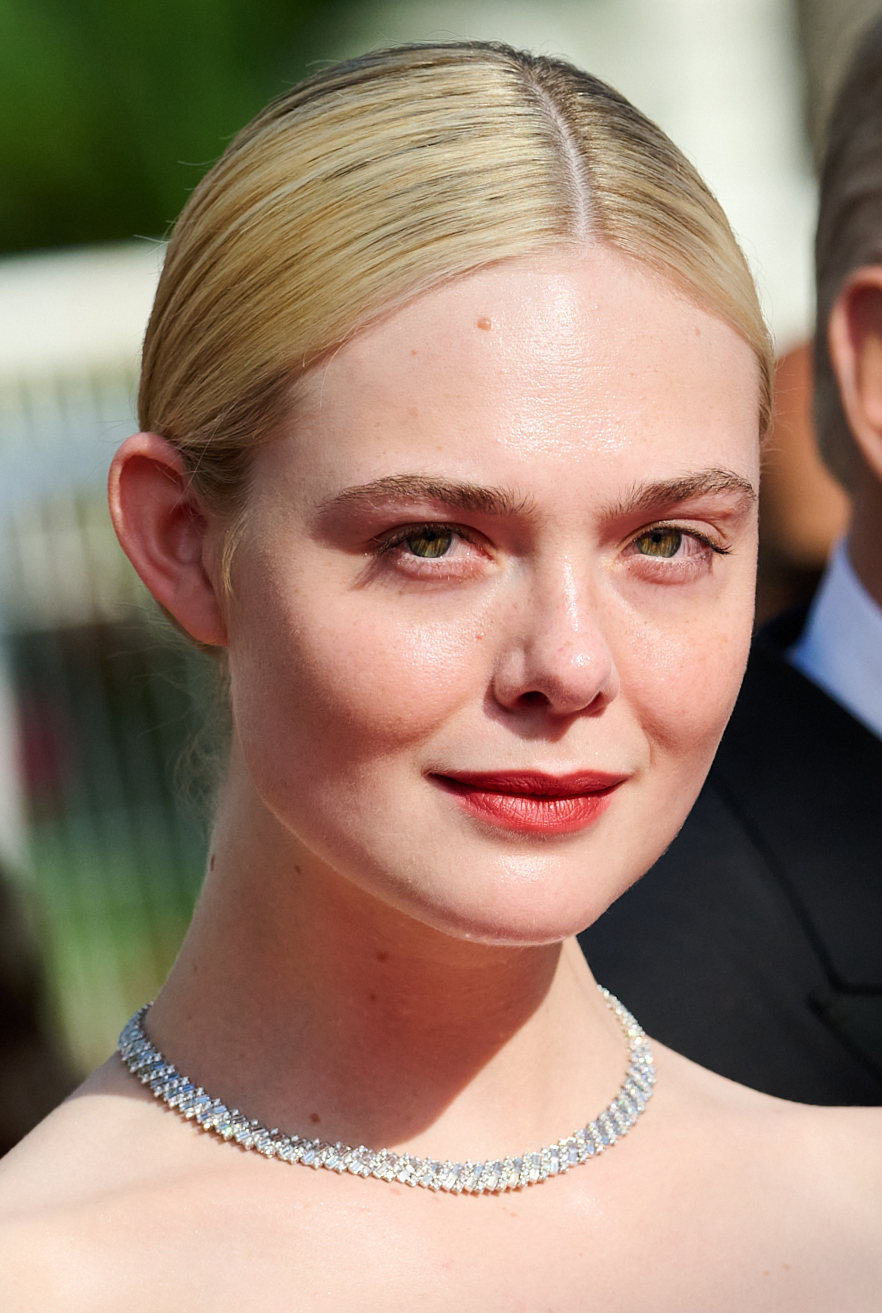
Elle Fanning

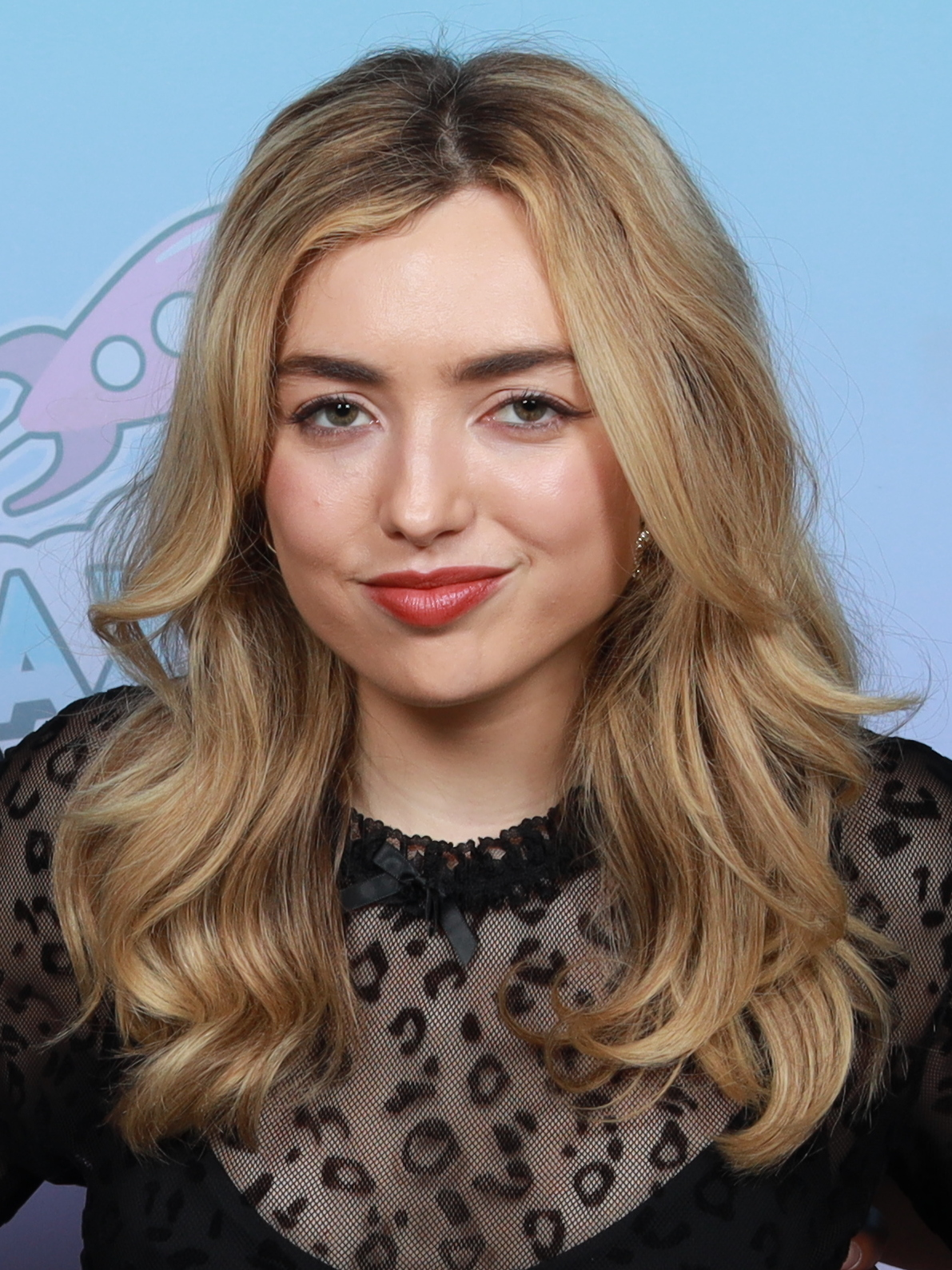
Peyton List

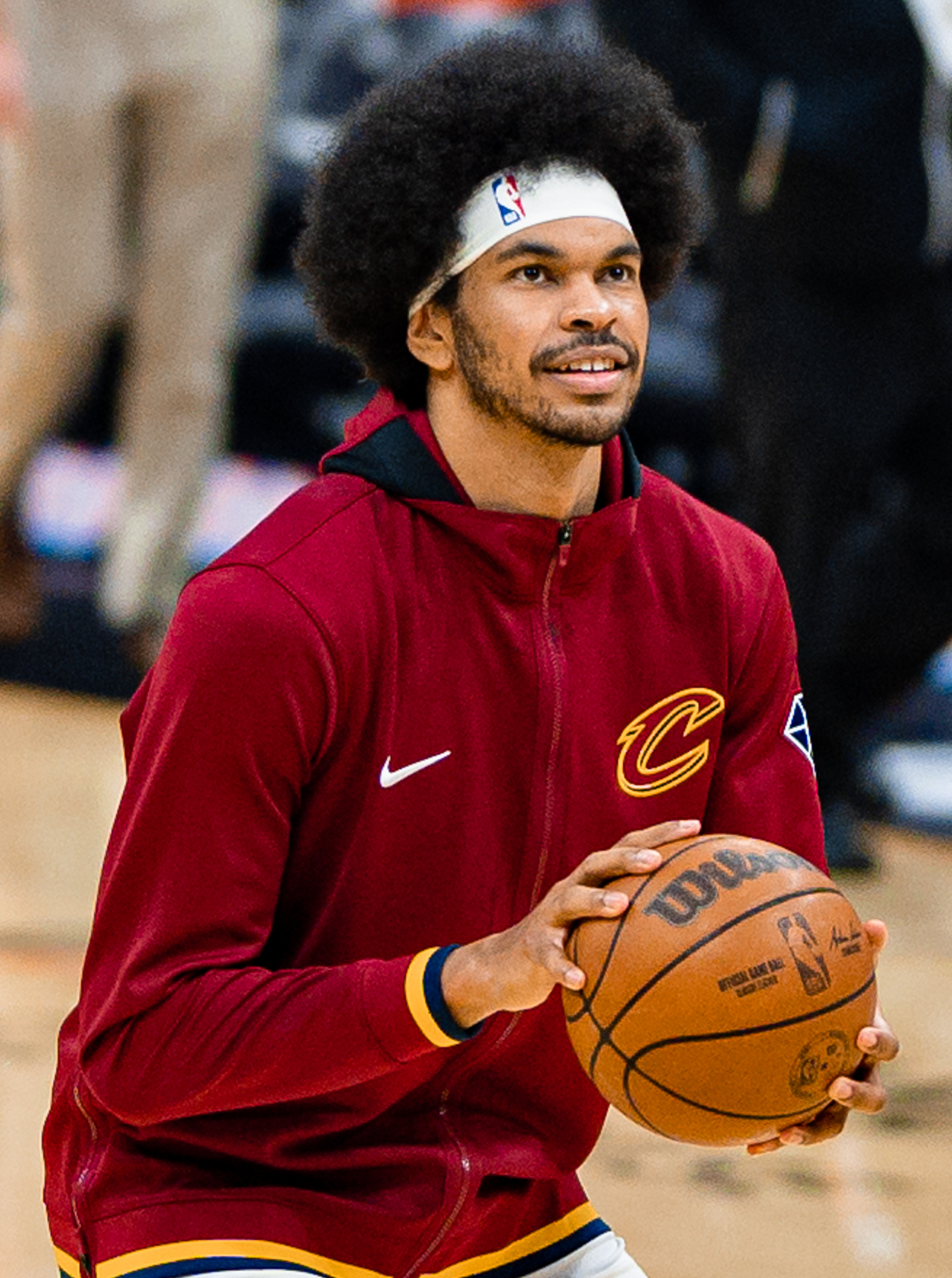
Jared Allen

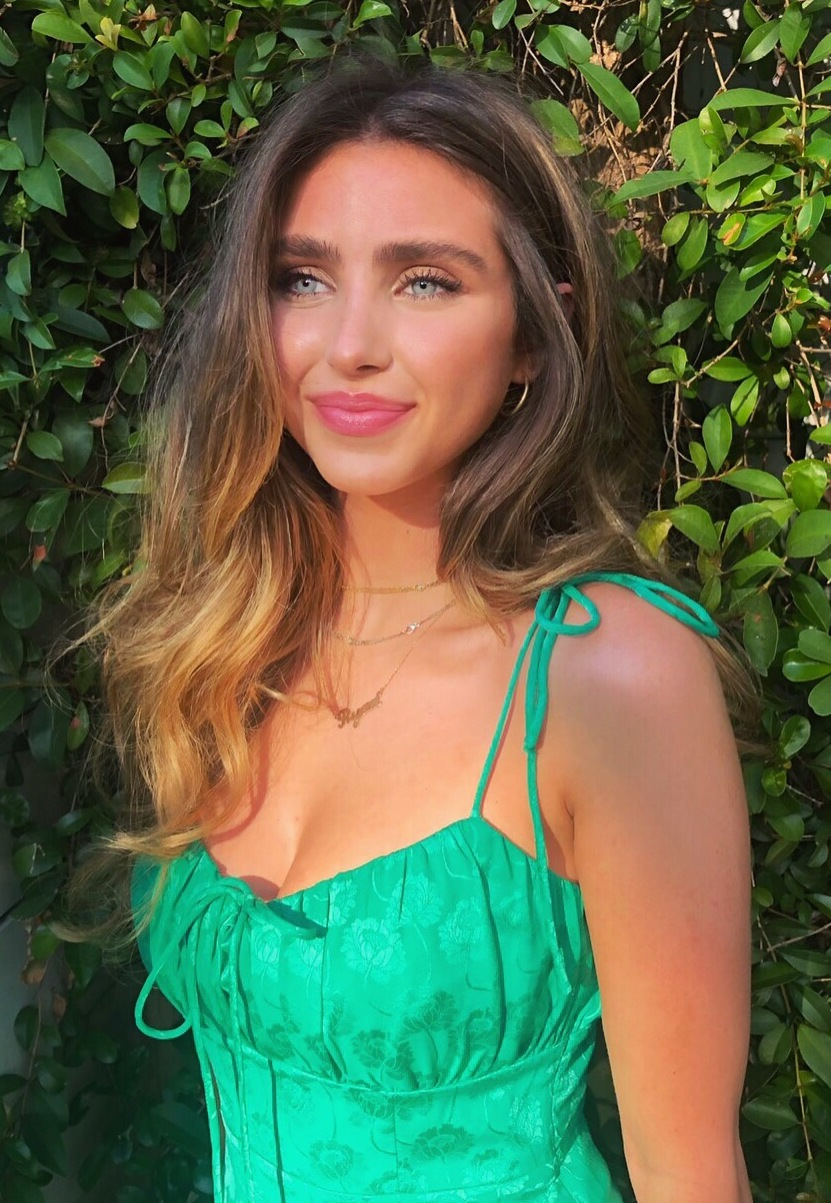
Ryan Whitney

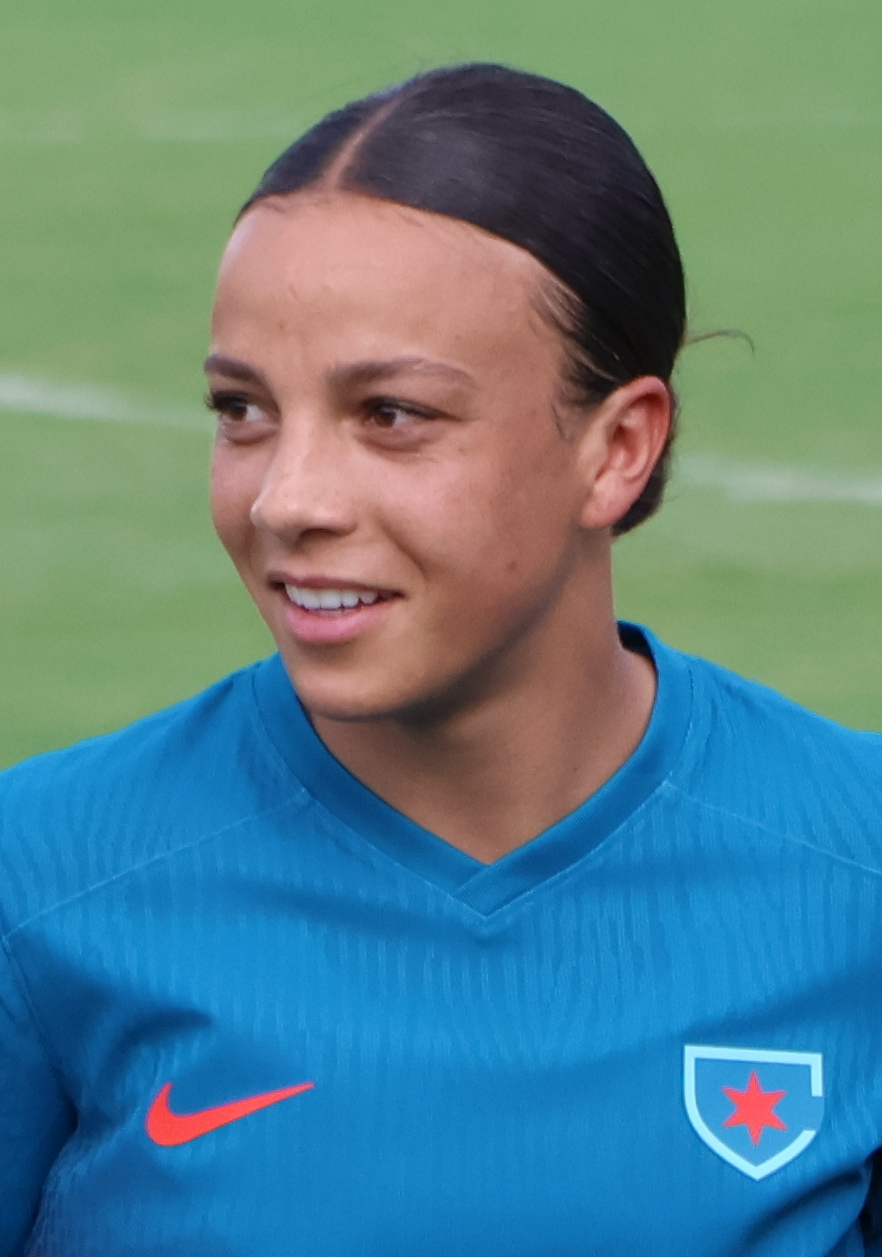
Mallory Swanson

- April 1 – Mitchell Robinson, basketball player
- April 3 – Paris Jackson, daughter of Michael Jackson
- April 4 – Malcolm Sutherland-Foggio, cancer fundraiser
- April 6
  - Peyton List, actress
  - Spencer List, actor
- April 9 – Elle Fanning, actress
- April 14 – Brandon Ratcliff, actor
- April 16 – Jake Vedder, Olympic snowboarder
- April 19 – Diondre Overton, football player (d. 2024)
- April 21 – Jarrett Allen, basketball player
- April 24 – Ryan Whitney, actress and singer
- April 27 – Blaze Bernstein, murder victim (d. 2018)
- April 29 – Mallory Swanson, soccer player

=== May ===
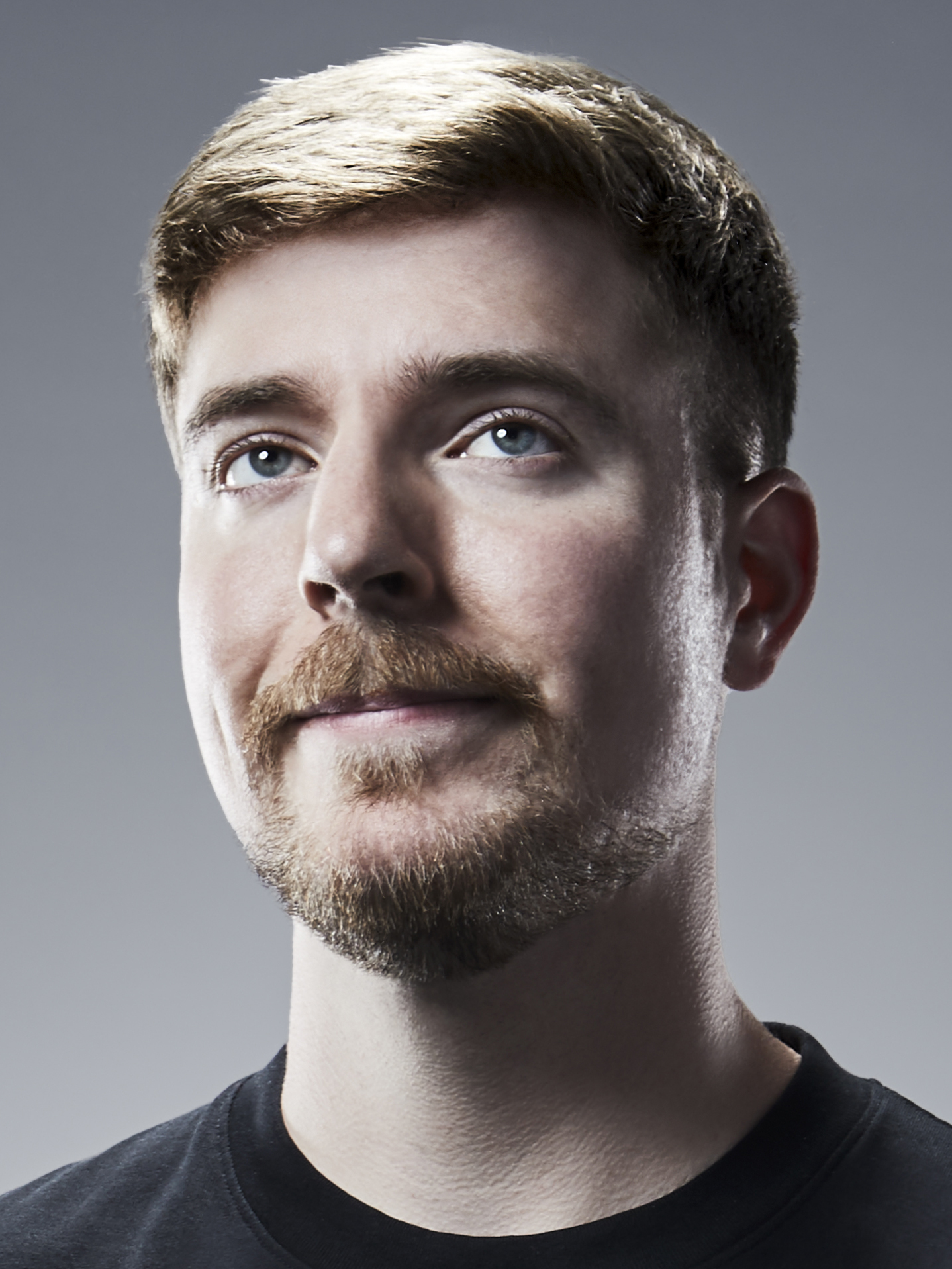
MrBeast

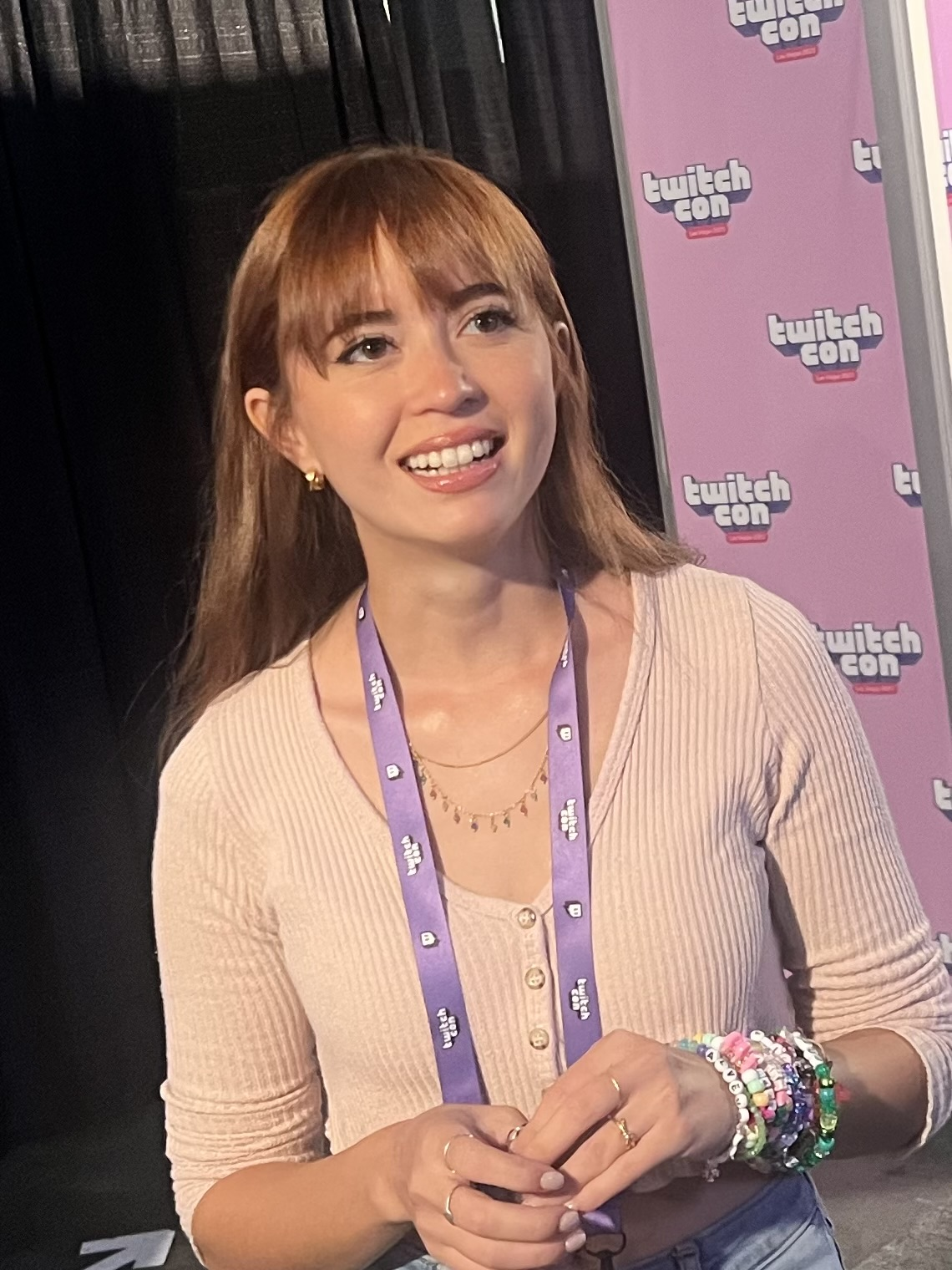
Maya Higa

- May 2
  - Ian Anderson, baseball pitcher
  - Tremaine Edmunds, football player
- May 4 – Frank Jackson, basketball player
- May 6
  - Lil Poison, notable video gamer
  - Luigi Mangione, suspect in the killing of UnitedHealthcare CEO Brian Thompson
  - Kayden Troff, chessmaster
- May 7 – MrBeast, YouTuber & philanthropist
- May 12 – Tornado Alicia Black, tennis player
- May 13 – Mickey Moniak, baseball outfielder
- May 17 – Terrance Ferguson, basketball player
- May 23
  - Steve Lacy, musician, singer/songwriter, and record producer
  - Ramona Young, actress
- May 24 – Maya Higa, YouTuber
- May 27 – Adam Riegler, actor

=== June ===
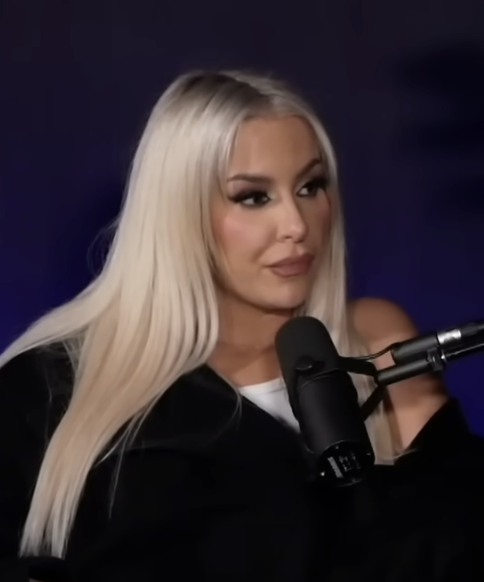
Tana Mongeau

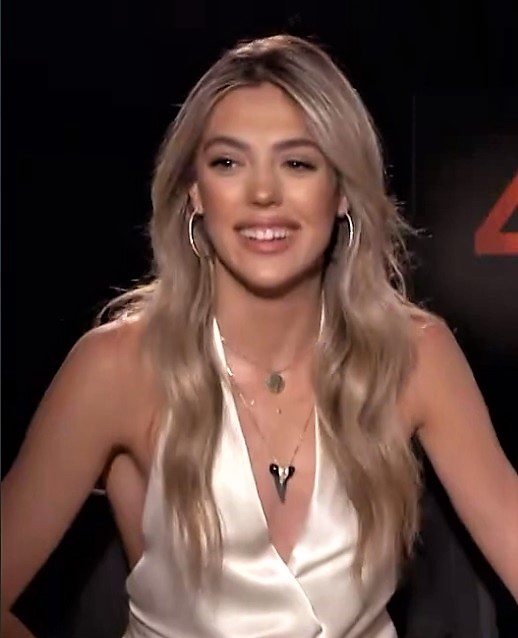
Sistine Stallone

- June 6 – Kenny Pickett, football player
- June 8 – Arjun Ayyangar, pianist
- June 9 – Ben Loomis, Olympic skier
- June 11 – Hank Walker, wrestler
- June 14 – Azaria Hill, Olympic bobsledder
- June 15 – Rachel Covey, actress
- June 16 – Lauren Taylor, actress and singer
- June 18 – Masha Slamovich, Russian-born wrestler
- June 19
  - Joey Jett, skateboarder
  - Atticus Shaffer, actor
- June 24
  - Coy Stewart, actor
  - Tana Mongeau, YouTuber
- June 27 – Sistine Stallone, actress
- June 29 – Michael Porter Jr., basketball player

=== July ===
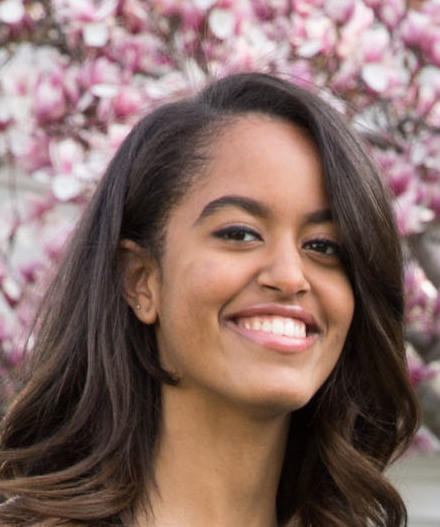
Malia Obama

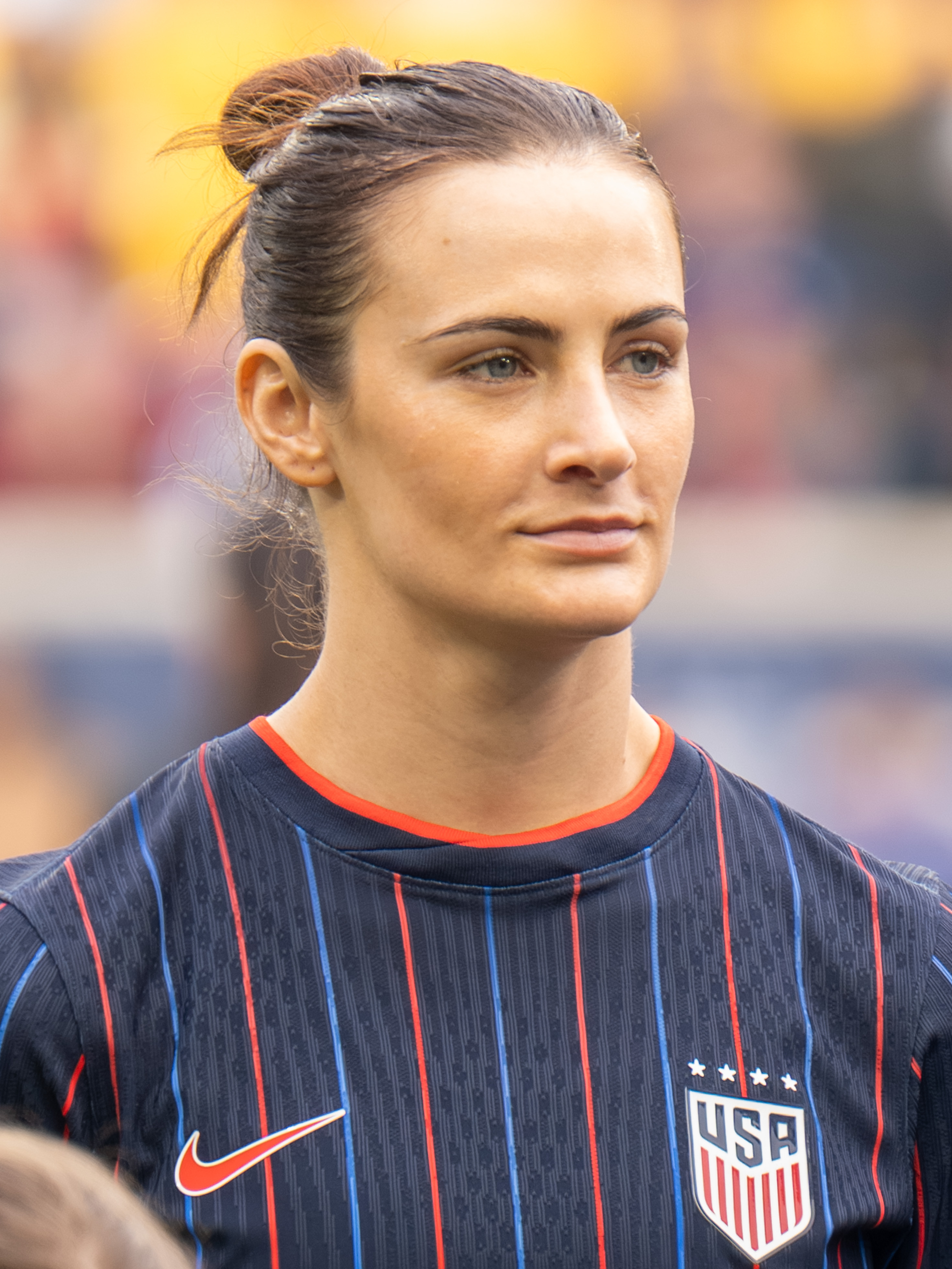
Emily Fox

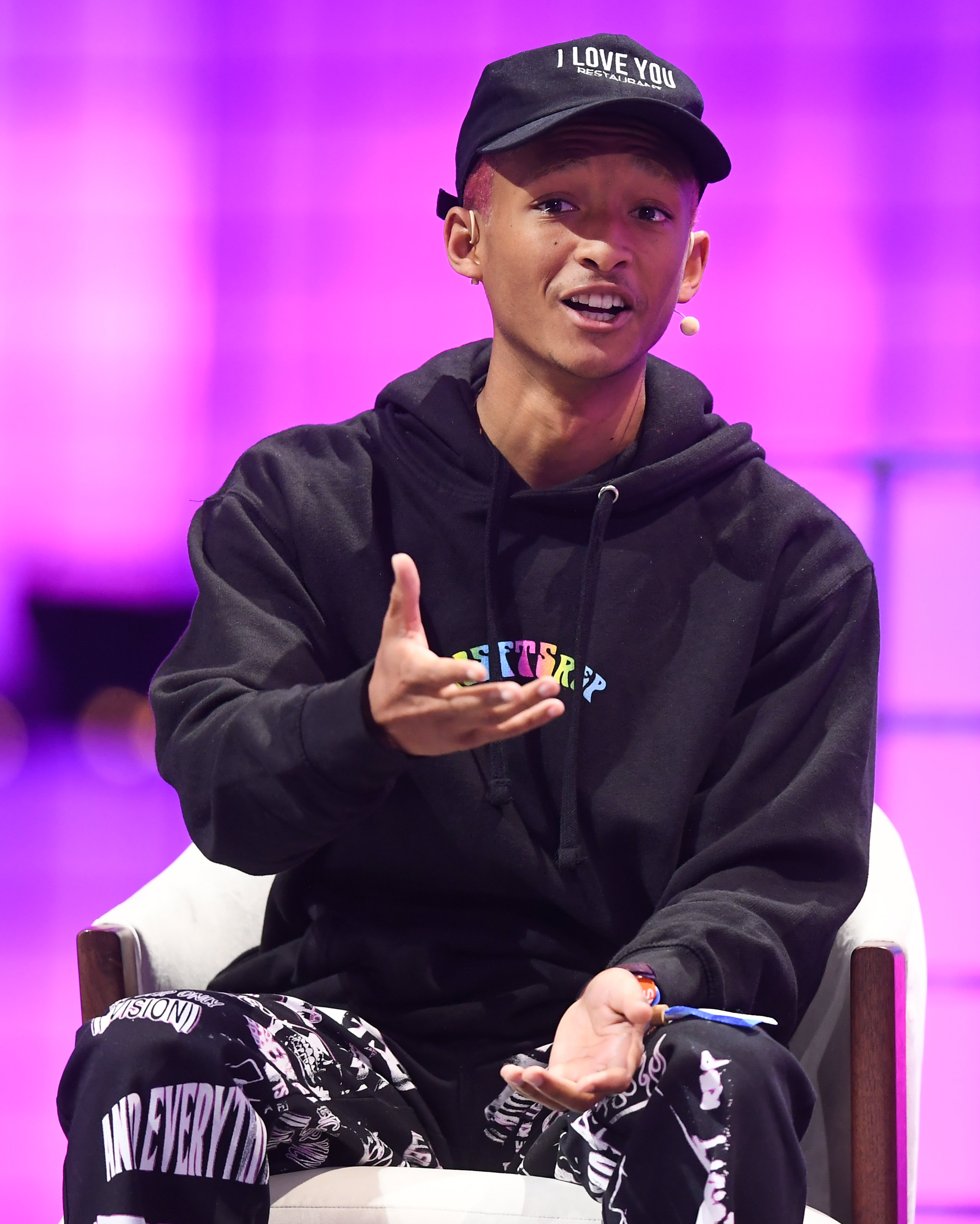
Jaden Smith

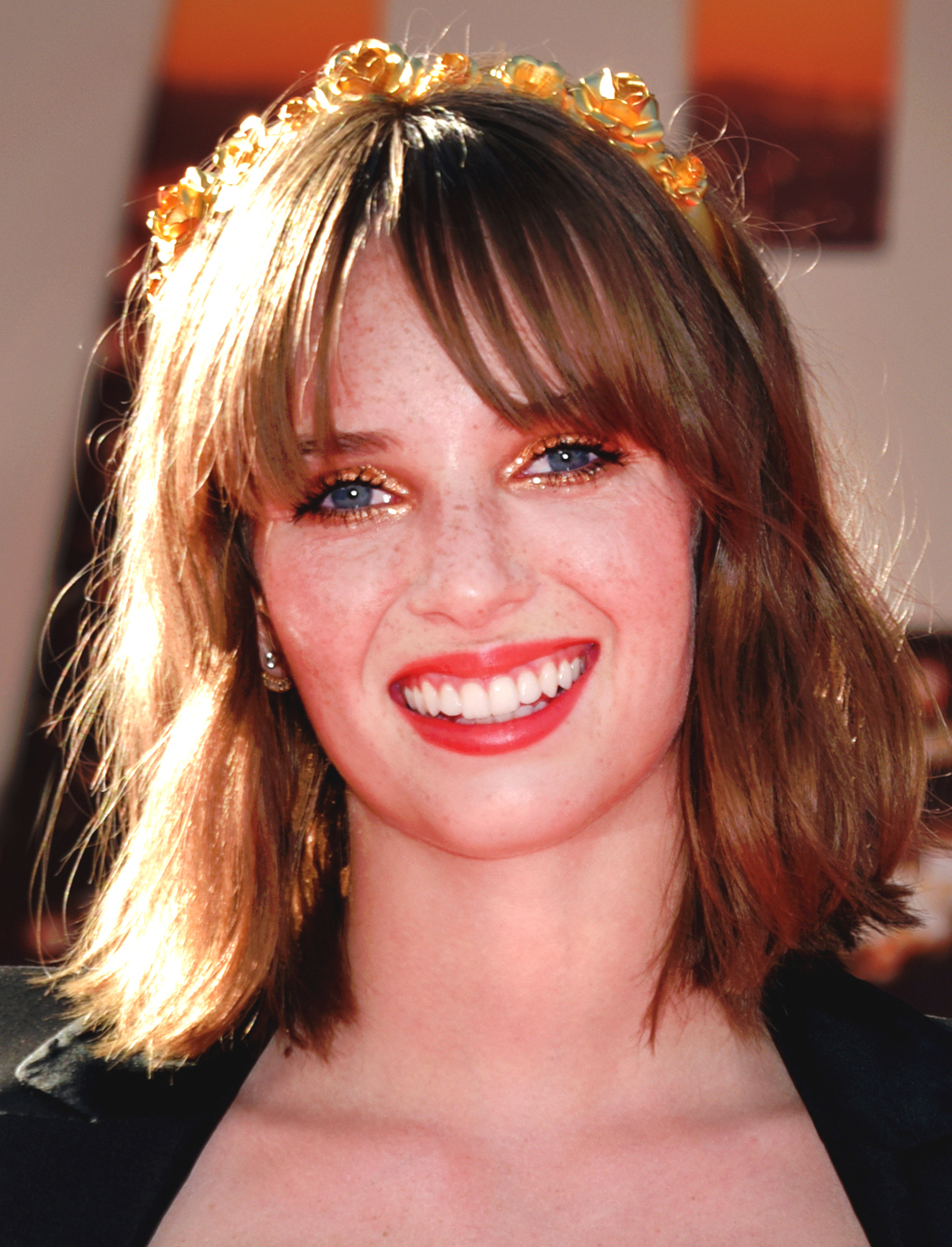
Maya Hawke

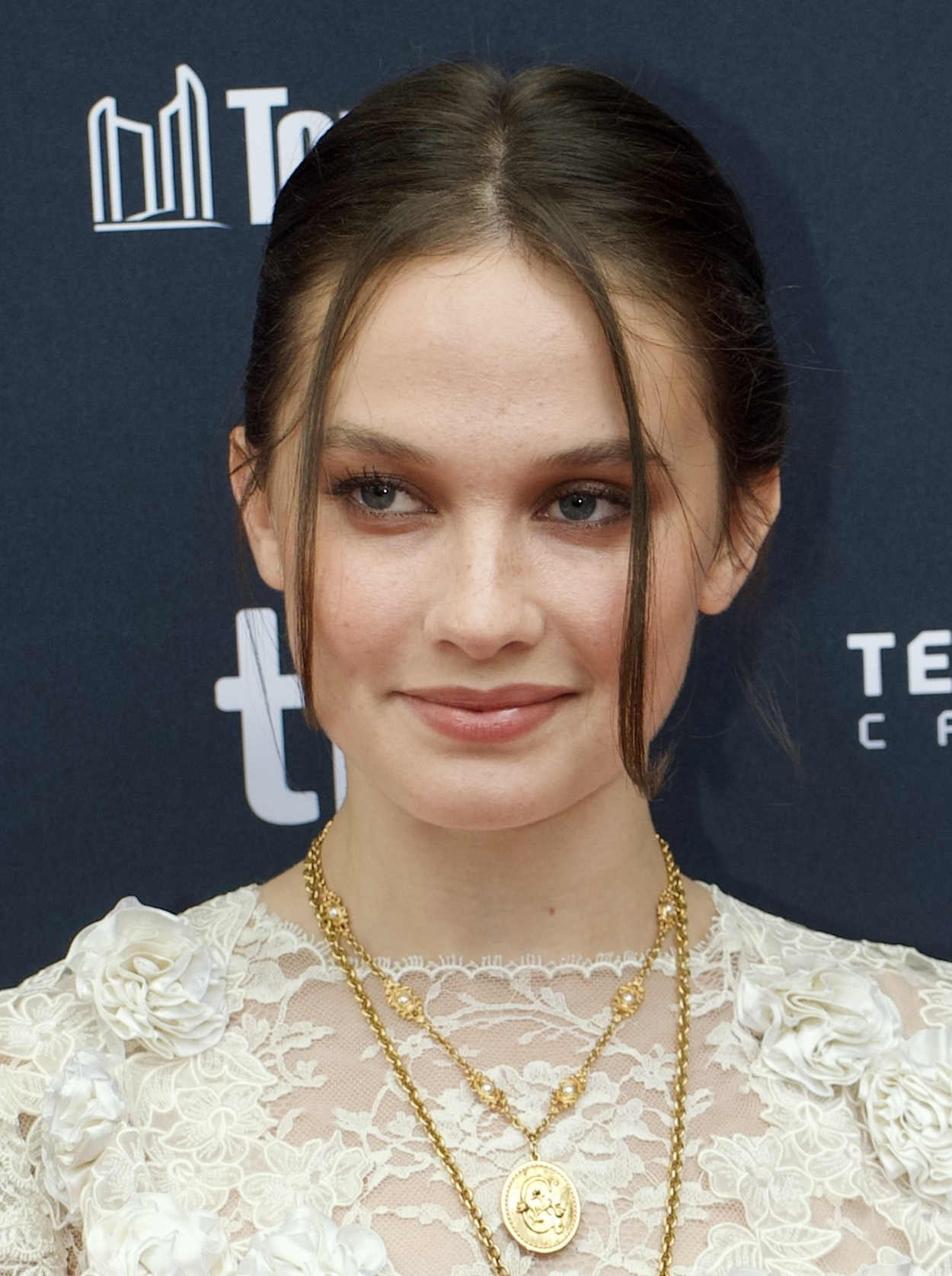
Cailee Spaeny

- July 1 – Chloe Bailey, singer/songwriter, record producer, and actress
- July 4 – Malia Obama, daughter of Barack Obama and Michelle Obama
- July 5 – Emily Fox, soccer player
- July 7 – Dylan Sprayberry, actor
- July 8 – Jaden Smith, actor, rapper, songwriter, dancer, and the son of Will Smith and Jada Pinkett Smith
- July 9 – Robert Capron, actor
- July 10
  - Angus Cloud, actor (d. 2023)
  - Haley Pullos, actress
  - Hailey Swirbul, Olympic cross-country skier
- July 15
  - JayDaYoungan, rapper (d. 2022)
  - Noah Gragson, stock car racing driver
  - Tanner Maguire, actor
- July 18 – D. Savage, rapper
- July 19
  - Karl Jacobs, YouTuber
  - Lola Vice, wrestler
- July 19 – Oliver Crane, rower
- July 22 – Madison Pettis, actress
- July 24 – Cailee Spaeny, actress
- July 27 – Patrick Crusius, mass murderer
- July 29 – Clayton Keller, ice hockey player
- July 30 – Jake Pates, Olympic snowboarder
- July 31
  - Bretman Rock, vlogger
  - Rico Rodriguez, actor
  - Maya Hawke, actress

=== August ===
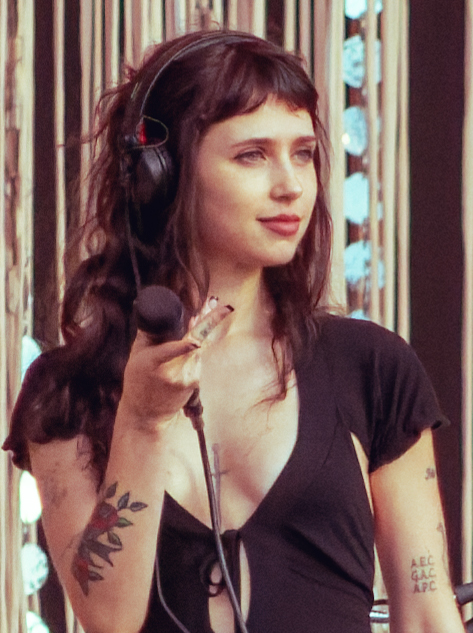
Clairo

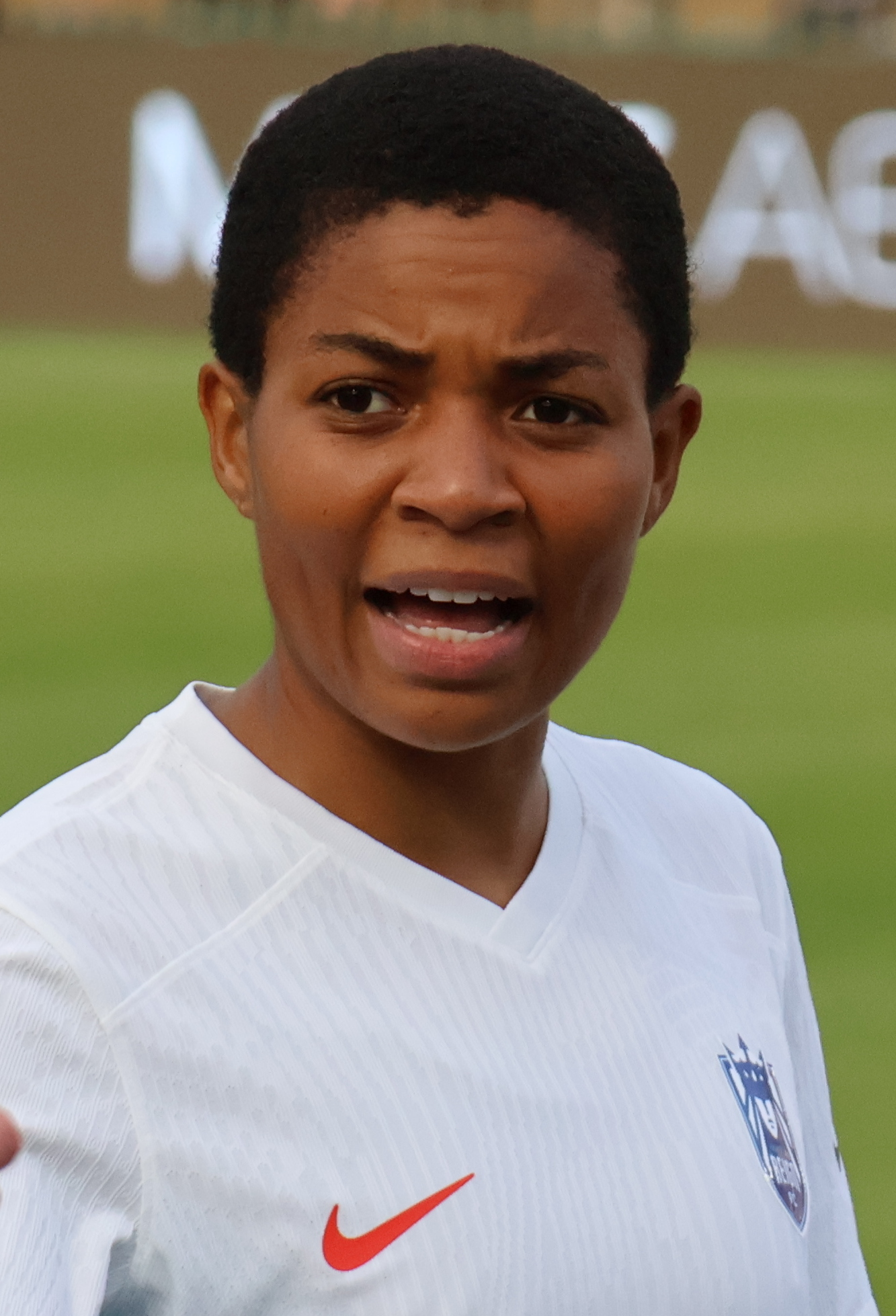
Tziarra King

- August 1
  - Khamani Griffin, actor
  - Heimana Reynolds, skateboarder
- August 3 – Cozi Zuehlsdorff, actress and singer
- August 4 – Lil Skies, rapper
- August 6 – Forrest Goodluck, actor
- August 7 – Jalen Hurts, football player
- August 8 – Ryan Garcia, boxer
- August 11 – Nadia Azzi, pianist
- August 13 – Justin Schoenefeld, freestyle skier
- August 18
  - Nick Fuentes, YouTuber
  - Clairo, singer/songwriter
- August 24 – Tziarra King, soccer player
- August 25 – China Anne McClain, actress and singer
- August 27 – Rod Wave, musician
- August 28 – Weston McKennie, soccer player
- August 29 – D'Angelo Wallace, youtube commentator

=== September ===
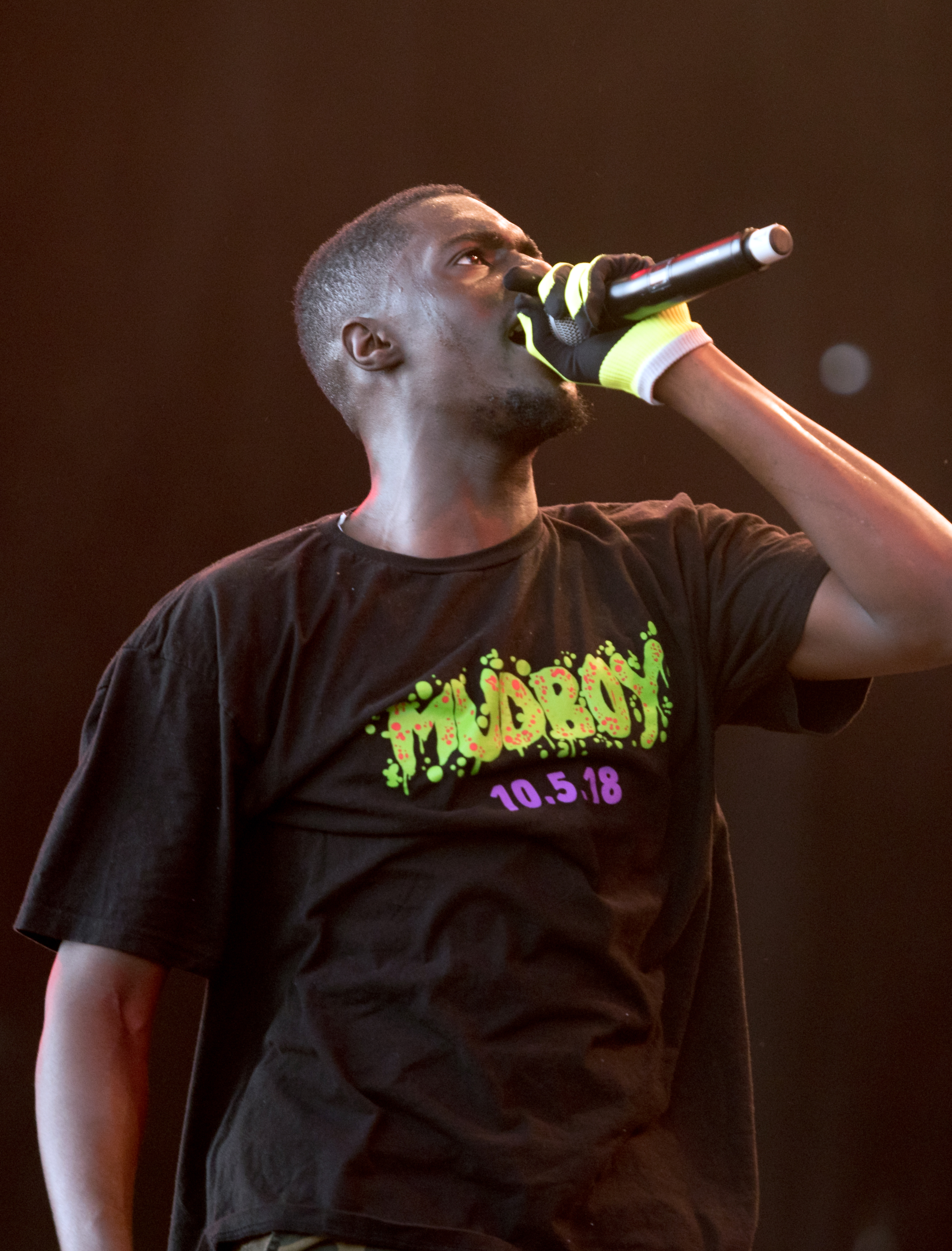
Sheck Wes

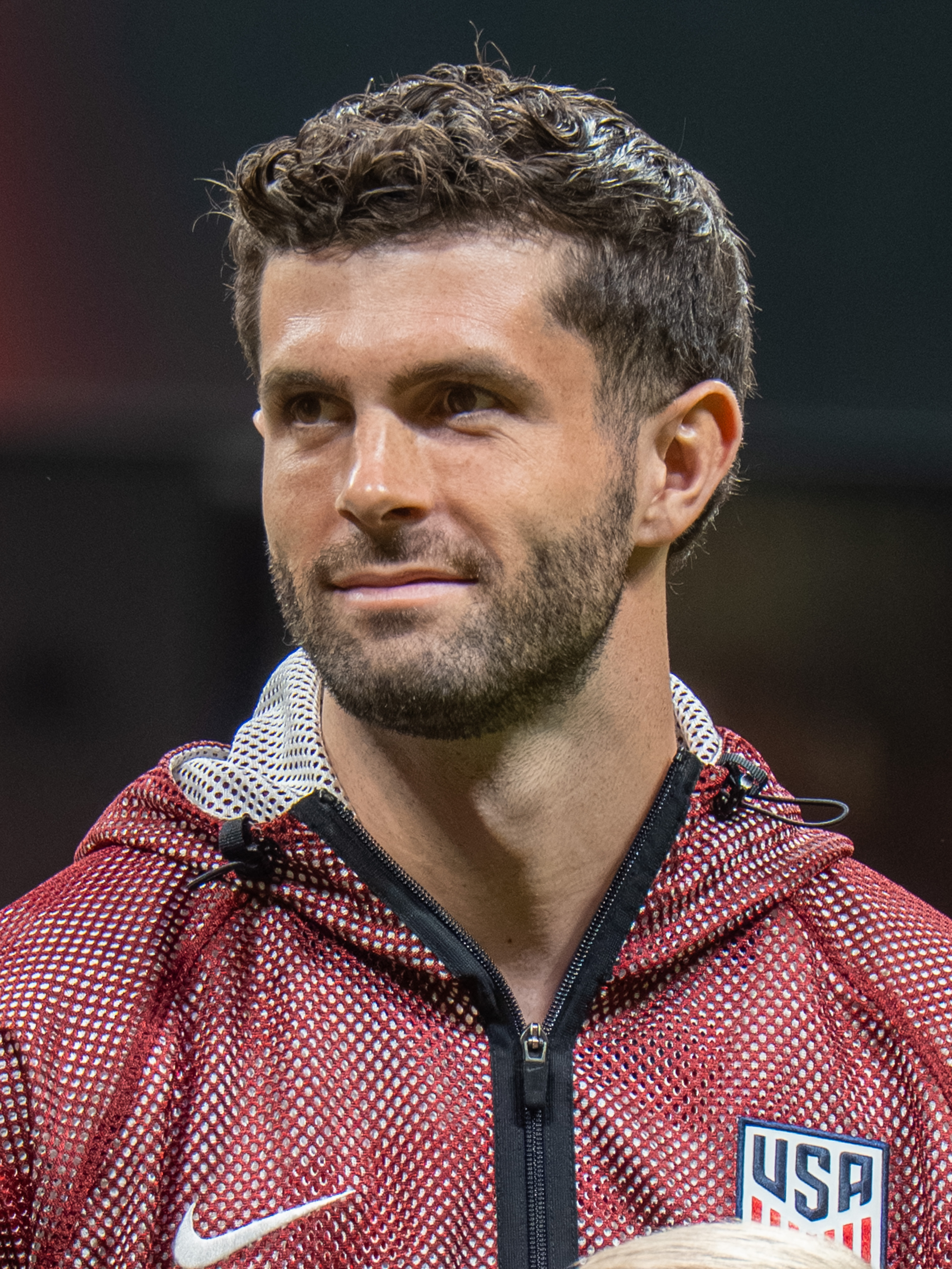
Christian Pulisic

- September 2 – Austin Cindric, stock car driver
- September 5 – Mac Jones, football player
- September 7 – YK Osiris, rapper
- September 10 – Sheck Wes, rapper
- September 11 – Makenna Cowgill, actress
- September 14 – Wan Kuzain, Malaysian soccer player
- September 18 – Christian Pulisic, soccer player
- September 21
  - Alex Hall, Olympic freestyle skier
  - Brino quadruplets, actors
- September 24 – Nikolas Cruz, mass murderer
- September 28 – Jenna Rose, singer

=== October ===
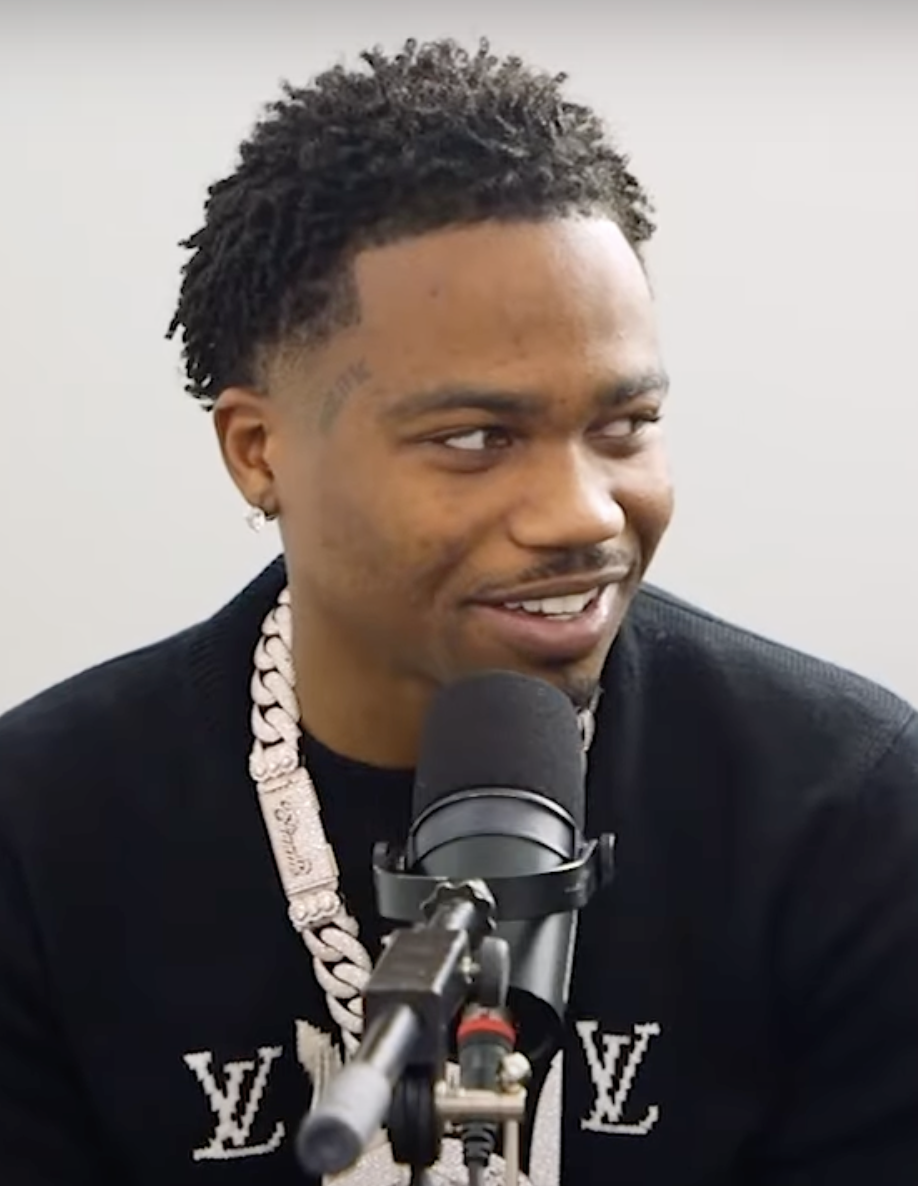
Roddy Ricch

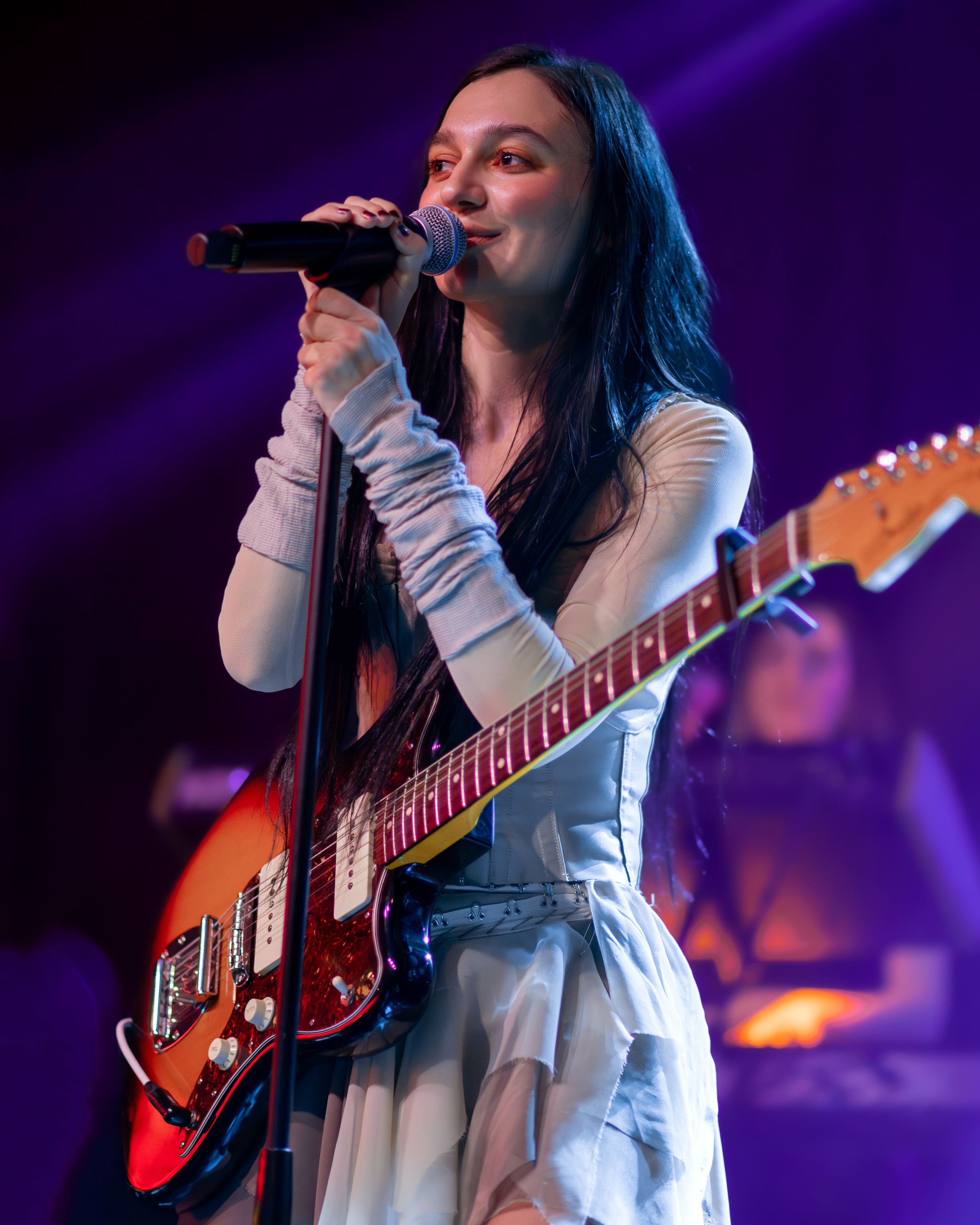
Daya

- October 1
  - Hunter Hess, Olympic freestyle skier
  - Danika Yarosh, actress and dancer
- October 4 – Christopher Lillis, freestyle skier
- October 6 – Matt Cornett, actor and singer
- October 7 – Ryan Trahan, YouTuber
- October 15 – Ryder Anderson, football player
- October 18 – Emily Robinson, actress
- October 20 – Thomas Rousseau, far-right activist and founder of Patriot Front
- October 22
  - Kelani Jordan, wrestler
  - Roddy Ricch, rapper
- October 24 – Daya
- October 23 – Amandla Stenberg, actress
- October 26 – Samantha Isler, actress
- October 28
  - Nolan Gould, actor
  - Stephen Nedoroscik, artistic gymnast
- October 29 – Prince Constantine Alexios of Greece and Denmark, son of Pavlos, Crown Prince of Greece

=== November ===
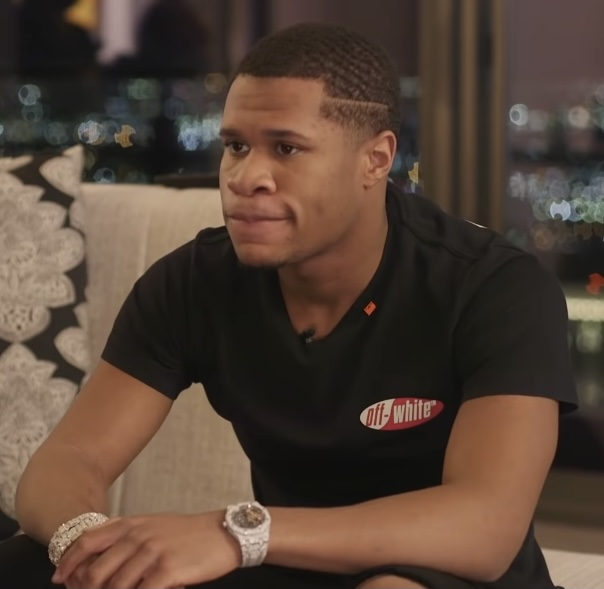
Devin Haney

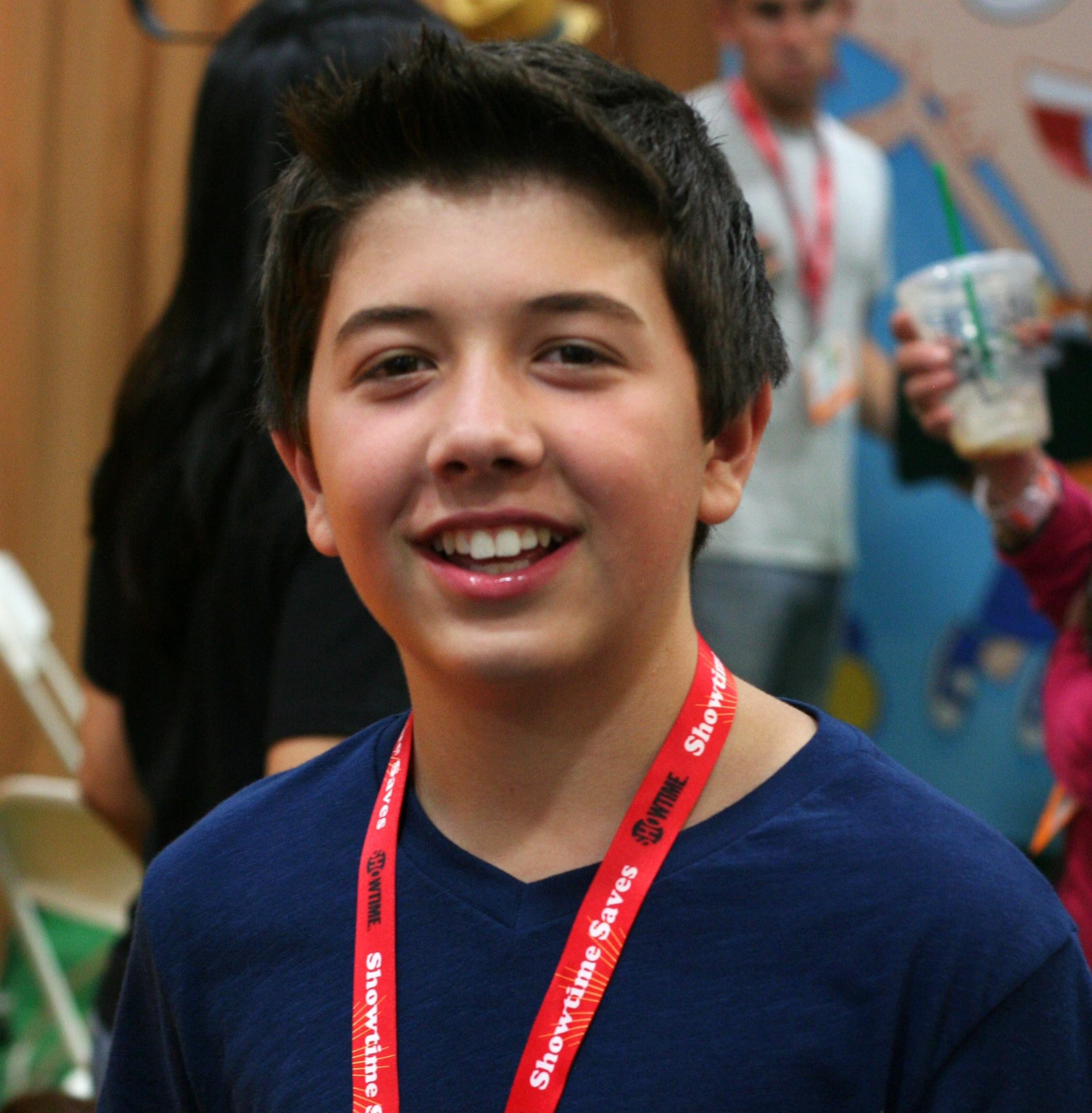
Bradley Steven Perry

- November 2 – Jordan Love, football player
- November 4 – Darcy Rose Byrnes, actress and singer
- November 13 – Gattlin Griffith, actor
- November 14 – DeVonta Smith, football player
- November 17
  - Devin Haney, boxer
  - Kara Hayward, actress
- November 18 – Ruby Jerins, actress
- November 20 – Savannah Robinson, singer
- November 23
  - Just Sam, singer
  - Bradley Steven Perry, actor
- November 24
  - Peyton Meyer, actor
  - Brecken Palmer, actor
  - Bridger Palmer, actor
  - Jeremy Swayman, ice hockey player

=== December ===
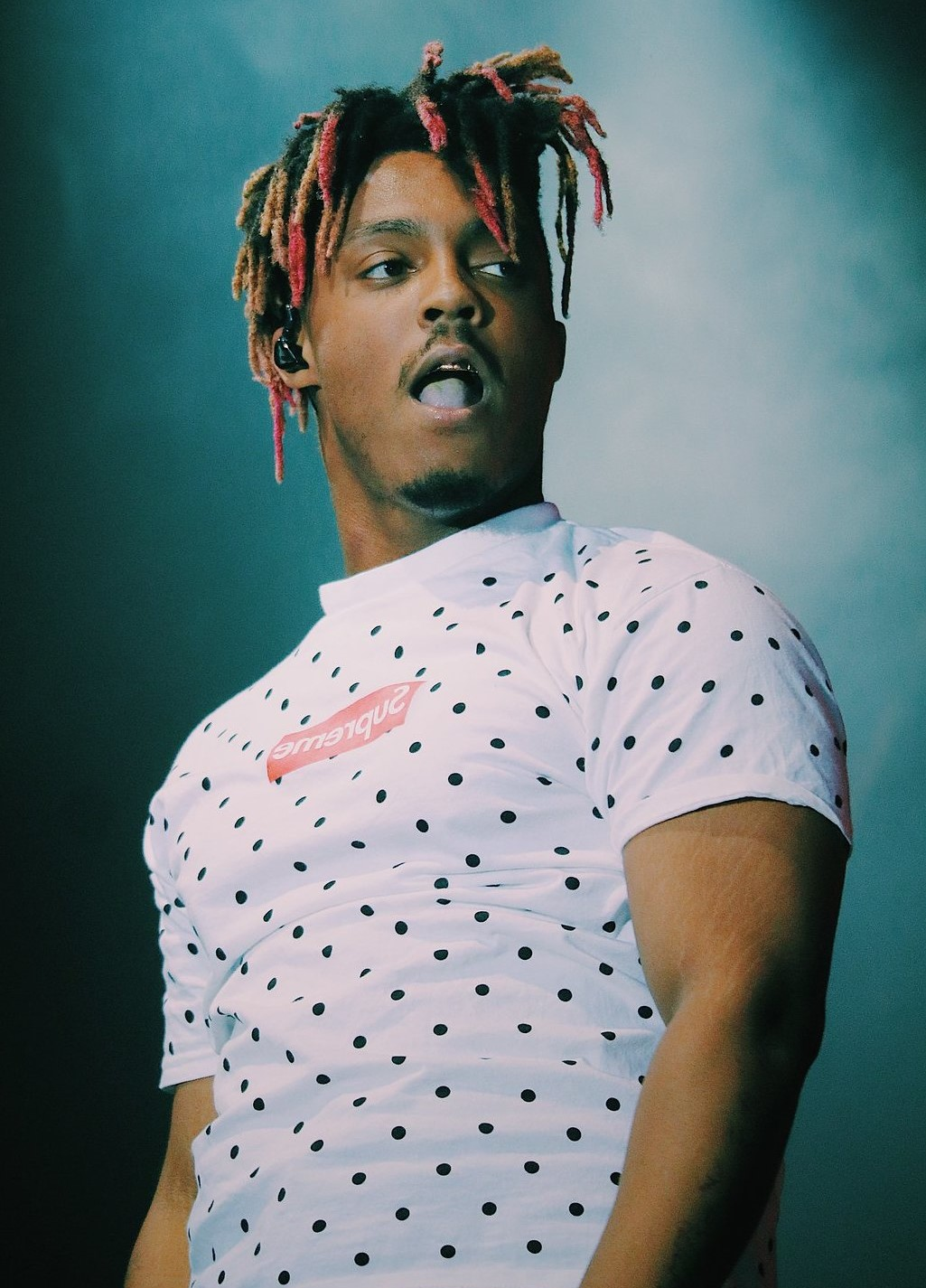
Juice Wrld

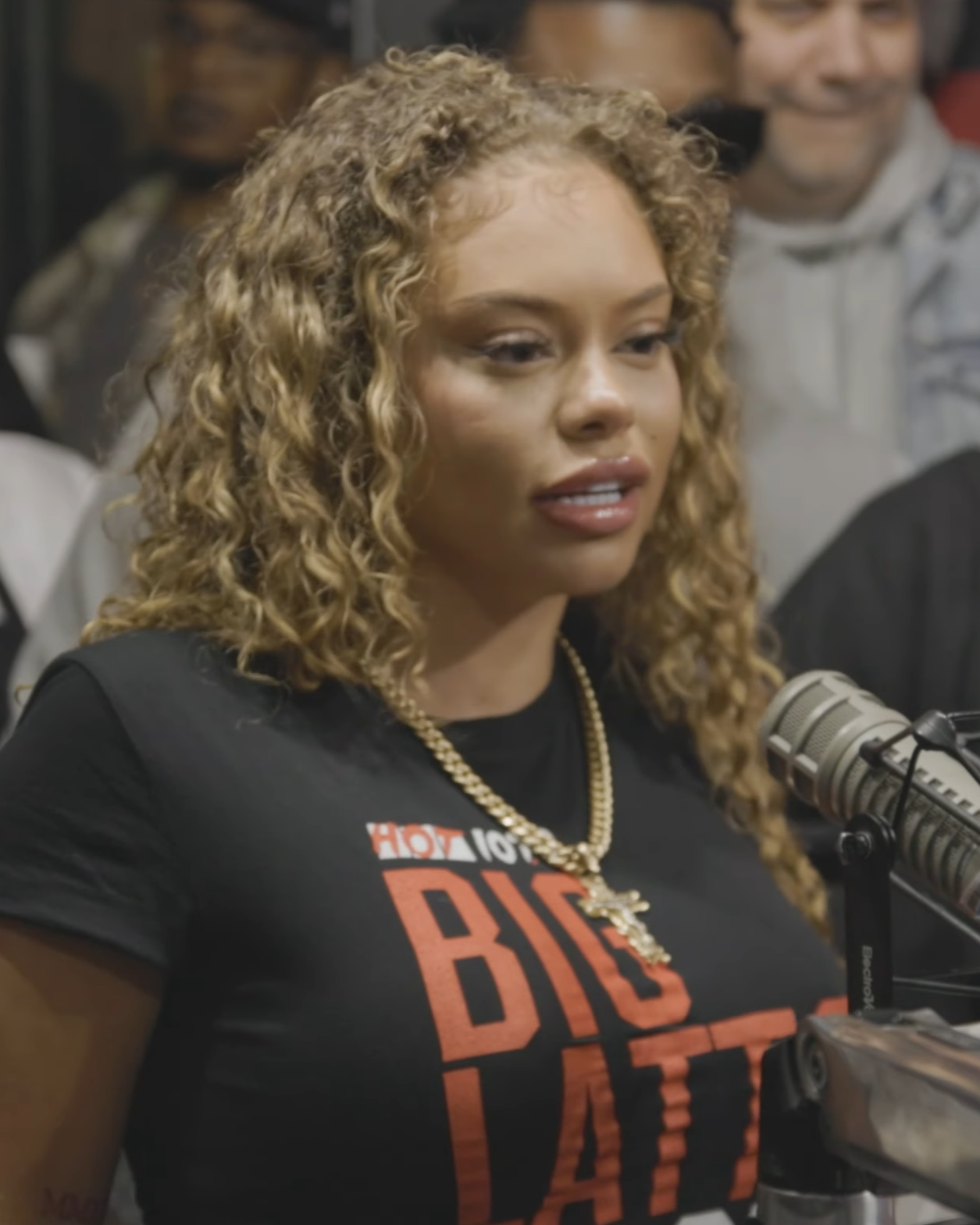
Latto

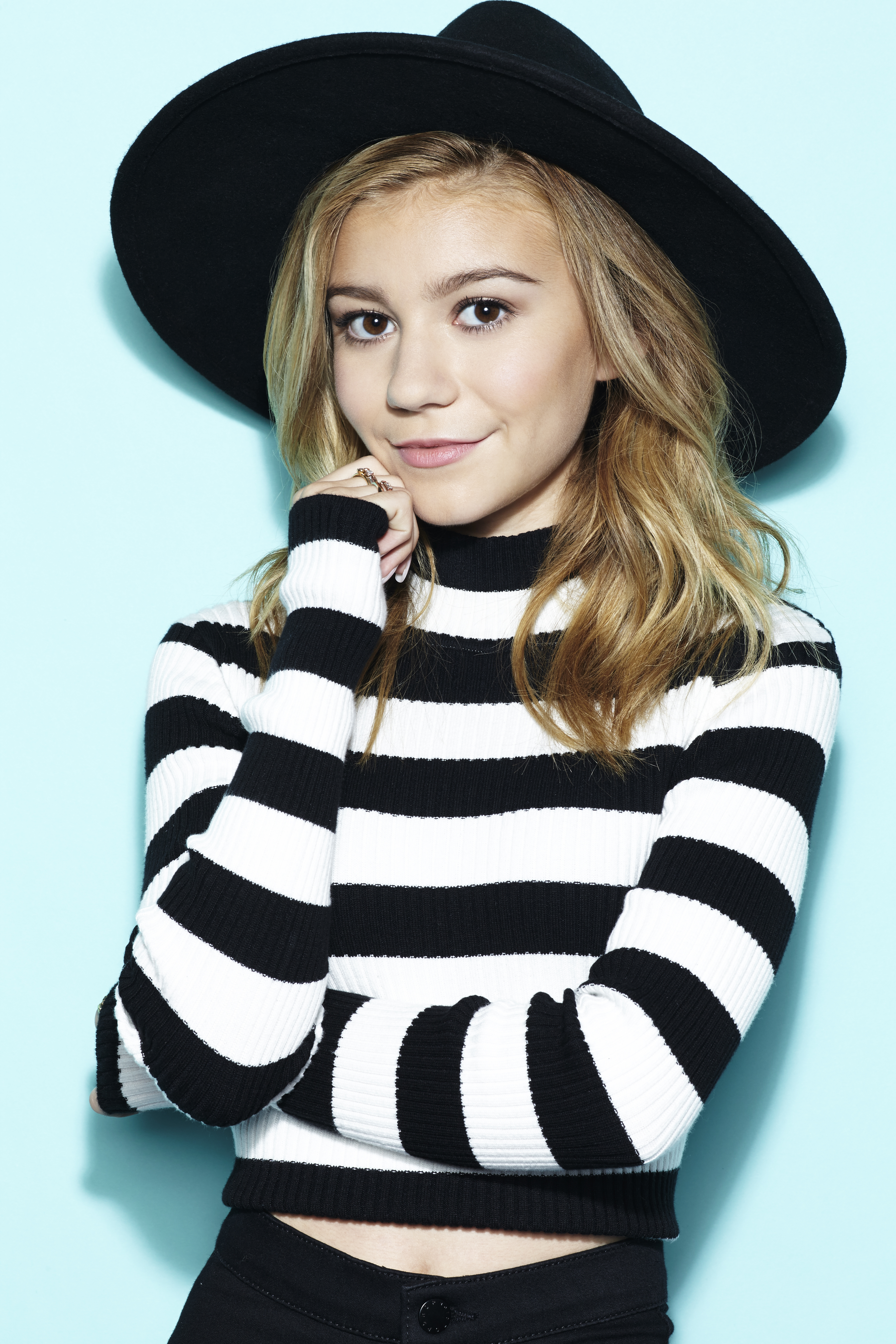
G Hannelius

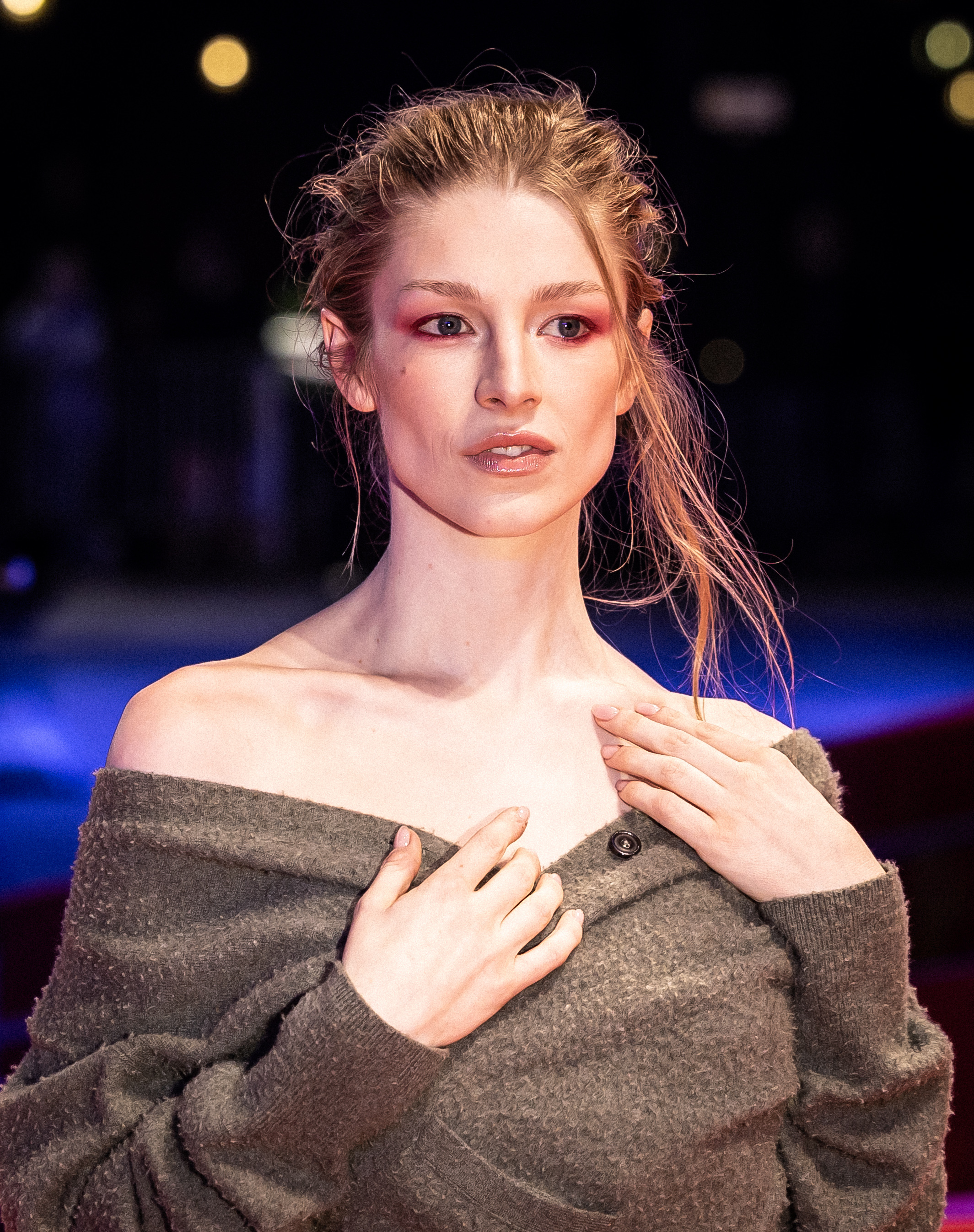
Hunter Schafer

- December – Chukwu octuplets
- December 2
  - Amber Frank, actress
  - Juice Wrld, rapper (d. 2019)
- December 8
  - Tanner Buchanan, actor
  - Owen Teague, actor
- December 14 – Lonnie Walker IV, basketball player
- December 15 – Chandler Canterbury, actor
- December 16 – Kiara Muhammad, actress and singer
- December 18
  - Jake Oettinger, ice hockey player
  - Winter Vinecki, Olympic freestyle skier and marathon runner
- December 22
  - G Hannelius, actress
  - Latto, rapper
- December 26 – Adriana Rizzo, wrestler
- December 27 – Grayson Russell, actor
- December 28
  - Jordyn Barratt, skateboarder
  - Paris Berelc, actress
  - Jared Gilman, actor
- December 29
  - Seamus Davey-Fitzpatrick, actor
  - Kaz Grala, stock car racing driver
- December 31 – Hunter Schafer, actress and model

=== Full date unknown ===
- Jesse Koochin, notable euthanasia victim (d. 2004)

== Deaths ==
=== January ===
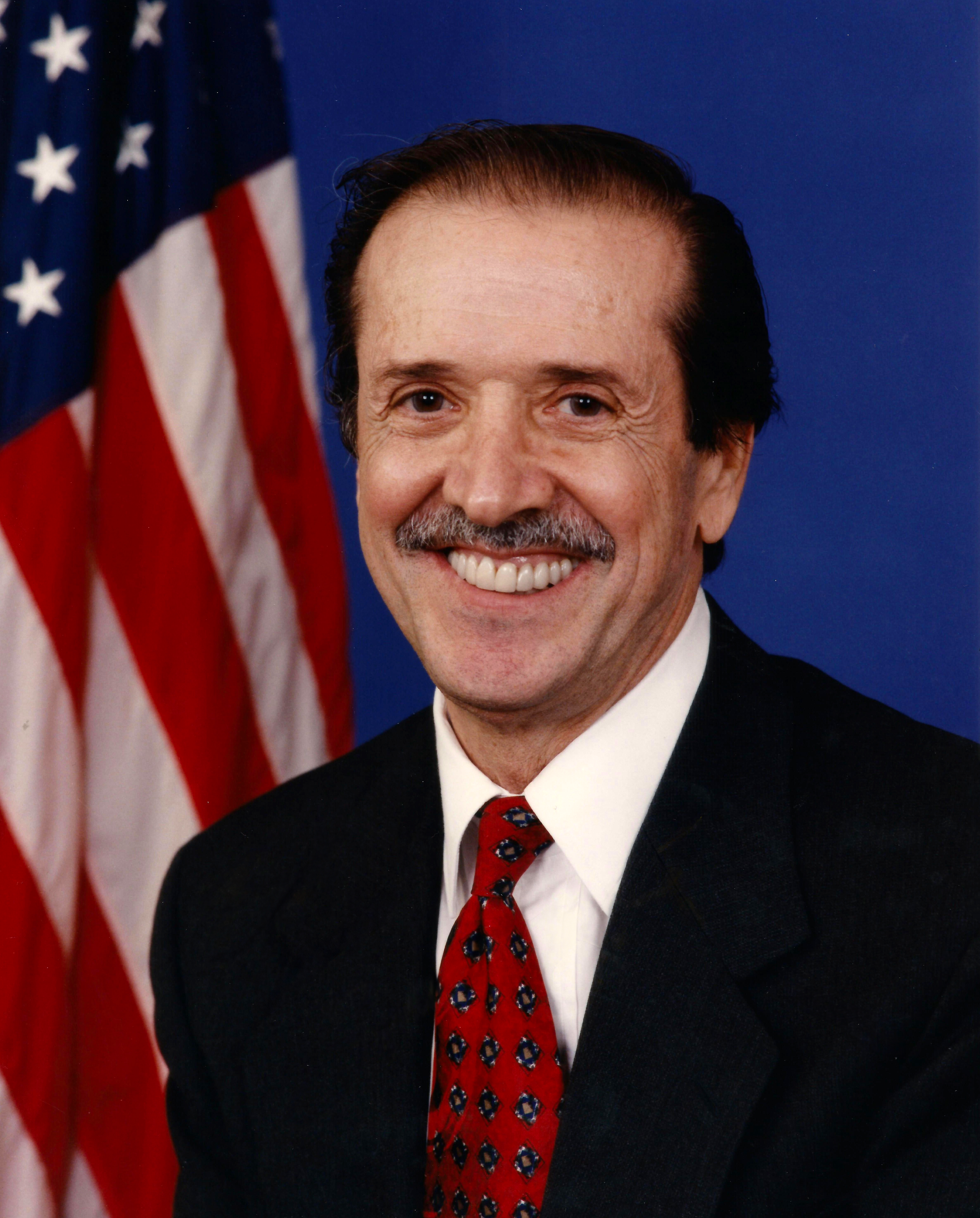
Sonny Bono

- January 1 – Helen Wills, American tennis player (b. 1905)
- January 4 – Mae Questel, American actress (b. 1908)
- January 5 – Sonny Bono, American singer, actor, and politician (b. 1935)
- January 11 – Ellis Rabb, American director and actor (b. 1930)
- January 12 – Phyllis Nelson, singer (b. 1950)
- January 15 – Junior Wells, American harmonica player (b. 1934)
- January 16 – Emil Sitka, American actor (b. 1914)
- January 18 – Benjamin Hoskins Paddock, American bank robber and con man, FBI Ten Most Wanted Fugitive (b. 1905)
- January 19 – Carl Perkins, American musician and guitarist (b. 1932)
- January 20 – Bobo Brazil, professional wrestler (b. 1924)
- January 21
  - Jack Lord, American actor (b. 1920)
  - Ralph C. Smith, United States Army officer (b. 1893)
- January 24 – Ira Colitz, American politician (b. 1915)
- January 26 – Ethelreda Leopold, American actress (b. 1914)
- January 29 – Joseph Alioto, American lawyer and politician, 36th Mayor of San Francisco (b. 1916)

=== February ===
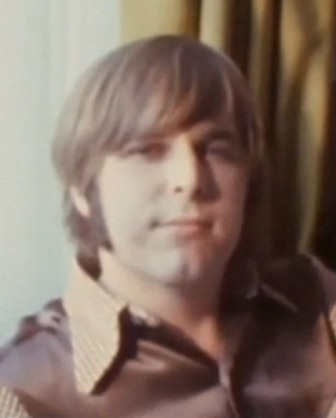
Carl Wilson

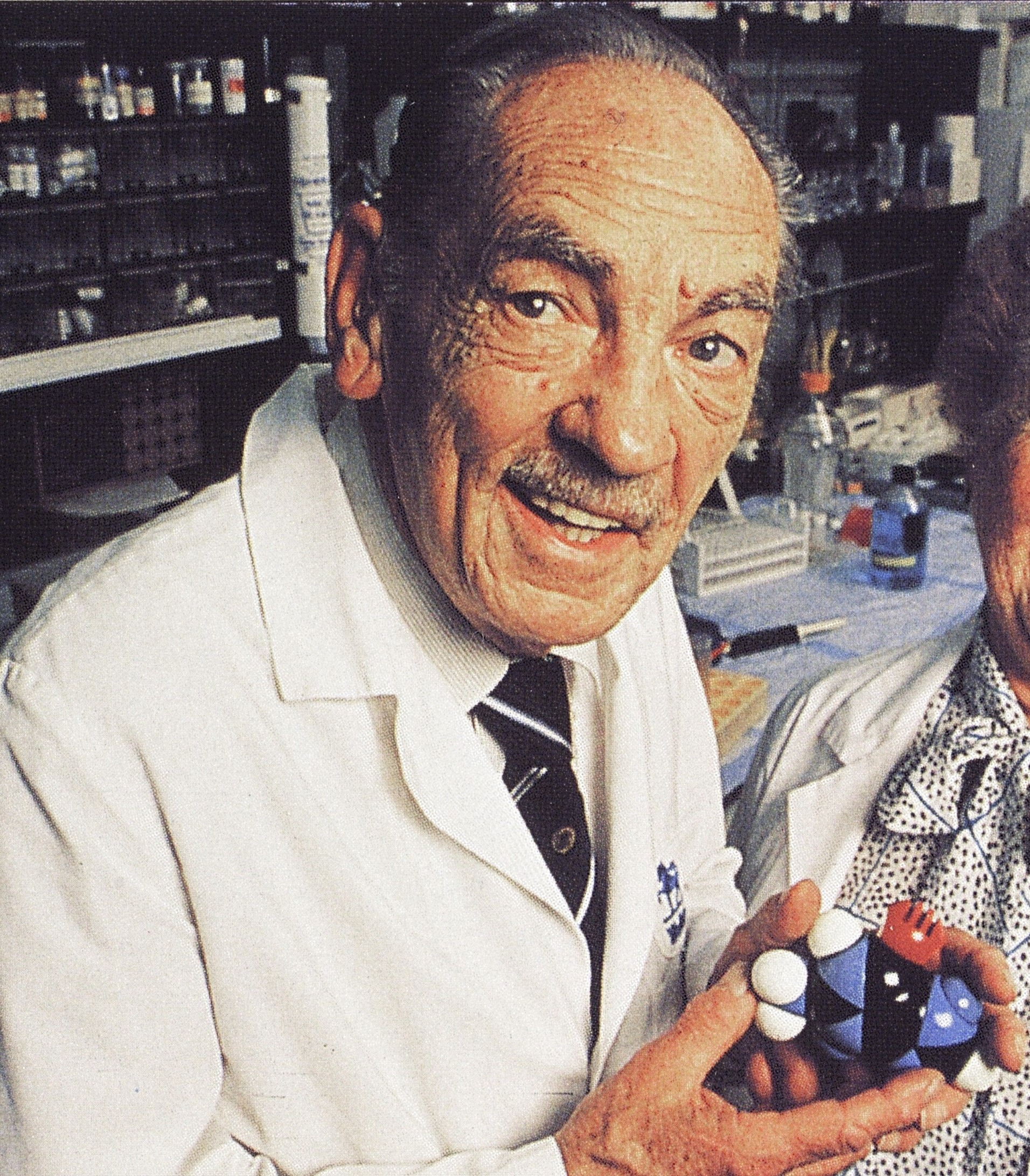
George H. Hitchings

- February 2 – Raymond Cattell, British-American psychologist (b. 1905 in the United Kingdom)
- February 3
  - Fat Pat, American rapper (b. 1970)
  - Karla Faye Tucker, convicted murderer (b. 1959)
- February 6 – Carl Wilson, American musician (b. 1946)
- February 7
  - Lawrence Sanders, American author (b. 1920)
  - Roger Nicholas Angleton, American murderer (b. 1942)
- February 10 – Buddy, notable canine (b. 1988)
- February 11 – Jonathan Hole, American actor (b. 1904)
- February 14 – Thomas McKimson, American animator (b. 1907)
- February 17 – Bob Merrill, American composer and screenwriter (b. 1921)
- February 18
  - Harry Caray, American television and radio broadcaster (b. 1914)
  - Scott O'Hara, American pornographic performer, author, poet, editor and publisher (b. 1961)
- February 19 – Grandpa Jones, American musician (b. 1913)
- February 22
  - Red Reeder, U.S. Army officer and author (b. 1902)
  - Abraham Alexander Ribicoff, American politician (b. 1910)
- February 23 – Philip Abbott, American actor (b. 1924)
- February 24 – Henny Youngman, British-born American comedian (b. 1906)
- February 26 – Theodore Schultz, American economist (b. 1902)
- February 27
  - George H. Hitchings, American scientist (b. 1905)
  - J. T. Walsh, American actor (b. 1943)

=== March ===
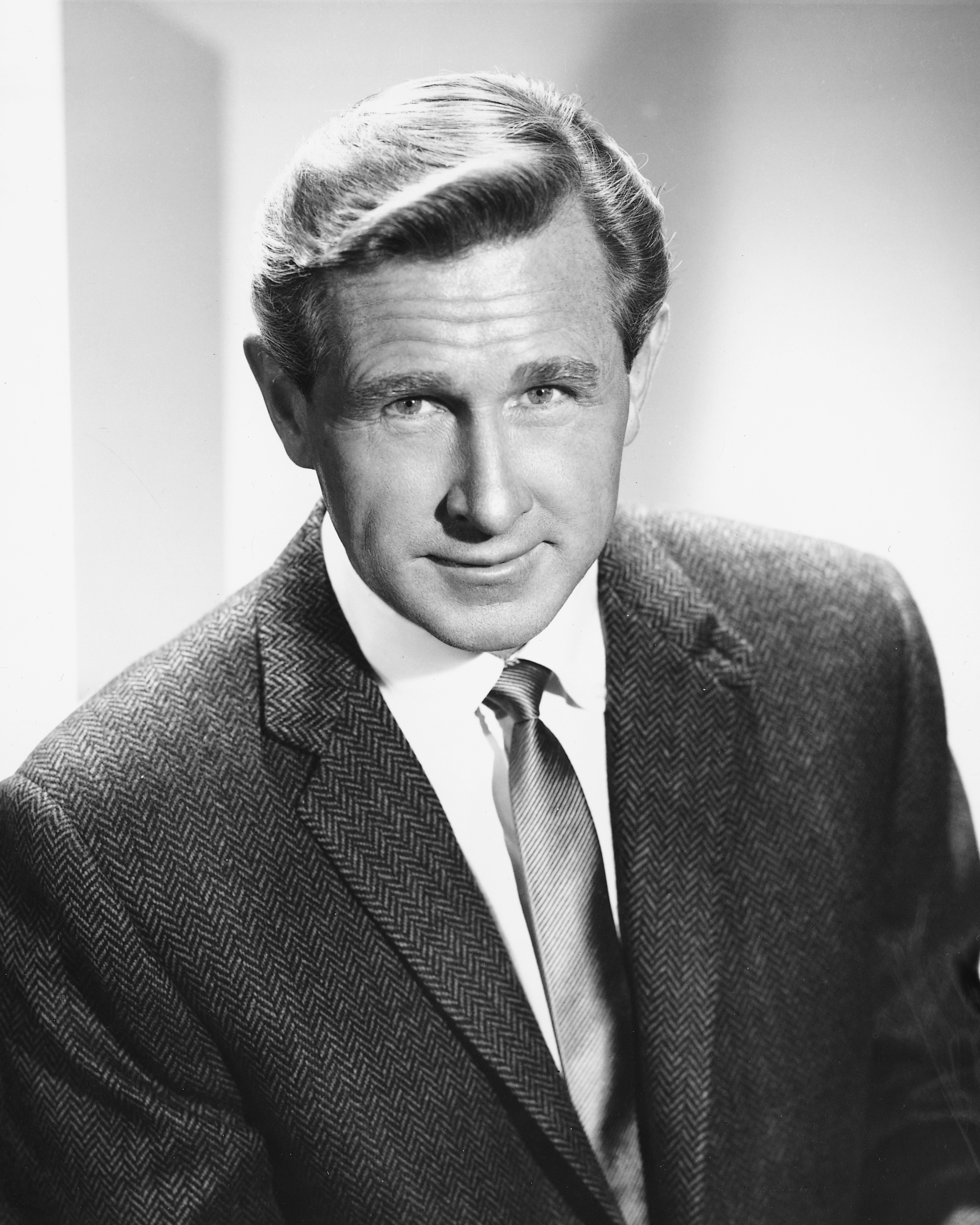
Lloyd Bridges

- March 1
  - Archie Goodwin, American comic book writer and artist (b. 1937)
  - Garner E. Shriver, American politician (b. 1912)
- March 2
  - Slick Castleman, American Major League Baseball player (b. 1913)
  - Henry Steele Commager, American historian, pneumonia (b. 1902)
  - Robert A. Grant, American judge (b. 1905)
  - Darcy O'Brien, American author (b. 1939)
  - Marzette Watts, American jazz tenor and soprano saxophonist (b. 1938)
- March 3
  - Janet Burston, American child actress, cancer (b. 1935)
  - Fred W. Friendly, American television journalist and executive (b. 1915)
  - Charles Franklin Phillips, American economist (b. 1910)
- March 4 – Jim Cullom, American gridiron football player (b. 1925)
- March 7 – Bernarr Rainbow, historian of music education, organist, and choir master, (b. 1914)
- March 8 – Ray Nitschke, American football player (b. 1936)
- March 10 – Lloyd Bridges, American actor (b. 1913)
- March 12 – Risen Star, American racehorse (b. 1985)
- March 15 – Benjamin Spock, American rower, pediatrician, and author (b. 1903)
- March 20 – George Howard, American jazz saxophone musician (b. 1956)
- March 29 – Kvitka Cisyk, American opera singer (b. 1953)
- March 31 – Bella Abzug, American lawyer, feminist activist, and politician (b. 1920)

=== April ===
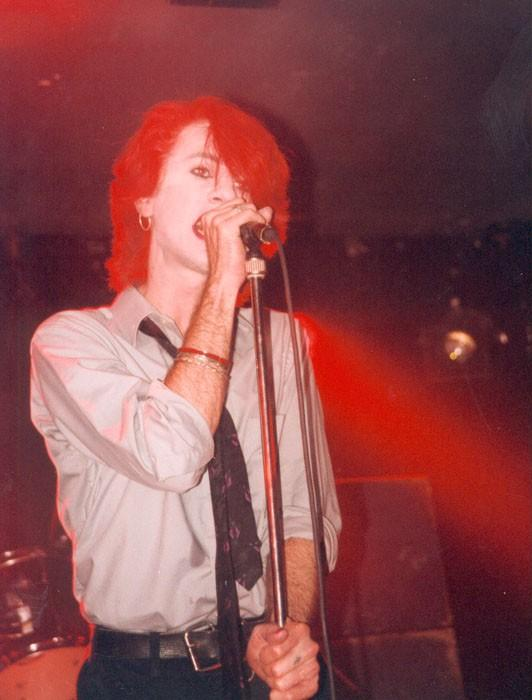
Rozz Williams

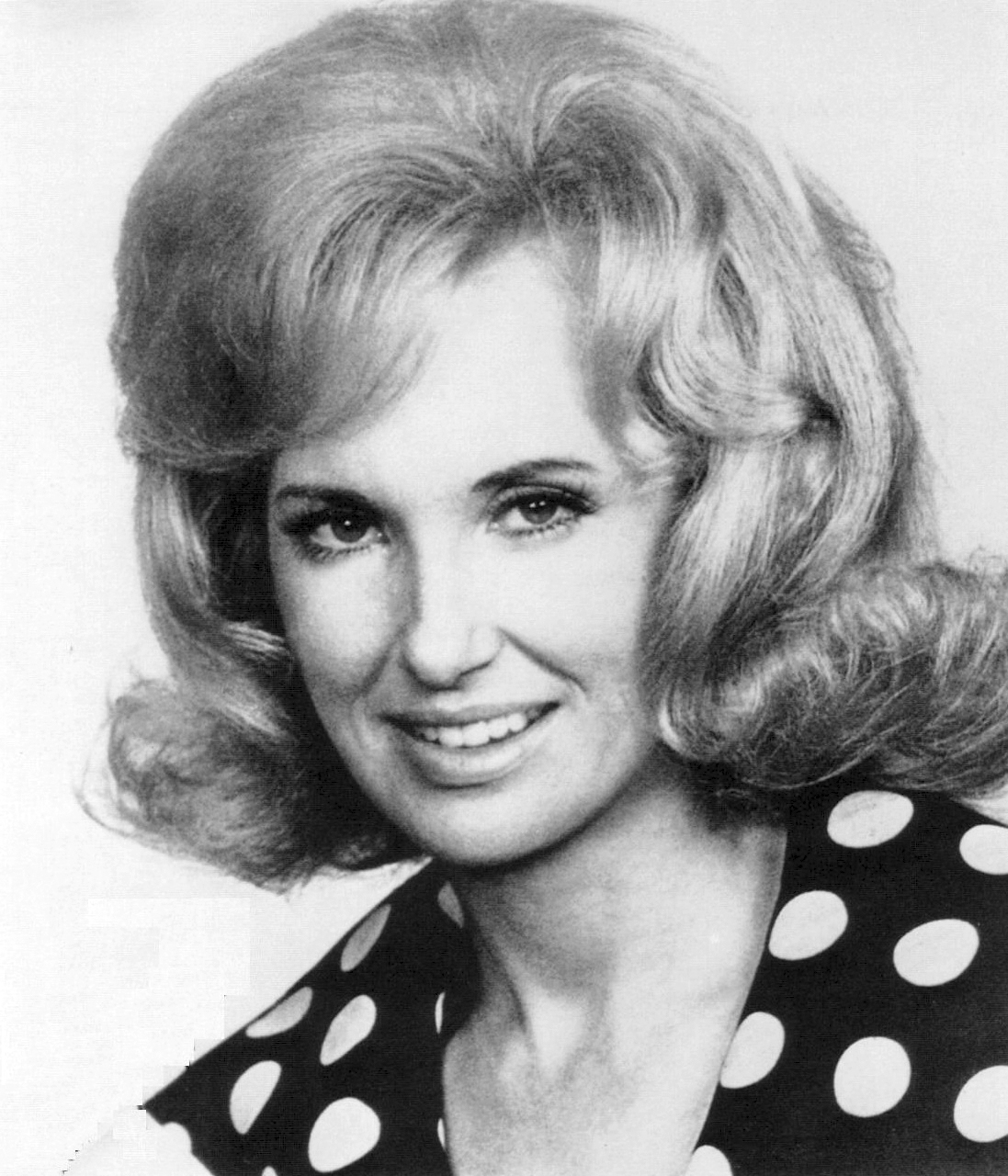
Tammy Wynette

- April 1
  - Gene Evans, American actor (b. 1922)
  - Rozz Williams, American singer (b. 1963)
- April 3 – Charles Lang, American cinematographer (b. 1901)
- April 6
  - Wendy O. Williams, American singer (b. 1949)
  - Tammy Wynette, American singer (b. 1942)
- April 11
  - Doris Tetzlaff, American female professional baseball player (b. 1921)
  - Rodney Harvey, American actor and model (b. 1967)
- April 15 – Rose Maddox, American singer (b. 1925)
- April 17 – Linda McCartney, American photographer and musician (b. 1941)
- April 21
  - Peter Lind Hayes, American entertainer (b. 1915)
  - Irene Vernon, American actress (b. 1922)
- April 22 – Shalimar Seiuli, American dancer and public figure (b. 1976)
- April 23
  - Hattie Moseley Austin, African American restaurateur (b. c.1900)
  - James Earl Ray, assassin of Martin Luther King Jr. (b. 1928)
- April 25 – Wright Morris, American photographer and writer (b. 1910)
- April 27 – Carlos Castaneda, American anthropologist and author (b. 1925)

=== May ===
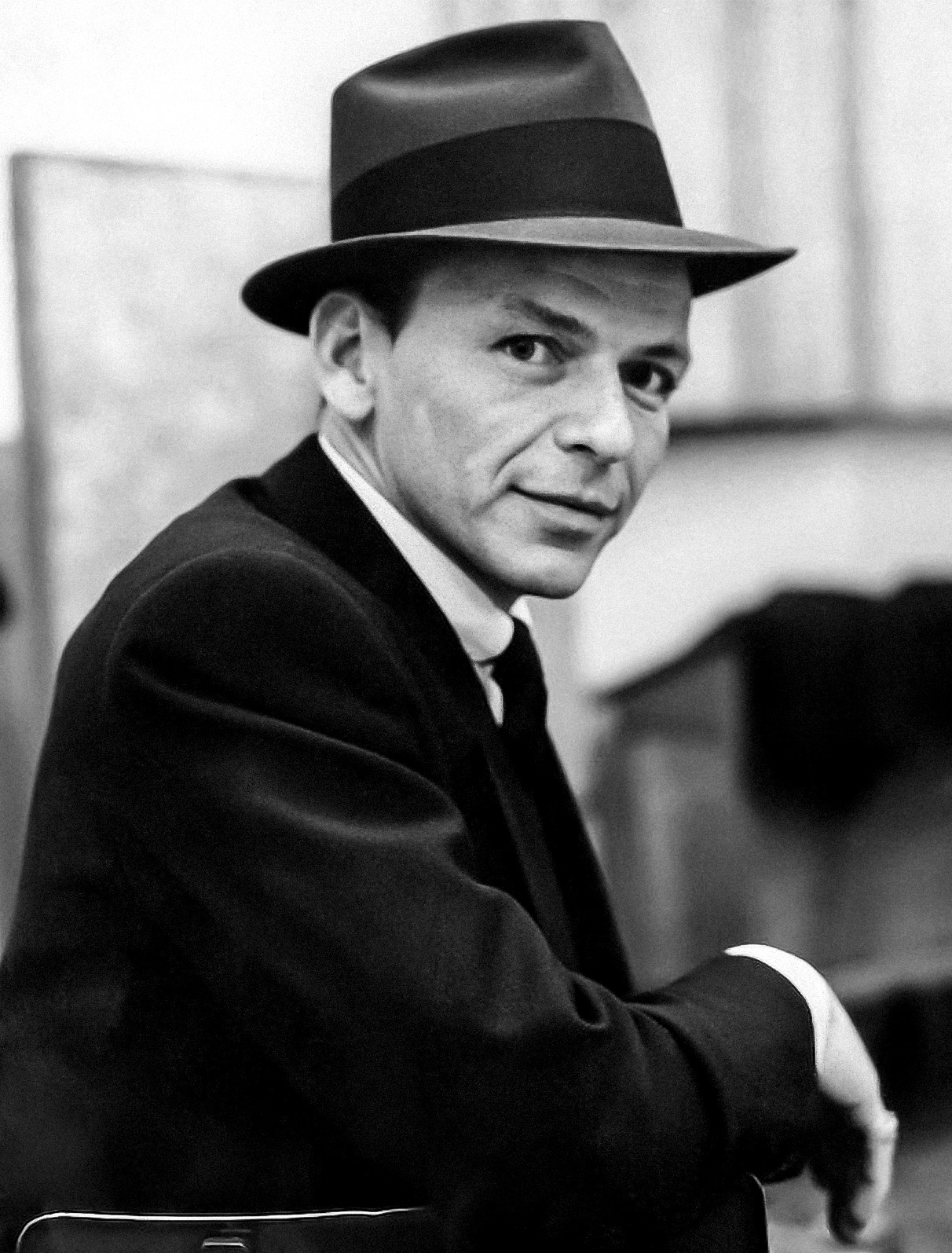
Frank Sinatra

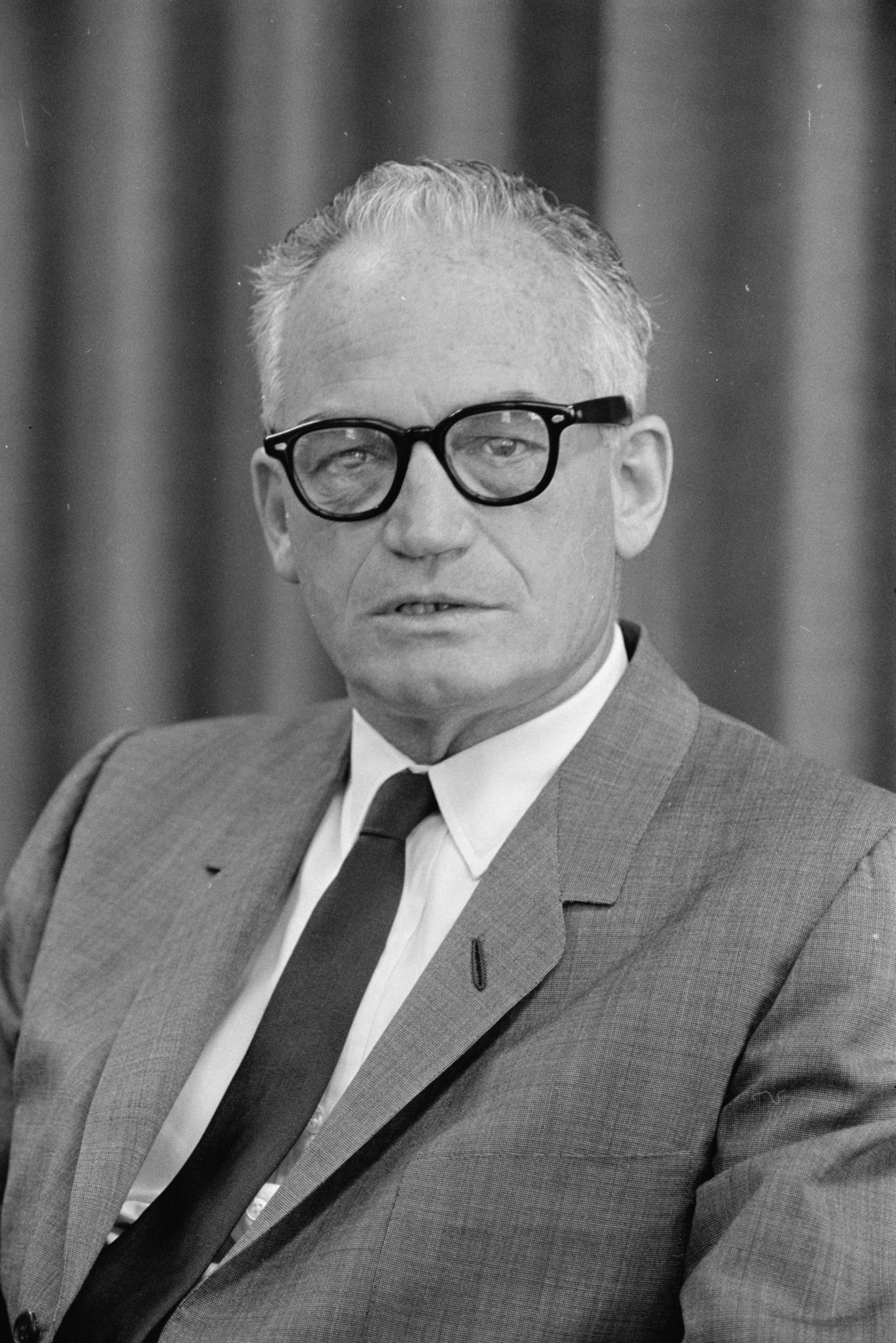
Barry Goldwater

- May 1 – Eldridge Cleaver, American political activist and writer (b. 1935)
- May 2
  - Maidie Norman, American actress (b. 1912)
  - Gene Raymond, American actor (b. 1908)
- May 7 – Eddie Rabbitt, American musician (b. 1941)
- May 9
  - Alice Faye, American entertainer (b. 1915)
  - Rommie Loudd, American football player and coach (b. 1933)
- May 14
  - Marjory Stoneman Douglas, American conservationist and writer (b. 1890)
  - Frank Sinatra, singer and actor (b. 1915)
- May 15 – Earl Manigault, American street basketball player (b. 1944)
- May 21 – Douglas Fowley, American actor (b. 1911)
- May 22 – John Derek, American actor and film director (b. 1926)
- May 28 – Phil Hartman, Canadian-born American actor, comedian, and murder victim (b. 1948)
- May 29
  - Orlando Anderson, American criminal, prime suspect in the Murder of Tupac Shakur (b. 1974)
  - Barry Goldwater, American politician (b. 1909)

=== June ===
- June 1
  - Junkyard Dog, American professional wrestler (b. 1952)
  - Darwin Joston, actor (b. 1937)
- June 2
  - Dorothy Stickney, American actress (b. 1896)
  - Helen Carter, American country music singer (b. 1927)
- June 4 – Shirley Povich, American sports columnist (b. 1905)
- June 5
  - Jeanette Nolan, American actress (b. 1911)
  - Sam Yorty, American politician, Los Angeles' 37th mayor (1961–1973) (b. 1909).
- June 9 – Lois Mailou Jones, African-American artist (b. 1905)
- June 12 – Theresa Merritt, American actress (b. 1924)
- June 23 – Maureen O'Sullivan, Irish-American actress (b. 1911 in Ireland)
- June 28 – Marion Eugene Carl, American fighter pilot (b. 1915)

=== July ===
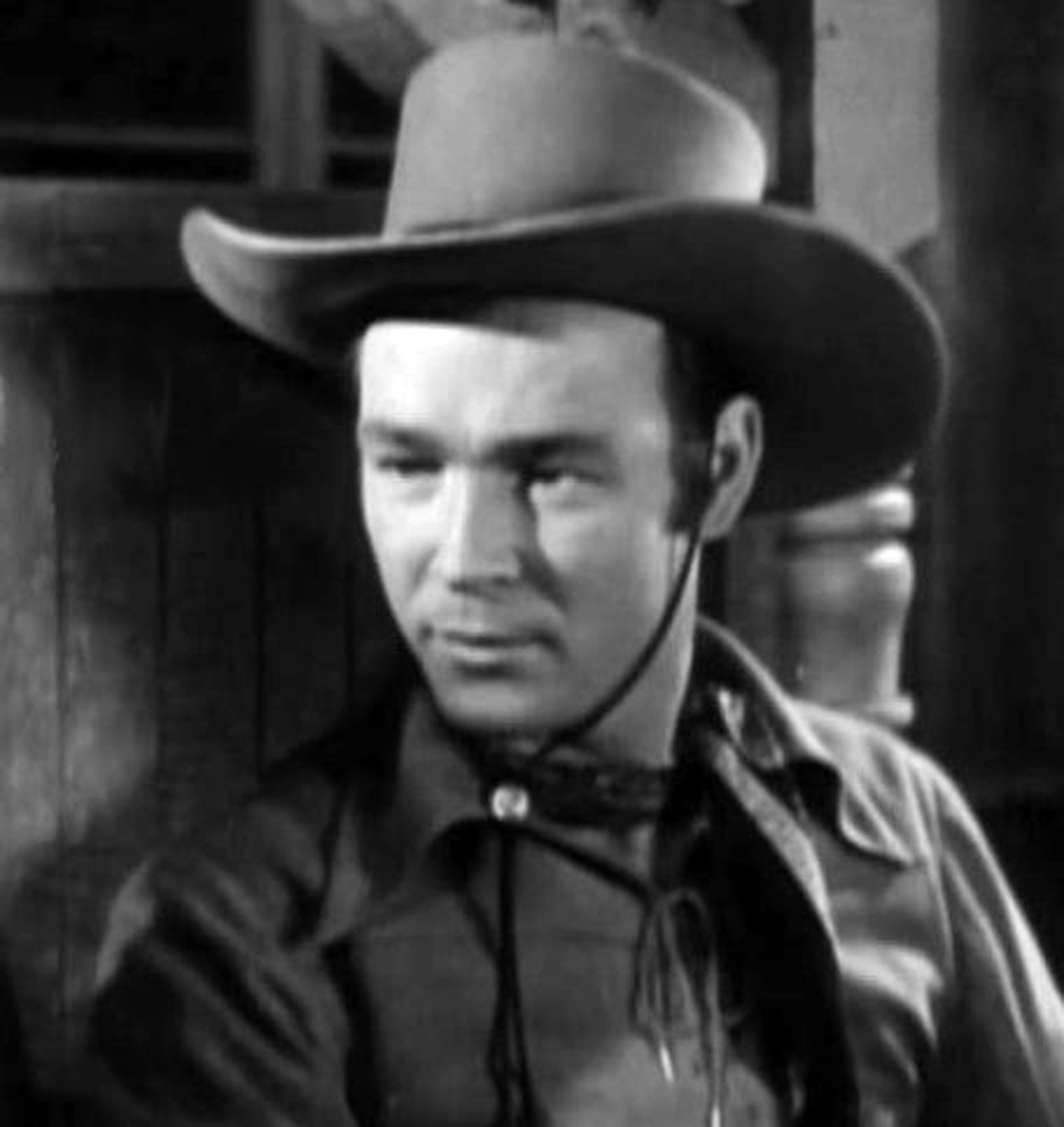
Roy Rogers

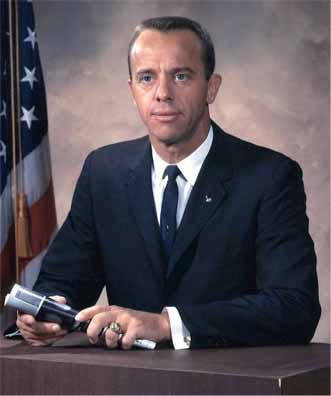
Alan Shepard

- July 2 – Kay Thompson, American author and actress (b. 1909)
- July 3 – Danielle Bunten Berry, American software developer (b. 1949)
- July 4 – Gregg Burge, American tap dancer and choreographer (b. 1957)
- July 5 – Sid Luckman, American football player (b. 1916)
- July 6 – Roy Rogers, American singer and actor (b. 1911)
- July 17
  - Robert Cornog, American physicist and engineer (b. 1912)
  - Joseph Maher, Irish-born American actor (b. 1933)
- July 19 – Elmer Valo, Slovak baseball player (b. 1921)
- July 21
  - Alan Shepard, American astronaut (b. 1923)
  - Robert Young, American actor (b. 1907)
- July 22 – Don Dunphy, American television and radio sports announcer (b. 1908)
- July 27 – Binnie Barnes, British-born American actress (b. 1903)
- July 28 – Harvie Branscomb, American university president (b. 1894)
- July 29 – Jerome Robbins, American choreographer and director (b. 1918)
- July 30 – Buffalo Bob Smith, American children's television host (b. 1917)

=== August ===
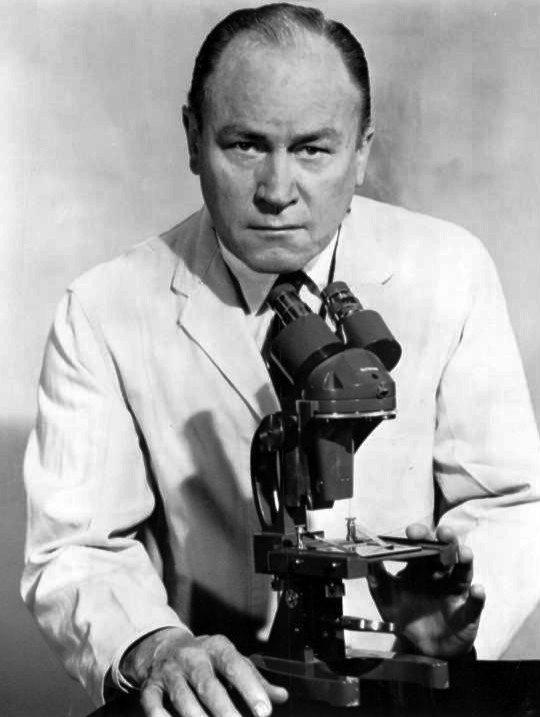
E. G. Marshall

- August 2 – Shari Lewis, American ventriloquist (b. 1933)
- August 6 – André Weil, French mathematician (b. 1906)
- August 9 – Frankie Ruiz, American salsa singer and songwriter (b. 1958)
- August 16 – Phil Leeds, American actor (b. 1916)
- August 22 – Jack Briggs, American actor (b. 1920)
- August 24
  - Jerry Clower, American country comedian (b. 1926)
  - E. G. Marshall, American actor (b. 1914)
- August 25 – Lewis F. Powell Jr., American Supreme Court Justice (b. 1907)
- August 26
  - Wade Dominguez, American actor, model, singer, and dancer (b. 1966)
  - Frederick Reines, American physicist (b. 1918)
- August 28 – George Büchi, American chemist (b. 1921)

=== September ===
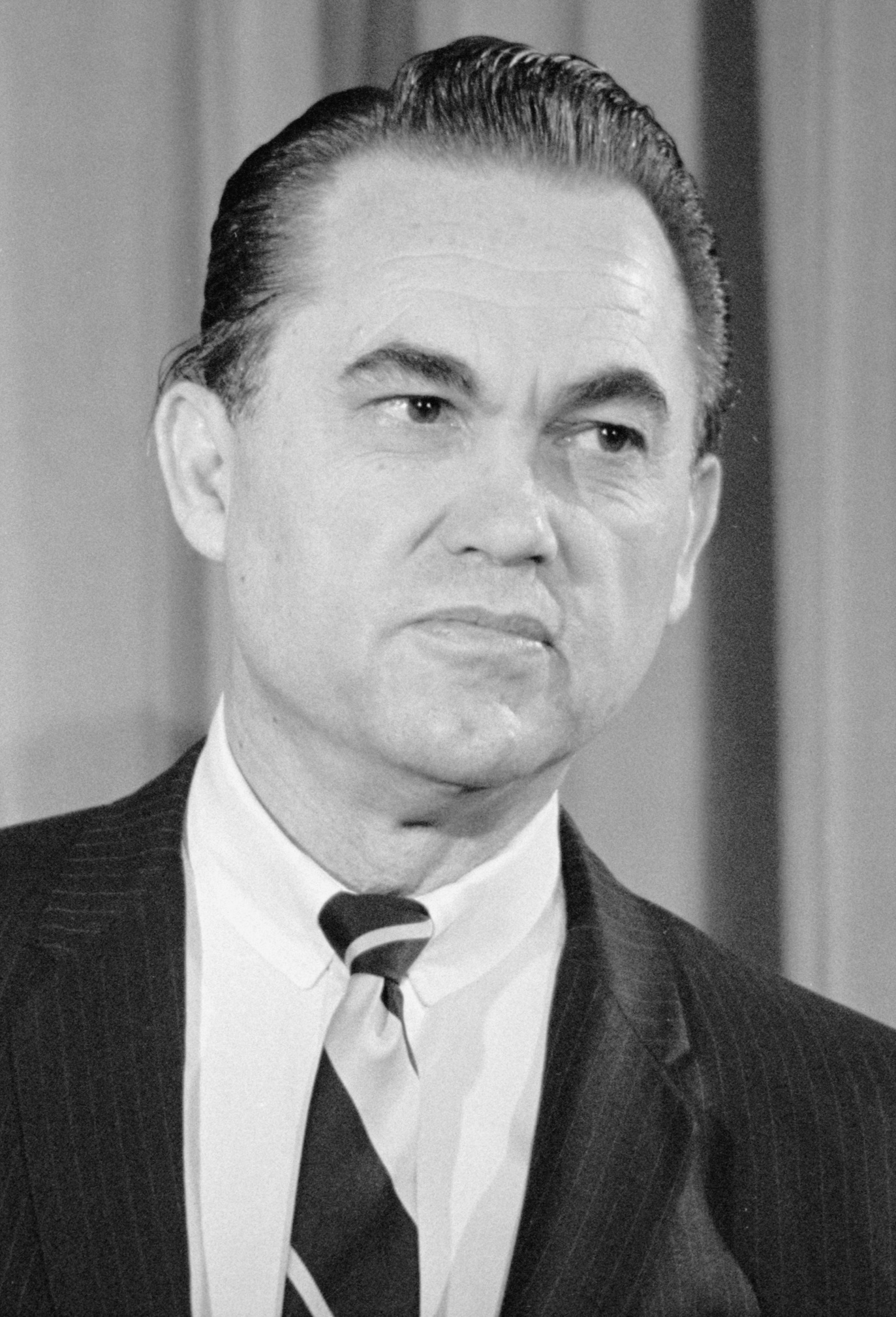
George Wallace

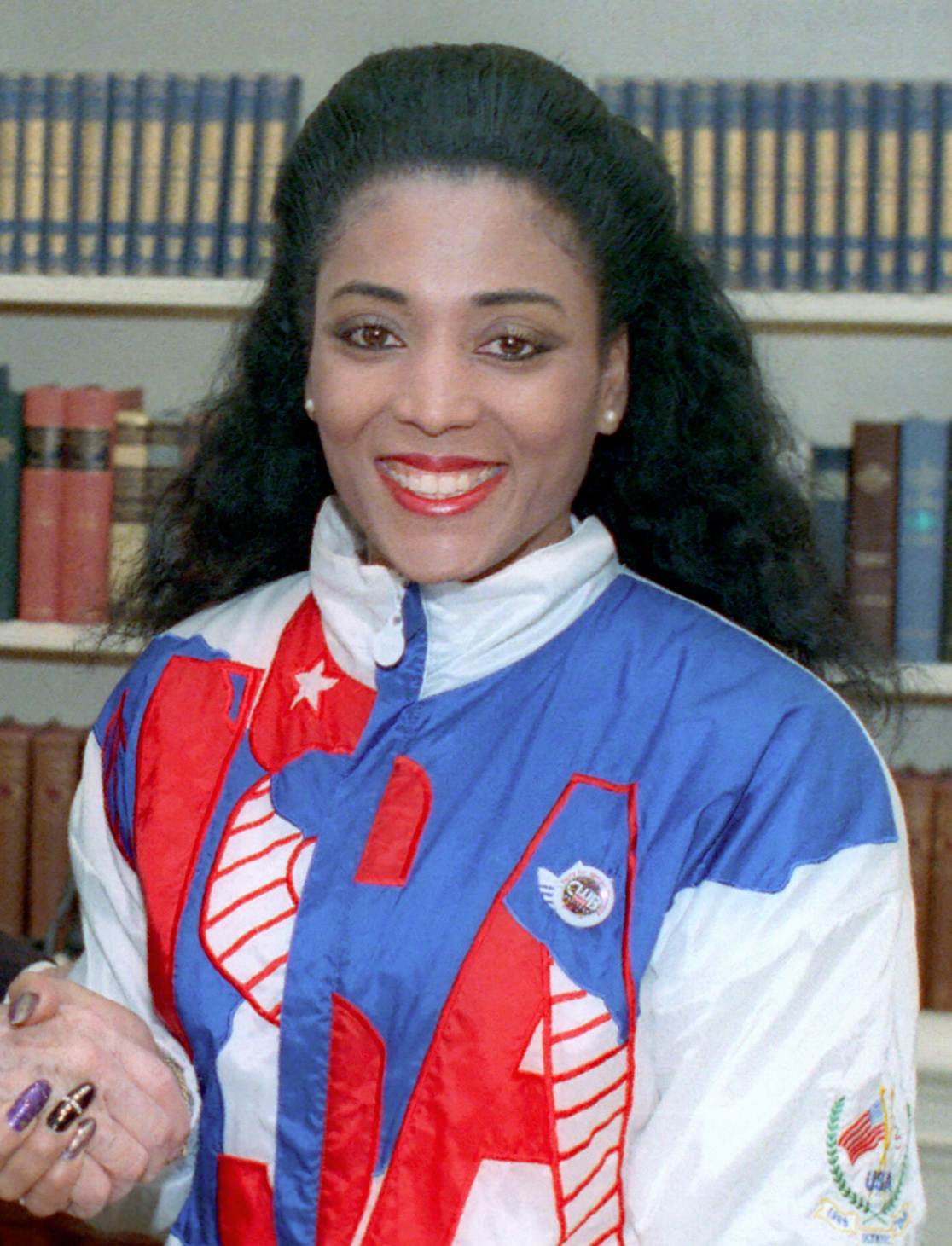
Florence Griffith Joyner

- September 1 – Cary Middlecoff, American golfer (b. 1921)
- September 2
  - Allen Drury, American writer (b. 1918)
  - Walter L. Morgan, American banker (b. 1898)
- September 5 – Leo Penn, American actor and director (b. 1921)
- September 8 – Leonid Kinskey, Russian-born actor (b. 1903)
- September 11 – Dane Clark, American actor (b. 1912)
- September 13 – George Wallace, American politician (b. 1919)
- September 14 – Johnny Adams, American singer (b. 1932)
- September 15 – Fred Alderman, American Olympic sprinter (b. 1905)
- September 20 – Muriel Humphrey Brown, American politician (b. 1912)
- September 21 – Florence Griffith Joyner, American runner (b. 1959)
- September 23 – Mary Frann, American actress (b. 1942)
- September 26 – Betty Carter, American jazz singer (b. 1929)
- September 27 – Doak Walker, American football player (b. 1927)
- September 29 – Herbert V. Prochnow, U.S. banker and author (b. 1897)
- September 30
  - Dan Quisenberry, American baseball player (b. 1953)
  - Robert Lewis Taylor, American author (b. 1912)

=== October ===
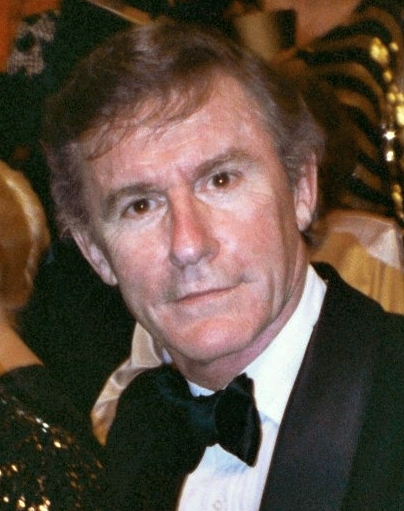
Roddy McDowall

- October 2 – Gene Autry, American actor, singer, and sports team owner (b. 1907)
- October 3 – Roddy McDowall, British-born American actor (b. 1928)
- October 6
  - Mark Belanger, American baseball player (b. 1944)
  - Ambrose Burke, Roman Catholic priest and educator (b. 1895)
- October 10
  - Clark Clifford, lawyer, political adviser, and 9th Secretary of Defense of the United States (b. 1906)
  - Marvin Gay Sr., American minister (b. 1914)
- October 11 – Richard Denning, American actor (b. 1914)
- October 12 – Matthew Shepard, American murder victim (b. 1976)
- October 14 – Frankie Yankovic, American musician (b. 1916)
- October 16 – Jon Postel, American Internet pioneer (b. 1943)
- October 24 – Mary Calderone, American physician, public health advocate (b. 1904)
- October 28 – James Goldman, American writer (b. 1927)

=== November ===
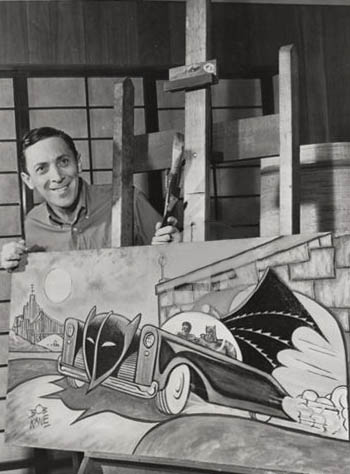
Bob Kane

- November 3
  - Bob Kane, American comic book creator (b. 1915)
  - Martha O'Driscoll, American film actress (b. 1922)
- November 7 – Luis Carlos Meyer, Colombian singer and songwriter (b. 1916)
- November 10 – Hal Newhouser, American baseball player (b. 1921)
- November 15
  - Stokely Carmichael, Trinidadian-American civil rights activist (b. 1941)
  - Elisabeth Owens, legal scholar (b. 1919)
- November 17
  - Weeb Ewbank, American football coach (b. 1907)
  - Kenneth McDuff, American serial killer (b. 1946)
  - Esther Rolle, American actress (b. 1920)
- November 19 – Alan J. Pakula, American film director (b. 1928)
- November 22 – Stu Ungar, American professional poker player (b. 1953)
- November 23 – Don Ray, American basketball player (b. 1921)
- November 25 – Flip Wilson, American actor and comedian (b. 1933)
- November 29 – Frank Latimore, American actor (b. 1925)
- November 30
  - Ad Liska, American baseball pitcher (b. 1906)
  - Margaret Walker, American poet (b. 1915)

=== December ===
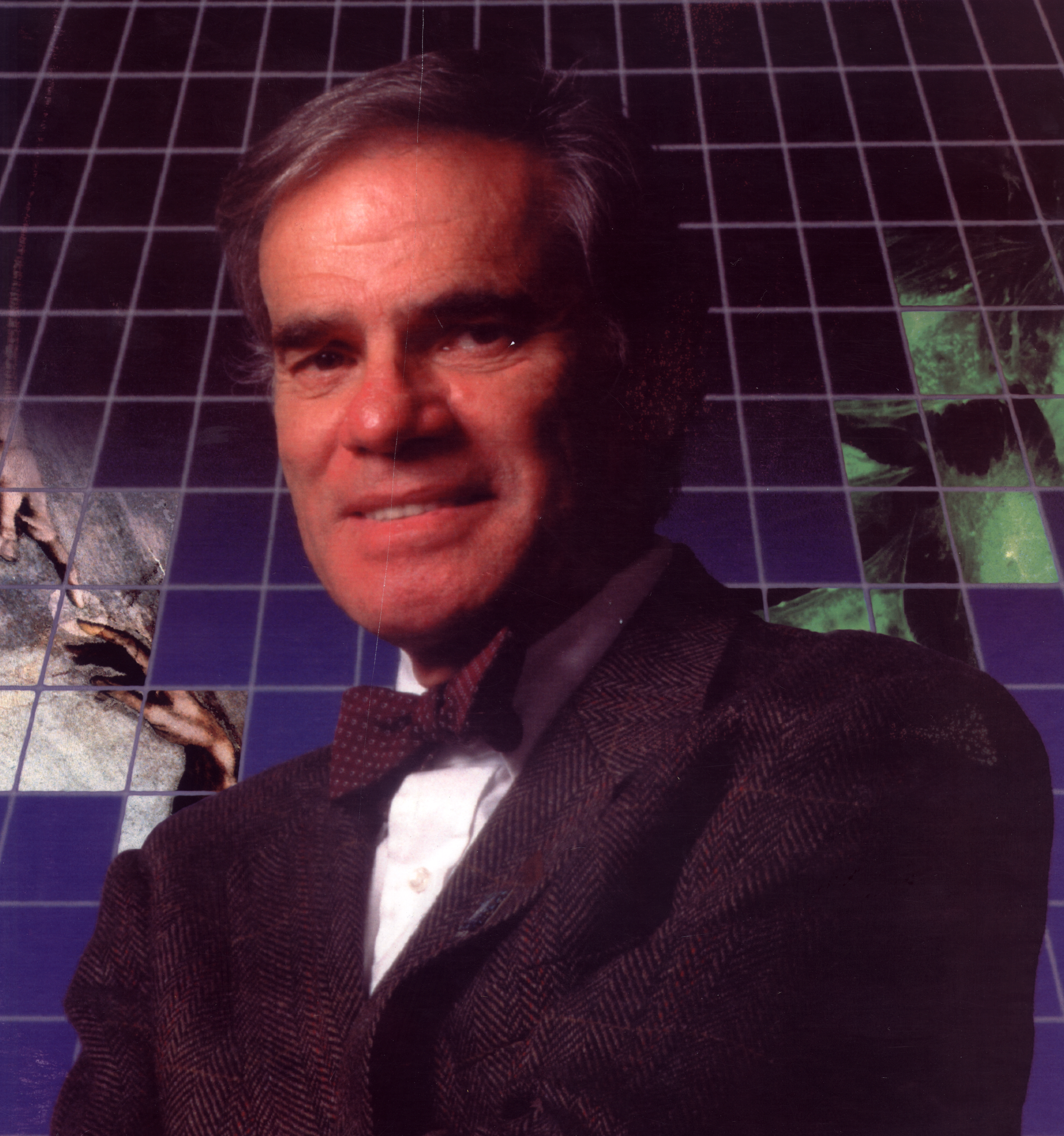
Martin Rodbell

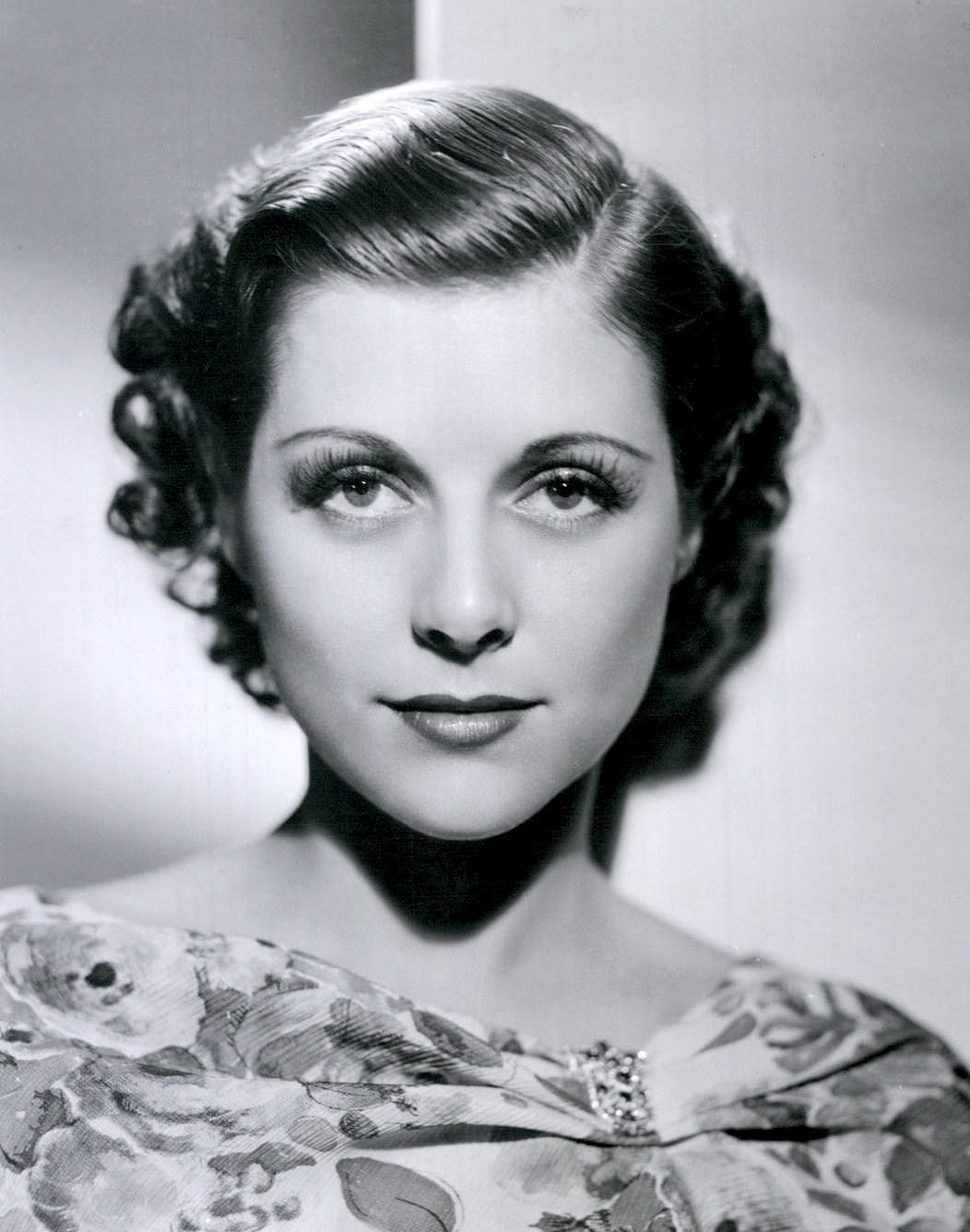
Irene Hervey

- December 1
  - Janet Lewis, American novelist and poet (b. 1899)
  - Freddie Young, American cinematographer (b. 1902)
- December 5 – Hazel Bishop, American chemist and inventor (b. 1906)
- December 6 – Michael Zaslow, American actor (b. 1942)
- December 7 – Martin Rodbell, American scientist (b. 1925)
- December 9 – Archie Moore, American professional boxer (b. 1916)
- December 11 – Lynn Strait, American musician (b. 1968)
- December 12
  - Lawton Chiles, American politician (b. 1930)
  - Orion, American singer (b. 1945)
  - Mo Udall, American politician (b. 1922)
- December 14
  - Norman Fell, American actor (b. 1924)
  - Annette Strauss, American philanthropist and politician (b. 1924)
- December 15 – Brady Boone, American professional wrestler (b. 1958)
- December 16 – William Gaddis, American writer (b. 1922)
- December 17 – Claudia Benton, Peruvian-born child psychologist (b. 1959)
- December 19 – Gordon Gunter, American marine biologist and fisheries scientist (b. 1909)
- December 20 – Irene Hervey, American actress (b. 1909)
- December 22 – Virginia Graham, American talk-show host (b. 1912)
- December 23
  - David Manners, Canadian-American actor (b. 1900)
  - Michelle Thomas, American actress (b. 1968)
- December 25 – Richard Paul, American actor (b. 1940)
- December 26
  - Hurd Hatfield, American actor (b. 1917)
  - Robert Rosen, American biologist (b. 1934)
  - William Frankfather, American actor (b. 1944)

== See also ==
- 1998 in American soccer
- 1998 in American television
- List of American films of 1998
- Timeline of United States history (1990–2009)
