= 1963 in the United States =

- Decades: 1940s; 1950s; 1960s; 1970s; 1980s
- See also: History of the United States (1945–1964); Timeline of United States history (1950–1969); List of years in the United States

Events from the year 1963 in the United States.

== Incumbents ==
=== Federal government ===
- President:

John F. Kennedy (D-Massachusetts) (until November 22)
Lyndon B. Johnson (D-Texas) (starting November 22)

- Vice President:

Lyndon B. Johnson (D-Texas) (until November 22)
vacant (starting November 22)

- Chief Justice: Earl Warren (California)
- Speaker of the House of Representatives: John William McCormack (D-Massachusetts)
- Senate Majority Leader: Mike Mansfield (D-Montana)
- Congress: 87th (until January 3), 88th (starting January 3)

==== State governments ====
Governors and lieutenant governors

=== Governors ===
- Governor of Alabama: John M. Patterson (Democratic) (until January 14), George Wallace (Democratic) (starting January 14)
- Governor of Alaska: William A. Egan (Democratic)
- Governor of Arizona: Paul Fannin (Republican)
- Governor of Arkansas: Orval Faubus (Democratic)
- Governor of California: Pat Brown (Democratic)
- Governor of Colorado: Stephen L. R. McNichols (Democratic) (until January 8), John Arthur Love (Republican) (starting January 8)
- Governor of Connecticut: John N. Dempsey (Democratic)
- Governor of Delaware: Elbert N. Carvel (Democratic)
- Governor of Florida: C. Farris Bryant (Democratic)
- Governor of Georgia: Ernest Vandiver (Democratic) (until January 15), Carl E. Sanders (Democratic) (starting January 15)
- Governor of Hawaii: John A. Burns (Democratic)
- Governor of Idaho: Robert E. Smylie (Republican)
- Governor of Illinois: Otto Kerner Jr. (Democratic)
- Governor of Indiana: Matthew E. Welsh (Democratic)
- Governor of Iowa: Norman A. Erbe (Republican) (until January 17), Harold E. Hughes (Democratic) (starting January 17)
- Governor of Kansas: John Anderson Jr. (Republican)
- Governor of Kentucky: Bert T. Combs (Democratic) (until December 10), Edward T. Breathitt (Democratic) (starting December 10)
- Governor of Louisiana: Jimmie H. Davis (Democratic)
- Governor of Maine: John H. Reed (Republican)
- Governor of Maryland: J. Millard Tawes (Democratic)
- Governor of Massachusetts: John A. Volpe (Republican) (until January 3), Endicott Peabody (Democratic) (starting January 3)
- Governor of Michigan: John Swainson (Democratic) (until January 1), George W. Romney (Republican) (starting January 1)
- Governor of Minnesota: Elmer L. Andersen (Republican) (until March 25), Karl F. Rolvaag (Democratic) (starting March 25)
- Governor of Mississippi: Ross R. Barnett (Democratic)
- Governor of Missouri: John M. Dalton (Democratic)
- Governor of Montana: Tim M. Babcock (Republican)
- Governor of Nebraska: Frank B. Morrison (Democratic)
- Governor of Nevada: Grant Sawyer (Democratic)
- Governor of New Hampshire: Wesley Powell (Republican) (until January 3), John W. King (Democratic) (starting January 3)
- Governor of New Jersey: Richard J. Hughes (Democratic)
- Governor of New Mexico: Tom Bolack (Republican) (until January 1), Jack M. Campbell (Democratic) (starting January 1)
- Governor of New York: Nelson Rockefeller (Republican)
- Governor of North Carolina: Terry Sanford (Democratic)
- Governor of North Dakota: William L. Guy (Democratic)
- Governor of Ohio: Michael DiSalle (Democratic) (until January 14), Jim Rhodes (Republican) (starting January 14)
- Governor of Oklahoma:
  - until January 6: J. Howard Edmondson (Democratic)
  - January 6-14: George Nigh (Democratic)
  - starting January 14: Henry Bellmon (Republican)
- Governor of Oregon: Mark Hatfield (Republican)
- Governor of Pennsylvania: David L. Lawrence (Democratic) (until January 15), William Scranton (Republican) (starting January 15)
- Governor of Rhode Island: John A. Notte Jr. (Democratic) (until January 1), John Chafee (Republican) (starting January 1)
- Governor of South Carolina: Ernest Hollings (Democratic) (until January 15), Donald S. Russell (Democratic) (starting January 15)
- Governor of South Dakota: Archie M. Gubbrud (Republican)
- Governor of Tennessee: Buford Ellington (Democratic) (until January 15), Frank G. Clement (Democratic) (starting January 15)
- Governor of Texas: Price Daniel (Democratic) (until January 15), John Connally (Democratic) (starting January 15)
- Governor of Utah: George Dewey Clyde (Republican)
- Governor of Vermont: F. Ray Keyser Jr. (Republican) (until January 10), Philip H. Hoff (Democratic) (starting January 10)
- Governor of Virginia: Albertis S. Harrison Jr. (Democratic)
- Governor of Washington: Albert D. Rosellini (Democratic)
- Governor of West Virginia: William Wallace Barron (Democratic)
- Governor of Wisconsin: Gaylord A. Nelson (Democratic) (until January 7), John W. Reynolds Jr. (Democratic) (starting January 7)
- Governor of Wyoming: Jack R. Gage (Democratic) (until January 7), Clifford P. Hansen (Republican) (starting January 7)

=== Lieutenant governors ===
- Lieutenant Governor of Alabama: Albert B. Boutwell (Democratic) (until January 14), James B. Allen (Democratic) (starting January 14)
- Lieutenant Governor of Alaska: Hugh Wade (Democratic)
- Lieutenant Governor of Arkansas: Nathan Green Gordon (Democratic)
- Lieutenant Governor of California: Glenn Malcolm Anderson (Democratic)
- Lieutenant Governor of Colorado: Robert Lee Knous (Democratic)
- Lieutenant Governor of Connecticut: Anthony J. Armentano (Democratic) (until month and day unknown), Samuel J. Tedesco (Democratic) (starting month and day unknown)
- Lieutenant Governor of Delaware: Eugene Lammot (Democratic)
- Lieutenant Governor of Georgia: Garland T. Byrd (Democratic) (until January 15), Peter Zack Geer (Democratic) (starting January 15)
- Lieutenant Governor of Hawaii: William S. Richardson (Democratic)
- Lieutenant Governor of Idaho: William Drevlow (Democratic)
- Lieutenant Governor of Illinois: Samuel H. Shapiro (Democratic)
- Lieutenant Governor of Indiana: Richard O. Ristine (Republican)
- Lieutenant Governor of Iowa: W. L. Mooty (Democratic)
- Lieutenant Governor of Kansas: Harold H. Chase (Republican)
- Lieutenant Governor of Kentucky: Wilson W. Wyatt (Democratic) (until month and day unknown), Harry Lee Waterfield (Democratic) (starting month and day unknown)
- Lieutenant Governor of Louisiana: C. C. Aycock (Democratic)
- Lieutenant Governor of Massachusetts: Edward F. McLaughlin Jr. (Democratic) (until month and day unknown), Francis X. Bellotti (Democratic) (starting month and day unknown)
- Lieutenant Governor of Michigan: T. John Lesinski (Democratic)
- Lieutenant Governor of Minnesota: Karl Rolvaag (Democratic) (until month and day unknown), Alexander M. Keith (Democratic) (starting month and day unknown)
- Lieutenant Governor of Mississippi: Paul B. Johnson Jr. (Democratic)
- Lieutenant Governor of Missouri: Hilary A. Bush (Democratic)
- Lieutenant Governor of Montana: David F. James (Democratic)
- Lieutenant Governor of Nebraska: Dwight Burney (Republican)
- Lieutenant Governor of Nevada: Maude Frazier (Democratic) (until January 1), Paul Laxalt (Republican) (starting January 1)
- Lieutenant Governor of New Mexico: vacant (until January 1), Mack Easley (Democratic) (starting January 1)
- Lieutenant Governor of New York: Malcolm Wilson (Republican)
- Lieutenant Governor of North Carolina: vacant
- Lieutenant Governor of North Dakota: Orville W. Hagen (Republican) (until month and day unknown), Frank A. Wenstrom (Republican) (starting month and day unknown)
- Lieutenant Governor of Ohio: John W. Donahey (Democratic) (until January 14), John William Brown (Republican) (starting January 14)
- Lieutenant Governor of Oklahoma: George Nigh (Democratic) (until January 6), Leo Winters (Democratic) (starting January 6)
- Lieutenant Governor of Pennsylvania: John Morgan Davis (Democratic) (until January 15), Raymond P. Shafer (Republican) (starting January 15)
- Lieutenant Governor of Rhode Island: Edward P. Gallogly (Democratic)
- Lieutenant Governor of South Carolina: Burnet R. Maybank Jr. (Democratic) (until January 15), Robert Evander McNair (Democratic) (starting January 15)
- Lieutenant Governor of South Dakota: Nils Boe (Republican)
- Lieutenant Governor of Tennessee: vacant (until month and day unknown), James L. Bomar Jr. (Democratic) (starting month and day unknown)
- Lieutenant Governor of Texas: vacant (until January 15), Preston Smith (Democratic) (starting January 15)
- Lieutenant Governor of Vermont: Ralph A. Foote (Republican)
- Lieutenant Governor of Virginia: Mills E. Godwin Jr. (Democratic)
- Lieutenant Governor of Washington: John Cherberg (Democratic)
- Lieutenant Governor of Wisconsin: Warren P. Knowles (Republican) (until January 7), Jack B. Olson (Republican) (starting January 7)

== Events ==
=== January ===
- January 8 – Leonardo da Vinci's Mona Lisa is exhibited in the United States for the only time, being unveiled at the National Gallery of Art in Washington, D.C.
- January 14 – George Wallace becomes governor of Alabama. In his inaugural speech, he defiantly proclaims "segregation now, segregation tomorrow, and segregation forever!"
- January 28 – African American student Harvey Gantt enters Clemson University in South Carolina, the last U.S. state to hold out against racial integration.

=== February ===
- February 8 – Travel, financial and commercial transactions by United States citizens to Cuba are made illegal by the John F. Kennedy Administration.
- February 11 – The CIA's Domestic Operations Division is created.
- February 12 – Northwest Orient Airlines Flight 705 crashes in the Florida Everglades, killing everyone aboard.
- February 19 – The publication of Betty Friedan's The Feminine Mystique launches the reawakening of the Women's Movement in the United States as women's organizations and consciousness-raising groups spread.
- February 28 – Dorothy Schiff resigns from the New York Newspaper Publisher's Association, feeling that the city needs at least one paper. Her paper, the New York Post, resumes publication on March 4.

=== March ===
- March – Iron Man debuts in Marvel Comics's Tales of Suspense #39, cover-dated this month.
- March 5 – In Camden, Tennessee, country music star Patsy Cline (Virginia Patterson Hensley) is killed in a plane crash along with fellow performers Hawkshaw Hawkins, Cowboy Copas, and Cline's manager and pilot Randy Hughes, while returning from a benefit performance in Kansas City, Kansas for country radio disc jockey "Cactus" Jack Call.
- March 18 – Gideon v. Wainwright: The Supreme Court rules that state courts are required to provide counsel in criminal cases for defendants who cannot afford to pay their own attorneys.
- March 21 – The Alcatraz Federal Penitentiary on Alcatraz Island in San Francisco Bay closes; the last 27 prisoners are transferred elsewhere at the order of Attorney General Robert F. Kennedy.
- March 31 – The 1962–63 New York City newspaper strike ends after 114 days.

=== April ===
- April 1 – The long-running soap opera General Hospital debuts on ABC Televisions.
- April 3 – Southern Christian Leadership Conference volunteers kick off the Birmingham campaign against racial segregation with a sit-in.
- April 6 – The Kingsmen record their influential cover of "Louie Louie" in Portland, Oregon, released in June.
- April 8 – The 35th Academy Awards ceremony, hosted by Frank Sinatra, is held at Santa Monica Civic Auditorium. David Lean's Lawrence of Arabia wins and receives the most respective awards and nominations with seven and ten, winning Best Picture and Lean's second Best Director win.
- April 10 – The U.S. nuclear submarine Thresher sinks 220 mi (190 nmi; 350 km) east of Cape Cod; all 129 aboard (112 crewmen plus yard personnel) die.
- April 12 – Martin Luther King Jr., Ralph Abernathy, Fred Shuttlesworth and others are arrested in a Birmingham protest for "parading without a permit".
- April 16 – Martin Luther King Jr. issues his Letter from Birmingham Jail.
- April 20 – Martin Luther King Jr. posts bail and begins to plan more demonstrations (the Children's Crusade).

=== May ===
- May 1 – The Coca-Cola Company debuts its first diet drink, TaB cola.
- May 2 – Thousands of African Americans, many of them children, are arrested while protesting segregation in Birmingham, Alabama. Public Safety Commissioner Eugene "Bull" Connor later unleashes fire hoses and police dogs on the demonstrators.
- May 8 – Dr. No, the first James Bond film, is shown in U.S. theaters.
- May 15 – Mercury program: NASA launches Gordon Cooper on Mercury 9, the last mission (on June 12 NASA Administrator James E. Webb tells Congress the program is complete).
- May 27 – The Freewheelin' Bob Dylan, singer-songwriter Bob Dylan's second studio album, and most influential, is released by Columbia Records.

=== June ===
- June 3 – Huế chemical attacks: Members of the Army of the Republic of Vietnam pour chemicals on the heads of Buddhist protesters. The U.S. threatens to cut off aid to Ngo Dinh Diem's regime.
- June 4 – President John F. Kennedy signs Executive Order 11110.
- June 10
  - President John F. Kennedy delivers "A Strategy of Peace" speech at the American University in Washington, D.C., outlining a road map for the complete disarmament of nuclear weapons and world peace.
  - The University of Central Florida is established by the Florida legislature.
- June 11
  - Alabama Governor George Wallace stands in the door of the University of Alabama to protest against integration, before stepping aside and allowing African Americans James Hood and Vivian Malone to enroll.
  - President John F. Kennedy delivers a historic Civil Rights Address, in which he promises a Civil Rights Bill, and asks for "the kind of equality of treatment that we would want for ourselves."
- June 12
  - Medgar Evers is assassinated in Jackson, Mississippi. His killer, Byron De La Beckwith, is convicted in 1994.
  - The film Cleopatra, starring Elizabeth Taylor, Rex Harrison and Richard Burton, is released in the United States.
- June 13 – The cancellation of Mercury 10 effectively ends the Mercury program of U.S. crewed spaceflight.
- June 17 – Abington School District v. Schempp: The U.S. Supreme Court rules that state-mandated Bible reading in public schools is unconstitutional.
- June 23
  - Walt Disney's Enchanted Tiki Room opens at Disneyland, premiering the first Audio-Animatronics in the park.
  - Detroit Walk to Freedom occurs in Detroit drawing a crowd of roughly 125,000 people.
- June 26 – In a speech in West Berlin, President John F. Kennedy famously declares "Ich bin ein Berliner".

=== July ===
- July 1 – ZIP codes are introduced in the U.S.
- July 7 – Double Seven Day scuffle: Secret police loyal to Ngô Đình Nhu, brother of President Ngô Đình Diệm, attack American journalists including Peter Arnett and David Halberstam at a demonstration during the Buddhist crisis.
- July 26 – NASA launches Syncom, the world's first geostationary (synchronous) satellite.

=== August ===
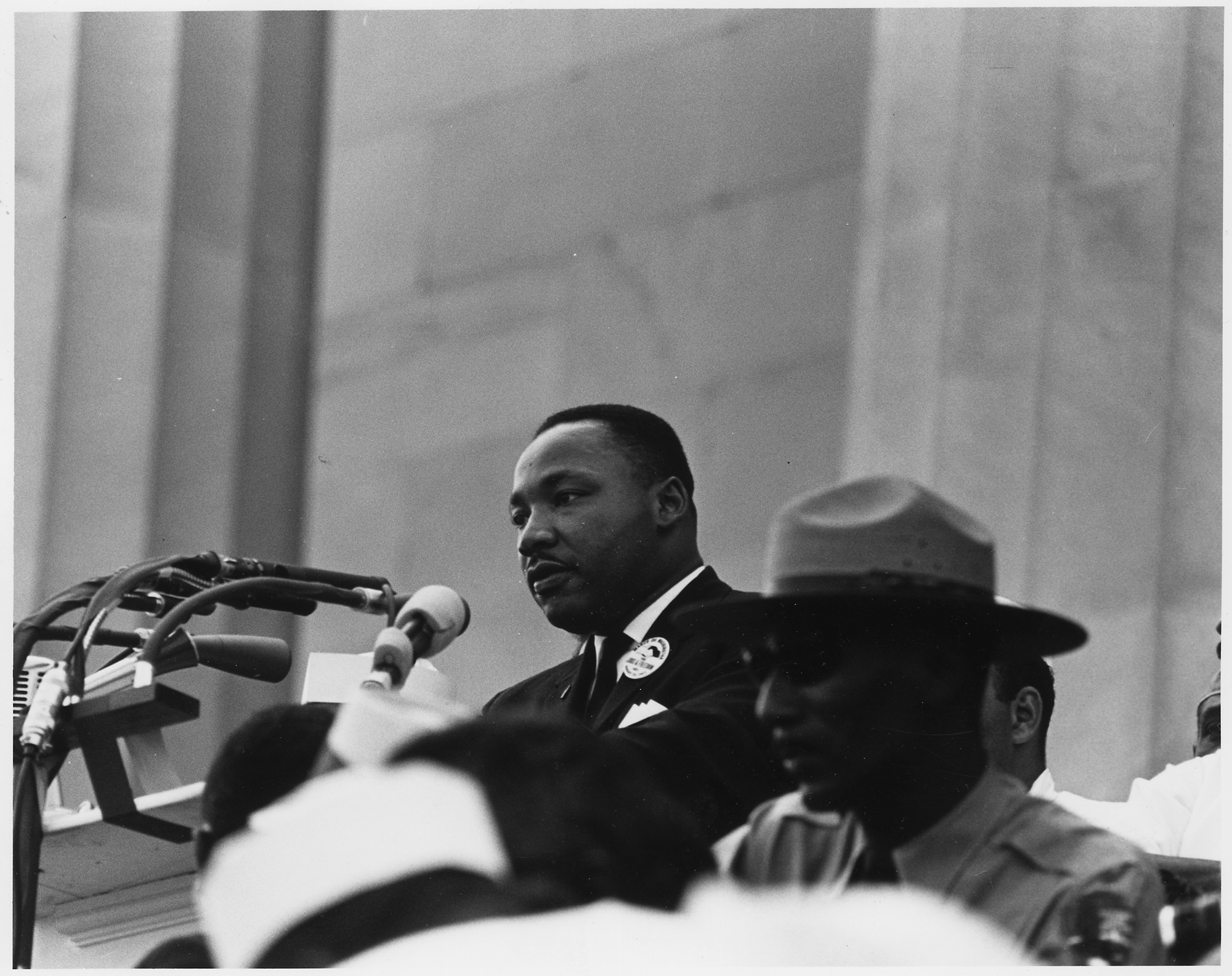
August 28: "I Have a Dream" (Martin Luther King Jr.)

- August 5 – The United States, United Kingdom, and Soviet Union sign a nuclear test ban treaty.
- August 18 – James Meredith becomes the first black person to graduate from the University of Mississippi.
- August 21 – Cable 243: In the wake of the Xá Lợi Pagoda raids, the Kennedy administration orders the US Embassy, Saigon to explore alternative leadership in South Vietnam, opening the way towards a coup against Diem.
- August 28 – Martin Luther King Jr. delivers his "I Have a Dream" speech on the steps of the Lincoln Memorial to an audience of at least 250,000, during the March on Washington for Jobs and Freedom.
- August 30 – The Moscow–Washington hotline (a direct teleprinter link) is inaugurated by President Kennedy.

=== September ===
- September 7 – The Pro Football Hall of Fame opens in Canton, Ohio, with 17 charter members.
- September 15 – The 16th Street Baptist Church bombing in Birmingham, Alabama, kills four children and injures 22.
- September 19 – Iota Phi Theta fraternity is founded.
- September 24 – The U.S. Senate ratifies the nuclear test ban treaty.

=== October ===
- October 1 – The Presidential Commission on the Status of Women issues its final reports to President Kennedy.
- October 6 – The Los Angeles Dodgers defeat the New York Yankees, 4 games to 0, to win their third World Series title in baseball.
- October 8 – Sam Cooke and his band are arrested after trying to register at a "whites only" motel in Louisiana. In the months following, he records "A Change Is Gonna Come".
- October 22 – Chicago Public Schools Boycott.
- October 28 – Demolition of the 1910 Pennsylvania Station begins in New York City, continuing until 1966.
- October 31 – 1963 Indiana State Fairgrounds Coliseum gas explosion: 81 die in a gas explosion during a Holiday on Ice show at the Indiana State Fair Coliseum in Indianapolis.

=== November ===
- November 2–4 – 1963 Freedom Ballot, a mock election organized to protest and combat the systematic disenfranchisement of blacks in Mississippi.
- November 10 – Malcolm X makes his "Message to the Grass Roots" speech in Detroit.
- November 16 – A newspaper strike begins in Toledo, Ohio.
- November 18 – The first push-button telephone is made available to AT&T customers in the United States.

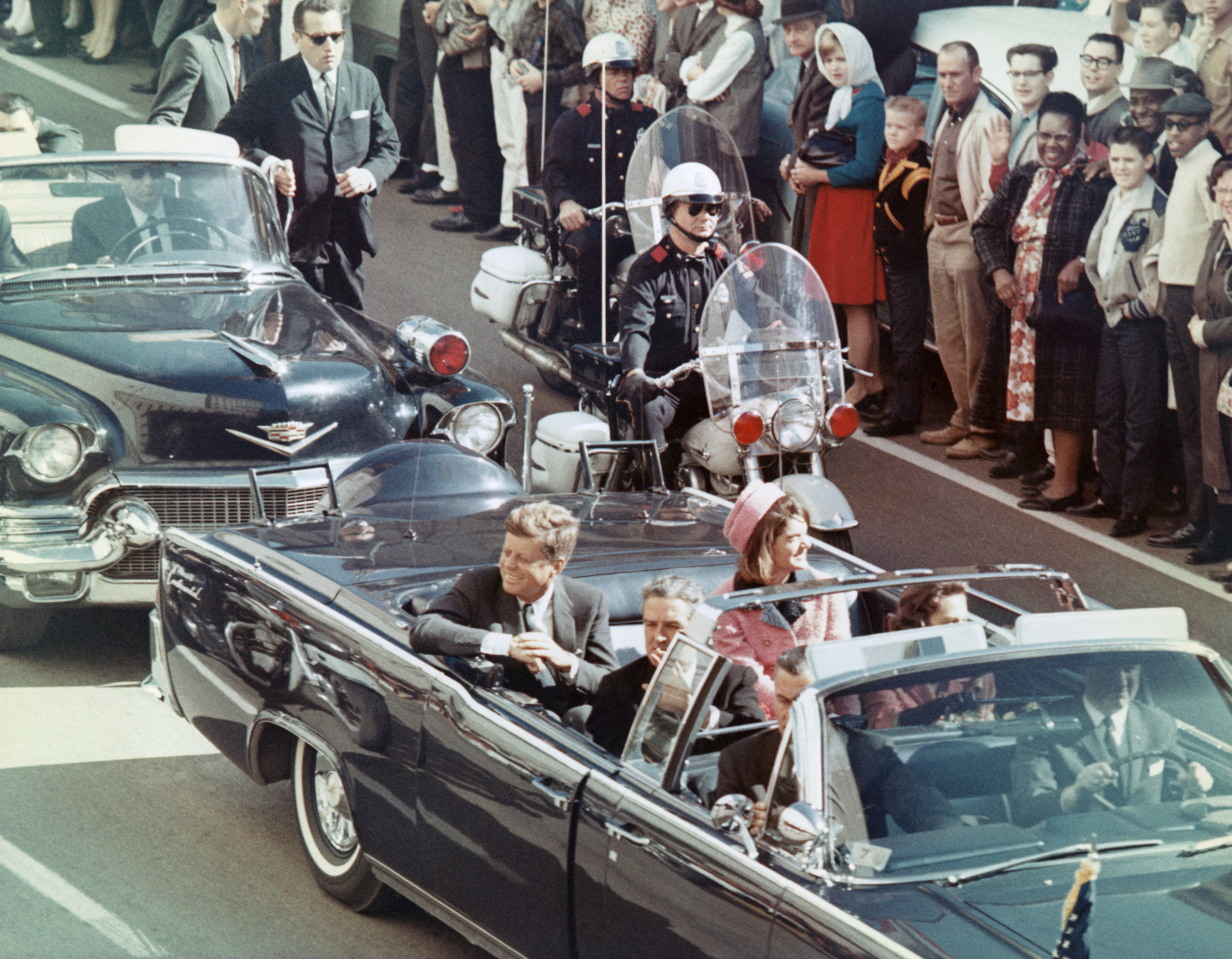
November 22: President Kennedy assassinated

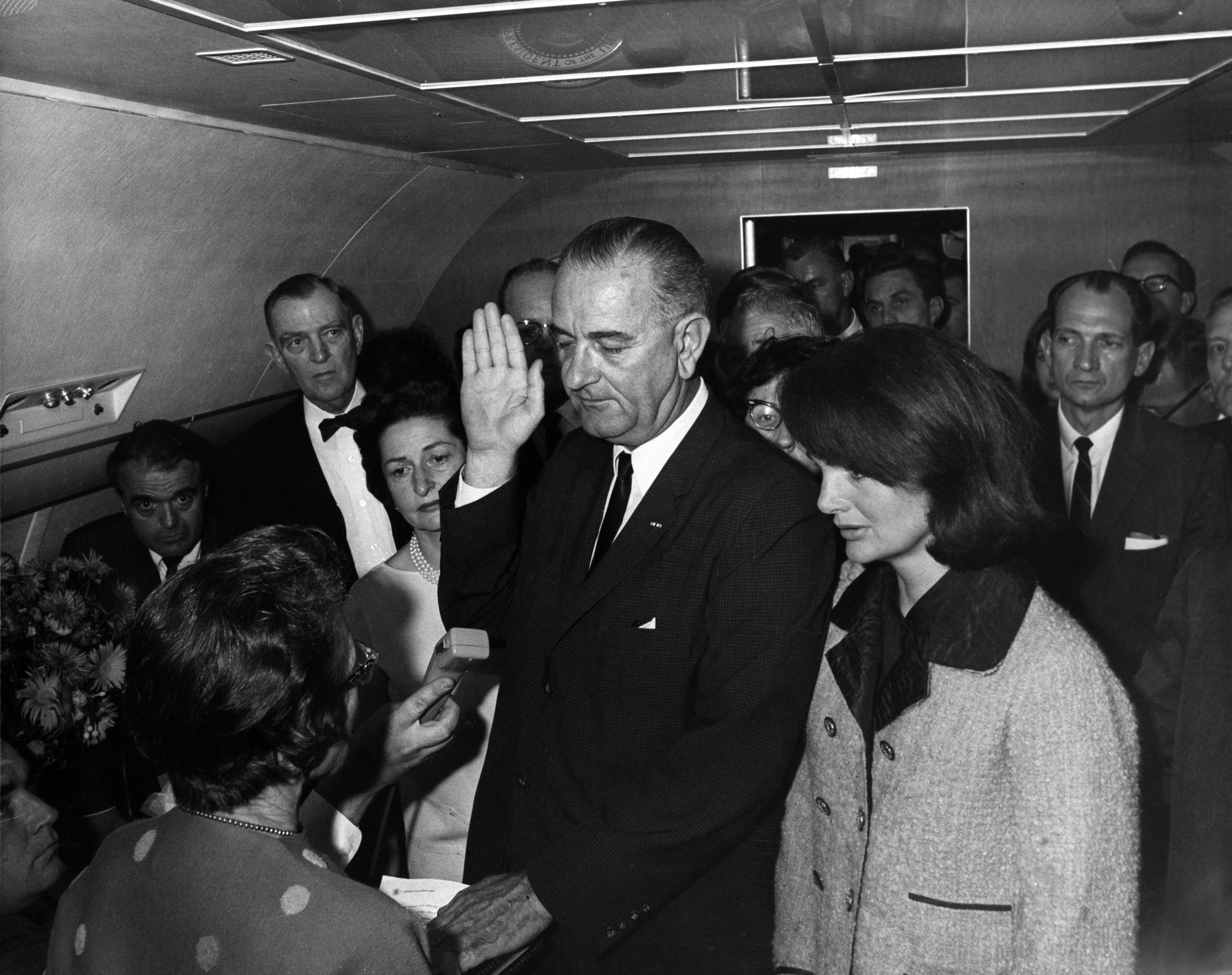
Lyndon Johnson being sworn in as next president, 2 hours after Kennedy's assassination

- November 22 – Assassination of John F. Kennedy: In Dallas, President John F. Kennedy is shot to death, Texas Governor John B. Connally is seriously wounded, and Vice President Lyndon B. Johnson becomes the 36th president. All television coverage for the next three days is devoted to the assassination, its aftermath, the procession of the horsedrawn casket to the Capitol Rotunda, and the funeral of President Kennedy. Stores and businesses shut down for four days, in tribute.
- November 23 – The Golden Age Nursing Home fire kills 63 elderly people near Fitchville, Ohio.

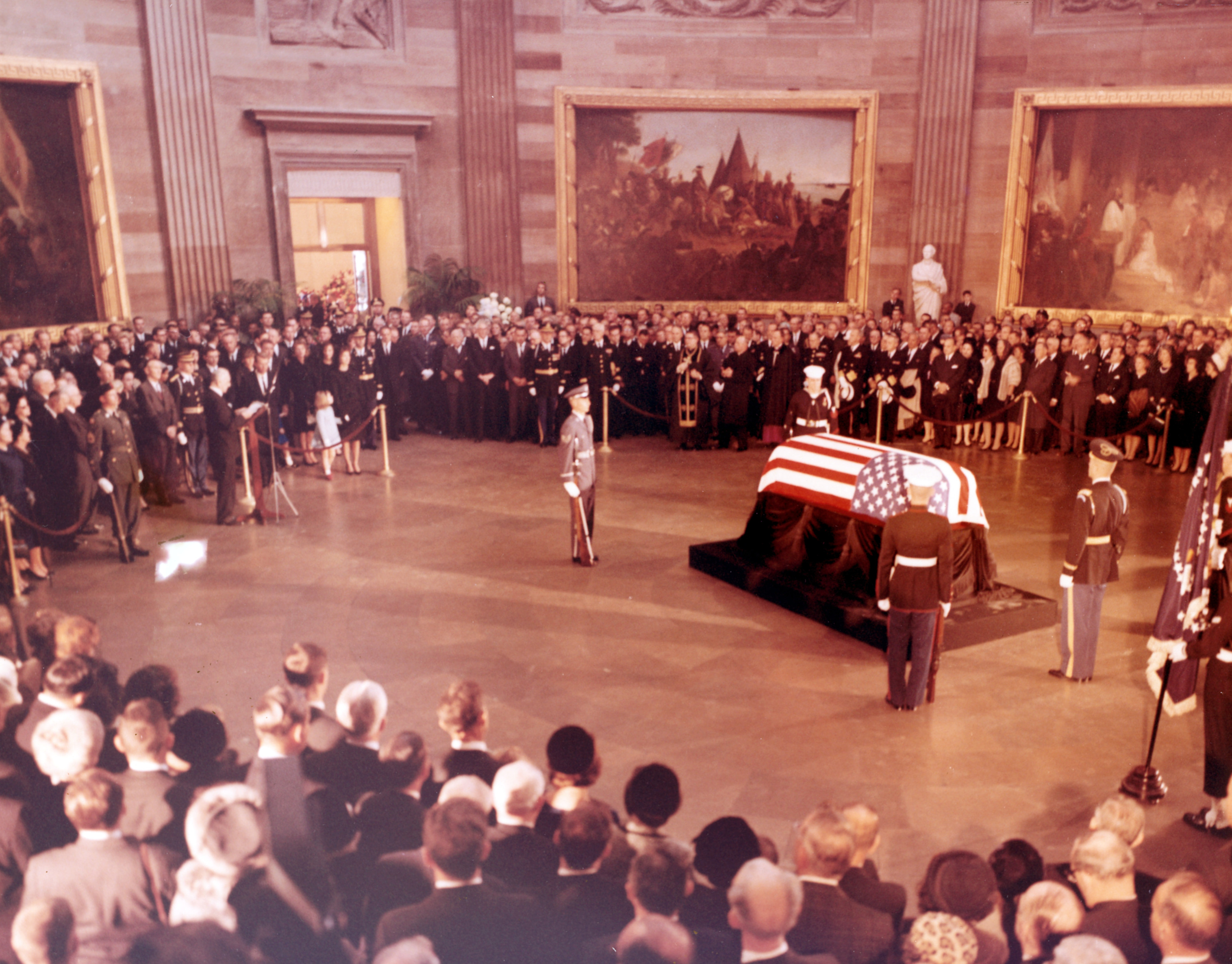
November 24: President Kennedy lying in state at the Capitol rotunda

- November 24
  - Lee Harvey Oswald, assassin of John F. Kennedy, is shot dead by Jack Ruby in Dallas on live national television. Later that night, a hastily arranged program, A Tribute to John F. Kennedy from the Arts, featuring actors, opera singers, and noted writers, all performing dramatic readings and/or music, is telecast on ABC-TV.
  - Vietnam War: President Johnson confirms that the United States intends to continue supporting South Vietnam militarily and economically.
- November 25 – President Kennedy is buried at Arlington National Cemetery. Schools around the nation do not have class on that day, and millions around the world watch the funeral on live television.
- November 29 – President Johnson establishes the Warren Commission to investigate the assassination of President Kennedy.

=== December ===
- December 1 – Wendell Scott becomes the first African-American driver to win a NASCAR race at Speedway Park.
- December 8
  - Frank Sinatra Jr. is kidnapped at Harrah's Lake Tahoe.
  - A lightning strike causes the crash of Pan Am Flight 214 near Elkton, Maryland, killing 81 people.
- December 10
  - The X-20 Dyna-Soar spaceplane program is cancelled.
  - Chuck Yeager becomes the first pilot to make an emergency ejection in the full pressure suit needed for high altitude flights.
- December 14 – Baldwin Hills Dam disaster floods South Los Angeles, causing five deaths.
- December 25 – Walt Disney releases his 18th feature-length animated motion picture, The Sword in the Stone, about the boyhood of King Arthur. It is Disney's final animated film to be released during his lifetime, before his death in 1966.
- December 26 – The Beatles' songs "I Want to Hold Your Hand" and "I Saw Her Standing There" are released in the U.S., marking the beginning of full-scale Beatlemania.

=== Undated ===
- David. H. Frisch and James H. Smith prove that the radioactive decay of mesons is slowed by their motion (see Einstein's special relativity and general relativity).

=== Ongoing ===
- Cold War (1947–1991)
- Space Race (1957–75)
- Civil rights movement (1954–68)

== Births ==
- January 2
  - David Cone, baseball player
  - Edgar Martínez, baseball player
- January 3
  - Rebecca Broussard, actress and model
  - New Jack, professional wrestler (d. 2021)
- January 7 – Rand Paul, U.S. Senator from Kentucky from 2011
- January 9 – Eric Erlandson, guitarist, songwriter and producer
- January 10 – Mark Pryor, U.S. Senator from Arkansas from 2003 to 2014
- January 13 – Tim Kelly, guitarist (d. 1998)
- January 14 – Steven Soderbergh, film director
- January 15 – Bruce Schneier, cryptographer and author
- January 18 – Martin O'Malley, 61st governor of Maryland and 47th mayor of Baltimore
- January 20 – Firebreaker Chip, professional wrestler
- January 25
  - Molly Holzschlag, author and web developer (d. 2023)
  - Don Mancini, screenwriter and film director
- January 26 – Guy Lawson, writer and journalist
- January 30 – Daphne Ashbrook, actress
- January 31 – John Dye, actor (d. 2011)
- February 4 – Tracie Ruiz-Confroto, synchronized swimmer
- February 8
  - Joshua Kadison, singer-songwriter
  - Gene Steratore, American football official
- February 9
  - Brian Greene, theoretical physicist
  - Madusa, wrestler and monster truck driver
- February 10 – Lenny Dykstra, baseball player
- February 11
  - Dan Osman, extreme sport practitioner (d. 1998)
  - Diane Franklin, actress
- February 12
  - Brian Haley, actor and stand-up comedian
  - Brent Jones, American football player
  - John Michael Higgins, actor and voice actor
  - Allison Rosati, Journalist
- February 14 – John R. Dilworth, animator and producer
- February 15 – Steven Michael Quezada, actor
- February 16 – Faran Tahir, Pakistani-American actor
- February 17
  - Michael Jordan, basketball player
  - Rene Syler, television journalist
  - Larry the Cable Guy, stand-up comedian and actor
- February 19 – Jessica Tuck, actress
- February 20 – Charles Barkley, basketball player
- February 21 – William Baldwin, actor, producer and writer
- February 22 – Don Wakamatsu, baseball player and manager
- February 23
  - Reza Abdoh, Iranian-born American director and playwright (d. 1995)
  - Bobby Bonilla, baseball player
- February 25
  - Joseph Edward Duncan, serial killer (d. 2021)
  - Paul O'Neill, baseball player and sportscaster
- February 26 – Chase Masterson, actress and singer
- February 28 – Joey Marella, wrestling referee (d. 1994)
- March 1
  - Bryan Batt, actor
  - Russell Wong, actor
- March 4
  - Jason Newsted, Metallica bassist from 1986 to 2001
  - Daniel Roebuck, actor
- March 5
  - Joe Exotic, zoo owner and convicted felon
  - Joel Osteen, pastor and televangelist
- March 6
  - Kathy Kelly, musician
  - Gary Stevens, jockey
- March 8 – Jim Nelson, journalist and editor
- March 10 – Rick Rubin, record producer
- March 11 – David LaChapelle, photographer
- March 12
  - John Andretti, race car driver (d. 2020)
  - Christine Falling, serial killer of six children
  - Candy Costie, synchronized swimmer
- March 13 – Michael Quercio, musician
- March 14
  - Mike Rochford, Major League Baseball pitcher
  - Andrew Fleming, film director
  - Mike Muir, singer and musician
- March 15
  - Bret Michaels, rock singer (Poison)
  - Greg Nicotero, SFX Artist, television producer, and director
- March 17 – Lise Simms, actress
- March 18
  - Jeff LaBar, rock guitarist (d. 2021)
  - Vanessa Williams, African American model, singer, actress and fashion designer
- March 19 – Mary Scheer, American actress and comedian
- March 20
  - Paul Annacone, tennis player and coach
  - Kathy Ireland, model and actress
- March 21 – Shawn Lane, musician (d. 2003)
- March 22 – Diana Merriweather Ashby, cancer activist (d. 1997)
- March 24 – John T. Chisholm, prosecutor; District Attorney of Milwaukee County, Wisconsin (2007–2025)
- March 25 – Robbie Fulks, alternative country singer-songwriter and instrumentalist
- March 27
  - Dave Koz, jazz musician
  - Quentin Tarantino, filmmaker, screenwriter and actor
- April 4 – Jack Del Rio, American football player and coach
- April 5 – Dawn Crosby, singer (d. 1996)
- April 6
  - Clark Spencer, film producer, businessman and studio executive
  - Derrick May, electronic musician
- April 8 – Dean Norris, actor
- April 9
  - Mike Brumley, baseball player (d. 2024)
  - Marc Jacobs, fashion designer
  - Joe Scarborough, newscaster
- April 10 – Warren DeMartini, rock guitarist
- April 12
  - Michael English, Christian musician
  - Tracy Camilla Johns, actress
- April 13
  - Valerie Plame, CIA Operations officer and novelist
  - Nick Vanos, basketball player (d. 1987)
- April 16 – Jimmy Osmond, American singer
- April 17 – Joel Murray, actor
- April 21
  - Ken Caminiti, baseball player (d. 2004)
  - Brian Goldner, businessman and film producer (d. 2021)
- April 30 – Michael Waltrip, race car driver
- May 1 – Benjamin LaGuer, prisoner proclaiming innocence for more than two decades (d. 2020)
- May 2 – Ray Traylor, professional wrestler ("Big Boss Man") (d. 2004)
- May 7 – Johnny Lee Middleton, bass player and songwriter
- May 8
  - John Altobelli, baseball coach (d. 2020)
  - Melissa Gilbert, actress and president of the Screen Actors Guild
- May 9 – Ron Miles, musician and composer (d. 2022)
- May 12 – Jerry Trimble, actor and martial artist
- May 16 – Jon Coffelt, artist
- May 23 – Wally Dallenbach Jr., race car driver and announcer
- May 24
  - Ken Flach, tennis player (d. 2018)
  - Michael Chabon, author
  - Joe Dumars, basketball player
  - Rich Rodriguez, American football coach
- May 29
  - Lisa Whelchel, actress, singer and writer
  - Tracey E. Bregman, actress and designer
  - Tom Burnett, passenger on board United Airlines Flight 93 (d. 2001)
- May 30 – Shauna Grant, porn actress (d. 1984)
- May 31 – Wesley Willis, outsider musician (d. 2003)
- June 1 – David Rudman, puppeteer, puppet builder, writer, director and producer
- June 4
  - Mossimo Giannulli, fashion designer
  - Ira Valentine, American footballer (d. 2022)
- June 5 – Karl Sanders, singer-songwriter and guitarist
- June 6
  - Anthony Starke, actor
  - Ahmed Johnson, pro wrestler
  - Eric Cantor, politician, lawyer, and banker
- June 9 – Johnny Depp, actor, producer and musician
- June 12
  - Tim DeKay, actor
  - Jerry Lynn, professional wrestler
- June 13 – Greg Daniels, television comedy writer, producer, and director
- June 16
  - The Sandman, professional wrestler
  - Scott Alexander, screenwriter
- June 18 – Bruce Smith, American football player
- June 20
  - Amir Derakh, guitarist
  - Don West, sportscaster (d. 2022)
- June 22 – Randy Couture, martial artist and actor
- June 24 – Mike Wieringo, comic-book artist (d. 2007)
- June 25 – John Benjamin Hickey, actor
- June 27 – David Drake, playwright, stage director, actor and author
- June 28 – Mike Fitzpatrick, lawyer and politician (d. 2020)
- June 29 – Cathy Konrad, film and television producer
- July 1 – Roddy Bottum, musician
- July 3 – Larry Williams, American football player (d. 2025)
- July 4 – Michael Sweet, singer
- July 5 – Dorien Wilson, actor
- July 6
  - Todd Burns, baseball player
  - Lance Johnson, baseball player
- July 7 – Doug Dunakey, golfer
- July 17 – Regina Belle, singer–songwriter and actress
- July 18
  - Sandy Fox, voice actress
  - Mike Greenwell, baseball player and race car driver (d. 2025)
  - Al Snow, professional wrestler
- July 20
  - Adoni Maropis, Greek-American actor
  - Frank Whaley, American actor
- July 22 – Rob Estes, actor
- July 24 – Karl Malone, professional basketball player
- July 30
  - Lisa Kudrow, actress
  - Chris Mullin, basketball player, coach, and executive
- August 1
  - Coolio, rapper, record producer, and actor (d. 2022)
  - John Carroll Lynch, actor and film director
- August 2 – Laura Bennett, fashion designer
- August 3
  - James Hetfield, Metallica vocalist and backing guitarist
  - Lisa Ann Walter, actress and producer
- August 6
  - Gwendolyn Graham, serial killer
  - Kevin Mitnick, computer expert (d. 2023)
- August 7
  - Ramon Estevez, actor
  - Harold Perrineau, actor
- August 9 – Whitney Houston, African American R&B vocalist, wife of Bobby Brown (d. 2012)
- August 11 – Stefon Adams, former NFL cornerback
- August 13 – Steve Higgins, writer, producer, announcer, actor and comedian
- August 19 – John Stamos, actor
- August 22 – Tori Amos, singer-songwriter
- August 23 – Kenny Wallace, race car driver
- August 27 – Bobby Griffith, gay suicide victim (d. 1983)
- August 31 – Egyptian Lover, rapper, DJ and producer
- September 4 – Claudia Rankine, poet
- September 9 – Chris Coons, U.S. Senator from Delaware from 2010
- September 10 – Randy Johnson, baseball player
- September 11 – Joey Dedio, actor
- September 11, Thomas Miller
- September 12 – Norberto Barba, cinematographer and film director
- September 16
  - Richard Marx, singer
  - Leslie Wing, actress
- September 17
  - Gian-Carlo Coppola, film producer (d. 1986)
  - James Urbaniak, actor
- September 18 – Dan Povenmire, animator, voice actor, director, writer, producer and storyboard artist
- September 25 – Tate Donovan, actor and director
- September 26 – Joe Nemechek, stock car driver
- September 28
  - Steve Blackman, professional wrestler
  - Susan Walters, actress and model
  - Elliot Levine, keyboardist (Heatwave)
- September 29
  - O'Landa Draper, gospel music artist (d. 1998)
  - Les Claypool, bassist (Primus)
- October 1
  - Darvin Moon, self-employed logger and amateur poker player (d. 2020)
  - Mark McGwire, baseball player
- October 6 – Elisabeth Shue, actress
- October 10 – Daniel Pearl, journalist (d. 2002)
- October 12 – Lane Frost, bull rider (d. 1989)
- October 14 – Lori Petty, actress, director and screenwriter
- October 16 – David Madson, architect and gay rights activist (d. 1997)
- October 22 – Brian Boitano, figure skater
- October 23 – Gordon Korman, Canadian-born American author
- October 25 – Tracy Nelson, actress, dancer and writer
- October 26
  - Ted Demme, director and producer (d. 2002)
  - Natalie Merchant, singer, songwriter and musician
- October 30 – Rebecca Heineman, video game designer (d. 2025)
- October 31
  - Michael Beach, actor
  - Fred McGriff, baseball player
  - Dermot Mulroney, actor
  - Rob Schneider, actor, comedian and film director
- November 1 – Josh Wicks, soccer player
- November 6
  - Jonna Lee, actress & artist/sculptor
  - Rozz Williams, singer (died 1998)
- November 8 – Paul Butcher, American football linebacker
- November 10
  - Tommy Davidson, comedian, film and television actor
  - Mike McCarthy, American football coach
  - Mike Powell, long jumper
- November 11 – Billy Gunn, professional wrestler
- November 13 – Vinny Testaverde, American football player
- November 18
  - Len Bias, basketball player (died 1986)
  - Dante Bichette, baseball player
- November 22
  - Winsor Harmon, actor
  - Brian Robbins, actor, director, producer and screenwriter
- November 25
  - Chip Kelly, American football player and coach
  - Bernie Kosar, American football player
  - Kevin Chamberlin, actor
- November 27
  - Dave Prichard, guitarist (died 1990)
  - Linda Yaccarino, media executive
- December 2
  - Dan Gauthier, actor
  - Ann Patchett, author
- December 8 – Wendell Pierce, African American actor
- December 12 – Liz Claman, journalist
- December 15 – Lenny Young, film producer
- December 16 – Benjamin Bratt, actor, producer and activist
- December 18 – Brad Pitt, film actor and producer
- December 20 – Joel Gretsch, actor
- December 23
  - Jim Harbaugh, American football player and coach
  - Jess Harnell, voice actor and singer
  - Donna Tartt, novelist
- December 30 – Kim Hill, Christian singer
- December 31 – Eugene McDowell, basketball player (d. 1995)

== Deaths ==
- January 1 – Robert S. Kerr, businessman and politician (b. 1896)
- January 2
  - Jack Carson, Canadian-born American actor (b. 1910)
  - Dick Powell, actor (b. 1904)
- January 5 – Rogers Hornsby, baseball player (St. Louis Cardinals) (b. 1896)
- January 6
  - Frank Tuttle, film director (b. 1892)
  - Stark Young, teacher, playwright, novelist, painter, literary critic and essayist (b. 1881)
- January 8
  - Boris Morros, film producer and FBI double agent (b. 1891)
  - Jack Okey, art director (b. 1889)
  - Kay Sage, poet (b. 1898)
- January 9 – Enea Bossi Sr., aerospace engineer and aviation pioneer (b. 1888 in Italy)
- January 27 – John Farrow, Australian film director (b. 1904)
- January 22 – Richard Spikes, inventor (b. 1878)
- January 29 – Robert Frost, poet (b. 1874)
- February 11 – Sylvia Plath, Poet, short story writer, and novelist (b. 1932)
- March 4 – William Carlos Williams, poet (b. 1883)
- March 5 – plane crash
  - Patsy Cline, country music singer (b. 1932)
  - Cowboy Copas, country music singer (b. 1913)
  - Hawkshaw Hawkins, country music singer (b. 1921)
- March 8 – Jack Anglin, country music singer (b. 1916)
- March 11 – Joe Judge, baseball player (b. 1894)
- April 3 – Alma Richards, high jumper (b. 1890)
- April 4 – Jason Robards Sr., actor (b. 1892)
- April 9 – Eddie Edwards, jazz trombonist (b. 1891)
- April 23 – Don Harvey, actor (b. 1911)
- May 2 – Van Wyck Brooks, literary critic and writer (b. 1886)
- May 6 – Monty Woolley, character actor (b. 1888)
- May 11 – Herbert Spencer Gasser, physiologist, Nobel Prize in Physiology or Medicine laureate (b. 1888)
- May 18 – Ernie Davis, American football player, first African American to win the Heisman Trophy (b. 1939)
- May 19 – Walter Russell, polymath (b. 1871)
- May 24 – Elmore James, African American blues guitarist (b. 1918)
- June 4 – Dorothy Short, actress (b. 1915)
- June 7 – ZaSu Pitts, film actress (b. 1894)
- June 10 – Anita King, actress and race-car driver (b. 1884)
- June 12 – Medgar Evers, field secretary for the National Association for the Advancement of Colored People, assassinated in Mississippi due to civil rights activity (b. 1925)
- June 28 – Home Run Baker, baseball player (b. 1886)
- July 2 – Alicia Patterson, newspaper editor (b. 1906)
- July 9 – Frank Mayo, actor (b. 1889)
- July 11 – Arthur Marshall Davis, judge (b. 1907)
- July 27 – Garrett Morgan, inventor, businessman, and community leader (b. 1877)
- August 1 – Theodore Roethke, poet (b. 1908)
- August 2 – Oliver La Farge, fiction writer and anthropologist (b. 1901)
- August 3 – Phil Graham, newspaperman (b. 1915)
- August 4 – Tom Keene, Western film actor (b. 1896)
- August 9 – Patrick Bouvier Kennedy, son of President and Mrs. Kennedy (b. August 7)
- August 10 – Estes Kefauver, politician (b. 1903)
- August 11 – Clem Bevans, character actor (b. 1879)
- August 14 – Clifford Odets, playwright (b. 1906)
- August 23 – Glen Gray, jazz saxophonist (b. 1900)
- August 26 – Larry Keating, actor (b. 1899)
- August 27 – W. E. B. Du Bois, leading African American sociologist, historian and co-founder of the National Association for the Advancement of Colored People (b. 1868)
- September 11 – Claude Fuess, 10th Headmaster of Phillips Academy, Andover, Massachusetts (b. 1885)
- October 4
  - Lloyd Fredendall, U.S. Army general (b. 1883)
  - Kate Gordon Moore, psychologist (b. 1878)
- October 11 – John W. Nordstrom, Swedish-born American co-founder of the Nordstrom department store chain (d. 1963)
- October 20 – Everett Warner, impressionist painter and printmaker (b. 1877)
- October 24 – Douglas Croft, actor (b. 1926)
- October 29 – Adolphe Menjou, actor (b. 1890)
- November 1 – Elsa Maxwell, gossip columnist, author, songwriter, screenwriter, and personality (b. 1883)
- November 5 – Vernon Dent, American actor and comedian, main antagonist of the Three Stooges (b. 1895)
- November 22
  - Aldous Huxley, writer (b. 1894 in the United Kingdom)
  - John F. Kennedy, 35th president of the United States from 1961 to 1963 (b. 1917)
  - J. D. Tippit, Dallas police officer (b. 1924)
- November 24 – Lee Harvey Oswald, sniper, assassinated John F. Kennedy (b. 1939)
- November 25 – Joseph Sweeney, actor (b. 1884)
- November 26 – Amelita Galli-Curci, Italian-born operatic soprano (b. 1882 in Italy)
- November 28 – Karyn Kupicnet, American actress (b. 1941)
- November 30 – Phil Baker, comedian and emcee (b. 1896)
- December 14 – Dinah Washington, African American blues singer (b. 1924)
- December 26 – Gorgeous George, professional wrestler (b. 1915)
- December 28
  - A. J. Liebling, journalist (b. 1904)
  - Joseph Magliocco, mobster (b. 1898)

== See also ==
- List of American films of 1963
- Timeline of United States history (1950–1969)
