= STS-112 =

2002 American crewed spaceflight to the ISS

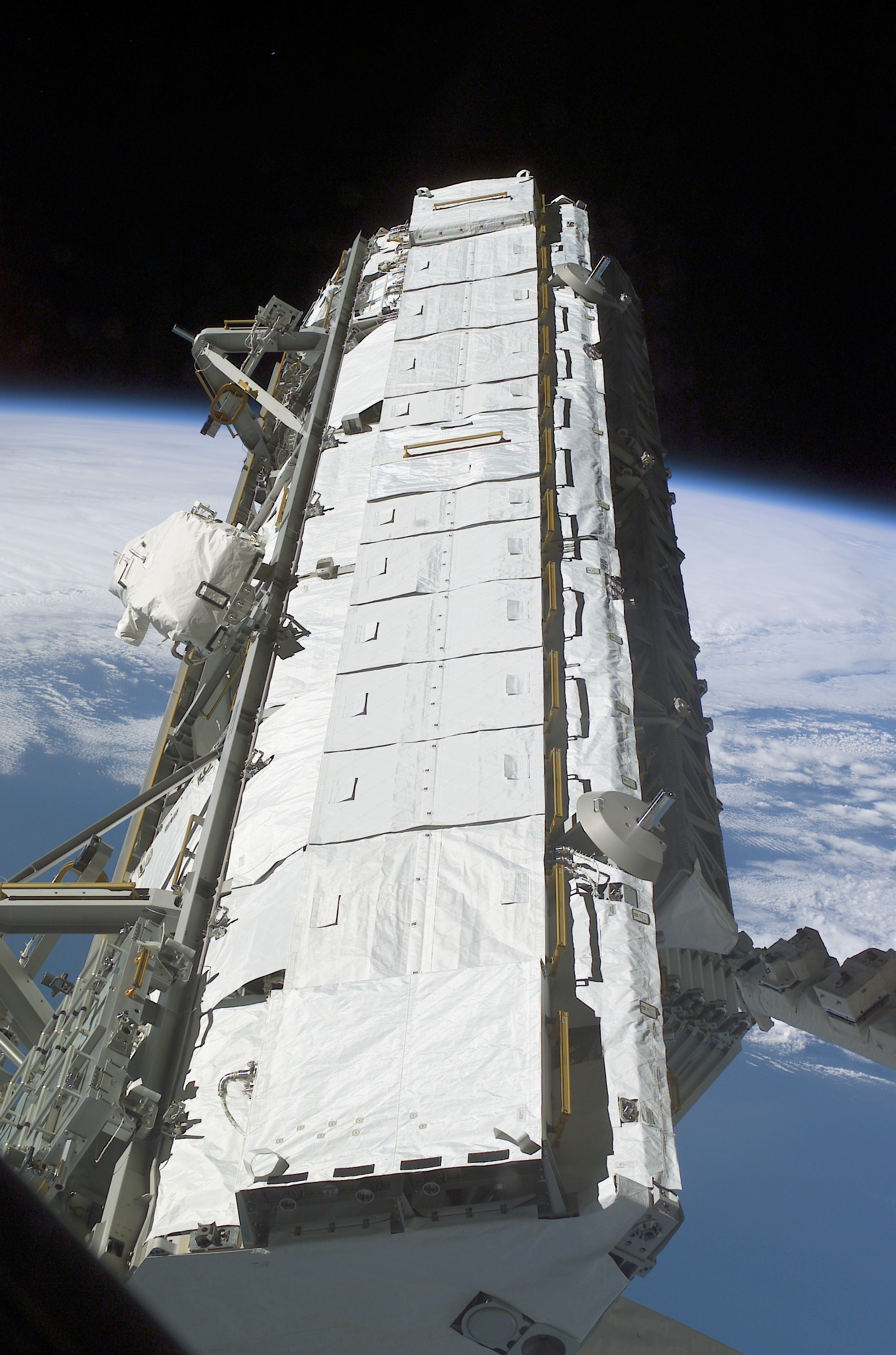
- Canadarm2 takes the S1 truss out of the payload bay of Atlantis, prior to its installation on the ISS
- Names: Space Transportation System-112
- Mission type: ISS assembly
- Operator: NASA
- COSPAR ID: 2002-047A
- SATCAT no.: 27537
- Mission duration: 10 days, 19 hours, 58 minutes, 44 seconds
- Distance travelled: 7,200,000 kilometres (4,500,000 mi)
- Orbits completed: 170

Spacecraft properties
- Spacecraft: Space Shuttle Atlantis
- Launch mass: 116,538 kilograms (256,922 lb)
- Landing mass: 91,390 kilograms (201,480 lb)
- Payload mass: 12,572 kilograms (27,717 lb)

Crew
- Crew size: 6
- Members: Jeffrey S. Ashby; Pamela A. Melroy; David A. Wolf; Sandra H. Magnus; Piers Sellers; Fyodor N. Yurchikhin

Start of mission
- Launch date: 7 October 2002, 19:45:51 UTC
- Launch site: Kennedy, LC-39B

End of mission
- Landing date: 18 October 2002, 15:44:35 UTC
- Landing site: Kennedy, SLF Runway 33

Orbital parameters
- Reference system: Geocentric
- Regime: Low Earth
- Perigee altitude: 273 kilometres (170 mi)
- Apogee altitude: 405 kilometres (252 mi)
- Inclination: 51.6 degrees
- Period: 91.2 minutes

Docking with ISS
- Docking port: PMA-2 (Destiny forward)
- Docking date: 9 October 2002, 15:16 UTC
- Undocking date: 16 October 2002, 13:13 UTC
- Time docked: 6 days, 21 hours, 57 minutes
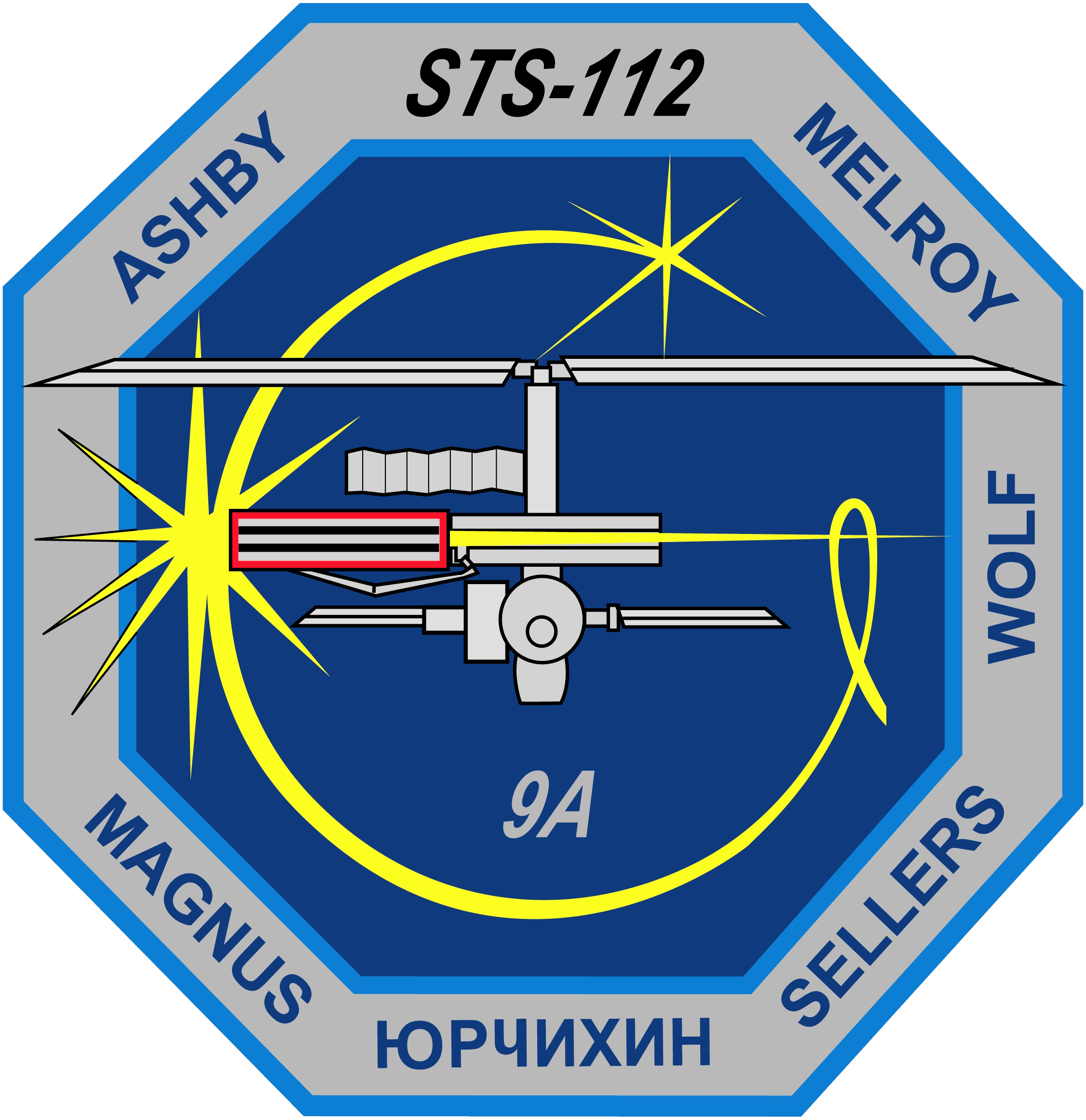
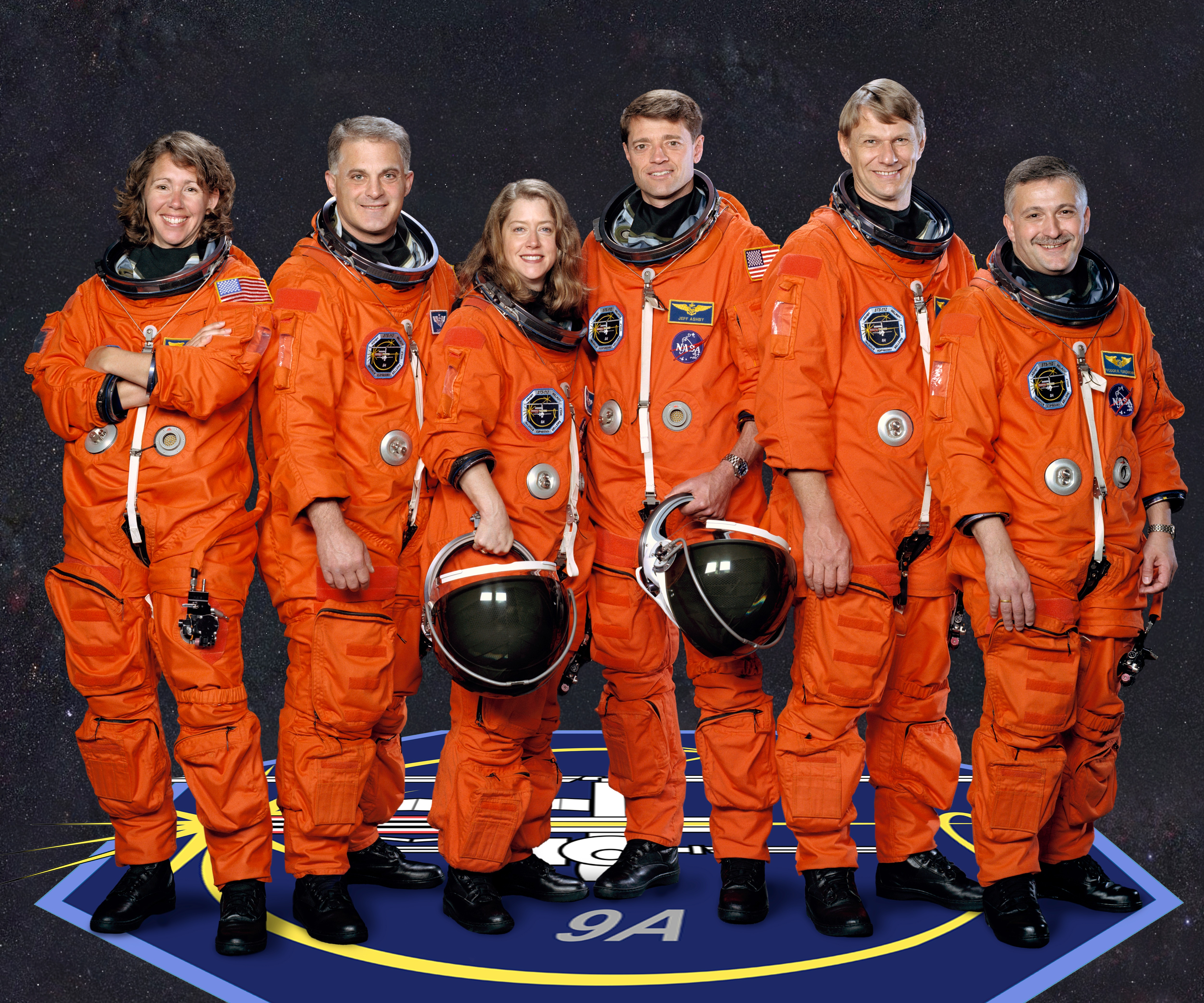
- (L-R): Sandra H. Magnus, David A. Wolf, Pamela A. Melroy, Jeffrey S. Ashby, Piers J. Sellers and Fyodor Yurchikhin Space Shuttle program

STS-112 (ISS assembly flight 9A) was an 11-day Space Shuttle mission to the International Space Station (ISS) flown by Space Shuttle Atlantis. Space Shuttle Atlantis was launched on 7 October 2002 at 19:45 UTC from the Kennedy Space Center's launch pad 39B to deliver the 28,000 pound Starboard 1 (S1) truss segment to the Space Station. Ending a 4.5-million-mile journey, Atlantis landed at 15:44 UTC on 18 October 2002 on runway 33 at the Kennedy Space Center's Shuttle Landing Facility.

During the launch, the ET bipod ramp shed a chunk of foam that caused a dent ~4" wide and 3" deep into the metal SRB-ET Attach Ring near the bottom of the left Space Shuttle Solid Rocket Booster. Prior to the next mission (STS-113), an upper-level decision was made at NASA to continue with launches as scheduled. The launch subsequent to that was the Space Shuttle Columbia disaster, the ill-fated STS-107.

Space Shuttle Atlantis had been scheduled to visit the International Space Station (ISS) again on the STS-114 mission in March 2003; however, due to the loss of Columbia, all Space Shuttles, including Atlantis, were temporarily grounded. Due to rescheduling of missions, Atlantis did not fly again until STS-115 on 9 September 2006.

== Crew ==
Position	Astronaut
Commander	(United States) Jeffrey S. Ashby; Third and last spaceflight
Pilot	(United States) Pamela A. Melroy; Second spaceflight
Mission Specialist 1	(United States) David A. Wolf; Third spaceflight
Mission Specialist 2 Flight Engineer	(United States) Sandra H. Magnus; First spaceflight
Mission Specialist 3	(United States) Piers Sellers; First spaceflight
Mission Specialist 4	(Russia) Fyodor N. Yurchikhin, RKA; First spaceflight

== Mission payload ==
Location	Cargo	Mass
Bays 1–2	Orbiter Docking System; 2 EMU spacesuits	1,800 kilograms (4,000 lb); 240 kilograms (530 lb)
Bays 3–13	S1 Integrated Truss Segment; CETA Cart A	12,572 kilograms (27,717 lb); 283 kilograms (624 lb)
Sill	Remote Manipulator System	410 kilograms (900 lb)
	Total:	15,305 kilograms (33,742 lb)

=== Starboard 1 (S1) truss segment ===
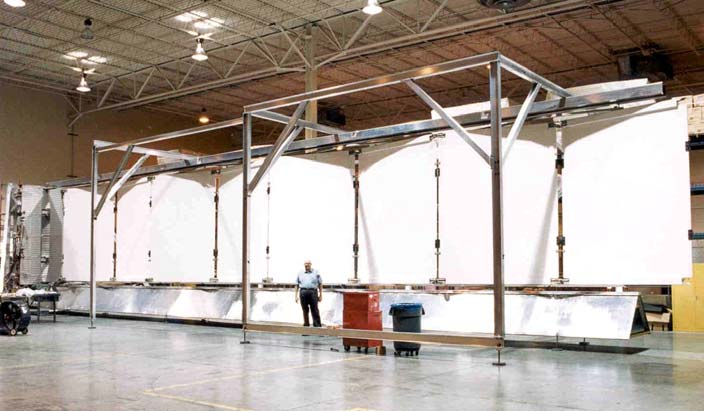
The S1 Radiator panels being manufactured at the Michoud Assembly Facility

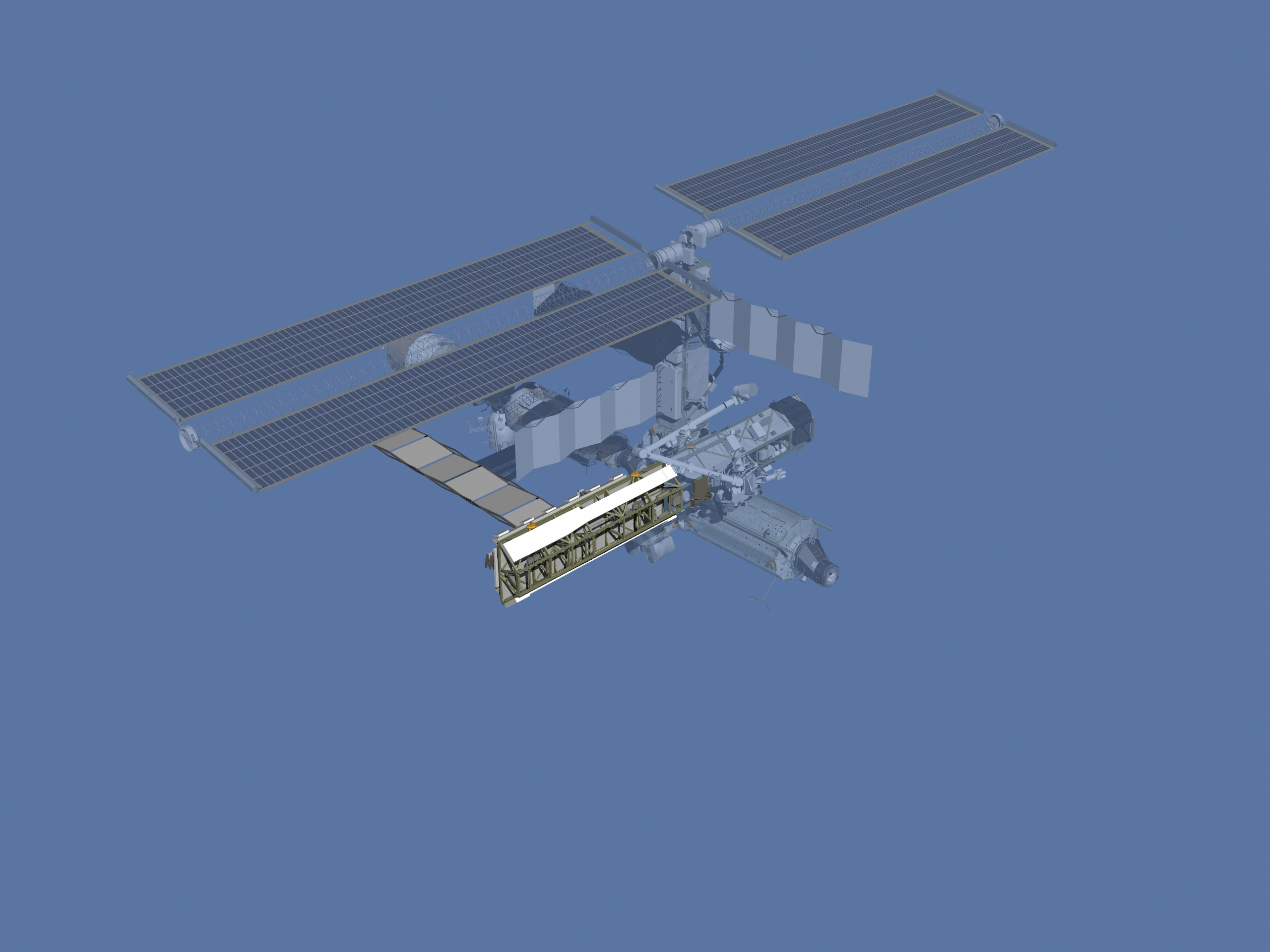
Illustration of the International Space Station after STS-112.

The S1 truss segment, which provides structural support for the Space Station radiators, was the main payload of STS-112 mission.

The Boeing Company (along with Lockheed Martin) started manufacturing the truss in May 1998 at Michoud. The work was completed in March 1999. The S1 was shipped by aircraft to the KSC Operations and Checkout Building in October 1999 for flight processing. In June 2002, the truss was handed over to NASA for final preparations and pre-flight checks at the Space Station Processing Facility.

=== Crew Equipment Translation Aid ===
Atlantis also delivered the Crew Equipment Translation Aid (CETA) Cart to the Space Station. The CETA cart was attached to the Mobile Transporter (launched on STS-110) to be used by assembly crews on later missions.

== Mission experiments ==
STS-112 carried several science experiments to the space station including the Plant Generic Bioprocessing Apparatus (PGBA), Commercial Generic Bioprocessing Apparatus (CGBA), the Protein Crystal Growth Single-locker Thermal Enclosure System housing the Protein Crystallization Apparatus for Microgravity (PCG-STES-PCAM) and samples for the Zeolite Crystal Growth Furnace (ZCG) experiment.

== Shuttle processing ==
Attempt	Planned	Result	Turnaround	Reason	Decision point	Weather go (%)	Notes
1	2 Oct 2002, 2:00:00 pm	Scrubbed	—	Weather	1 Oct 2002, 3:15 pm (T−11:00:00 hold)	60	Johnson Space Center powered down due to threat of Hurricane Lili.
2	7 Oct 2002, 3:45:51 pm	Success	5 days 1 hour 46 minutes			90	

Launch preparations for STS-112 mission were sightly delayed due to tiny cracks found within the plumbing of Atlantis' propulsion system on 17 June 2002 by an inspector. The cracks were in metal flow liners inside the main liquid hydrogen fuel lines that feed the shuttle's three main engines. Although there were no cracks in the actual fuel pipes themselves, the concern was that metal pieces from the flow liners might break off and fly into the engines. In such a worst-case scenario, the debris can potentially trigger a catastrophic engine shutdown, which in turn could lead to the loss of the crew and the shuttle. Similar cracks were found in the remaining orbiters and the space shuttle program was temporally grounded so engineers could analyze the problem. The shuttle was cleared to resume flight in September with launch originally scheduled for October 2, but due to concerns that Hurricane Lili could hit Houston, the Johnson Space Center was powered down.

== Mission timeline ==
=== 7 October (Flight Day 1 – Launch) ===
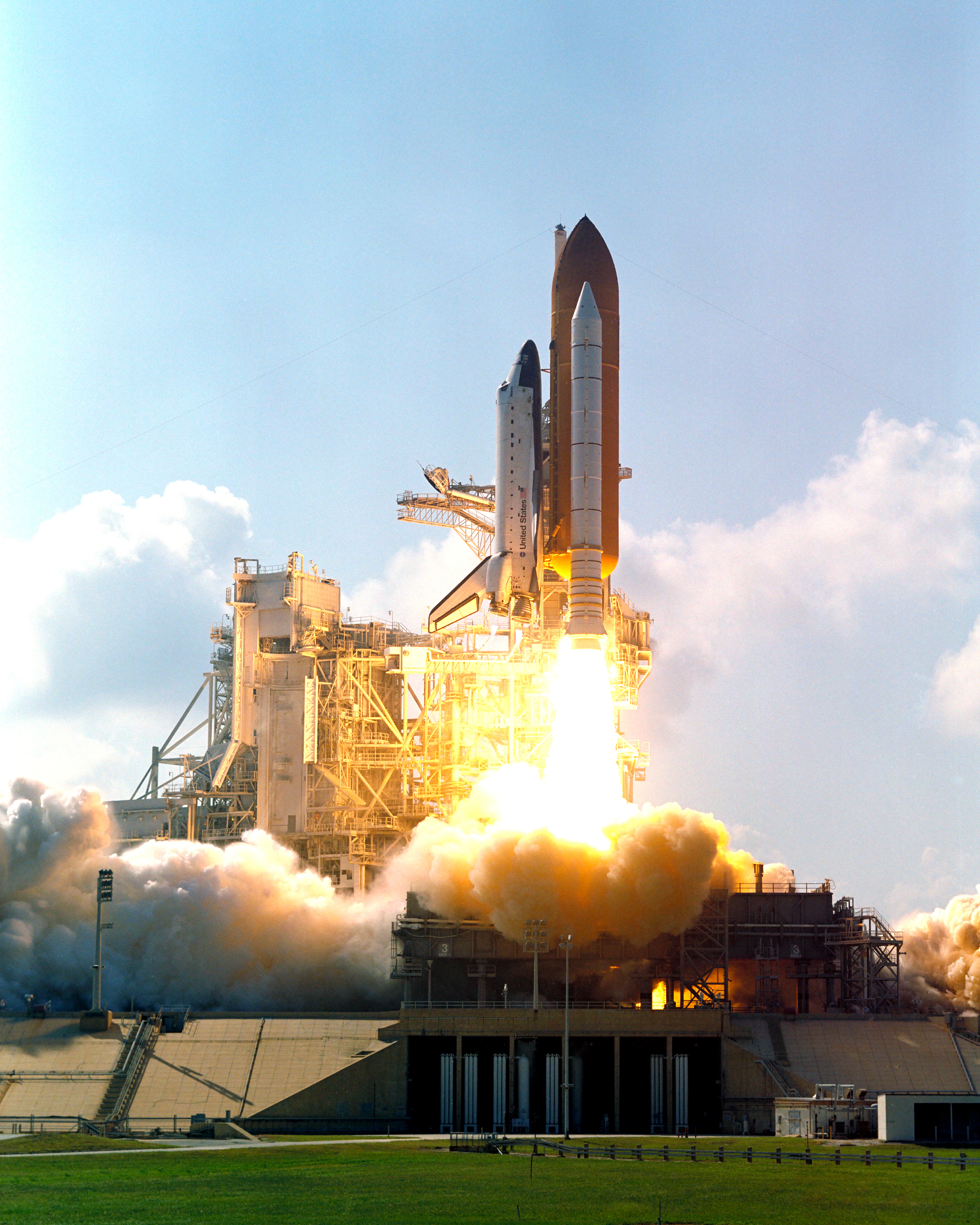
Atlantis launches on STS-112.

Space Shuttle Atlantis lifted off from Launch Pad 39B of the Kennedy Space Center at 19:45:51 GMT through mostly clear blue skies. There were no problems reported during the countdown, and the ascent conformed to the standard timeline (see Space Shuttle – Mission Profile – Launch). For the first time in Space Shuttle history, a "rocketcam" video camera mounted to the upper part of Atlantis' external tank returned live video of the flight to NASA flight controllers. The video was near perfect until the two solid rocket boosters were jettisoned. At that point, the exhaust from the separation motors fogged the camera lens and made the rest of the video difficult to see.

Later, NASA announced that it was looking into a problem with explosive bolts that failed to fire properly during the launch. Immediately before the twin solid rocket boosters fired into life, only one set of pyrotechnics in ten explosive bolts exploded when commanded to do so. All 10 nuts exploded as planned, but NASA was interested in finding out an explanation for the unexpected anomaly.

Arguably the most significant event from this launch was the ET bipod ramp shedding a chunk of foam, estimated to be ~4"x5"x12", that broke away and hit the lower left SRB-ET Attach Ring near the Integrated Electronics Assembly (IEA) box causing a dent ~4" wide and 3" deep into the solid metal. Prior to approval for the next mission, the situation was analyzed and NASA decided to press ahead under the justification that "The ET is safe to fly with no new concerns (and no added risk)" of further foam strikes. This fateful decision set the stage for the STS-107 tragedy just two launches later. The CAIB report did not highlight the significance of video data from this being the first flight with the ET Camera.

=== 8 October (Flight Day 2 – Rendezvous and docking preparations) ===
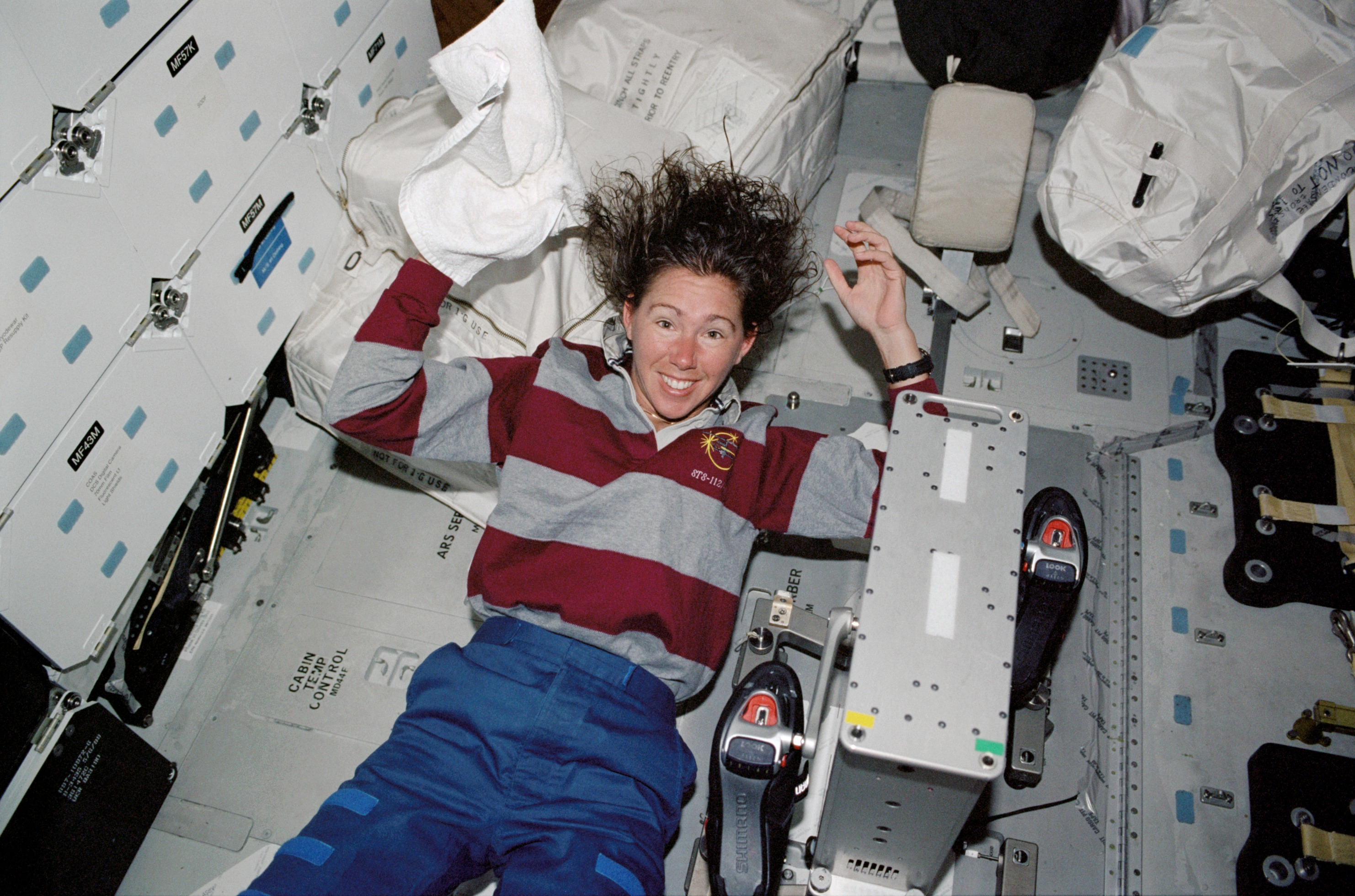
Sandra Magnus washes her hair in the middeck of Atlantis

On Flight Day 2, the STS-112 crew settled into preparations for the next day's rendezvous and docking with the International Space Station. After the wake up call went at 4:46 am CDT, the crew began its first full day on orbit. Pilot Pamela Melroy assisted Mission Specialists David Wolf and Piers Sellers in a checkout of spacewalk suits and equipment. Commander Jeff Ashby worked with the prime robotic arm operator, Mission Specialist Sandy Magnus, to verify the arm's readiness. Ashby and Magnus powered up the arm for a video survey of Atlantis' payload bay. The crew also completed the setting up of the orbiter docking system's centerline camera, extended the orbiter's spring-loaded ring that will make first contact, and checked out rendezvous tools.

During the day, the STS-112 crew successfully completed three Orbital Maneuvering System (OMS) burns to boost the shuttle into the station's orbit and refine its approach path to the station.

Astronaut Wolf also checked-out the Spatial Heterodyne Imager for Mesospheric Radicals or the SHIMMER experiment sponsored by the Naval Research Lab. The SHIMMER experiment uses an ultraviolet sensing camera to observe the Earth's atmosphere at 40–90 kilometers looking for possible ozone loss. The experiment proved balky, but with help from Mission Control the crew worked out steps to ready the gear for observations during the mission.

=== 9 October (Flight Day 3 – Docking) ===
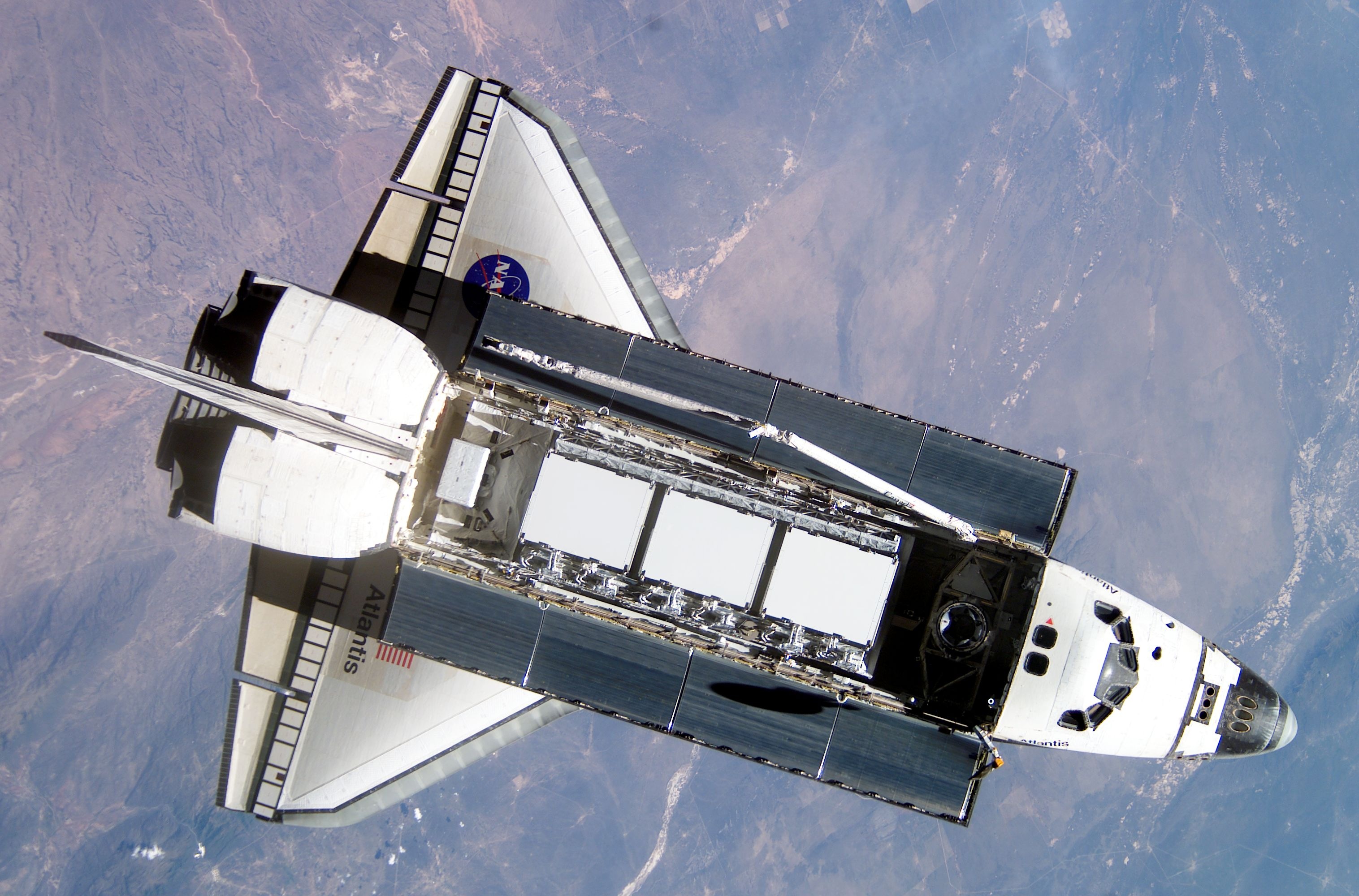
Atlantis during rendezvous and docking operations. The steel truss segment and radiators can be seen clearly in the payload bay

Space Shuttle Atlantis docked to the Space Station at 15:17 GMT to begin a week of joint operations for the STS-112 and Expedition 5 crews. With commander Jeffrey Ashby at the controls, Atlantis' docking system engaged the Pressurized Mating Adapter-2 (Destiny Laboratory's forward docking port) in the front of the space station as the two spacecraft sailed 245 miles above central Asia at five miles per second. Crew members of Atlantis were the first visitors for the Expedition 5 station crew who arrived at the outpost the first week of June 2002.

Following pressure checks, station science officer Peggy Whitson asked Commander Ashby if he had brought the salsa that she had asked for. When Ashby replied that he had, Whitson said "OK, we'll let you in". The hatches between Atlantis and the Space Station were opened at 16:51 GMT and astronaut Ashby floated into the Destiny Module and immediately embraced Whitson. Mission Specialist Sandra Magnus followed next, followed by the rest of Atlantis' STS-112 crew members. They were greeted by the three member station crew.

After a safety briefing from station commander Valery Korzun, the combined crews split up and began preparing for a busy day of work. Astronaut Pamela Melroy, cosmonaut Korzun, and Mission Specialists Dave Wolf, Piers Sellers, and Fyodor Yurchikhin configured the spacesuits for EVA 1. Magnus and Whitson reviewed robotic arm operations for moving the new truss segment into place.

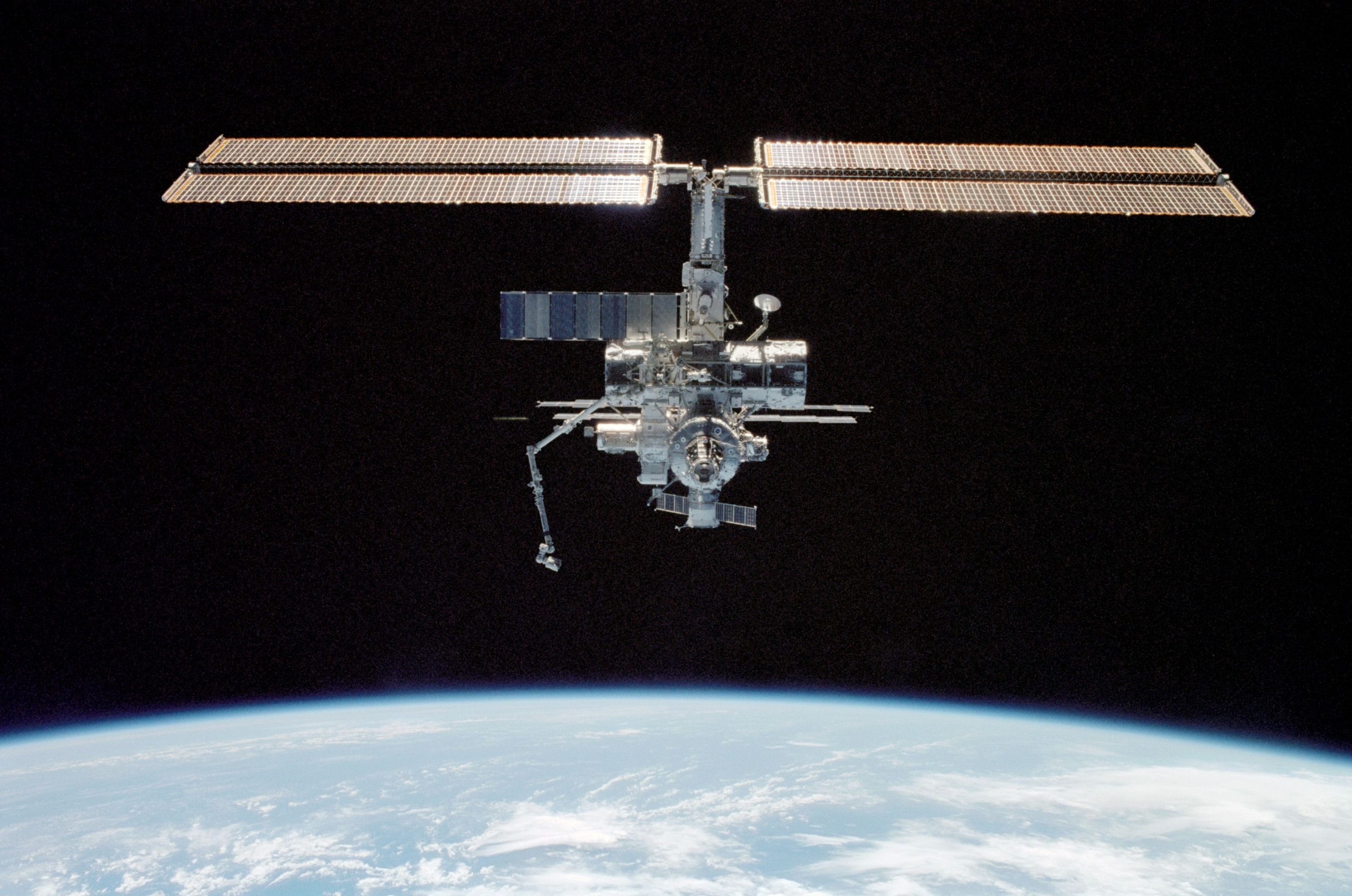
Space Station photographed by a STS-112 crew member

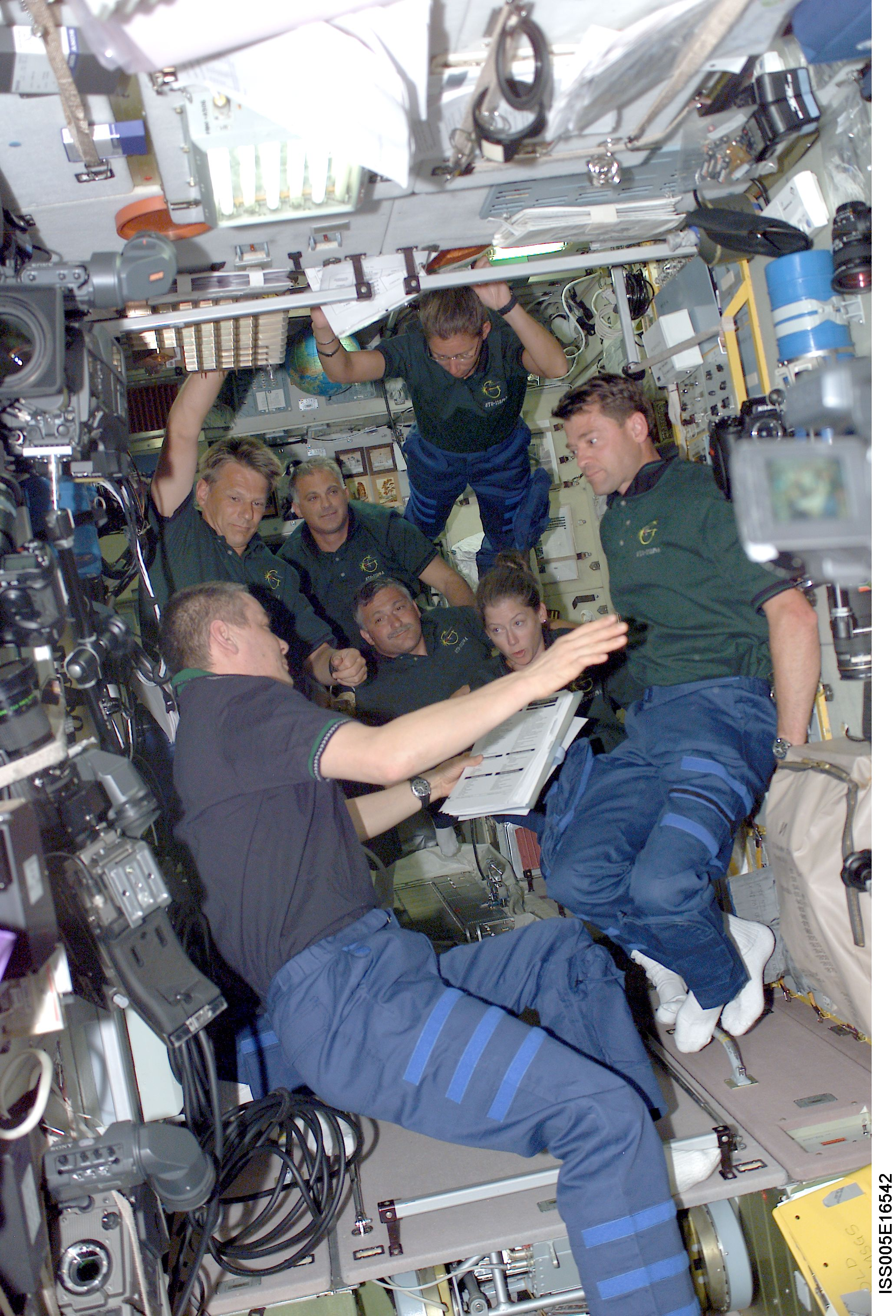
STS-112 crew receives a safety briefing from Station Commander Korzun

=== 10 October (Flight Day 4 – EVA 1) ===
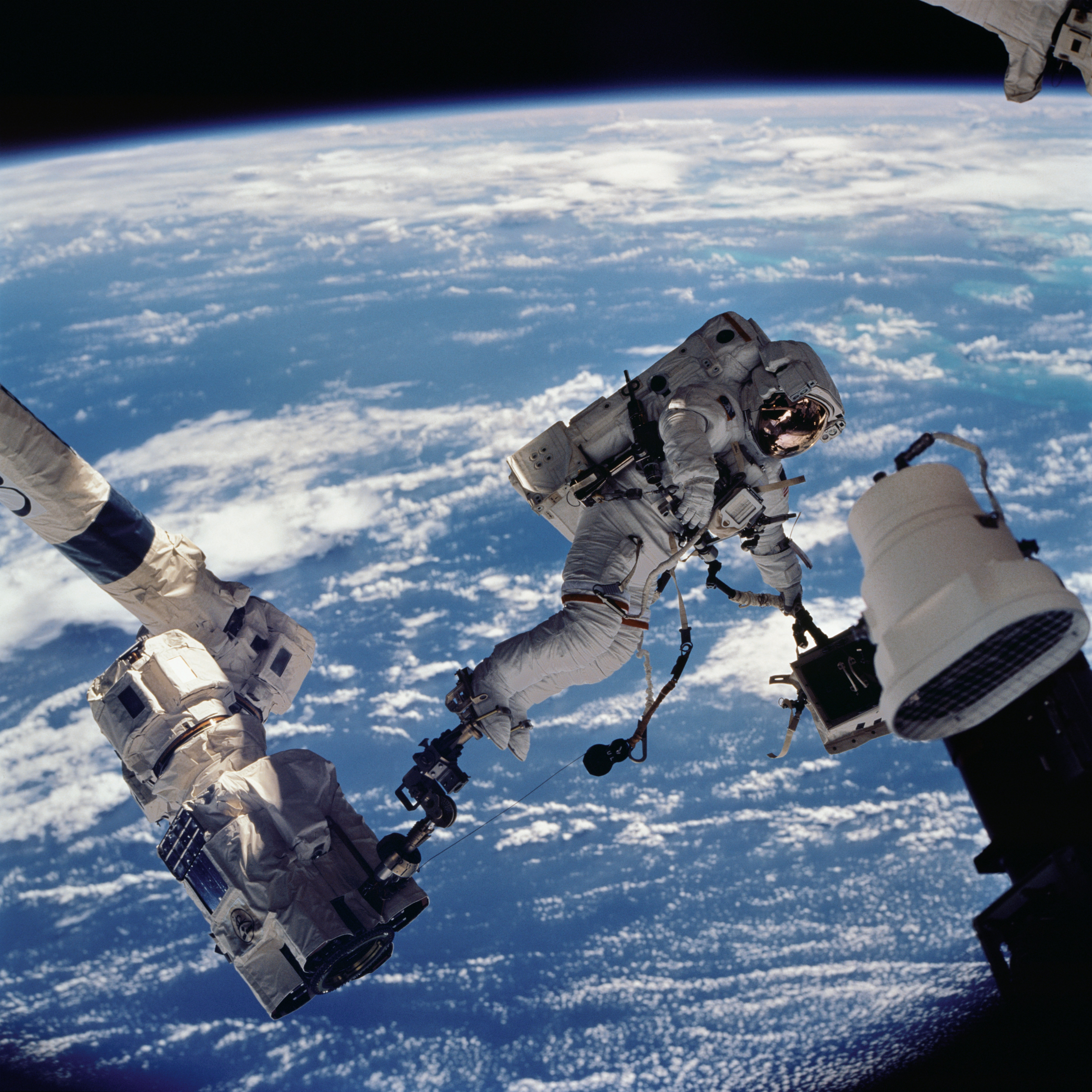
David Wolf carries the S1 outboard nadir external camera during EVA 1.

The workday began at 3 am CDT with a musical wakeup call to Atlantis' crew from Mission Control, Houston. Earlier on Flight Day 4 astronauts Whitson and Magnus used the station's Canadarm2 robotic arm to grapple the S1 truss structure, remove it from Atlantis' payload bay, and move it to the starboard end the S0 section. Four remotely operated motorized bolts locked the two truss segments together at 8:36 am CDT.

Simultaneously, Astronauts Dave Wolf and Piers Sellers prepared for the mission's first spacewalk. EVA 1 was the 44th spacewalk staged to support the space station assembly and maintenance. The two astronauts exited the Quest Airlock at about 11:21 am EDT. Wolf's spacesuit had solid red stripes for identification, while Sellers donned an all white spacesuit. As Wolf worked to accomplish to connect power, data and fluid lines between the S0 and the S1 trusses, Sellers, on his first spacewalk, released the locks on three folded-up radiators mounted to the S1, allowing S1's radiators to be oriented for optimal cooling.

The spacewalking astronauts worked for seven hours and one minute outside the space station, 31 minutes longer than expected due to a problem with the Canadarm2. The glitch forced Wolf to complete installation of a television camera system on the far end of the truss without the assistance of the robot arm. The only other problem of EVA 1 came near the end of the spacewalk when Wolf reported his helmet earphones appeared to be losing power.

Throughout the spacewalk, astronaut Melroy offered guidance and advice to the spacewalkers and keeping them on schedule. Shuttle Commander Jeff Ashby operated the shuttle robotic arm, providing camera views for documentation. Following a tool inventory check and cleanup activities, Wolf and Sellers re-entered Quest. The Airlock was re-pressurized at 5:22 pm CDT to end EVA 1.

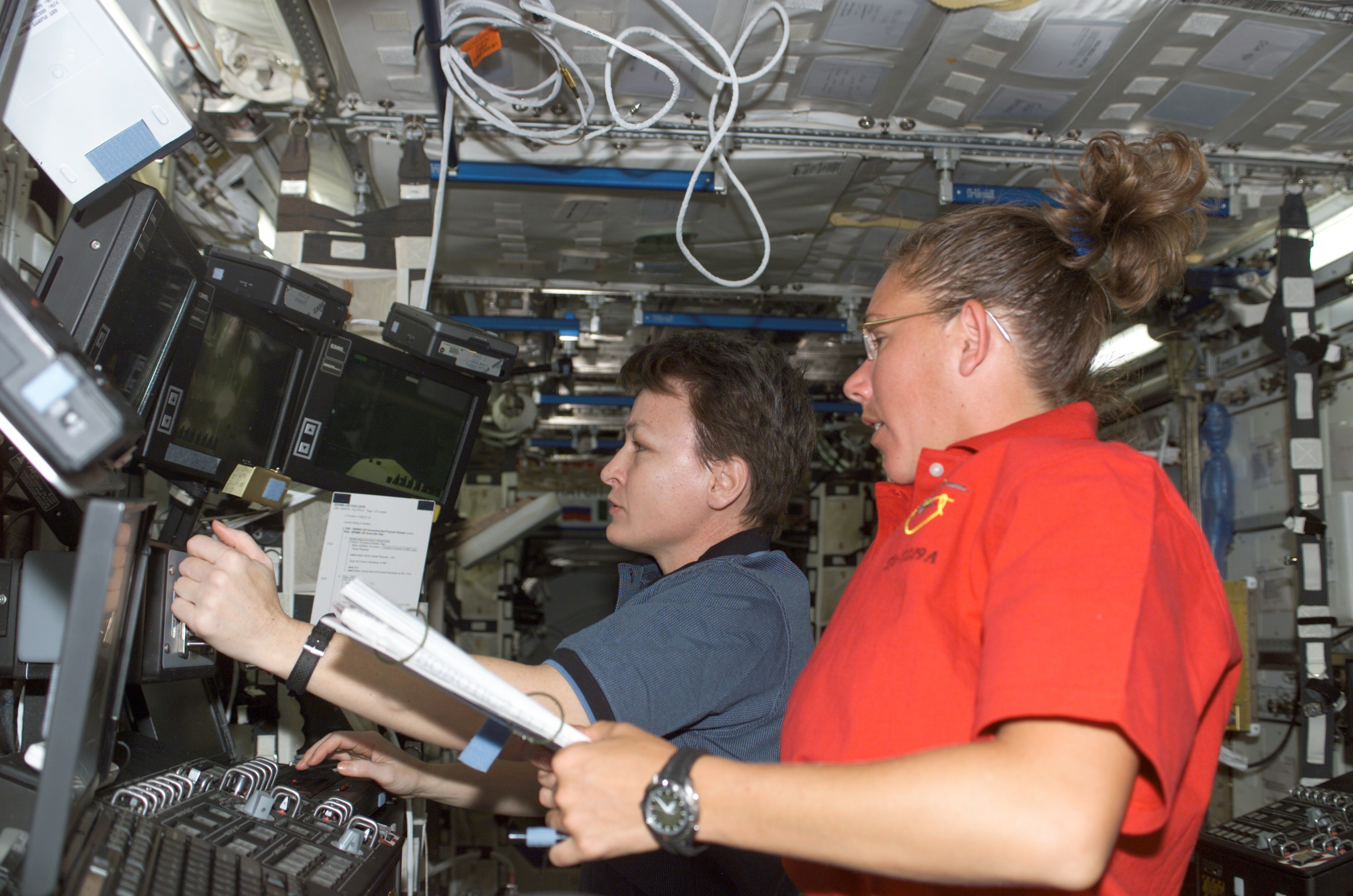
Whitson and Magnus works inside the Destiny Lab to remove S1 truss

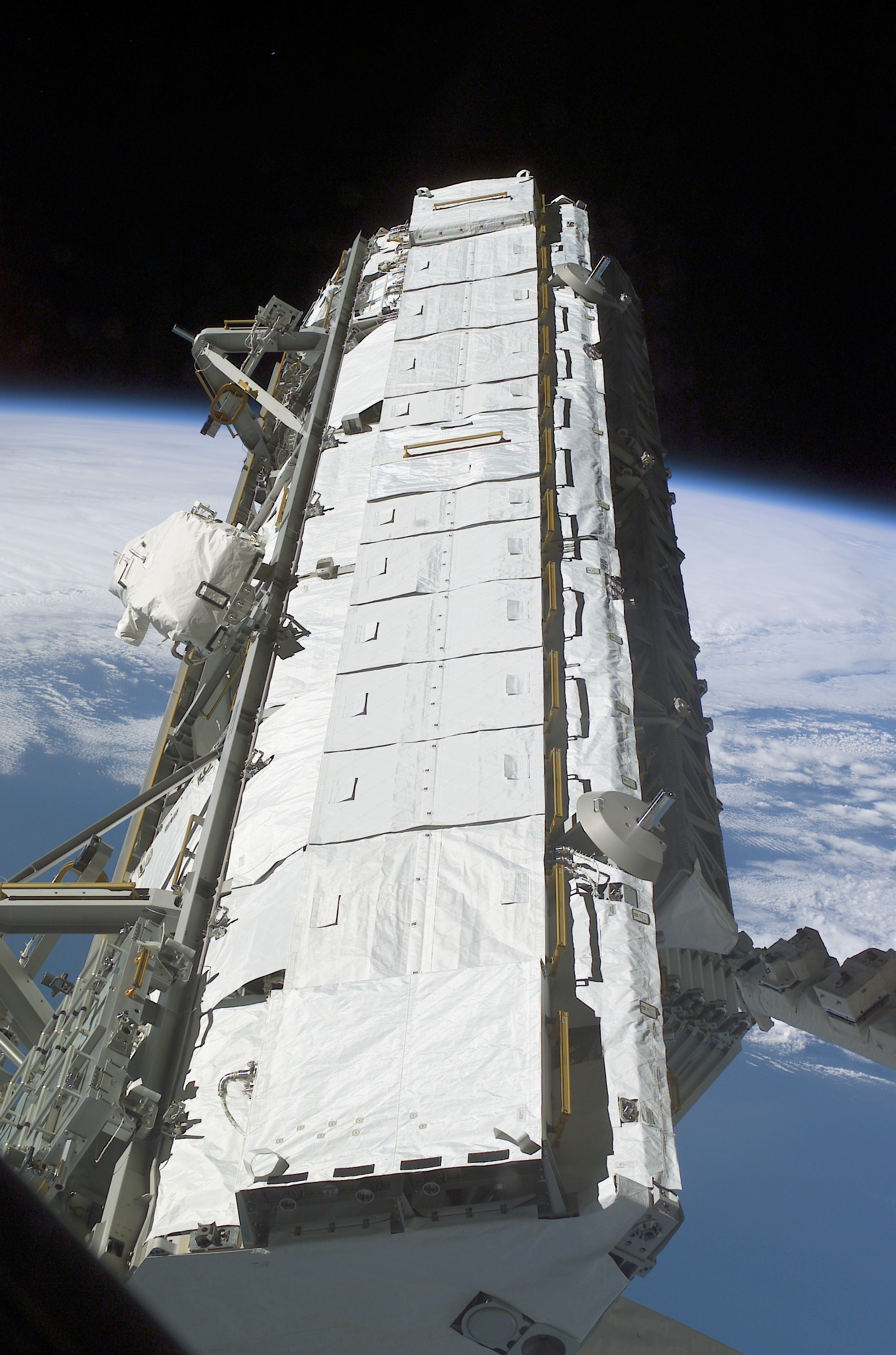
S1 truss is moved from the cargo bay of Atlantis

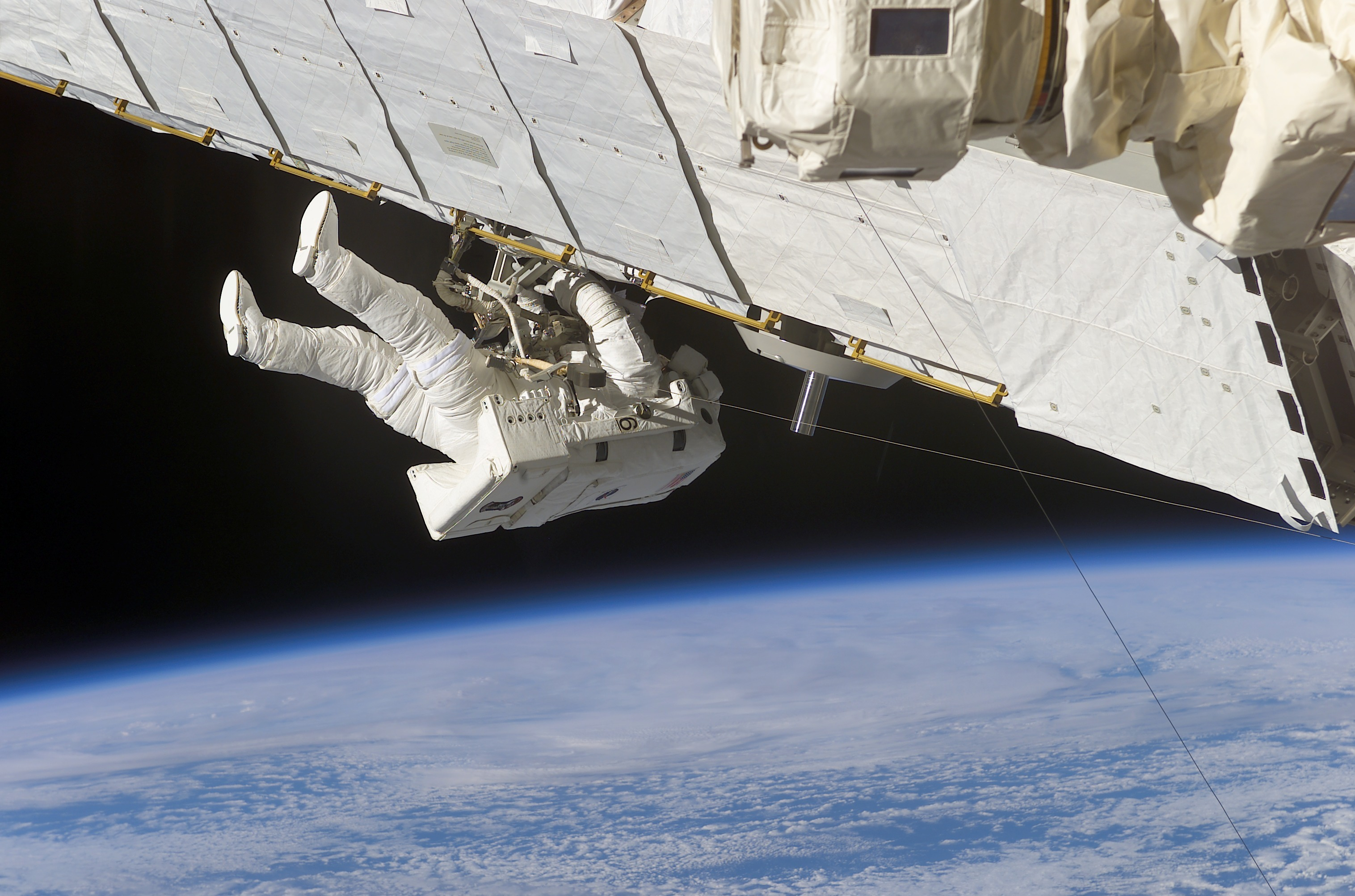
Piers Sellers works on the S1 truss

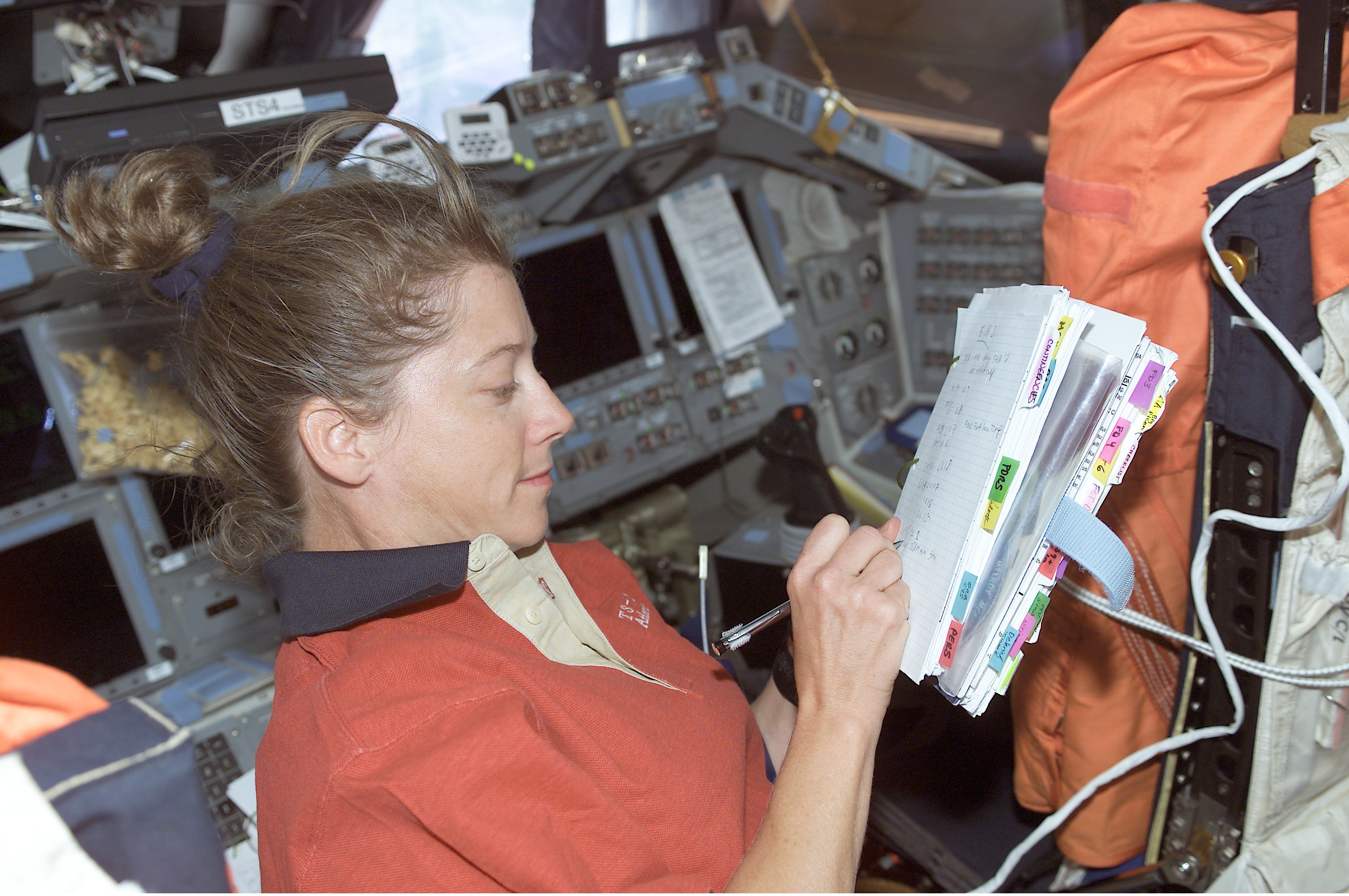
Pamela Melroy looks over a checklist on the flight deck of Atlantis

=== 11 October (Flight Day 5 – Off duty and transfers) ===
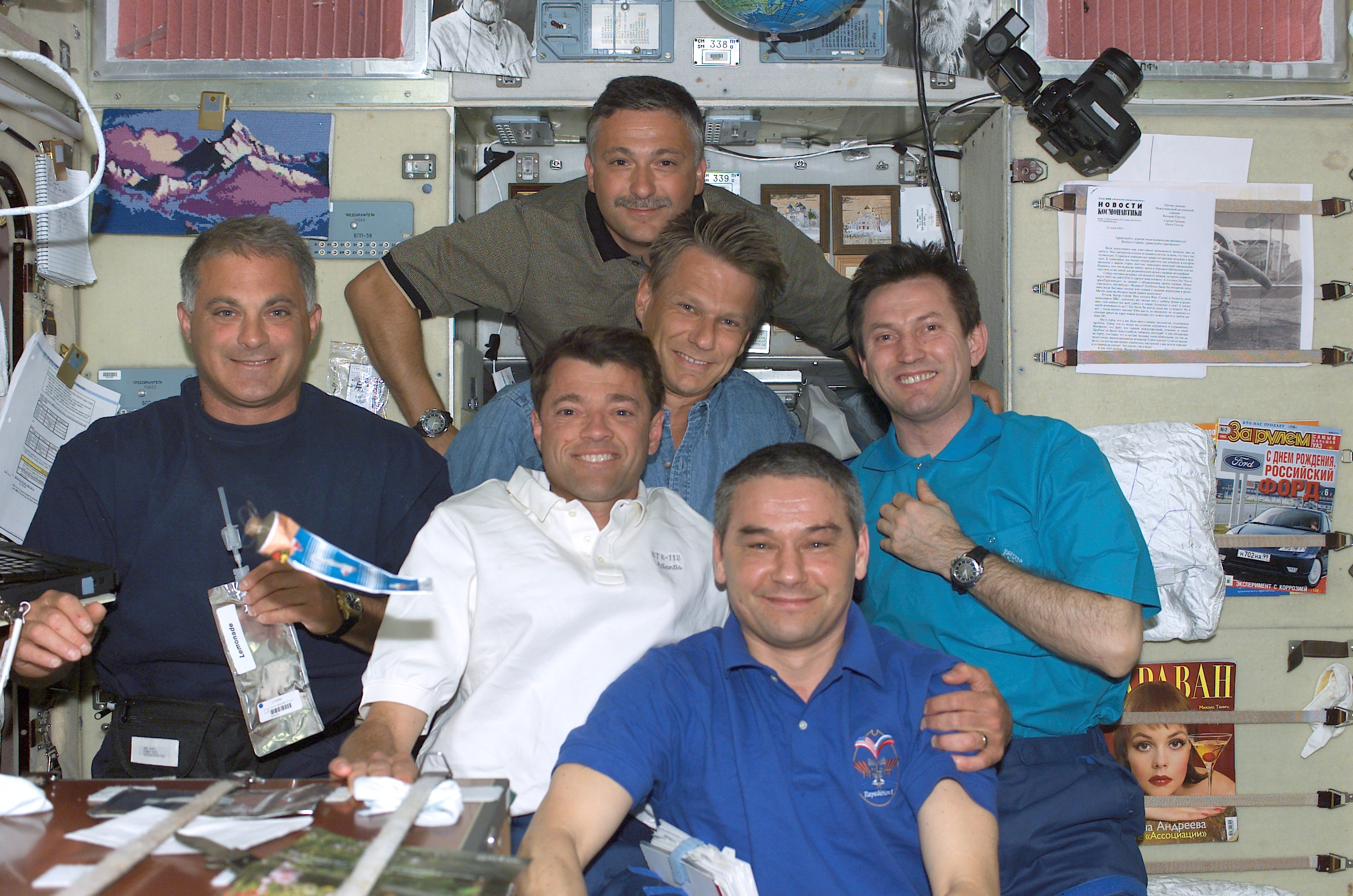
The STS-112 and Expedition 5 crewmembers share a meal in the Zvezda Service Module.

On Flight Day 5, the combined shuttle and space station crew took several hours of off-duty time. Then they began transfer operations between the vehicles and prepared for mission's second spacewalk. The crew moved a number of scientific experiments back and forth between the shuttle and the ISS to return completed experiments to Earth and deploy new experiments at the ISS. Transfer items included a set of liver cell tissue samples from an experiment studying the function of human liver cells in microgravity, moved from the station onto the shuttle for return to Earth.

Payload experiments such as Marshall Space Flight Center's protein crystal growth thermal enclosures for growing high-quality protein crystals in micro-gravity experiments were moved to and from the station. Seven water containers were transferred to the station. Commander Jeff Ashby initiated a Nitrogen transfer process that moved about 15 pounds of the gas from Atlantis to the station by the end of the day.

STS-112 spacewalkers David Wolf and Piers Sellers, assisted by Pilot Pamela Melroy, readied the EVA equipment They recharged water on the extravehicular mobility unit (EMU), configured their tools and prepared the Quest airlock.

The crew also participated in several live media interviews. Astronauts Magnus, Wolf and Sellers discussed about EVA 1 and the first-time experiences in space with CBS Radio Network and Cable News Network (CNN). Speaking to CBS News, Wolf told that manual work Piers and himself did at the end of EVA 1 to install the S1's outboard nadir external camera got their heart rates up to over 170 per minute. The spacewalkers were not able to use the Station's Canadarm 2 as a result of a software glitch.

Russian cosmonauts Valery Korzun, Sergei Treschev and Fyodor Yurchikhin participated in several interviews with the Russian press. Shortly before sleep, the crew reviewed procedures for EVA 2.

=== 18 October (Flight Day 12 – Landing) ===
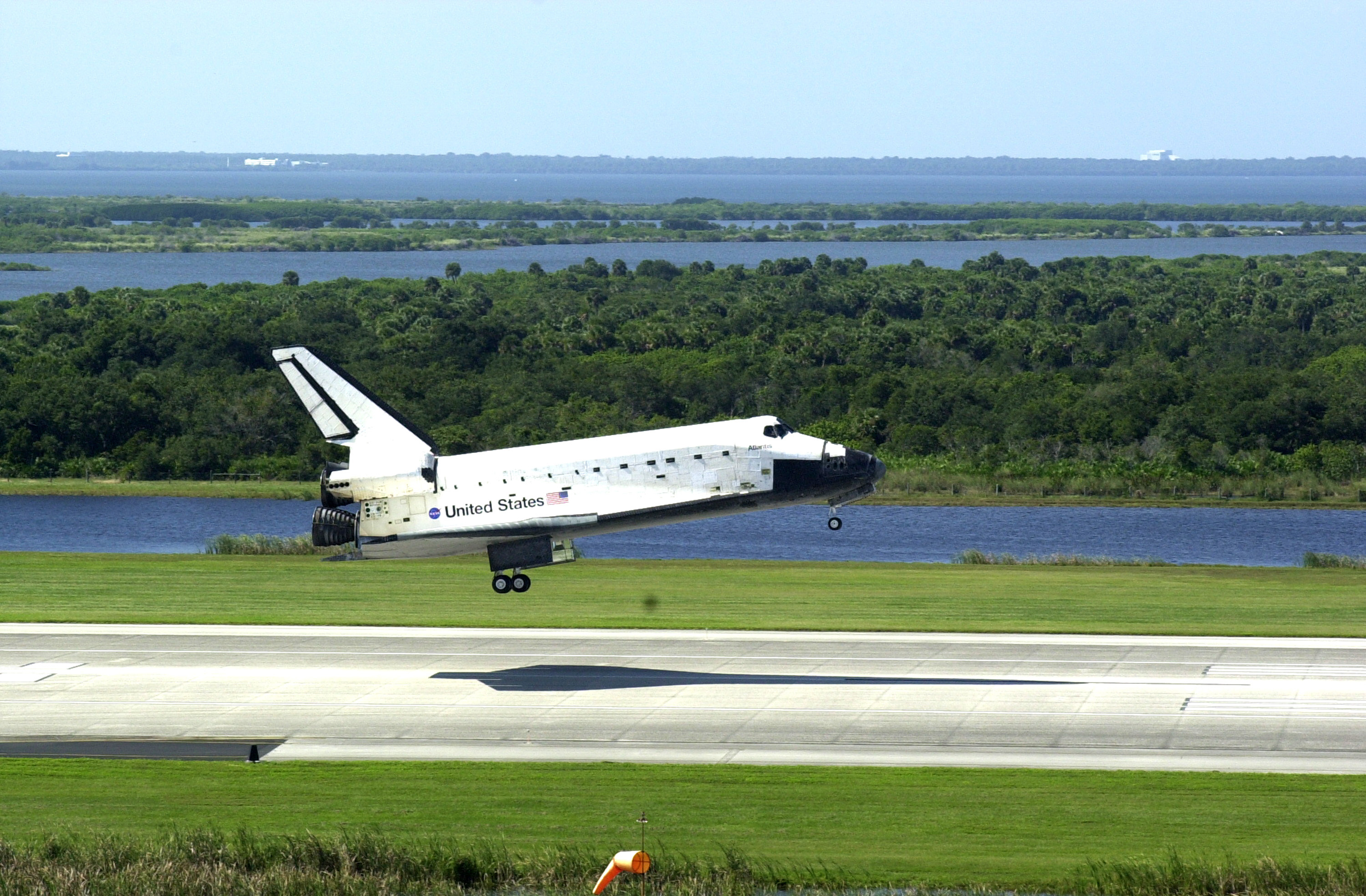
STS-112 lands at the Shuttle Landing Facility, 18 October 2002.

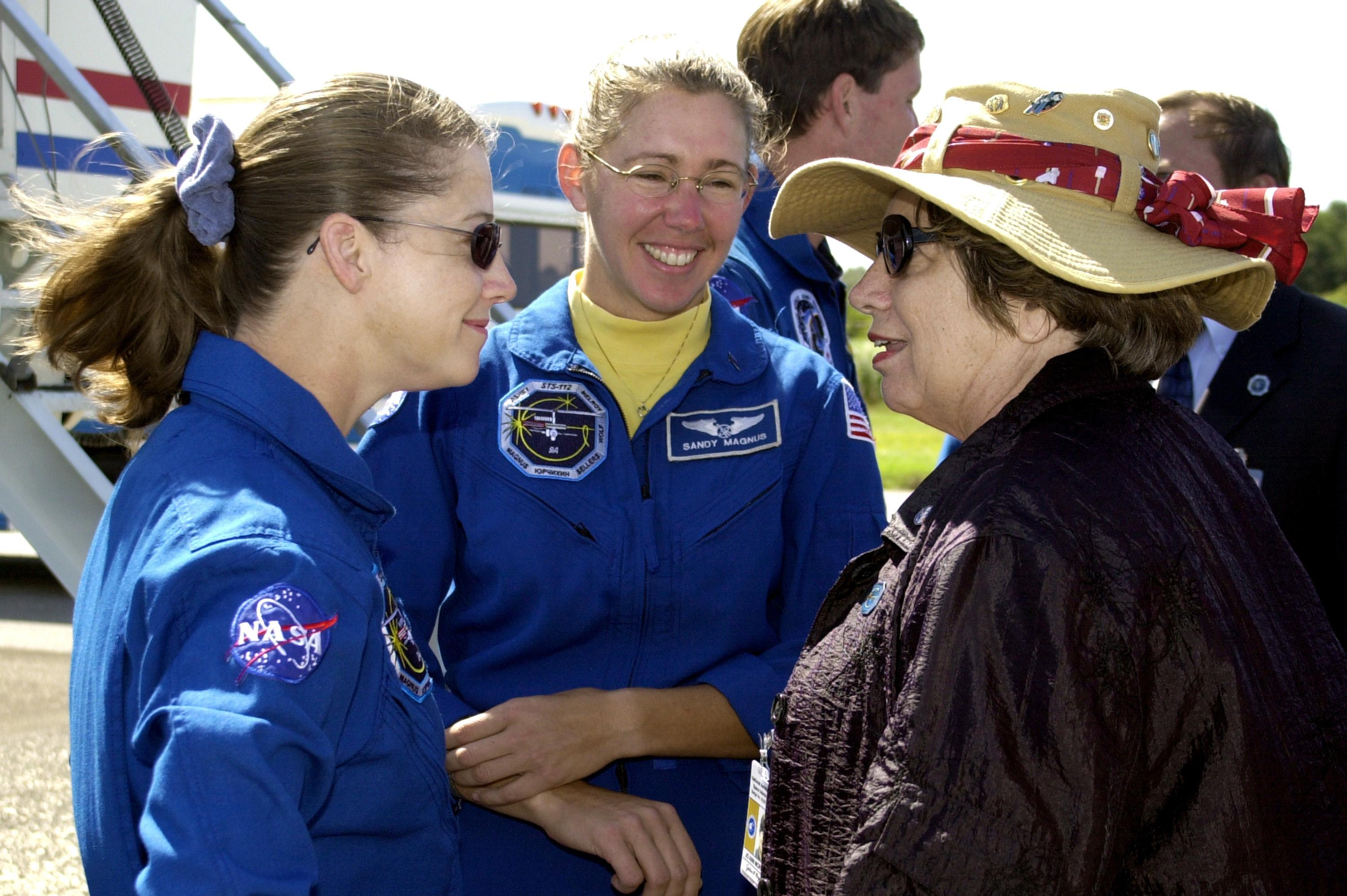
JoAnn H. Morgan (then Director of External Relations and Business Development at KSC) with STS-112 Pilot Pamela Melroy (left) and Mission Specialist Sandra Magnus (center) after the landing of Space Shuttle Atlantis

.

=== Crew seat assignments ===
Seat	Launch	Landing	Seats 1–4 are on the flight deck. Seats 5–7 are on the mid-deck.
1	Ashby		Seats 1–4 are on the flight deck. Seats 5–7 are on the mid-deck.
2	Melroy		Seats 1–4 are on the flight deck. Seats 5–7 are on the mid-deck.
3	Sellers	Wolf	Seats 1–4 are on the flight deck. Seats 5–7 are on the mid-deck.
4	Magnus		Seats 1–4 are on the flight deck. Seats 5–7 are on the mid-deck.
5	Wolf	Sellers	Seats 1–4 are on the flight deck. Seats 5–7 are on the mid-deck.
6	Yurchikhin		Seats 1–4 are on the flight deck. Seats 5–7 are on the mid-deck.
7	Unused		Seats 1–4 are on the flight deck. Seats 5–7 are on the mid-deck.

== Spacewalks ==
EVA	Spacewalkers	Start (UTC)	End	Duration
EVA 1	David A. Wolf; Piers J. Sellers	10 October 2002; 15:21 UTC	10 October 2002; 22:22 UTC	7 hours, 01 minutes
EVA 1	Installed lines between S0 and S1 trusses.			
EVA 2	David A. Wolf; Piers J. Sellers	12 October 2002; 14:31 UTC	12 October 2002; 20:35 UTC	6 hours, 4 minutes
EVA 2	Installed future EVA hardware.			
EVA 3	David A. Wolf; Piers J. Sellers	14 October 2002; 14:08 UTC	14 October 2002; 20:44 UTC	6 hours, 36 minutes
EVA 3	Completed S1 installation.			

== Shuttlecam ==
A camera mounted to the shuttle's external tank captured Atlantis' ascent to orbit. This was the first time such footage was recorded. However, after solid rocket booster separation, the camera was fogged with the propellant, and was rendered unusable. The camera was moved downward after STS-112.

In the response to the Space Shuttle Columbia disaster (STS-107), the camera was also used on all subsequent missions to capture images of the falling debris from the external tank.

== Wake-up calls ==
NASA began a tradition of playing music to astronauts during the Gemini program, which was first used to wake up a flight crew during Apollo 15. Each track is specially chosen, often by their families, and usually has a special meaning to an individual member of the crew, or is applicable to their daily activities.

Flight Day	Song	Artist	Played for	Links
Day 2	"Venus and Mars"	Paul McCartney and Wings	David Wolf	wav
Day 3	"The Best"	Tina Turner	Jeffrey Ashby	wav
Day 4	"(Theme from) The Monkees", "Rocket Man", "Space Oddity", "I am Woman"	The Monkees, Elton John, David Bowie, Helen Reddy	Sandra Magnus	wav
Day 5	"Oh Thou Tupelo"	Wellesley College Choir	Pamela Melroy	wav
Day 6	"Push It"	Garbage	Piers Sellers	wav
Day 7	"The Aviation March"	Hymn of the Moscow Aviation Institute	Fyodor Yurchikhin	wav
Day 8	"You Gave Me the Answer"	Paul McCartney and Wings	David Wolf	wav
Day 9	"Only an Ocean Away"	Sarah Brightman	Sandra Magnus	wav
Day 10	"Prime Time"	The Alan Parsons Project	Pamela Melroy	wav
Day 11	"These Are Days"	10,000 Maniacs	Piers Sellers	wav
Day 12	"Someday Soon"	Suzy Bogguss	Jeffrey Ashby	wav

== Media ==
STS-112 launches from the Kennedy Space Center (2 mins 24 secs)

STS-112 lands at Kennedy Space Center (1 min 39 secs)

== See also ==
- List of human spaceflights
- List of International Space Station spacewalks
- List of Space Shuttle missions
- List of spacewalks and moonwalks 1965–1999
- Outline of space science
