= Diana Merriweather Ashby =

American activist

- Born: March 22, 1963; California, U.S.
- Died: May 2, 1997 (aged 34)
- Known for: Founder of the Melanoma Research Foundation

Diana Christine Merriweather Ashby (March 22, 1963 – May 2, 1997) was an American cancer activist and founder of the Melanoma Research Foundation. Diana Ashby died on May 2, 1997. She was married to NASA Astronaut Jeffrey S. Ashby (Captain, USN, Ret.), sister of American painter Allison Lee Merriweather, and great-granddaughter of American painter, Florence Cornish (1899–1983).
