= Jeffrey Ashby =

American astronaut, aviator and engineer (born 1954)

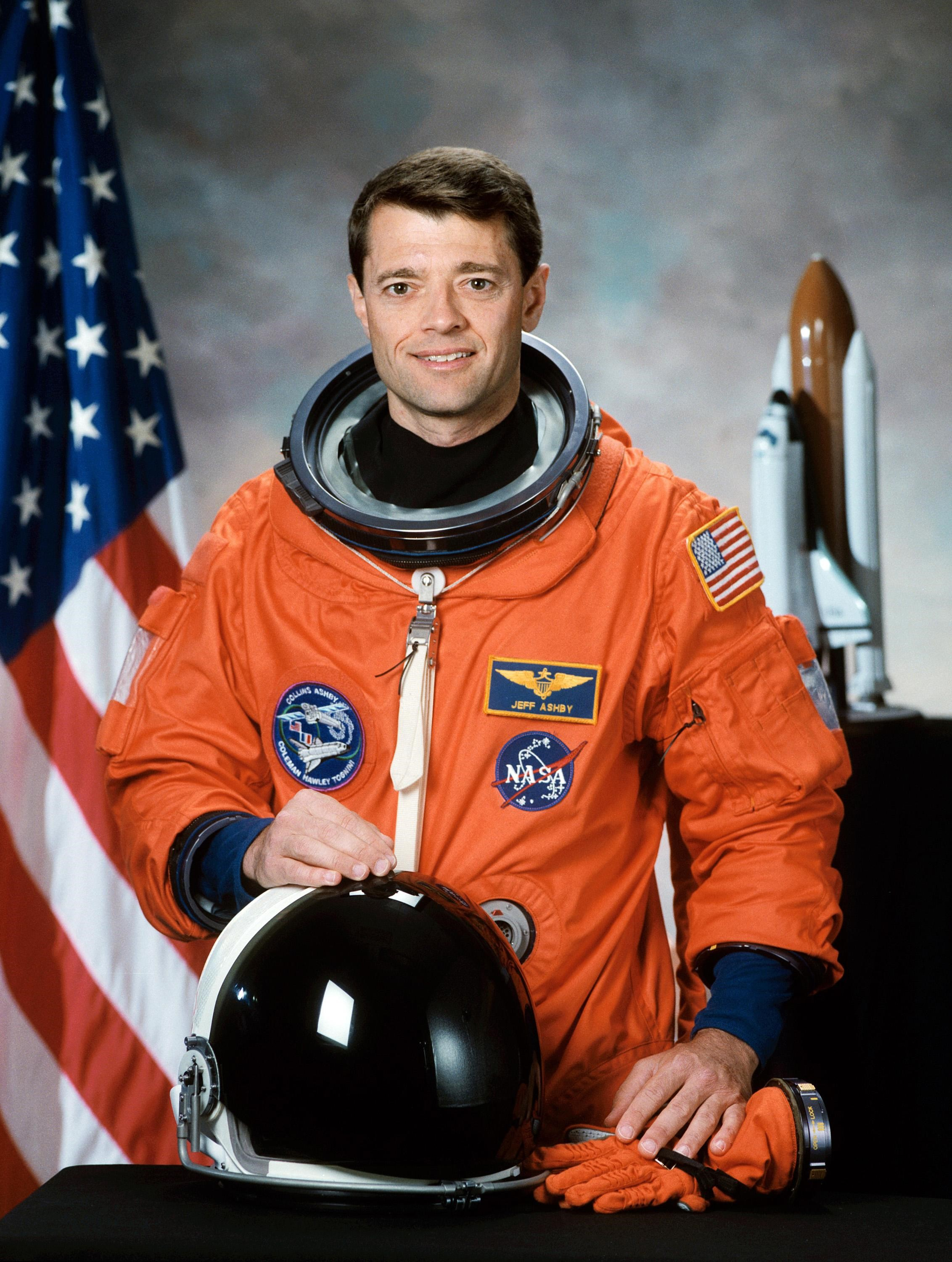
- Born: Jeffrey Shears Ashby; June 16, 1954 (age 72); Dallas, Texas, U.S.
- Education: University of Idaho (BS); University of Tennessee (MS)
- Awards: Distinguished Flying Cross; Air Medal
- Space career

NASA astronaut
- Rank: Captain, USN
- Time in space: 27d 16h 19m
- Selection: NASA Group 15 (1994)
- Missions: STS-93; STS-100; STS-112
- Retired: June 2008

Jeffrey Shears Ashby (born June 16, 1954) is an American mechanical engineer, and former naval officer and aviator, test pilot and NASA astronaut, a veteran of three Space Shuttle missions. He is a retired Captain in the U.S. Navy. He currently works for Blue Origin as chief of mission assurance.

== Early life and education ==
Jeff Ashby was born on June 16, 1954, in Dallas, Texas, and grew up in Evergreen, Colorado, southwest of Denver. He graduated from Evergreen High School in 1972. He attended the University of Idaho as a member of the school's joint Navy Reserve Officer Training Corps (NROTC) program, earning a Bachelor of Science degree in mechanical engineering in 1976. He later earned a Master of Science degree in aviation systems from the University of Tennessee in 1993.

== Naval career ==
Ashby is a 1986 graduate of the Navy Fighter Weapons School, also known as "TOPGUN", and the U.S. Naval Test Pilot School. As a test pilot in the U.S. Navy, Ashby helped develop the F/A-18 aircraft and flew the aircraft in combat missions as part of Operation Desert Storm and Operation Southern Watch during and after the Gulf War and as part of Operation Continue Hope in Somalia. He was the Navy Attack Aviator of the Year in 1991. Ashby commanded a Fighter Squadron stationed aboard the aircraft carrier USS Abraham Lincoln; in 1994, his squadron was designated the top F/A-18 squadron in the Navy.

During Desert Storm while based on the USS Midway (CV-41), Ashby became the first F/A-18 pilot to deploy the Walleye TV guided bomb in combat. During that mission, his F/A-18A Hornet from VFA-195 deployed a Walleye II to attack a T-shaped building at Umm Qasr Naval Base. According to him, it was also the first time that his Air Wing (Carrier Air Wing 5) had used the Walleye in combat.

Later in the war, on February 13, 1991, Ashby and his wingman found and destroyed a camouflaged Iraqi Super Frelon helicopter which had been armed with Exocet cruise missiles that could've attacked the Midway. Ashby released a Walleye I into the helicopter and brought back TV footage of the attack back to Midway. This allowed the Persian Gulf carriers to move closer to Kuwait. After the war, the aircraft he flew on the Super Frelon strike (NF-104), was displayed at NAF Atsugi in Japan in May 1991.

Ashby accumulated over 7,000 flight hours and 1,000 carrier landings during six aircraft carrier deployments in his Navy career.

== NASA career ==
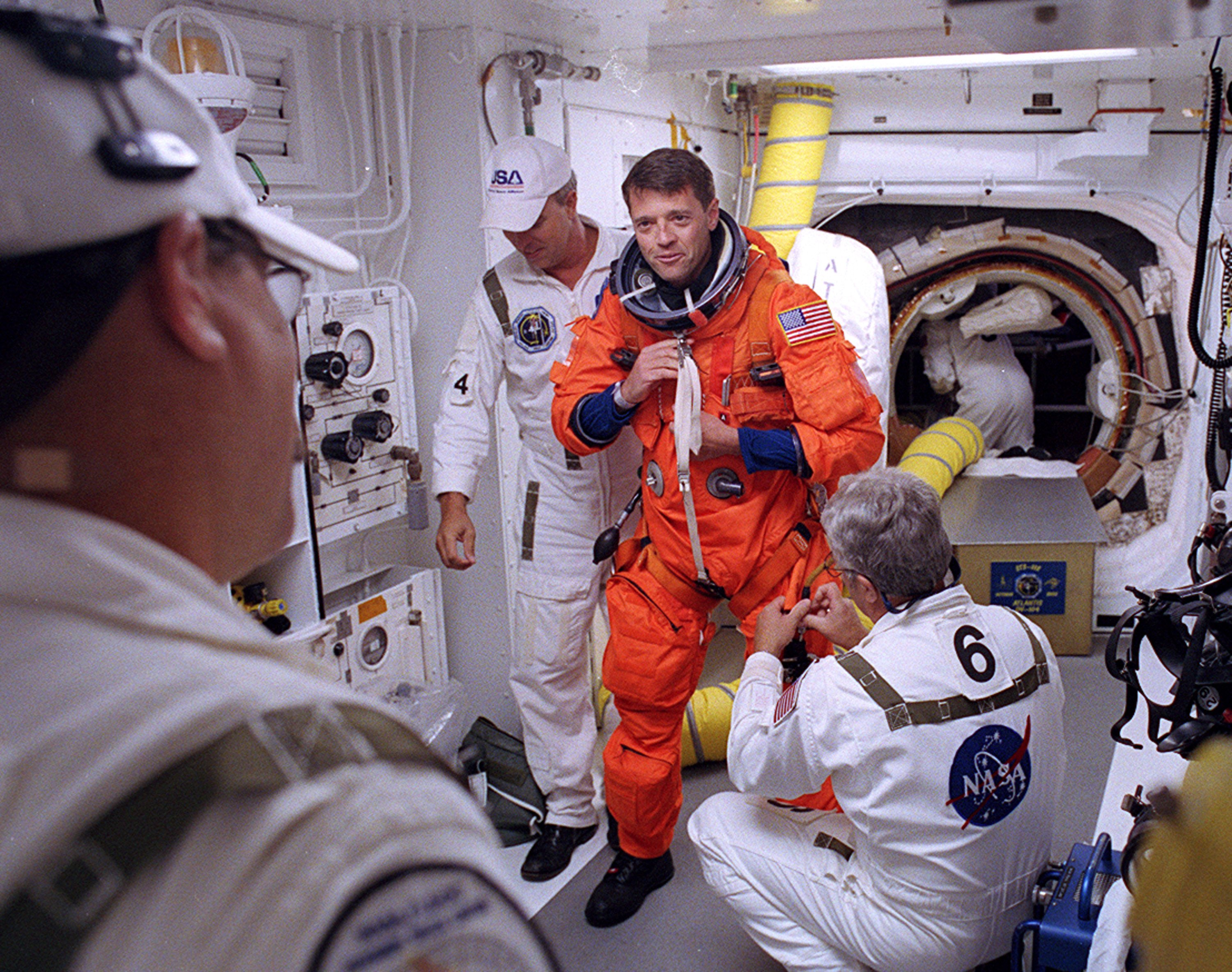
Ashby preparing for launch of STS-112

Ashby was selected as an astronaut candidate in December 1994 at age 40. He was initially scheduled to be the pilot on STS-85 in 1997 but was replaced due to a family illness. He piloted Space Shuttle missions STS-93 in July 1999 and STS-100 in April 2001, and commanded STS-112 in October 2002.

His first flight, aboard Columbia, deployed the Chandra X-ray Observatory. Ashby's latter two flights aboard Endeavour and Atlantis were the sixth and ninth assembly missions for the International Space Station. He has traveled over 11 million miles, flown 436 orbits around the Earth, and logged over 660 hours (27.5 days) in space.

== Post-NASA career ==
Ashby was hired by Jeff Bezos's private spaceflight company Blue Origin as the Chief of Mission Assurance, where he works to assure safety for human space flight. He lives in Twin Lakes, Lake County, Colorado.

On July 15, 2019, Ashby sustained severe injuries after falling 500 feet near the summit of La Plata Peak mountain. He was located later that night and transported to the hospital after being recovered the following morning.

== Awards and decorations ==
- Defense Superior Service Medal
- Legion of Merit
- Distinguished Flying Cross
- Defense Meritorious Service Medal
- Meritorious Service Medal
- Navy Air Medal (4x)
- Navy Commendation Medal (2x)
- Navy Achievement Medal
- Navy Attack Aviator of the Year (1991)
- NASA Outstanding Leadership Medal
- NASA Exceptional Service Medal
- NASA Space Flight Medal (3x)
