= Lenny Young =

American film producer (born 1963)

Lenny Young (born December 15, 1963) in Gary, Indiana, is an American film producer. Young collaborated for many years with film producer Jake Eberts where he produced The Education of Little Tree, Grey Owl, Chicken Run and Snow in August.
