= 1913 in the United States =

- Decades: 1890s; 1900s; 1910s; 1920s; 1930s
- See also: History of the United States (1865–1918); Timeline of United States history (1900–1929); List of years in the United States

Events from the year 1913 in the United States.

== Incumbents ==
=== Federal government ===
- President:

William Howard Taft (R-Ohio) (until March 4)
Woodrow Wilson (D-New Jersey) (starting March 4)

- Vice President:

vacant (until March 4)
Thomas R. Marshall (D-Indiana) (starting March 4)

- Chief Justice: Edward Douglass White (Louisiana)
- Speaker of the House of Representatives: Champ Clark (D-Missouri)
- Congress: 62nd (until March 4), 63rd (starting March 4)

==== State governments ====
Governors and lieutenant governors

=== Governors ===
- Governor of Alabama: Emmet O'Neal (Democratic)
- Governor of Arizona: George W. P. Hunt (Democratic)
- Governor of Arkansas:
  - until January 16: George Washington Donaghey (Democratic)
  - January 16-March 8: Joseph Taylor Robinson (Democratic)
  - March 8-13: William K. Oldham (Democratic)
  - March 13-August 6: Junius Marion Futrell (Democratic)
  - starting August 6: George Washington Hays (Democratic)
- Governor of California: Hiram Johnson (Republican)
- Governor of Colorado: John F. Shafroth (Democratic) (until January 14), Elias M. Ammons (Democratic) (starting January 14)
- Governor of Connecticut: Simeon E. Baldwin (Democratic)
- Governor of Delaware: Simeon S. Pennewill (Republican) (until January 21), Charles R. Miller (Republican) (starting January 21)
- Governor of Florida: Albert W. Gilchrist (Democratic) (until January 7), Park Trammell (Democratic) (starting January 7)
- Governor of Georgia: Joseph M. Brown (Democratic) (until June 28), John M. Slaton (Democratic) (starting June 28)
- Governor of Idaho: James H. Hawley (Democratic) (until January 6), John M. Haines (Republican) (starting January 6)
- Governor of Illinois: Charles S. Deneen (Republican) (until February 3), Edward F. Dunne (Democratic) (starting February 3)
- Governor of Indiana: Thomas R. Marshall (Democratic) (until January 13), Samuel M. Ralston (Democratic) (starting January 13)
- Governor of Iowa: Beryl F. Carroll (Republican) (until January 16), George W. Clarke (Republican) (starting January 16)
- Governor of Kansas: Walter R. Stubbs (Republican) (until January 13), George H. Hodges (Democratic) (starting January 13)
- Governor of Kentucky: James B. McCreary (Democratic)
- Governor of Louisiana: Luther Egbert Hall (Democratic)
- Governor of Maine: Frederick W. Plaisted (Democratic) (until January 1), William T. Haines (Republican) (starting January 1)
- Governor of Maryland: Phillips Lee Goldsborough (Republican)
- Governor of Massachusetts: Eugene Noble Foss (Democratic)
- Governor of Michigan: Chase Osborn (Republican) (until January 1), Woodbridge N. Ferris (Democratic) (starting January 1)
- Governor of Minnesota: Adolph O. Eberhart (Republican)
- Governor of Mississippi: Earl L. Brewer (Democratic)
- Governor of Missouri: Herbert S. Hadley (Republican) (until January 13), Elliot Woolfolk Major (Democratic) (starting January 13)
- Governor of Montana: Edwin L. Norris (Democratic) (until January 5), Sam V. Stewart (Democratic) (starting January 6)
- Governor of Nebraska: Chester H. Aldrich (Republican) (until January 9), John H. Morehead (Democratic) (starting January 9)
- Governor of Nevada: Tasker L. Oddie (Republican)
- Governor of New Hampshire: Robert P. Bass (Republican) (until January 2), Samuel D. Felker (Democratic) (starting January 2)
- Governor of New Jersey:
  - until March 1: Woodrow Wilson (Democratic)
  - March 1-October 28: James Fairman Fielder (Democratic)
  - starting October 28: Leon R. Taylor (Democratic)
- Governor of New Mexico: William C. McDonald (Democratic)
- Governor of New York: William Sulzer (Democratic) (January 1 – October 17); Martin H. Glynn (Democratic) (starting October 17)
- Governor of North Carolina: William W. Kitchin (Democratic) (until January 15), Locke Craig (Democratic) (starting January 15)
- Governor of North Dakota: John Burke (Democratic) (until January 8), L. B. Hanna (Republican) (starting January 8)
- Governor of Ohio: Judson Harmon (Democratic) (until January 13), James M. Cox (Democratic) (starting January 13)
- Governor of Oklahoma: Lee Cruce (Democratic)
- Governor of Oregon: Oswald West (Democratic)
- Governor of Pennsylvania: John K. Tener (Republican)
- Governor of Rhode Island: Aram J. Pothier (Republican)
- Governor of South Carolina: Coleman Livingston Blease (Democratic)
- Governor of South Dakota: Robert S. Vessey (Republican) (until January 7), Frank M. Byrne (Republican) (starting January 7)
- Governor of Tennessee: Ben W. Hooper (Republican)
- Governor of Texas: Oscar Branch Colquitt (Democratic)
- Governor of Utah: William Spry (Republican)
- Governor of Vermont: Allen M. Fletcher (Republican)
- Governor of Virginia: William Hodges Mann (Democratic) (until February 1), Henry Carter Stuart (Democratic) (starting February 1)
- Governor of Washington: Marion E. Hay (Republican) (until January 15), Ernest Lister (Democratic) (starting January 15)
- Governor of West Virginia: William E. Glasscock (Republican) (until March 14), Henry D. Hatfield (Republican) (starting March 14)
- Governor of Wisconsin: Francis E. McGovern (Republican)
- Governor of Wyoming: Joseph M. Carey (Democratic)

=== Lieutenant governors ===
- Lieutenant Governor of Alabama: Walter D. Seed, Sr. (Democratic)
- Lieutenant Governor of California: A. J. Wallace (Republican)
- Lieutenant Governor of Colorado: Stephen R. Fitzgarrald (Democratic)
- Lieutenant Governor of Connecticut: Dennis A. Blakeslee (Republican) (until month and day unknown), Lyman T. Tingier (Democratic) (starting month and day unknown)
- Lieutenant Governor of Delaware: John M. Mendinhall (Republican) (until January 21), Colen Ferguson (Democratic) (starting January 21)
- Lieutenant Governor of Idaho: Lewis H. Sweetser (Republican) (until January 6), Herman H. Taylor (Republican) (starting January 6)
- Lieutenant Governor of Illinois: John G. Oglesby (Republican) (until February 3), Barratt O'Hara (Democratic) (starting February 3)
- Lieutenant Governor of Indiana: Frank J. Hall (Democratic) (until January 13), William P. O'Neill (Democratic) (starting January 13)
- Lieutenant Governor of Iowa: George W. Clarke (Republican) (until January 16), William L. Harding (Republican) (starting January 16)
- Lieutenant Governor of Kansas: Richard Joseph Hopkins (Republican) (until January 13), Sheffield Ingalls (Republican) (starting January 13)
- Lieutenant Governor of Kentucky: Edward J. McDermott (Democratic)
- Lieutenant Governor of Louisiana: Thomas C. Barret (Democratic)
- Lieutenant Governor of Massachusetts: Robert Luce (Republican) (until month and day unknown), David I. Walsh (Democratic) (starting month and day unknown)
- Lieutenant Governor of Michigan: John Q. Ross (Republican)
- Lieutenant Governor of Minnesota: Samuel Y. Gordon (Republican) (until January 7), Joseph A. A. Burnquist (Republican) (starting January 7)
- Lieutenant Governor of Mississippi: Theodore G. Bilbo (Democratic)
- Lieutenant Governor of Missouri: Jacob Friedrich Gmelich (Republican) (until January 13), William Rock Painter (Democratic) (starting January 13)
- Lieutenant Governor of Montana: William R. Allen (Republican) (until month and day unknown), W. W. McDowell (Democratic) (starting month and day unknown)
- Lieutenant Governor of Nebraska: vacant (until January 9), Samuel R. McKelvie (Republican) (starting January 9)
- Lieutenant Governor of Nevada: Gilbert C. Ross (Democratic)
- Lieutenant Governor of New Mexico: Ezequiel Cabeza De Baca (Democratic)
- Lieutenant Governor of New York: Martin H. Glynn (Democratic) (until October 17), Robert F. Wagner (Democratic) (starting October 17)
- Lieutenant Governor of North Carolina: William C. Newland (Democratic) (until January 15), Elijah L. Daughtridge (Democratic) (starting January 15)
- Lieutenant Governor of North Dakota: Usher L. Burdick (Republican) (until January 8), Anton T. Kraabel (Republican) (starting January 8)
- Lieutenant Governor of Ohio: Hugh L. Nichols (Democratic) (until January 13), W. A. Greenlund (Democratic) (starting January 13)
- Lieutenant Governor of Oklahoma: J. J. McAlester (Democratic)
- Lieutenant Governor of Pennsylvania: John M. Reynolds (Republican)
- Lieutenant Governor of Rhode Island: Zenas Work Bliss (Republican) (until month and day unknown), Roswell B. Burchard (Republican) (starting month and day unknown)
- Lieutenant Governor of South Carolina: Charles Aurelius Smith (Democratic)
- Lieutenant Governor of South Dakota: Frank M. Byrne (Republican) (until January 8), Edward Lincoln Abel (Republican) (starting January 8)
- Lieutenant Governor of Tennessee: Nathaniel Baxter, Jr. (Democratic) (until month and day unknown), Newton H. White (Democratic) (starting month and day unknown)
- Lieutenant Governor of Texas: Asbury Bascom Davidson (Democratic) (until January 20), William Harding Mayes (Democratic) (starting January 20)
- Lieutenant Governor of Vermont: Frank E. Howe (Republican)
- Lieutenant Governor of Virginia: James Taylor Ellyson (Democratic)
- Lieutenant Governor of Washington: vacant (until January 11), Louis Folwell Hart (Republican) (starting January 11)
- Lieutenant Governor of Wisconsin: Thomas Morris (Republican)

== Events ==
=== January–March ===
March 4: Woodrow Wilson becomes the 28th U.S. president

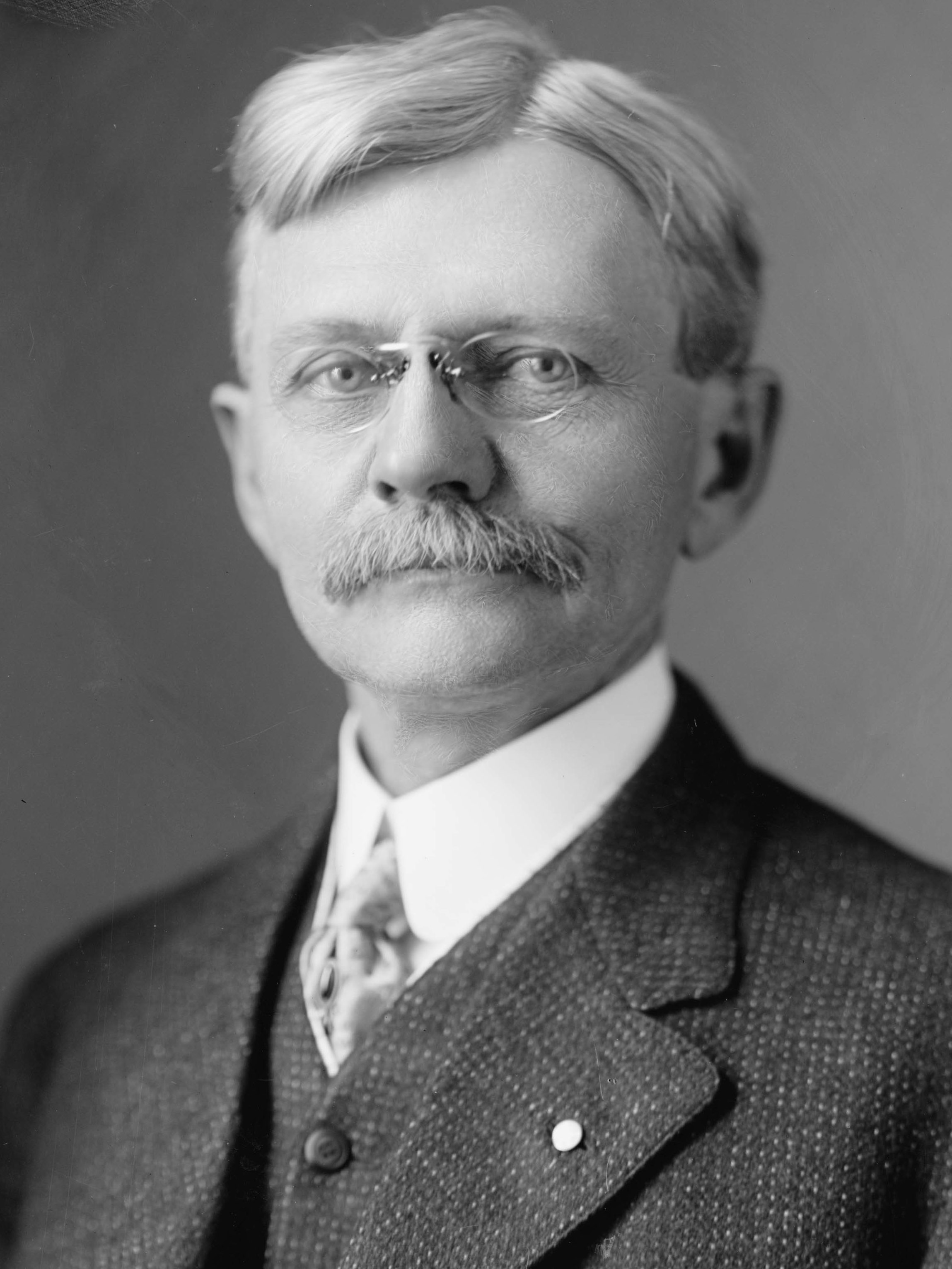
Thomas R. Marshall becomes the 28th U.S. vice president

- January – The magazine Vanity Fair is launched in New York City by Condé Montrose Nast.
- February 2 – New York City's Grand Central Terminal, having been rebuilt, reopens as the world's largest train station.
- February 3 – The Sixteenth Amendment to the United States Constitution is ratified, authorizing the Federal government to impose and collect income taxes.
- February 17 – The Armory Show opens in New York City. It displays the works of artists who are to become some of the most influential painters of the early twentieth century.
- March 3 – The Woman Suffrage Procession takes place in Washington, D.C., initiated and organized by Alice Paul and led by Inez Milholland on horseback.
- March 4
  - Woodrow Wilson is sworn in as the 28th president of the United States, and Thomas R. Marshall is sworn in as the 28th vice president.
  - The U.S. Department of Commerce and U.S. Department of Labor are established by splitting the duties of the 10-year-old Department of Commerce and Labor. The Census Bureau, U.S. Bureau of Fisheries and U.S. Coast and Geodetic Survey form part of the Department of Commerce.
  - The first U.S. law regulating the shooting of migratory birds is passed.
- March 7 – The British freighter Alum Chine, carrying 343 tons of dynamite, explodes in Baltimore harbor.
- March 13 – Mexican Revolution: Pancho Villa returns to Mexico from his self-imposed exile in the United States.
- March 25 – Great Dayton Flood: Four days of rain in the Miami Valley flood the region and mark the worst natural disaster in Ohio's recorded history, killing over 360 people and destroying 20,000 homes, chiefly in Dayton.

=== April–June ===
- April 5 – The United States Soccer Federation is formed.
- April 8 – The Seventeenth Amendment to the United States Constitution is passed, dictating the direct election of senators.
- April 24 – The Woolworth Building opens in New York City. Designed by Cass Gilbert, it is the tallest building in the world at this date and for more than a decade after.
- April 26 – Mary Phagan is raped and strangled on the premises of the National Pencil Factory in Atlanta. Leo Frank is tried and convicted for the crime.
- May – The Paul Émile Chabas painting September Morn provokes a charge of indecency when displayed in the window of a Chicago art gallery.
- May 1 – The Sherwood Hotel opens in Greene, NY.
- May 14 – New York Governor William Sulzer approves the charter for the Rockefeller Foundation, which begins operations with a $100 million donation from John D. Rockefeller.
- June 13 – An International Railway (New York – Ontario) trolley and passengers are buried under the contents of an overhead garbage chute that breaks in Niagara Falls, New York.
- June 15 – Battle of Bud Bagsak in the Philippines concludes with U.S. troops under General John J. Pershing taking Bug Bagsak from defending Moro rebels, killing at least 500.

=== July–September ===
- July 3 – The fiftieth anniversary of the Battle of Gettysburg draws thousands of American Civil War veterans and their families to Gettysburg, Pennsylvania.
- July 10 – The temperature in Death Valley, California, hits 134 °F (~56.7 °C), the highest recorded in the U.S. (as of 2021).
- August 3 – Strike action by agricultural workers in Wheatland, California, degenerates into the "Wheatland hop riot", one of the first major farm labor confrontations in the state.
- September 8 – The largest commercial office building in the world opens in Saint Louis, Missouri, to great fanfare. The Railroad Exchange building houses 31 acres under one roof, and its central tenant, Famous-Barr Co., becomes the world's largest department store with over 1,500,000 square feet.
- September 19 – Francis Ouimet wins the U.S. Open (golf) championship by five strokes, becoming the first amateur to ever win the event.

=== October–December ===
- October 3 – The United States Revenue Act of 1913 re-imposes the federal income tax and lowers basic tariff rates from 40% to 25%.
- October 7–December 1 – The Ford Motor Company adopts a moving assembly line for chassis production of the Model T at its Highland Park Plant in Highland Park, Michigan (Detroit), reducing assembly time from 12½ hours to 2 hours 40 minutes, a landmark in mass production. Between 1912 and 1914 the retail price of a Model T drops by $150.
- October 10 – President Woodrow Wilson triggers the explosion of the Gamboa Dike, ending construction on the Panama Canal.
- October 11 – The Philadelphia Athletics win the deciding game of the 1913 World Series, over baseball's New York Giants, winning 3–1 to take the series in five games.
- October 31
  - Indianapolis Streetcar Strike of 1913: Public transport employees in Indianapolis go on strike, shutting down mass transit in the city and sparking riots when strikebreakers attempt to restart services.
  - The Lincoln Highway, the first automobile road across the United States, is dedicated.
- November 7–11 – The Great Lakes Storm of 1913 kills more than 250.
- November 26 – Phi Sigma Sigma, the first non-sectarian sorority, is founded at Hunter College in New York.
- December 19 – The Raker Act is signed by President Woodrow Wilson, allowing the City of San Francisco to dam Hetch Hetchy Valley in Yosemite National Park.
- December 21 – Arthur Wynne's "word-cross", the first crossword puzzle, is published in the New York World.
- December 23 – The Federal Reserve is created by Woodrow Wilson.
- December 24 – Italian Hall disaster: 73 people are killed in a stampede at the Italian Hall in Calumet, Michigan (59 of them children) during a party for over 400 miners and their families involved in the Copper Country strike of 1913–14.

=== Undated ===
- The two cities of "Winston" and "Salem" in North Carolina officially merge to become Winston-Salem.
- Portuguese emigration to the Hawaiian Islands (1878–1913) ends.
- The National Temperance Council is founded to promote the temperance movement.
- R. J. Reynolds introduces Camel, the first packaged cigarette.
- First Erector Set construction toy marketed.
- Louis Armstrong begins playing the cornet, in the band of the New Orleans Home for Colored Waifs.
- The Bureau of Commercial Economics, founded in Philadelphia, was one of the largest film libraries in its day and the only one that was international.
- The United States Mint issues the first buffalo nickel.

=== Ongoing ===
- Progressive Era (1890s–1920s)
- Lochner era (c. 1897–c. 1937)

== Births ==
Richard Nixon, 37th president of the United States (1969–1974)

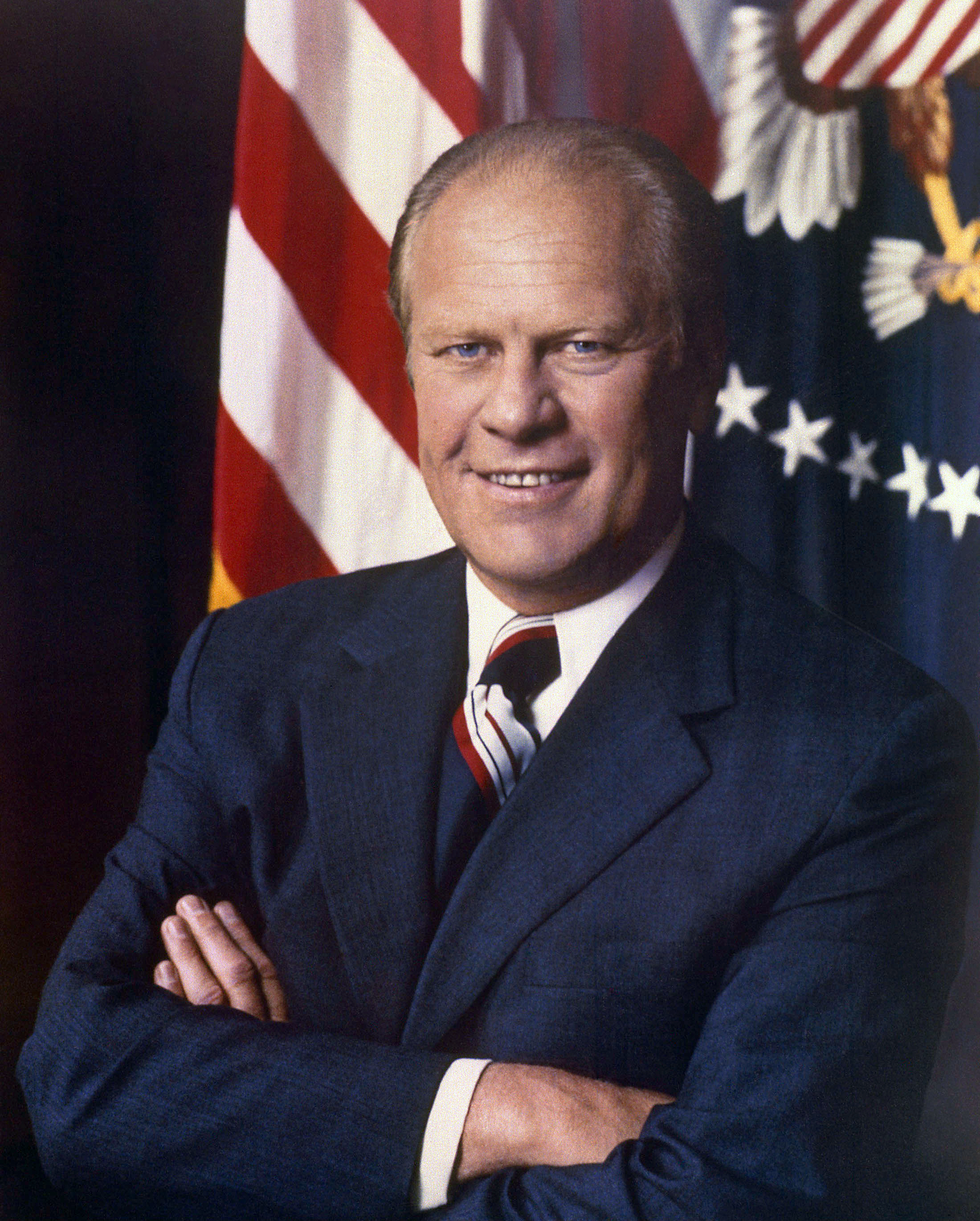
Gerald Ford, 38th president of the United States (1974–1977)

Two U.S. presidents (who also served as Vice President) were born in the year 1913
- January 1 – Norman Rosten, poet, playwright and novelist (died 1995)
- January 6 – Loretta Young, actress (died 2000)
- January 7
  - Victor H. Krulak, United States Marine Corps general (died 2008)
  - Johnny Mize, baseball player (died 1993)
- January 9 – Richard Nixon, 37th president of the United States from 1969 to 1974, 36th vice president of the United States from 1953 to 1961 (died 1994)
- January 11 – Jean Murrell Capers, judge (died 2017)
- January 15 – Lloyd Bridges, film and television actor (died 1998)
- January 17 – Everett Parker, civil rights activist (died 2015)
- January 20 – W. Cleon Skousen, author and academic (died 2006)
- January 23 – Wally Parks, founder of the NHRA (died 2007)
- January 29 – Victor Mature, film actor (died 1999)
- January 31 – Murray Bowen, psychiatrist, pioneer of family therapy (died 1990)
- February 4
  - Frank P. Keller, film editor (died 1977)
  - Rosa Parks, African American Civil Rights activist (died 2005)
- February 8
  - Norman H. Boke, plant anatomist (died 1996)
- February 14
  - Mel Allen, sports reporter (died 1996)
  - Woody Hayes, college football coach (died 1987)
  - Jimmy Hoffa, labor union leader (died 1975)
- February 20 – Tommy Henrich, baseball player (died 2009)
- February 27 – Irwin Shaw, playwright, screenwriter and novelist (died 1984)
- March 7 – Gordon Willey, archaeologist (died 2002)
- March 12 – Loulie Jean Norman, singer (died 2005)
- March 22 – Tom McCall, politician and journalist (died 1983)
- March 31 – Etta Baker, Piedmont blues guitarist (died 2006)
- April 4
  - Cecil Gant, blues singer, songwriter and pianist (died 1951)
  - Rosemary Lane, singer (died 1974)
  - Frances Langford, singer, actress (died 2005)
  - Muddy Waters, African-American musician (died 1983)
- April 7
  - Louise Currie, actress (died 2013)
  - Florence S. Jacobsen, Mormon leader (died 2017)
  - Charles Vanik, politician (died 2007)
- April 8
  - Benedict J. Semmes Jr., admiral (died 1994)
  - Carlton Skinner, first civilian governor of Guam (died 2004)
- April 19 – Lloyd Cardwell, American football player and coach (died 1997)
- May 1
  - Roy Matsumoto, army officer (died 2014)
  - Louis Nye, comedian and actor (died 2005)
- May 5 – Fred J. Doocy, politician and banker (died 2017)
- May 8
  - Bob Clampett, animator, director, producer and puppeteer (died 1984)
  - Charles Scorsese, actor (died 1993)
- May 16 – Woody Herman, jazz clarinetist and bandleader (died 1987)
- May 20 – Bill Hewlett, businessman (died 2001)
- May 22 – Benedict Garmisa, politician (died 1985)
- May 24 – Peter Ellenshaw, matte designer (died 2007)
- May 25 – Benjamin Melniker, producer (died 2018)
- June 6 – Carlo L. Golino, scholar (died 1991)
- June 11 – Vince Lombardi, American football coach (died 1970)
- June 13 – Ralph Edwards, game show host (died 2005)
- June 18
  - Sammy Cahn, songwriter (died 1993)
  - Sylvia Porter, economist and journalist (died 1991)
- June 27 – Richard Pike Bissell, author (died 1977)
- July 1
  - Lee Guttero, basketball player (died 2004)
  - Frederick Malkus, politician (died 1999)
  - Frank Barrett, baseball relief pitcher (died 1998)
- July 4 – Barbara Weeks, actress (died 2004)
- July 5
  - Elwood Cooke, tennis player (died 2004)
  - Smiley Lewis, New Orleans rhythm and blues singer, guitarist (died 1966)
- July 6 – Vance Trimble, journalist (died 2021)
- July 7
  - Pinetop Perkins, African American blues pianist (died 2011)
  - Lu Ann Meredith, actress (died 1998)
- July 8 – Bill Thompson, voice actor (died 1971)
- July 12
  - Edith Nash, educator and poet (died 2003)
  - Philip Mayer Kaiser, diplomat (died 2007)
  - Willis Lamb, physicist and Nobel laureate (died 2008)
- July 13 – Kay Linaker, actress (died 2008)
- July 14 – Gerald Ford, 38th president of the United States from 1974 to 1977, 40th vice president of the United States from 1973 to 1974 (died 2006)
- July 15 – Gene Wettstone, gymnastics coach (died 2013)
- July 16 – Herman Gundlach, American football offensive lineman (died 2005)
- July 17 – Bertrand Goldberg, architect (died 1997)
- July 19 – Fred Agnich, geophysicist and politician (died 2004)
- July 24 – Robert Emhardt, actor (died 1994)
- July 30 – Lou Darvas, cartoonist (died 1987)
- August 8
  - Robert Stafford, 71st Governor of Vermont (died 2006)
  - John Facenda, sports broadcaster, chief narrator for NFL Films (died 1984)
  - Cecil Travis, baseball player, shortstop and third baseman for the Washington Senators (died 2006)
- August 9 – Herman Talmadge, U.S. Senator from Georgia from 1957 to 1981 (died 2002)
- August 10 – Noah Beery Jr., actor (died 1994)
- August 16 – Helen F. Holt, politician (died 2015)
- August 17
  - W. Mark Felt, FBI agent also known as "Deep Throat" from Watergate scandal (died 2008)
  - Rudy York, baseball player (died 1970)
- August 20 – Roger Wolcott Sperry, neuropsychologist and neurobiologist, winner of the Nobel Prize in Physiology or Medicine in 1981 (died 1994)
- August 22 – James W. Downing, naval officer and author (died 2018)
- August 26 – Mary Ann DeWeese, sportswear designer (died 1993)
- August 31 – Helen Levitt, photographer (died 2009)
- September 1 – Christian Nyby, director and producer (died 1993)
- September 2 – Alex Lovy, animator (died 1992)
- September 4
  - Mickey Cohen, gangster (died 1976)
  - Boone Guyton, test pilot (died 1996)
  - Stanford Moore, chemist, Nobel Prize laureate (died 1982)
- September 6 – Julie Gibson, singer and actress (died 2019)
- September 10 – Lincoln Gordon, diplomat (died 2009)
- September 11
  - Bear Bryant, American football coach (died 1984)
  - Eugenia Rawls, actress (died 2000)
- September 12 – Jesse Owens, athlete (died 1980)
- September 13 – Roy Engel, actor (died 1980)
- September 22 – Lillian Chestney, painter (died 2000)
- September 24 – Wilson Rawls, writer (died 1984)
- September 30 – Bill Walsh, movie producer and writer (died 1975)
- October 18 – Evelyn Venable, actress (died 1993)
- October 20 – Barney Phillips, actor (died 1982)
- October 22 – Boots Mallory, actress, dancer, and model (died 1958)
- October 28 – Don Lusk, animator (died 2018)
- November 2 – Burt Lancaster, film actor (died 1994)
- November 8 – Max Desfor, news photographer, winner of the Pulitzer Prize for Photography in 1951 (died 2018)
- November 13
  - Landrum Bolling, political scientist and academic administrator (died 2018)
  - Alexander Scourby, actor (died 1985)
- November 14 – George Smathers, U.S. Senator from Florida from 1951 to 1969 (died 2007)
- November 16 – Ellen Albertini Dow, actress (died 2015)
- November 25 – Lewis Thomas, physician and essayist (died 1993)
- December 1 – Mary Martin, actress and singer (died 1990)
- December 2 – Jerry Sohl, scriptwriter (died 2002)
- December 8 – Delmore Schwartz, poet (died 1966)
- December 15 – Muriel Rukeyser, poet (died 1980)
- December 21 – Arnold Friberg, painter and illustrator (died 2010)
- December 25
  - Candy Candido, voice actor (died 1999)
  - Tony Martin, actor and singer (died 2012)
- December 28 – Charles Maxwell, actor (died 1993)

== Deaths ==
- January 16 – Thaddeus S. C. Lowe, aeronaut, scientist and inventor (born 1832)
- January 30 – James Henderson Berry, U.S. Senator from Arkansas from 1885 to 1907 (born 1841)
- February 13 – Charles Major, novelist (born 1856)
- February 17 – Joaquin Miller, "Poet of the Sierras" (born 1837)
- March 10 – Harriet Tubman, African-American abolitionist, humanitarian and Civil War Union spy (born c. 1822)
- March 11 – John Shaw Billings, military and medical leader (born 1838)
- March 31 – J. P. Morgan, financier and banker (born 1837)
- May 1 – John Barclay Armstrong, Texas Ranger and U.S. Marshal (born 1850)
- May 8 – Frank O. Briggs, U.S. Senator from New Jersey from 1907 to 1913 (born 1851)
- June 1 – Thomas W. Palmer, U.S. Senator from Michigan from 1883 to 1889 (born 1830)
- June 5 – Chris von der Ahe, brewer and baseball owner (born 1851 in Prussia)
- June 19 – Thomas M. Norwood, U.S. Senator from Georgia from 1871 to 1877 (born 1830)
- July 3 – Horatio Nelson Young, Civil War Union naval hero (born 1845)
- July 13 – Edward Burd Grubb, Jr., Civil War Union Brevet Brigadier General (born 1841)
- August 3
  - Alpheus Michael Bowman, politician and businessman (born 1847)
  - Josephine Cochrane, inventor of the first commercially successful dishwasher (born 1839)
- August 7 – Samuel Franklin Cody, aviation pioneer, dies in aircraft accident in England (born 1867)
- August 8 – Joseph F. Johnston, U.S. Senator from Alabama from 1907 to 1913 (born 1843)
- August 12 – U. M. Rose, Arkansas lawyer (born 1834)
- September 3 – John Martin, U.S. Senator from Kansas from 1893 to 1895 (born 1833)
- October 16 – Ralph Rose, field athlete (born 1885)
- October 24 – Cornelia Cole Fairbanks, Second Lady of the United States (died 1852)
- November 20 – Helen Appo Cook, African American community activist (born 1837)
- November 28 – George B. Post, architect (born 1837)
- December 7 – Aaron Montgomery Ward, businessman, inventor of mail order (born 1844)
- December 19 – Gustav Oelwein, founder of Oelwein, Iowa (born 1838)
- December 25 – Letitia Stevenson, Second Lady of the United States (born 1843)
- December 26 – Ambrose Bierce, writer and journalist, lost after this date in Mexican Revolution (born 1842)

== See also ==
- List of American films of 1913
- Timeline of United States history (1900–1929)
