= 1966 in the United States =

- Decades: 1940s; 1950s; 1960s; 1970s; 1980s
- See also: History of the United States (1964–1980); Timeline of United States history (1950–1969); List of years in the United States

This is a list of notable events that took place in 1966 in the United States.

== Incumbents ==
=== Federal government ===
- President: Lyndon B. Johnson (D-Texas)
- Vice President: Hubert Humphrey (D-Minnesota)
- Chief Justice: Earl Warren (California)
- Speaker of the House of Representatives: John William McCormack (D-Massachusetts)
- Senate Majority Leader: Mike Mansfield (D-Montana)
- Congress: 89th

==== State governments ====
Governors and lieutenant governors

=== Governors ===
- Governor of Alabama: George Wallace (Democratic)
- Governor of Alaska: William A. Egan (Democratic) (until December 5), Wally Hickel (Republican) (starting December 5)
- Governor of Arizona: Samuel Pearson Goddard Jr. (Democratic)
- Governor of Arkansas: Orval Faubus (Democratic)
- Governor of California: Pat Brown (Democratic)
- Governor of Colorado: John Arthur Love (Republican)
- Governor of Connecticut: John N. Dempsey (Democratic)
- Governor of Delaware: Charles L. Terry Jr. (Democratic)
- Governor of Florida: W. Haydon Burns (Democratic)
- Governor of Georgia: Carl E. Sanders (Democratic)
- Governor of Hawaii: John A. Burns (Democratic)
- Governor of Idaho: Robert E. Smylie (Republican)
- Governor of Illinois: Otto Kerner Jr. (Democratic)
- Governor of Indiana: Roger D. Branigin (Democratic)
- Governor of Iowa: Harold E. Hughes (Democratic)
- Governor of Kansas: William H. Avery (Republican)
- Governor of Kentucky: Edward T. Breathitt (Democratic)
- Governor of Louisiana: John J. McKeithen (Democratic)
- Governor of Maine: John H. Reed (Republican)
- Governor of Maryland: J. Millard Tawes (Democratic)
- Governor of Massachusetts: John A. Volpe (Republican)
- Governor of Michigan: George W. Romney (Republican)
- Governor of Minnesota: Karl F. Rolvaag (Democratic)
- Governor of Mississippi: Paul B. Johnson Jr. (Democratic)
- Governor of Missouri: Warren E. Hearnes (Democratic)
- Governor of Montana: Tim M. Babcock (Republican)
- Governor of Nebraska: Frank B. Morrison (Democratic)
- Governor of Nevada: Grant Sawyer (Democratic)
- Governor of New Hampshire: John W. King (Democratic)
- Governor of New Jersey: Richard J. Hughes (Democratic)
- Governor of New Mexico: Jack M. Campbell (Democratic)
- Governor of New York: Nelson Rockefeller (Republican)
- Governor of North Carolina: Dan K. Moore (Democratic)
- Governor of North Dakota: William L. Guy (Democratic)
- Governor of Ohio: Jim Rhodes (Republican)
- Governor of Oklahoma: Henry Bellmon (Republican)
- Governor of Oregon: Mark Hatfield (Republican)
- Governor of Pennsylvania: William Scranton (Republican)
- Governor of Rhode Island: John Chafee (Republican)
- Governor of South Carolina: Robert Evander McNair (Democratic)
- Governor of South Dakota: Nils Boe (Republican)
- Governor of Tennessee: Frank G. Clement (Democratic)
- Governor of Texas: John Connally (Democratic)
- Governor of Utah: Cal Rampton (Democratic)
- Governor of Vermont: Philip H. Hoff (Democratic)
- Governor of Virginia: Albertis S. Harrison Jr. (Democratic) (until January 15), Mills E. Godwin Jr. (Democratic) (starting January 15)
- Governor of Washington: Daniel J. Evans (Republican)
- Governor of West Virginia: Hulett C. Smith (Democratic)
- Governor of Wisconsin: Warren P. Knowles (Republican)
- Governor of Wyoming: Clifford P. Hansen (Republican)

=== Lieutenant governors ===
- Lieutenant Governor of Alabama: James B. Allen (Democratic)
- Lieutenant Governor of Alaska: Hugh Wade (Democratic) (until December 5), Keith Harvey Miller (Republican) (starting December 5)
- Lieutenant Governor of Arkansas: Nathan Green Gordon (Democratic)
- Lieutenant Governor of California: Glenn Malcolm Anderson (Democratic)
- Lieutenant Governor of Colorado: Robert Lee Knous (Democratic)
- Lieutenant Governor of Connecticut: Samuel J. Tedesco (Democratic) (until month and day unknown), Fred J. Doocy (Democratic) (starting month and day unknown)
- Lieutenant Governor of Delaware: Sherman W. Tribbitt (Democratic)
- Lieutenant Governor of Georgia: Peter Zack Geer (Democratic)
- Lieutenant Governor of Hawaii: William S. Richardson (Democratic) (until December 2), Thomas Gill (Democratic) (starting December 2)
- Lieutenant Governor of Idaho: William Drevlow (Democratic)
- Lieutenant Governor of Illinois: Samuel H. Shapiro (Democratic)
- Lieutenant Governor of Indiana: Robert L. Rock (Democratic)
- Lieutenant Governor of Iowa: Robert D. Fulton (Democratic)
- Lieutenant Governor of Kansas: John Crutcher (Republican)
- Lieutenant Governor of Kentucky: Harry Lee Waterfield (Democratic)
- Lieutenant Governor of Louisiana: C. C. Aycock (Democratic)
- Lieutenant Governor of Massachusetts: Elliot Richardson (Republican)
- Lieutenant Governor of Michigan: William G. Milliken (Republican)
- Lieutenant Governor of Minnesota: Alexander M. Keith (Democratic)
- Lieutenant Governor of Mississippi: Carroll Gartin (Democratic) (until December 19), vacant (starting December 19)
- Lieutenant Governor of Missouri: Thomas Eagleton (Democratic)
- Lieutenant Governor of Montana: Ted James (Republican)
- Lieutenant Governor of Nebraska: Philip Sorensen (Democratic)
- Lieutenant Governor of Nevada: Paul Laxalt (Republican)
- Lieutenant Governor of New Mexico: Mack Easley (Democratic)
- Lieutenant Governor of New York: Malcolm Wilson (Republican)
- Lieutenant Governor of North Carolina: Robert W. Scott (Democratic)
- Lieutenant Governor of North Dakota: Charles Tighe (Democratic)
- Lieutenant Governor of Ohio: John William Brown (Republican)
- Lieutenant Governor of Oklahoma: Leo Winters (Democratic)
- Lieutenant Governor of Pennsylvania: Raymond P. Shafer (Republican)
- Lieutenant Governor of Rhode Island: Giovanni Folcarelli (Democratic)
- Lieutenant Governor of South Carolina: vacant
- Lieutenant Governor of South Dakota: Lem Overpeck (Republican)
- Lieutenant Governor of Tennessee: Jared Maddux (Democratic)
- Lieutenant Governor of Texas: Preston Smith (Democratic)
- Lieutenant Governor of Vermont: John J. Daley (Democratic)
- Lieutenant Governor of Virginia: Mills E. Godwin Jr. (Democratic) (until January 15), Fred G. Pollard (Democratic) (starting January 15)
- Lieutenant Governor of Washington: John Cherberg (Democratic)
- Lieutenant Governor of Wisconsin: Patrick J. Lucey (Democratic)

== Events ==
=== January ===
- January 2 – 1966 New York City transit strike: A wildcat strike by public transportation workers in New York City, led by Mike Quill, begins, designed to coincide with the beginning of Republican John V. Lindsay's mayoralty. (The strike ends on January 13.)
- January 3
  - Sammy Younge Jr. is shot in Tuskegee, Alabama, the first African American university student to be murdered due to his actions in support of the civil rights movement.
  - The first of the Acid Tests is conducted at The Fillmore in San Francisco.
- January 10 – The home of civil rights activist Vernon Dahmer in Hattiesburg, Mississippi, is firebombed. Dahmer's family escapes but he dies the next day from severe burns. (White Knights of the Ku Klux Klan Imperial Wizard Samuel Bowers will be unsuccessfully tried for this murder on four occasions before being convicted in 1998.)
- January 11 – The first SR-71 Blackbird reconnaissance aircraft goes into service at Beale AFB.
- January 12
  - United States President Lyndon Johnson states that the United States should stay in South Vietnam until Communist aggression there is ended.
  - Batman premieres on ABC television.
- January 13 – Robert C. Weaver becomes the first African American Cabinet member by being appointed United States Secretary of Housing and Urban Development.
- January 16 – The Chicago Bulls are granted entry to the National Basketball Association.
- January 17 – 1966 Palomares B-52 crash: A USAF B-52 bomber collides with a KC-135 Stratotanker over Spain, dropping three 70-kiloton hydrogen bombs near the town of Palomares, and one into the sea. Carl Brashear, the first African American United States Navy diver, is involved in an accident during the recovery of the latter which results in the amputation of his leg.
- January 18 – About 8,000 U.S. soldiers land in South Vietnam; U.S. troops now total 190,000.
- January 27 – The British government promises the U.S. that British troops in Malaysia will stay until more peaceful conditions occur in the region.
- January 29 – The first of 608 performances of Sweet Charity opens at the Palace Theatre in New York City.

=== February ===
- February 8 – The National Hockey League awards Pittsburgh a second franchise, the Pittsburgh Penguins.
- February 9 – The National Hockey League awards the Twin Cities area a franchise, the Minnesota North Stars.
- February 28 – U.S. astronauts Charles Bassett and Elliot See are killed in a plane crash in St. Louis, Missouri.

=== March ===
- March 4 – The Beatles: In an interview published in the London Evening Standard, John Lennon comments, "We're more popular than Jesus now," sparking a controversy in the United States.
- March 7 – French president Charles De Gaulle asks U.S. President Lyndon B. Johnson for negotiations about the state of NATO equipment in France.
- March 8 – Vietnam War: U.S. announces it will substantially increase its number of troops in Vietnam.
- March 12 – Bobby Hull of the Chicago Blackhawks sets the National Hockey League single season scoring record against the New York Rangers, with his 51st goal.
- March 16
  - Gemini 8 (David Scott, Neil Armstrong) docks with an Agena target vehicle.
  - The last Studebaker production facility is closed.
- March 17 – Palomares incident: Off the Mediterranean coast of Spain, the United States Navy submersible DSV Alvin finds a missing U.S. hydrogen bomb.
- March 19 – The Texas Western Miners defeat the Kentucky Wildcats with five African American starters, ushering in desegregation in athletic recruiting.
- March 21 – In a landmark obscenity case, Memoirs v. Massachusetts, the Supreme Court rules that the hitherto banned 18th-century English novel Fanny Hill does not meet the Roth Standard for obscenity.
- March 22 – In Washington, D.C., General Motors President James M. Roche appears before a Senate subcommittee, and apologizes to consumer advocate Ralph Nader for the company's intimidation and harassment campaign against him.
- March 24 – Harper v. Virginia State Board of Elections, decided in the Supreme Court, rules that requiring payment of a poll tax as eligibility to vote in state elections is unconstitutional.
- March 26 – Demonstrations are held across the U.S. against the Vietnam War.
- March 28 – The Prime Minister of India, Indira Gandhi, visits Washington, D.C.
- March 29 – The 23rd Communist Party Conference is held in the Soviet Union; Leonid Brezhnev demands that American troops leave Vietnam, and announces that Chinese-Soviet relations are unsatisfactory.

=== April ===
- April 1 – Animated sitcom The Flintstones airs its series finale on the ABC network.
- April 8 – Time magazine cover story asks "Is God Dead?"
- April 13
  - Time's cover story is "London: The Swinging City".
  - President Lyndon Johnson signs the 1966 Uniform Time Act, dealing with daylight saving time.
- April 18 – The 38th Academy Awards ceremony, hosted by Bob Hope, is held at Santa Monica Civic Auditorium. Robert Wise's The Sound of Music jointly wins and receives the most awards and nominations with David Lean's Doctor Zhivago, respectively winning five and receiving ten each. The former's wins include Best Picture and Wise's second Best Director award.
- April 19 – Bobbi Gibb becomes the first woman to run the Boston Marathon.
- April 21 – An artificial heart is installed in the chest of Marcel DeRudder in a Houston, Texas hospital.
- April 29 – U.S. troops in Vietnam total 250,000.
- April 30 – The Church of Satan is formed by Anton Szandor LaVey in San Francisco.
- April – Hidden Valley Downs horse racing track opens in Kansas.
- April – Playboy publish its interview with the leader of the American Nazi Party George Lincoln Rockwell.

=== May ===
- May 5 – The Montreal Canadiens defeat the Detroit Red Wings to win the Stanley Cup in ice hockey.
- May 12
  - Busch Memorial Stadium opens in St. Louis.
  - Radio Peking claims that U.S. planes have shot down a Chinese plane over Yunnan (the U.S. denies the story the next day).
- May 15 – Tens of thousands of anti-war demonstrators again picket the White House, then rally at the Washington Monument.
- May 16
  - In New York City, Dr. Martin Luther King Jr. makes his first public speech on the Vietnam War.
  - The album Pet Sounds by The Beach Boys is released.
- May 19 – Murder of Sylvia Likens: Gertrude Baniszewski is found guilty of torturing and murdering 16-year-old Sylvia Likens in Indiana and is sentenced to life in prison (she is released on parole in December 1985).
- May 25 – In St. Louis, Missouri, U.S. Vice-president Hubert Humphrey and U.S. Secretary of the Interior Stewart Udall dedicate the Gateway Arch.
- May 28
  - Fidel Castro declares martial law in Cuba because of a possible U.S. attack.
  - Boat ride "It's a Small World" opens at Disneyland.

=== June ===
- June 1
  - The final new episode of The Dick Van Dyke Show airs (the first episode was on October 3, 1961).
  - White House Conference on Civil Rights opens.
- June 2 – Surveyor program: Surveyor 1 lands in Oceanus Procellarum on the Moon, becoming the first U.S. spacecraft to soft-land on another planet.
- June 5 – Gemini 9: Gene Cernan completes the second U.S. spacewalk (2 hours, 7 minutes).
- June 6 – Civil rights activist James Meredith is shot while trying to march across Mississippi; he survives.
- June 8
  - An XB-70 Valkyrie prototype is destroyed in a mid-air collision with an F-104 Starfighter chase plane during a photo shoot. NASA pilot Joseph A. Walker and USAF test pilot Carl Cross are both killed.
  - 1966 Topeka tornado: Topeka, Kansas is devastated by a tornado that registers as an F5 on the Fujita Scale, the first to exceed US$100 million in damages. Sixteen people are killed, hundreds more injured, and thousands of homes damaged or destroyed.
- June 13 – Miranda v. Arizona: The Supreme Court of the United States rules that the police must inform suspects of their rights before questioning them.
- June 18 – CIA chief William Raborn resigns; Richard Helms becomes his successor.
- June 20 – Bob Dylan's seminal album Blonde on Blonde is released.
- June 29 – Vietnam War: U.S. planes begin bombing Hanoi and Haiphong.
- June 30 – The National Organization for Women (NOW) is founded in Washington, D.C.

=== July ===
- July – The Chicago Surrealist Group is founded by Franklin and Penelope Rosemont with others.
- July 4
  - President Lyndon B. Johnson signs the Freedom of Information Act, which goes into effect the following year.
  - The Congress of Racial Equality (CORE) endorses the goal of Black Power at a well attended convention in Baltimore, Maryland. Martin Luther King Jr., and Roy Wilkins criticize this declaration.
- July 13 – The International Society for Krishna Consciousness is founded in New York City by A. C. Bhaktivedanta Swami Prabhupada.
- July 14 – Richard Speck murders eight student nurses in their Chicago dormitory. He is arrested on July 17.
- July 18
  - Gemini 10 (John Young, Michael Collins) is launched. After docking with an Agena target vehicle, the astronauts then set a world altitude record of 474 miles (763 km).
  - The Hough Riots break out in Cleveland, Ohio, the city's first race riot.
- July 28 – The U.S. announces that a Lockheed U-2 reconnaissance plane has disappeared over Cuba.
- July 29 – Bob Dylan is injured in a motorcycle accident near his home in Woodstock, New York. He is not seen in public for over a year.

=== August ===
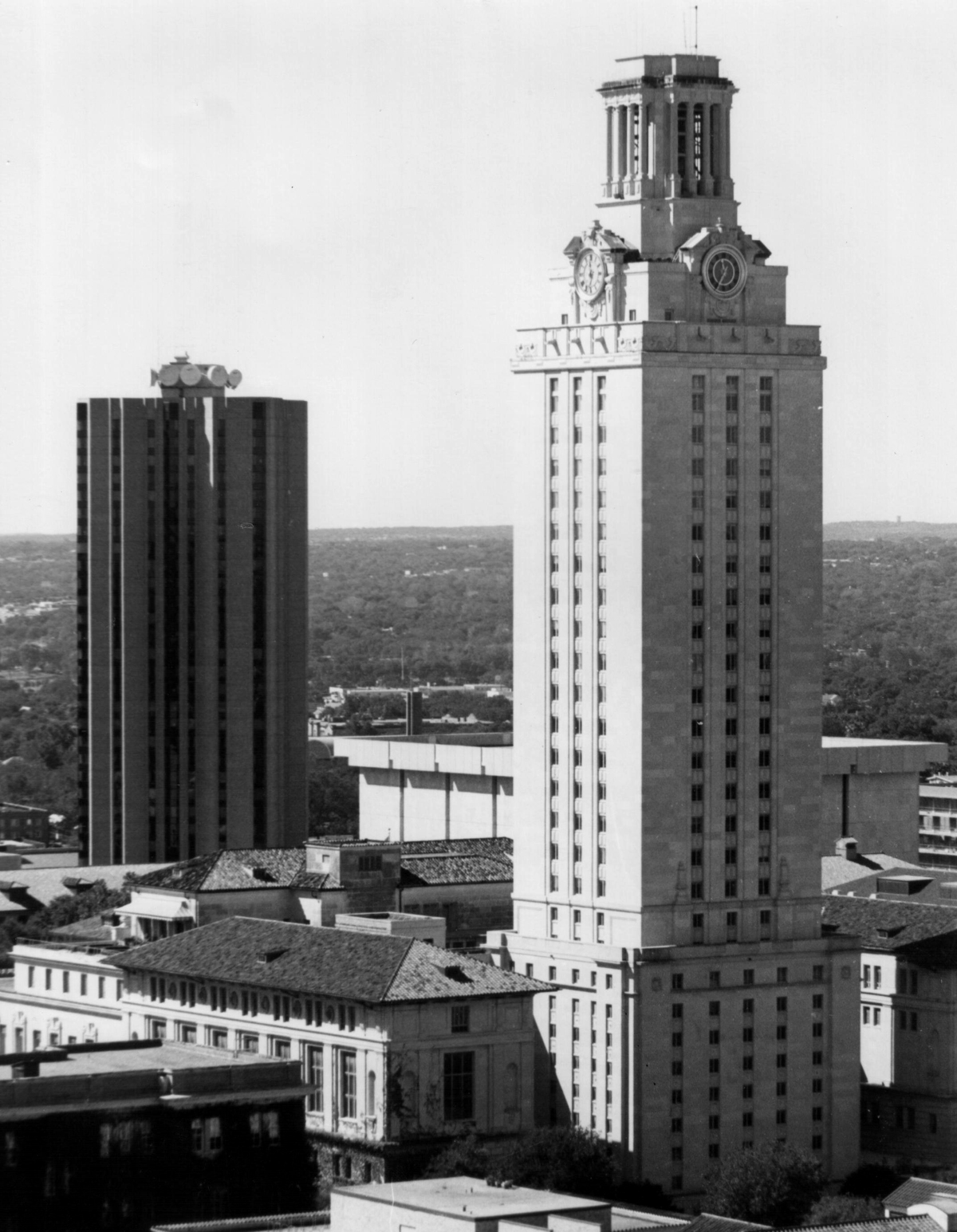
August 1: University of Texas at Austin Main Building tower, where Charles Whitman committed his shooting rampage

- August 1 – Sniper Charles Whitman kills 13 people and wounds 31 from atop the University of Texas at Austin Main Building tower, after earlier killing his wife and mother.
- August 5
  - Groundbreaking takes place for the World Trade Center in New York City.
  - Martin Luther King Jr. leads a civil rights march in Chicago, during which he is struck by a rock thrown from an angry white mob.
  - Caesars Palace hotel and casino opens on the Las Vegas Strip.
- August 6 – Braniff Airlines Flight 250 crashes in Falls City, Nebraska, killing all 42 on board.
- August 7 – Race riots occur in Lansing, Michigan.
- August 10 – Lunar Orbiter 1, the first U.S. spacecraft to orbit another world, is launched.
- August 11 – The Beatles hold a press conference in Chicago, during which John Lennon apologizes for his "more popular than Jesus" remark, saying, "I didn't mean it as a lousy anti-religious thing."
- August 15 – It is announced that the New York Herald Tribune will not resume publication.
- August 16 – Vietnam War: The House Un-American Activities Committee starts investigating Americans who have aided the Viet Cong, with the intent to make these activities illegal. Anti-war demonstrators disrupt the meeting and 50 are arrested.
- August 22
  - The United Farm Workers Organizing Committee (UFWOC), predecessor of the United Farm Workers of America (UFW), is formed.
  - The first Best Buy opens in St. Paul, Minnesota.
- August 24 – Rock band The Doors record their self-titled debut LP.
- August 29 – The Beatles play their very last concert at Candlestick Park in San Francisco, California. Meanwhile, on NBC, Hullabaloo airs its last episode, a rerun with guest star Elvis Presley, which previously aired in April of that year.

=== September ===
- September 1 – While waiting at a bus stop Ralph Baer, an inventor with Sanders Associates, writes a four-page document that lays out the basic principles for creating a video game to be played on a television: the beginning of a multibillion-dollar industry.
- September 7 – The ocean liner SS Hanseatic catches fire and burns in New York Harbor.
- September 8–10 – State visit to the U.S. by the dictator General Ne Win, Chairman of the Revolutionary Council of the Union of Burma. He is honored by a 21-gun salute and given the key to the city of Washington D.C., "a long-standing American tradition of welcome". He holds talks with President Lyndon Johnson and with the highest ranking U.S. officials at the State Department who reaffirm support for Burmese neutrality. Further talks are held with George Ball, acting Secretary of State, and with Averell Harriman, U.S. Ambassador at Large. Talks included an exchange of views on world issues and Burmese-American relations, and were officially described as "cordial", and the U.S. president and the General expressed mutual regard, according to a communiqué composed before the visit. The General also visits Williamsburg in Virginia, the United Nations in New York City (where he is greeted by the Burmese Secretary General U Thant) and Hawaii.
- September 8 – The classic science fiction series Star Trek premieres on NBC with its first episode, titled "The Man Trap".
- September 12 – The Monkees television series premieres on NBC.
- September 16 – The Metropolitan Opera House opens at Lincoln Center in New York City to the world premiere of Samuel Barber's opera, Antony and Cleopatra.
- September 18
  - Valerie Percy, the 21-year-old daughter of Illinois Republican senatorial candidate Charles H. Percy, is stabbed and bludgeoned to death in the family mansion on Chicago's North Shore. The crime remains unsolved.
  - Oakland-Alameda County Coliseum opens to the public in California.
- September 19 – Timothy Leary forms the spiritual group League for Spiritual Discovery (LSD).
- September 29 – Chevrolet Camaro car is introduced.

=== October ===
- October – Bobby Seale and Huey P. Newton found the Black Panther Party.
- October 1 – West Coast Airlines Flight 956 crashes with 18 fatal injuries and no survivors 5.5 miles (8.9 km) south of Wemme, Oregon. This accident marks the first loss of a DC-9.
- October 5 – An experimental breeder reactor at the Enrico Fermi Nuclear Generating Station in Michigan suffers a partial meltdown when its cooling system fails.
- October 6
  - LSD is made illegal in the United States and controlled so strictly that not only are possession and recreational use criminalized, but all legal scientific research programs on the drug in the country are shut down as well.
  - The Love Pageant Rally takes place in the Panhandle of Golden Gate Park (a narrow section that projects into San Francisco's Haight-Ashbury district).
- October 9 – The Baltimore Orioles defeat the Los Angeles Dodgers in Game 4 of the World Series in baseball, 1–0, to sweep the series for their first World Championship; Frank Robinson wins the Triple Crown.
- October 15
  - U.S. President Lyndon B. Johnson signs a bill creating the United States Department of Transportation.
  - The U.S. Congress passes a bill for the creation of Pictured Rocks National Lakeshore.
  - ABC broadcasts a highly acclaimed 90-minute television adaptation of the musical Brigadoon, starring Robert Goulet, Peter Falk, and Sally Ann Howes. It wins many Emmy Awards and inaugurates a short-lived series of special television adaptations of famous Broadway musicals on ABC. Goulet stars in all but one of these specials.
- October 16 – Grace Slick performs live for the first time with Jefferson Airplane.
- October 21 – The AFL-NFL merger in football is approved by the U.S. Congress.
- October 26 – A fire aboard the aircraft carrier USS Oriskany in the Gulf of Tonkin kills 44 crewmen.
- October 27
  - It's the Great Pumpkin, Charlie Brown! premieres on the CBS network.
  - Walt Disney records his final filmed appearance prior to his death, detailing his plans for EPCOT, a utopian planned city to be built in Florida.

=== November ===
- November 1 – The National Football League awards its sixteenth franchise to the city of New Orleans. The team will be named the New Orleans Saints.
- November 2 – The Cuban Adjustment Act comes into force, allowing 123,000 Cubans the opportunity to apply for permanent residence in the United States.
- November 5 – The Indiana Dunes National Park is established as a national lakeshore.
- November 6 – Lunar Orbiter 2 is launched.
- November 8
  - Former Massachusetts Attorney General Edward Brooke becomes the first African American elected to the United States Senate since Reconstruction.
  - Screen actor Ronald Reagan, a Republican, is elected Governor of California.
- November 14 – Jack L. Warner sells Warner Bros. to Seven Arts Productions, which eventually becomes Warner Bros.-Seven Arts.
- November 15
  - Gemini 12 (James A. Lovell, Buzz Aldrin) splashes down safely in the Atlantic Ocean.
  - A Boeing 727 freighter on Pan Am Flight 708 crashes near Berlin, Germany, killing all three crew on board.
  - Two young couples in Point Pleasant, West Virginia reportedly see a strange moth-like creature better known as the Mothman.
- November 16 – Neurosurgeon Sam Sheppard is acquitted in his second trial for the murder of his pregnant wife in 1954.
- November 17 – A spectacular Leonid meteor shower passes over Arizona, at the rate of 2,300 a minute for 20 minutes.
- November 27 – The Washington Redskins defeat the New York Giants 72–41 in the highest scoring game in National Football League history.
- November 28 – Truman Capote's Black and White Ball ('The Party of the Century') is held in New York City.

=== December ===
- December 5 – The Supreme Court rules in Bond v. Floyd that the Georgia House of Representatives must seat Julian Bond, having violated his First and Fourteenth Amendment rights.
- December 15 – Walt Disney dies while producing The Jungle Book, the last animated feature under his personal supervision.
- December 18 – How the Grinch Stole Christmas, narrated by Boris Karloff, is shown for the first time on CBS. It becomes a Christmas tradition.
- December 24 – New York television station WPIX broadcasts The Yule Log for the first time; it becomes a Christmas tradition.
- December 26 – The first Kwanzaa is celebrated by Maulana Karenga, founder of Organization US (a black nationalist group) and later chair of Black Studies, at California State University, Long Beach from 1989 to 2002.

=== Undated ===
- The Congress of the United States creates the National Council for Marine Resources and Engineering Development.
- Paramount Pictures Corporation becomes a wholly owned subsidiary of Gulf+Western Industries, Inc.

=== Ongoing ===
- Civil rights movement (1954–1968)
- Cold War (1947–1991)
- Space Race (1957–1975)
- Vietnam War, U.S. involvement (1964–1973)

== Births ==
- January 4 – Deana Carter, singer
- January 5 – Kate Schellenbach, musician
- January 7 – Carolyn Bessette-Kennedy, actress, model and publicist, wife of John F. Kennedy Jr. (d. 1999)
- January 8 – Andrew Wood, musician (d. 1990)
- January 11 – Marc Acito, playwright, novelist and humorist
- January 13 – Patrick Dempsey, screen actor and race car driver
- January 14 – Dan Schneider, television producer, screenwriter and actor
- January 20 – Rainn Wilson, actor
- January 29 – Julie Ann Taylor, voice actress
- January 30 – Deborah Ochs, archer
- February 1 – Michelle Akers, footballer
- February 10 – Daryl Johnston, American football player
- February 13 – Neal McDonough, American actor
- February 17 – Michael Lepond, bass player
- February 18 – Ryan Routh, former roofer and activist who attempted assassin of Donald Trump
- February 20 – Cindy Crawford, model and actress
- February 22 – Rachel Dratch, actress and comedian
- February 23 – Michael Arata, actor
- February 24 – Billy Zane, actor
- February 25 – Téa Leoni, American actress
- February 26 – Jennifer Grant, actress
- March 1
  - Don Lemon, journalist
  - Zack Snyder, actor, film director, screenwriter and producer
- March 4
  - Daniela Amavia, actress and model
  - Callista Gingrich, businesswoman and diplomat
  - Kevin Johnson, basketball player
  - Dav Pilkey, author and illustrator of children's literature
- March 5
  - Mark Z. Danielewski, author
  - Michael Irvin, American football player
  - Jeff Feagles, American football kicker
- March 10
  - Edie Brickell, singer
  - Mike Timlin, baseball player
- March 11 – Alice Stewart, communications director and pundit (d. 2024)
- March 14
  - Elise Neal, actress
  - Gary Anthony Williams, actor and comedian
- March 16 – Rodney Peete, African American football quarterback
- March 18 – Jerry Cantrell, guitarist, singer and songwriter
- March 21 – Roy Niederhoffer, hedge fund manager and philanthropist
- March 22 – Martha McSally, politician and military pilot
- March 22
  - Martha McSally, politician and military pilot
  - Pia Cayetano, Filipino Politician
- March 25 – Tom Glavine, baseball player
- March 26 – Michael Imperioli, actor
- March 28
  - Cheryl James, African American rapper (Salt-n-Pepa)
  - Captain Janks, prank phone caller (The Howard Stern Show)
- April 1 – Markus Paul, footballer (d. 2020)
- April 2 – Bill Romanowski, American football player
- April 4 – Mike Starr, bassist (Alice in Chains) (d. 2011)
- April 8
  - Cynthia Nixon, actress
  - Robin Wright, actress
- April 14
  - David Justice, African American baseball player
  - Greg Maddux, baseball player
  - Joe Tacopina, lawyer
- April 16 – Jeff Varner, newscaster and reality television personality
- April 18 – Michael Shure, journalist
- April 22
  - Dana Barron, actress
  - Jeffrey Dean Morgan, actor
- April 25 – Tim Easton, songwriter
- April 27 – Brian Koppelman, filmmaker, essayist and podcaster
- April 28
  - John Daly, golfer
  - Jackson Galaxy, cat behaviorist
  - Sig Hansen, sea captain
  - Jim Poole, baseball player (d. 2023)
- April 29
  - Michael Alig, club promoter, musician, writer and convicted killer (d. 2020)
  - Vincent Ventresca, actor
- May 10 – Wade Dominguez, actor, model, singer and dancer (d. 1998)
- May 11 – Bill Ackman, activist investor and hedge fund manager
- May 12 – Stephen Baldwin, actor
- May 14
  - Raphael Saadiq, singer-songwriter
  - Mike Inez, musician (Alice In Chains)
- May 16
  - Janet Jackson, singer
  - Thurman Thomas, American football player
- May 20
  - Dan Abrams, legal commentator
  - Joey Gamache, boxer
- May 21 – Lisa Edelstein, actress and playwright
- May 24 – Ricky Craven, race car driver and sportscaster
- May 25 – Jeff Cross, American football player
- May 28 – Larry Davis, criminal (d. 2008)
- June 2 – Candace Gingrich, LGBT rights activist
- June 10 – Laura Silverman, actress and voice actress
- June 14 –
  - Matt Freeman, musician
  - Eduardo Waghorn, Chilean musician
  - Traylor Howard, actress
  - Kathleen Kane, Pennsylvania Attorney General convicted of felony perjury
- June 16 – Phil Vischer, voice actor, puppeteer, writer, animator, creator of VeggieTales
- June 21 – Rudi Bakhtiar, journalist
- June 27 – Bill Hudson, alpine skier
- June 30 – Mike Tyson, heavyweight boxer
- July 3 – Sandra Lee, television chef and author
- July 5 – Claudia Wells, actress
- July 6
  - Brian Posehn, actor and comedian
  - Glenn Scarpelli, child actor and singer
- July 7 – Jim Gaffigan, comedian and actor
- July 8
  - Michael Hite, American politician
  - Mike Nawrocki, director, animator, writer, lyricist and voice actor
- July 9
  - Jon Schmidt, pianist
  - Pamela Adlon, actress, voice actress, screenwriter, producer and director
- July 10 – Doug TenNapel, animator, cartoonist and comic book artist
- July 11 – Debbe Dunning, actress
- July 13 – Gerald Levert, singer-songwriter (d. 2006)
- July 14 – Matthew Fox, actor
- July 18
  - Lori Alan, actress
  - Dan O'Brien, athlete
- July 19 – Nancy Carell, actress
- July 21 – Doug Chin, attorney and politician
- July 22 – Tim Brown, American football player
- July 29 – Richard Steven Horvitz, voice actor
- July 30 – Sean Patrick Maloney, politician; U.S. Representative of New York since 2013
- August 2 – Tim Wakefield, baseball player (d. 2023)
- August 5
  - Jennifer Finch, punk musician (d. 2026)
  - James Gunn, filmmaker
  - Jonathan Silverman, actor
- August 8 – Jimmy Wales, co-founder of Wikipedia
- August 10
  - André Sogliuzzo, actor
  - Gerald Williams, baseball player (d. 2022)
  - Ryan Idol, pornographic film actor
- August 14 – Halle Berry, film actress
- August 15 – Scott Brosius, baseball player
- August 17
  - Claire Celsi, politician (d. 2025)
  - Matt Maiellaro, voice actor and director
  - Mister Cee, disc jockey (d. 2024)
  - Rodney Mullen, skateboarder
- August 23 – Cleto Escobedo III, musician and bandleader (d. 2025)
- August 25 – Michael Cohen, attorney
- August 30 – Scott Kannberg, musician (Pavement, Preston School of Industry)
- September 1 – Ken Levine, video game designer
- September 2
  - Salma Hayek, film actress
  - Tuc Watkins, actor
- September 9
  - Lance Blanks, basketball player (d. 2023)
  - Adam Sandler, actor, comedian, screenwriter, musician and film producer
- September 16 – Sean Frye, child actor
- September 19 – Soledad O'Brien, television journalist and news anchor
- September 20 – Cheryl Reeve, basketball coach
- September 22 – Mike Richter, ice hockey player
- September 24 – Michael O. Varhola, author and publisher
- September 27
  - Don Jamieson, American comedian and television host
  - Debbie Wasserman Schultz, American politician
  - Stephanie Wilson, American engineer and astronaut
- October 1 – Scott Innes, voice actor and singer
- October 2 – Yokozuna, pro wrestler (d. 2000)
- October 3 – Binyamin Ze'ev Kahane, American-born Israeli rabbi, settler leader and murder victim, died in Ofra, West Bank (d. 2000 in Israel)
- October 5 – Terri Runnels, wrestling manager and TV host
- October 6 – Jacqueline Obradors, actress
- October 7 – Sherman Alexie, Native American author
- October 10 – Carolyn Bertozzi, chemist, Nobel Prize laureate
- October 15 – Bill Charlap, pianist and composer
- October 16 – Mary Elizabeth McGlynn, voice actress and director
- October 18
  - Dave Price, journalist and weather forecaster
  - Sam Sorbo, actress and author
- October 27 – Matt Drudge, journalist
- October 28
  - Steve Atwater, American football player
  - Andy Richter, actor, writer, comedian and late night talk show announcer
- November 2
  - David Schwimmer, screen actor
  - Sean Kanan, actor
- November 9 – Lori Lively, actress
- November 14 – Curt Schilling, baseball player
- November 19
  - Shmuley Boteach – Orthodox rabbi, radio and television host, and author
  - Gail Devers, track and field athlete
  - Jason Scott Lee, actor and martial artist
- November 21 – Troy Aikman, sports commentator, previously pro football player
- November 22 – Michael K. Williams, actor (d. 2021)
- November 25 – Mark Brnovich, lawyer and politician (d. 2026)
- November 27 – Andy Merrill, voice actor
- November 28 – Sam Seder, political commentator
- November 30 – Wil Mara, author
- December 1 – Katherine LaNasa, actress
- December 4
  - Fred Armisen, actor, comedian and musician
  - Carey Means, actor and voice artist
- December 8
  - Michael Cole, WWE commentator
  - Matthew Labyorteaux, actor
- December 9
  - Kirsten Gillibrand, U.S. Senator from New York from 2009
  - Michael Foster, drummer
  - Glenn Youngkin, 74th governor of Virginia
- December 10 – Mateo Romero, Native American painter
- December 12 – Greg Long, Christian musician
- December 13 – Don Roff, writer and filmmaker
- December 14 – Anthony Mason, basketball player (d. 2015)
- December 21 – Adam Schefter, journalist and sportscaster
- December 27 – Fabian Núñez, politician
- Undated – Victor Vescovo, explorer and investor

== Deaths ==
- January 3
  - Marguerite Higgins, journalist (b. 1920)
  - Rex Lease, film actor (b. 1903)
  - Sammy Younge Jr., civil rights activist and murder victim (b. 1944)
- January 14 – Bill Carr, Olympic sprinter (b. 1909)
- January 16 – Courtney Hodges, army general (b. 1887)
- January 17 – Vincent J. Donehue, stage director (b. 1915)
- January 18 – Kathleen Norris, fiction writer (b. 1880)
- January 31 – Elizabeth Patterson, actress (b. 1875)
- February 1
  - Hedda Hopper, actress and columnist (b. 1885)
  - Buster Keaton, silent film comic actor and director (b. 1895)
- February 3 – June Walker, actress (b. 1900)
- February 9 – Sophie Tucker, singer (b. 1886 in Ukraine)
- February 10 – Billy Rose, composer and bandleader (b. 1899)
- February 12 – Frank Merrill, silent film actor and gymnast (b. 1893)
- February 17 – Alfred P. Sloan, businessman (b. 1875)
- February 18 – Robert Rossen, film director (b. 1908)
- February 20 – Chester W. Nimitz, admiral (b. 1885)
- February 28 – Jonathan Hale, Canadian-born actor (b. 1891)
- March 1
  - William R. Munroe, admiral (b. 1886)
  - Donald Stewart, actor (b. 1910)
- March 3
  - William Frawley, actor (I Love Lucy) (b. 1887)
  - Maxfield Parrish, painter and illustrator (b. 1870)
  - Alice Pearce, screen actress (b. 1917)
- March 4 – Joseph Fields, playwright (b. 1895)
- March 7
  - Donald B. Beary, admiral (b. 1888)
  - Chief Yowlachie, Native American actor (b. 1891)
- March 20 – Johnny Morrison, baseball player (b. 1895)
- March 27 – Helen Menken, stage actress (b. 1901)
- April 6 – Julia Faye, film actress (b. 1893)
- April 11 – William H. Pitsenbarger, U.S. Air Force Medal of Honour recipient (b. 1944)
- April 29 – Eugene O'Brien, stage and silent film actor (b. 1880)
- May 26 – Don Castle, film actor (b. 1917)
- June 1 – Papa Jack Laine, jazz drummer and bandleader (b. 1873)
- June 6 – Ethel Clayton, silent film actress (b. 1882)
- June 11 – Wallace Ford, actor (b. 1898 in the United Kingdom)
- June 19 – Ed Wynn, actor and comedian (b. 1886)
- June 20 – Paul Kuhn, German-born operatic tenor (b. 1874 in Germany)
- July 3 – Deems Taylor, composer (b. 1885)
- July 6
  - Sad Sam Jones, baseball player (b. 1892)
  - Anne Nagel, actress (b. 1915)
- July 7 – Carmelita Geraghty, silent film actress and painter (b. 1901)
- July 11 – Delmore Schwartz, poet (b. 1913)
- July 18 – Bobby Fuller, rock and roll musician (b. 1942)
- July 23
  - Montgomery Clift, film actor (b. 1920)
  - Douglass Montgomery, film actor (b. 1907)
- July 25 – Frank O'Hara, poet (b. 1926)
- August 1 – Charles Whitman, mass murderer (b. 1941)
- August 3 – Lenny Bruce, comedian (b. 1925)
- August 6 – Cordwainer Smith, science fiction author (b. 1913)
- August 15 – Seena Owen, silent film actress and screenwriter (b. 1894)
- August 17 – Bill Allington, baseball player and manager (b. 1903)
- August 23 – Francis X. Bushman, film actor (b. 1883)
- August 26 – Art Baker, radio and screen actor (b. 1898)
- September 6 – Margaret Sanger, birth control advocate (b. 1879)
- September 8 – Walter Friedländer, art historian (b. 1873 in Germany)
- September 9 – Nestor Paiva, actor (b. 1905)
- September 14 – Gertrude Berg, radio and screen actress and writer (b. 1899)
- September 26 – Helen Kane, "boop-a-doop" singer (b. 1904)
- September 28 – Eric Fleming, television Western actor, died in Peru (b. 1925)
- October 1 – Mary Logan Reddick, African American neuroembryologist (born 1914)
- October 13 – Clifton Webb, actor, dancer and singer (b. 1889)
- October 16 – George O'Hara, silent film actor and screenwriter (b. 1899)
- October 18
  - Elizabeth Arden, cosmetics entrepreneur (b. 1878 in Canada)
  - S. S. Kresge, retailer (b. 1867)
- October 23 – Claire McDowell, silent film actress (b. 1877)
- November 1 – Dick Roberts, banjo and guitar player (b. 1897)
- November 2 – Mississippi John Hurt, African American singer and guitarist (b. 1893)
- November 10 – Evelyn Sears, tennis player (b. 1875)
- November 12 – Quincy Porter, composer (b. 1897)
- November 28 – Boris Podolsky, physicist (b. 1896 in Russia)
- December 6 – Peter H. Odegard, political scientist and academic administrator (b. 1901)
- December 11 – Augusta Fox Bronner, psychologist, specialist in juvenile psychology (b. 1881)
- December 14
  - Emma Dunn, English actress (b. 1875)
  - Verna Felton, voice actress (b. 1890)
  - Richard Whorf, actor (b. 1906)
- December 15 – Walt Disney, business magnate, animator, producer, director, screenwriter and voice actor (b. 1901)
- December 22
  - Harry Beaumont, film director (b. 1888)
  - Lucy Burns, women's rights campaigner (b. 1879)
  - Robert Keith, actor (b. 1898)
- December 23 – David J. Stewart, actor (b. 1915)
- December 30 – Christian Herter, Secretary of State (b. 1895)

== See also ==
- List of American films of 1966
- Timeline of United States history (1950–1969)
