= 1954 Connecticut Attorney General election =

- November 2, 1954
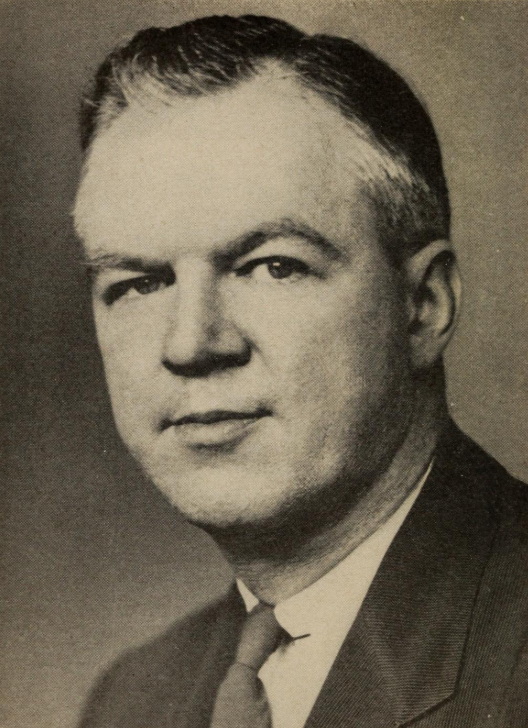

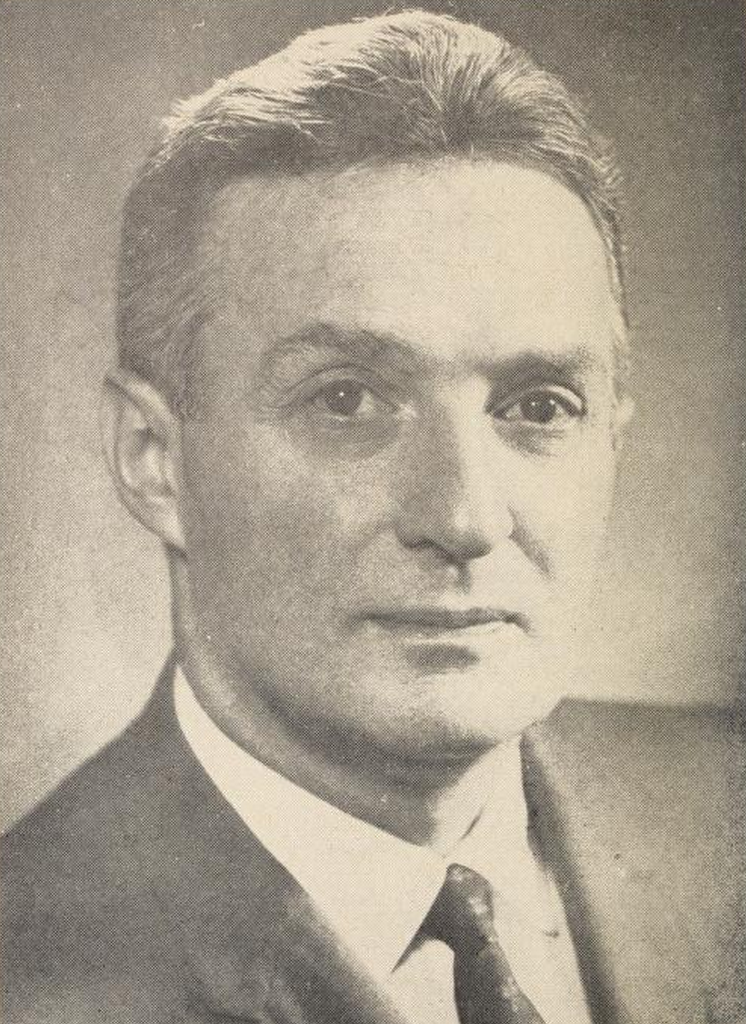
Nominee	John J. Bracken	Samuel J. Tedesco
Party	Republican	Democratic
Popular vote	471,770	458,189
Percentage	50.7%	49.3%
- Bracken: 50–60% 60–70% 70–80% 80–90% Tedesco: 50–60% 60–70%
Attorney General before election
William L. Beers
Republican
Elected Attorney General
John J. Bracken
Republican

The 1954 Connecticut Attorney General election took place on November 2, 1954, to elect the Attorney General of Connecticut. Incumbent Republican Attorney General William L. Beers did not seek re-election. Republican nominee John J. Bracken defeated Democratic state senator Samuel J. Tedesco. As of 2026, this was the last time a Republican was elected Attorney General of Connecticut.

== Republican primary ==
=== Candidates ===
==== Nominee ====
- John J. Bracken, former candidate for state senator from the 3rd district in 1936 and 1946, and candidate for the Branford District judge of probate in 1934

== Democratic primary ==
=== Candidates ===
==== Nominee ====
- Samuel J. Tedesco, state senator from the 23rd district (1951–1955) and former state representative from Bridgeport (1941–1943)

== General election ==
=== Results ===
1954 Connecticut Attorney General election
Party	Candidate	Votes	%	±%
Republican	John J. Bracken	471,770	50.73%	
Democratic	Samuel J. Tedesco	458,189	49.27%	
Total votes		929,959	100.0%	
Republican hold				

== See also ==
- Connecticut Attorney General
