= 1962 Connecticut lieutenant gubernatorial election =

- November 6, 1962
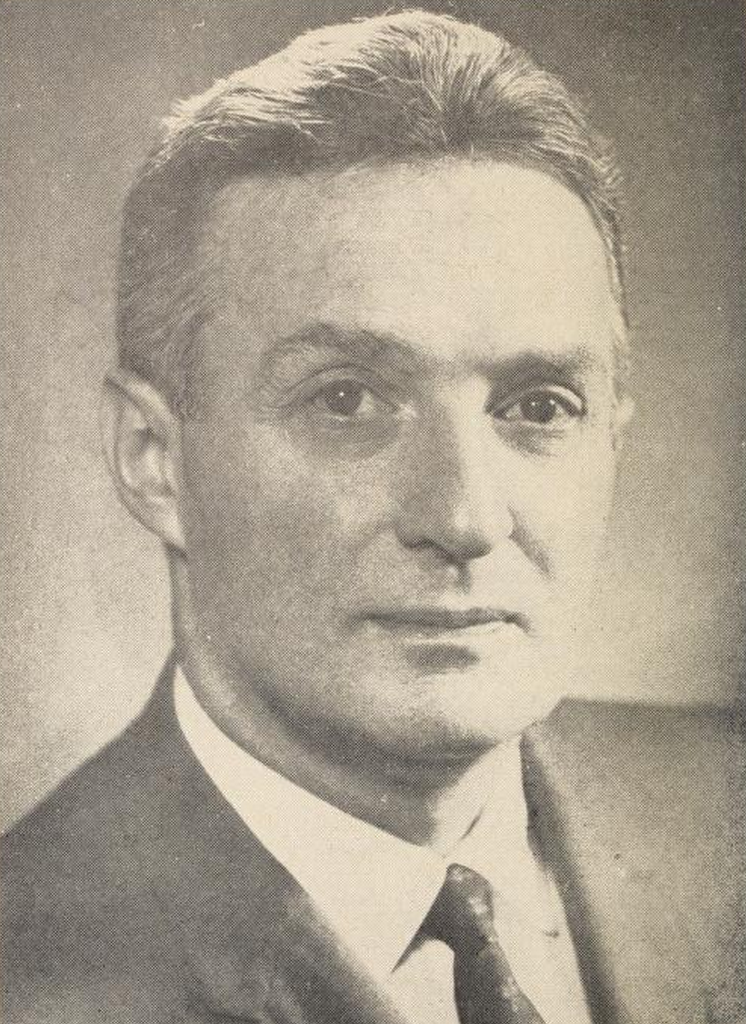

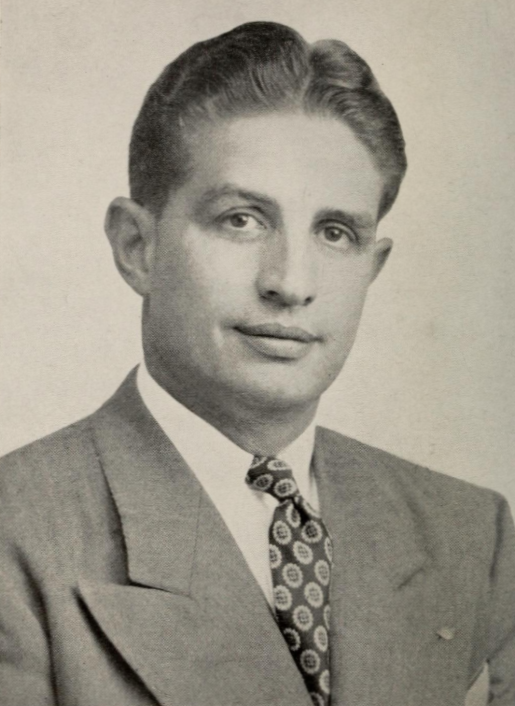
Nominee	Samuel J. Tedesco	Joseph A. Adorno
Party	Democratic	Republican
Popular vote	550,428	480,462
Percentage	53.39%	46.61%
- Tedesco: 50–60% 60–70% 70–80% Adorno: 50–60% 60–70% 70–80% 80–90%
Lieutenant Governor before election
Anthony J. Armentano
Democratic
Elected Lieutenant Governor
Samuel J. Tedesco
Democratic

The 1962 Connecticut lieutenant gubernatorial election was held on November 6, 1962. Mayor of Bridgeport Democrat Samuel J. Tedesco defeated former Connecticut State Treasurer Republican nominee Joseph A. Adorno with 53.4% of the vote.

On, January 21, 1961, Governor Abraham Ribicoff resigned to become a member of President John F. Kennedy's cabinet. His lieutenant, John N. Dempsey, succeeded him as governor.

According to Connecticut law, the President pro tempore of the Senate, at the time of which was Anthony J. Armentano, would automatically assume the office of lieutenant governor once vacant. Armentano chose not to seek election to a full term.

This would be the last election in which the lieutenant governor and governor ran separately, as on the same day, Connecticut voters overwhelmingly approved of a constitutional amendment forcing the governor and lieutenant governor to run on the same ticket.

== General election ==
=== Candidates ===
- Democratic: Samuel J. Tedesco, Mayor of Bridgeport.
- Republican: Joseph A. Adorno, former Connecticut State Treasurer (1947–1955).

=== Results ===
1962 Connecticut lieutenant gubernatorial election
Party	Candidate	Votes	%
Democratic	Samuel J. Tedesco	550,428	53.39%
Republican	Joseph A. Adorno	480,462	46.61%
Total votes		1,030,890	100.00%
Democratic hold			
