= 1966 Connecticut Attorney General election =

- November 8, 1966

Nominee	Harold M. Mulvey	William D. Graham
Party	Democratic	Republican
Popular vote	545,209	443,980
Percentage	55.1%	44.9%
- Mulvey: 50–60% 60–70% 70–80% Graham: 50–60% 60–70% 70–80%
Attorney General before election
Harold M. Mulvey
Democratic
Elected Attorney General
Harold M. Mulvey
Democratic

The 1966 Connecticut Attorney General election took place on November 8, 1966, to elect the Attorney General of Connecticut. Incumbent Democratic Attorney General Harold M. Mulvey was appointed to the office by Governor John N. Dempsey in 1963 to fill the vacancy left by Albert L. Coles, who resigned to become judge of the Connecticut Superior Court. Mulvey was elected to a full term in his own right, defeating Republican nominee William D. Graham.

== Democratic primary ==
=== Candidates ===
==== Nominee ====
- Harold M. Mulvey, incumbent attorney general (1963–1968)

== Republican primary ==
=== Candidates ===
==== Nominee ====
- William D. Graham, nominee for state treasurer in 1962

== General election ==
=== Results ===
1966 Connecticut Attorney General election
Party	Candidate	Votes	%	±%
Democratic	Harold M. Mulvey (incumbent)	545,209	55.12%	
Republican	William D. Graham	443,980	44.88%	
Write-in	Write-ins	27	0.00%	N/A
Total votes		1,058,069	100.0%	
Democratic hold				

== See also ==
- Connecticut Attorney General
