= 1958 Connecticut Attorney General election =

- November 4, 1958
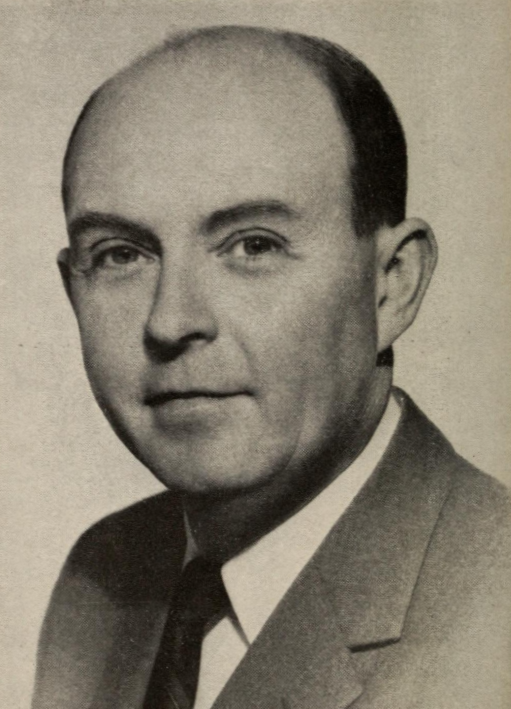

Nominee	Albert L. Coles	Simon S. Cohen
Party	Democratic	Republican
Popular vote	560,576	407,845
Percentage	57.9%	42.1%
- Coles: 50–60% 60–70% 70–80% Cohen: 50–60% 60–70% 70–80%
Attorney General before election
John J. Bracken
Republican
Elected Attorney General
Albert L. Coles
Democratic

The 1958 Connecticut Attorney General election took place on November 4, 1958, to elect the Attorney General of Connecticut. Incumbent Republican Attorney General John J. Bracken did not seek re-election. Democratic nominee Albert L. Coles defeated Republican nominee Simon S. Cohen. As of 2026, this was the last time the Attorney General's office of Connecticut changed partisan control.

== Republican primary ==
=== Candidates ===
==== Nominee ====
- Simon S. Cohen, former state representative from Ellington (1947–1955)

== Democratic primary ==
=== Candidates ===
==== Nominee ====
- Albert L. Coles, former state senator from the 22nd district (1939–1949)

== General election ==
=== Results ===
1958 Connecticut Attorney General election
Party	Candidate	Votes	%	±%
Democratic	Albert L. Coles	560,576	57.89%	
Republican	Leonard Levy	407,845	42.11%	
Total votes		968,421	100.0%	
Democratic gain from Republican				

== See also ==
- Connecticut Attorney General
