= 1962 Connecticut Attorney General election =

- November 6, 1962
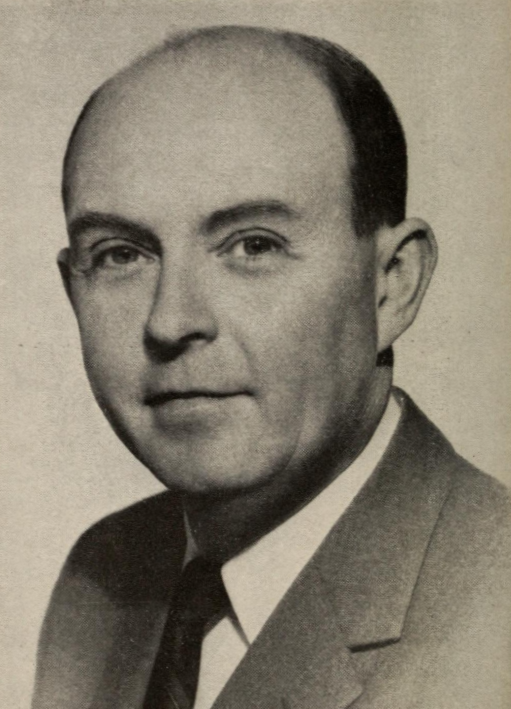

Nominee	Albert L. Coles	Leonard Levy
Party	Democratic	Republican
Popular vote	555,796	475,609
Percentage	53.9%	46.1%
- Coles: 50–60% 60–70% 70–80% Levy: 50–60% 60–70% 70–80% 80–90%
Attorney General before election
Albert L. Coles
Democratic
Elected Attorney General
Albert L. Coles
Democratic

The 1962 Connecticut Attorney General election took place on November 6, 1962, to elect the Attorney General of Connecticut. Incumbent Democratic Attorney General Albert L. Coles won re-election to a second term, defeating Republican nominee Leonard Levy.

== Democratic primary ==
=== Candidates ===
==== Nominee ====
- Albert L. Coles, incumbent attorney general (1959–1963)

== Republican primary ==
=== Candidates ===
==== Nominee ====
- Leonard Levy, attorney

== General election ==
=== Results ===
1962 Connecticut Attorney General election
Party	Candidate	Votes	%	±%
Democratic	Albert L. Coles (incumbent)	555,796	53.89%	
Republican	Leonard Levy	475,609	46.11%	
Write-in	Write-ins	5	0.00%	N/A
Total votes		1,031,410	100.0%	
Democratic hold				

== See also ==
- Connecticut Attorney General
