= Attilio R. Frassinelli =

American politician (1907–1976)

98th Lieutenant Governor of Connecticut
- In office 1967–1971
- Governor: John N. Dempsey
- Preceded by: Fred J. Doocy
- Succeeded by: T. Clark Hull

Member of the Connecticut House of Representatives from Stafford
- In office 1947–1953
- Preceded by: Melvin C. Cummings; John H. Mullen
- Succeeded by: David J. Dickson Jr. Benito Muzio

Personal details
- Born: August 7, 1907 Stafford Springs, Connecticut, U.S.
- Died: February 9, 1976 (aged 68)
- Party: Democratic

Attilio R. "Pop" Frassinelli (August 7, 1907 – February 9, 1976) was an American politician who was the 98th lieutenant governor of Connecticut from 1967 to 1971.

== Early life ==
Frassinelli was born August 7, 1907, in Stafford Springs, Connecticut.

== Political and business career ==
Frassinelli graduated from the Metropolitan School of Accounting in Boston, Massachusetts, and was in the insurance business. Frassinelli served in the Connecticut House of Representatives from 1947 to 1953. He was a delegate to the Democratic National Convention from Connecticut in 1952 and alternate delegate in 1956 and 1960. Frassinelli served as selectman and on the board of education in 1932. From 1967 to 1971, he was the last of four consecutive Lieutenant Governors of Connecticut of governor John N. Dempsey, who had been a governor since 1961.

== Death ==
Frassinelli died on February 9, 1976, at his vacation home in Montego Bay, Jamaica, following a stroke.

== See also ==
- List of governors of Connecticut

Party political offices
Preceded by Samuel J. Tedesco	Democratic nominee for Lieutenant Governor of Connecticut; 1966	Succeeded by Hugh C. Curran
Political offices
Preceded by Fred J. Doocy	Lieutenant Governor of Connecticut; 1967-1971	Succeeded by T. Clark Hull
