= Harold M. Mulvey =

American judge

18th Attorney General of Connecticut
- In office January 1963 – January 1968
- Governor: John N. Dempsey
- Preceded by: Albert L. Coles
- Succeeded by: Robert K. Killian

Personal details
- Born: December 5, 1914 New Haven, Connecticut
- Died: February 27, 2000 (aged 85) Hamden, Connecticut
- Party: Democratic
- Education: Fordham University

Harold M. Mulvey (December 5, 1914 – February 27, 2000) was the 18th Attorney General of Connecticut, serving from 1963 to 1968.

== Early life and career ==
Mulvey was born on December 5, 1914, in New Haven, Connecticut, and had four siblings. He attended local public schools in New Haven, and then went off to college, receiving a Bachelor of Arts from Fordham University in 1938, and receiving his law degree from there in 1941.

After serving in World War II in the Coast Guard for four years, he commenced private law practice for a brief period in New York, opened a law office in New Haven and then became the Corporation Counsel of New Haven under Mayor Richard C. Lee, serving from 1961 to 1963. He had previously been a member of the Connecticut Marketing Authority from 1955 until 1961.

== Political and judicial career ==
In 1963, Mulvey, a Democrat, was appointed by Connecticut Governor John Dempsey to be the state Attorney General, filling the unexpired term of Albert L. Coles. He served for four years until 1967, when he won election to the office outright. He resigned a year later to accept an appointment to the Connecticut Superior Court.

During his time as a Superior Court judge, he presided over the emotionally-charged murder trials of several Black Panthers in the 1970s.

== Personal life and death ==
Mulvey, a devout Catholic, was married to Genevieve Carroll Mulvey. They had one daughter, and two grand children.

Mulvey died on February 27, 2000, in Hamden, Connecticut at the age of 85.

Party political offices
Preceded by Albert L. Coles	Democratic nominee for Connecticut Attorney General; 1966	Succeeded by Robert K. Killian
