= Senator Cashman =

Senator Cashman may refer to:

- John E. Cashman (1865–1946), Wisconsin State Senate
- Peter L. Cashman (born 1936), Connecticut State Senate
