= Anthony J. Armentano =

American politician (1916–1987)

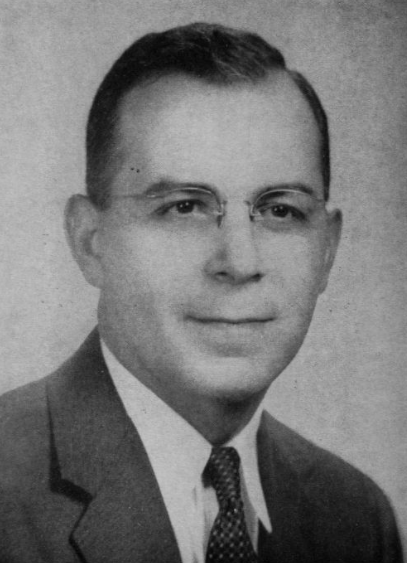

Associate Justice of the Connecticut Supreme Court
- In office March 2, 1981 – June 21, 1986
- Appointed by: William A. O'Neill

Judge of the Connecticut Superior Court
- In office 1965–1981
- Appointed by: John N. Dempsey

95th Lieutenant Governor of Connecticut
- In office January 21, 1961 – January 9, 1963
- Governor: John N. Dempsey
- Preceded by: John N. Dempsey
- Succeeded by: Samuel J. Tedesco

President Pro Tempore of the Connecticut State Senate
- In office 1959–1961
- Preceded by: Theodore S. Ryan
- Succeeded by: Fred J. Doocy

Member of the Connecticut State Senate from the 3rd district
- In office 1957–1961
- Preceded by: Joseph A. Bonaquisto
- Succeeded by: Daniel A. Camilliere

Personal details
- Born: June 21, 1916 Hartford, Connecticut, U.S.
- Died: December 25, 1987 (aged 71)
- Party: Democratic
- Parent(s): Joseph Armentano; Rosina Donatro
- Education: Boston University (BA); Boston University School of Law
- Profession: Politician, judge

Anthony J. Armentano (June 21, 1916 – December 25, 1987) was an American politician who was the 95th lieutenant governor of Connecticut from 1961 to 1963.

== Early life ==
Anthony J. Armentano was born in Hartford, son of Joseph and Rosina (Donato) Armentano. He went to Hartford Public High School, then studied at Boston University, where he got a B.A. in business administration in 1939. Then he studied at the Boston University School of Law and received his law degree in 1941. He was admitted to the Connecticut Bar the same year. He served in the U.S. Army during the Second World War, reaching the rank of Captain before he was discharged. He started to practice law in 1946. In 1953, he became a judge of the Court of Common Pleas.

== Political career ==
Armentano was elected to the Connecticut State Senate in 1957. He was president pro tempore from 1959. As such, he became the new Lieutenant Governor of Connecticut when the lieutenant governor John N. Dempsey succeeded governor Abraham A. Ribicoff as governor. However, he resigned as lieutenant governor in 1963.

== Justice ==
Armentano was appointed judge of the Superior Court in 1965. He became a justice of the Supreme Court of Connecticut on March 2, 1981. In January 1983, he became a senior associate justice.

He died December 25, 1987.

== See also ==
- List of governors of Connecticut

Political offices
Preceded by John N. Dempsey	Lieutenant Governor of Connecticut; 1961-1963	Succeeded by Samuel J. Tedesco
