= Jane Tedesco =

American politician (1906–1997)

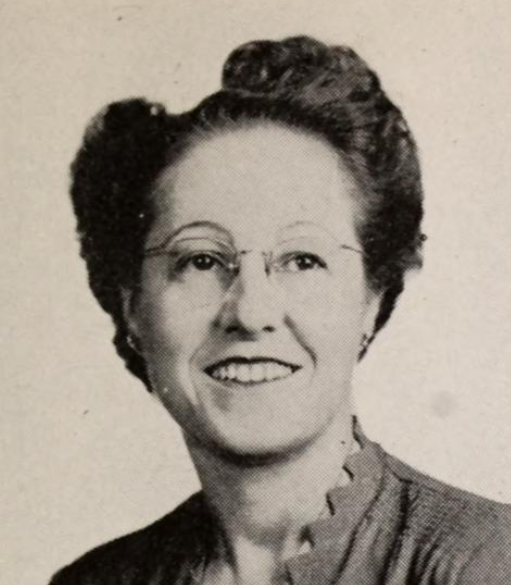
- Tedesco c. 1946

Member of the Connecticut House of Representatives from Bridgeport
- In office 1945–1947 Serving with Milton J. Herman
- Preceded by: Milton J. Herman; Charles F. Dowd
- Succeeded by: Milton J. Herman; Joseph C. Bobert

Personal details
- Born: March 8, 1906 Bridgeport, Connecticut, U.S.
- Died: May 26, 1997 (aged 91) Bridgeport, Connecticut, U.S.
- Party: Democratic
- Spouse: Joseph S. Tedesco
- Children: 4

Jane J. Tedesco (née Gelormino; March 8, 1906 – May 26, 1997) was an American politician who served in the Connecticut House of Representatives from 1945 to 1947, representing the city of Bridgeport as a Democrat.

== Personal life ==
Tedesco was born in Bridgeport, Connecticut, on March 8, 1906, to Louis and Sarena Gelormino. She was married to Joseph S. Tedesco. Joseph's first wife was Jane's sister, Elizabeth, with whom he had two children, Samuel J. Tedesco and Sally. Joseph and Jane later had two children together.

== Political career ==
A Democrat, Tedesco was elected to the Connecticut House of Representatives in 1944, and she served one term representing the city of Bridgeport alongside fellow Democrat Milton J. Herman. She was a member of the Contingent Expenses Committee. Tedesco was not a candidate for reelection in 1946 and left office in 1947.

== Death ==
Tedesco died on May 26, 1997, at St. Vincent's Medical Center in Bridgeport, Connecticut. She was 91.
