= 1966 Connecticut gubernatorial election =

- November 8, 1966
- Turnout: 77.3%
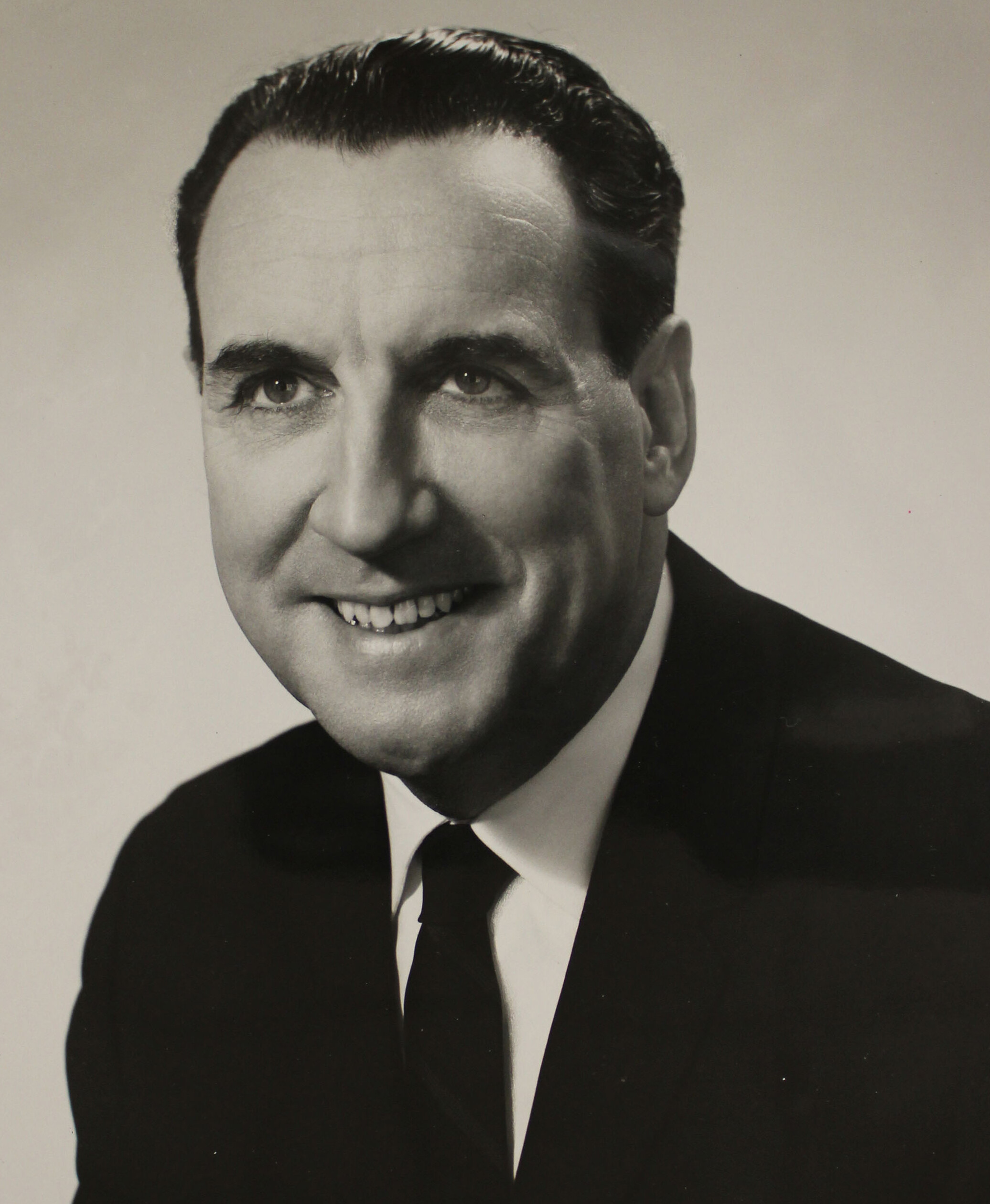

Nominee	John N. Dempsey	E. Clayton Gengras
Party	Democratic	Republican
Running mate	Attilio R. Frassinelli	John L. Gerardo
Popular vote	561,599	446,536
Percentage	55.68%	44.28%
- Dempsey: 50–60% 60–70% 70–80% Gengras: 50–60% 60–70% 70–80%
Governor before election
John N. Dempsey
Democratic
Elected Governor
John N. Dempsey
Democratic

The 1966 Connecticut gubernatorial election was held on November 8, 1966. Incumbent Democrat John N. Dempsey defeated Republican nominee E. Clayton Gengras with 55.68% of the vote.

In 1962, Connecticut voters overwhelmingly approved of 5 Constitutional Amendments placed on the ballot. Among these was a proposition to end the Governor and Lieutenant Governor from running separately in an election, which won, 81% to 19%.

As a result, this was the first gubernatorial election to have both the Governor and Lieutenant Governor run on the same ticket in a general election.

== General election ==
=== Candidates ===
- John N. Dempsey, Democratic
- E. Clayton Gengras, Republican

=== Results ===
1966 Connecticut gubernatorial election
Party	Candidate	Votes	%
Democratic	John N. Dempsey (incumbent)	561,599	55.68%
Republican	E. Clayton Gengras	446,536	44.28%
Total votes		1,008,557	100.00%
Democratic hold			
