= Sadie Griffin =

American politician (1877–1958)

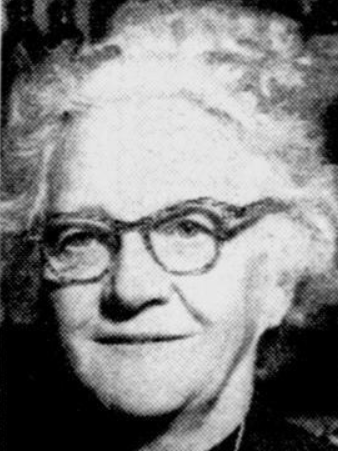
- Griffin in 1950

Member of the Connecticut House of Representatives from Bridgeport
- In office January 4, 1939 – January 8, 1941 Serving with William S. Neil
- Preceded by: John P. Chiota Jr. Benjamin Leipner
- Succeeded by: Samuel J. Tedesco; Milton J. Herman

Member of the Bridgeport City Council
- In office November 10, 1935 – November 10, 1949

Personal details
- Born: Sarah Katherine Dempsey; February 18, 1877 North Baltimore, Ohio, U.S.
- Died: February 2, 1958 (aged 80) Bridgeport, Connecticut, U.S.

Sarah Katherine "Sadie" Griffin (née Dempsey; February 18, 1877 – February 2, 1958) was an American politician who served as a member of the Connecticut House of Representatives from 1939 until 1941, having lost her bid for re-election. Griffin had also served as a member of the Bridgeport City Council after her election in 1935 and until her defeat in 1949.

== Biography ==
Sadie K. Griffin was born in North Baltimore, Ohio, on February 18, 1877, to Robert and Mary O'Leary Dempsey. She spent much of her early life being raised in upstate New York. It wasn't until 1918 at the age of forty-one that she moved to Bridgeport, Connecticut, in order to take a job at a grocery store. It was while in Bridgeport she married Harry Griffin.

During the 1935 Bridgeport municipal elections, Griffin and fifteen other members of the Socialist Party won seats on the Bridgeport City Council. The first woman to serve on the council, she would serve for fourteen years before losing re-election in 1949, an election which marked a substantial decline in support for the Socialists. She also served a single term in the Connecticut House of Representatives representing the city of Bridgeport. A close ally of mayor Jasper McLevy, Griffin was appointed to several city and county offices. She was chairwoman of the Bridgeport Tax Review Unit from 1948 until her death.

== Sources ==
- Ross, Jack (April 15, 2015). "Socialist Elected Officeholders, 1897– 1960". The Socialist Party of America: A Complete History. Lincoln, Nebraska: Potomac Books. University of Nebraska Press. pp. 609–638. doi:10.2307/j.ctt1d98c2g. ISBN 978-1612344904. JSTOR j.ctt1d98c2g. OL 29260092M.
- Bucki, Cecelia (2001). Bridgeport's Socialist New Deal, 1915-36. Chicago, Illinois: University of Illinois Press. ISBN 978-0-252-02687-4.
