= T. Clark Hull =

American judge (1921–1996)

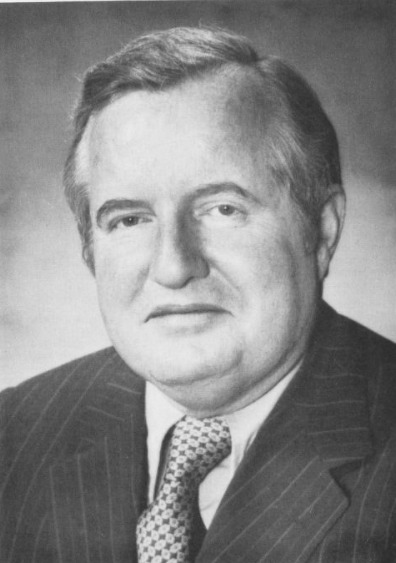

99th Lieutenant Governor of Connecticut
- In office January 6, 1971 – June 1, 1973
- Governor: Thomas J. Meskill
- Preceded by: Attilio R. Frassinelli
- Succeeded by: Peter L. Cashman

Member of the Connecticut State Senate from the 24th district
- In office 1963–1971
- Preceded by: Howard A. Hueston
- Succeeded by: Romeo G. Petroni

Personal details
- Born: Treat Clark Hull; June 14, 1921 Danbury, Connecticut, U.S.
- Died: July 25, 1996 (aged 75)
- Party: Republican
- Education: Phillips Exeter Academy; Yale University (BA); Harvard Law School
- Occupation: Politician, lawyer, judge

Military service
- Allegiance: United States
- Branch/service: United States Air Force
- Years of service: 1942–1946

Treat Clark Hull (June 14, 1921 – July 25, 1996) was an American politician and lawyer who was the 99th Lieutenant Governor of Connecticut from 1971 to 1973 and a judge for 23 years from 1973. Hull had the rare distinction of serving at the top levels of all three branches of state government (executive, legislative and judicial).

== Early life ==
T. Clark Hull was born in Danbury, Fairfield County, Connecticut, on June 14, 1921. He went to school in the Phillips Exeter Academy in New Hampshire, then he went to Yale University, where he got a B.A. in 1942 He served in the United States Air Force from 1942 to 1946, then earned a law degree from Harvard Law School in 1948 and practiced law in Danbury from 1948 to 1973.

== Political career ==
Hull served as a Republican member of the Connecticut State Senate for the 24th district from 1963 to 1971. At the Republican state convention in 1970, he was given the job of entertaining the delegates while the party leaders chose a candidate for lieutenant governor, and did so well that, upon the return of the party leaders, the delegates chanted that they wanted him. He won the nomination and won the election on the ticket with gubernatorial candidate Thomas J. Meskill.

== Judge ==
In 1973, Hull was appointed as a judge of the Connecticut Superior Court. He was elevated to the Appellate Court in 1983 as one of its original members. He was subsequently appointed to the Connecticut Supreme Court in 1987. After mandatory retirement from the Supreme Court in 1991, due to his age, he continued hearing civil cases as a state referee. He was succeeded by Robert I. Berdon.

He died on July 25, 1996, after complications from heart surgery a week earlier.

== Legacy ==
Hull was known for his sharp wit, charm, and zest for public service. Former Democratic Senator Chris Dodd described Hull as "one of the few politicians who managed to be well-liked on both sides of the aisle. Throughout his illustrious career, he maintained an optimistic activism that continually propelled the interests of Connecticut and its people forward. Justice Hull was a dedicated public servant who had an enthusiasm for public office that was contagious. Although he was small in stature, T. Clark Hull's charming personality and exuberance for serving the public made him a giant in the eyes of others."

Party political offices
Preceded by John L. Gerardo	Republican nominee for Lieutenant Governor of Connecticut; 1970	Succeeded by Nathan Agostinelli
Connecticut State Senate
Preceded by Howard A. Hueston	Member of the Connecticut State Senate from the 24th district 1963–1971	Succeeded by Romeo G. Petroni
Political offices
Preceded by Attilio R. Frassinelli	Lieutenant Governor of Connecticut; 1971–1973	Succeeded by Peter L. Cashman
