= Lou Darvas =

American cartoonist

Louis F. Darvas (July 30, 1913 – February 10, 1987) was an American artist and sports cartoonist. He received the National Cartoonist Society Sports Cartoon Award for 1963 and 1967 for his work.

He also authored a book called "You Can Draw Cartoons", published in 1960 by Doubleday.

== Background ==
Darvas was born in Cleveland, Ohio. He started his artistic journey as a cartoonist at Thomas Jefferson Junior High School, and then at the West Technical High School through the 11th grade. He then got a job scrapping old signs for an advertising firm, while he followed his cartoonist training in night art classes at John Huntington Institute.

== Career ==
Darvas's first newspaper job was with the Toledo News Bee as an artist. He moved to Cleveland and worked with the Cleveland Press from 1938 onwards.

During World War II, he served in the United States Army Air Corps as head of the drafting and art room of the senior staff school supervising charts and graphs for secret Air Force statistical records. During his stint in the Army, he won the first place for cartoons in the art show of the Army Air Corps Tactical Center at Orlando, Florida in 1944.

He was the author of a daily comic strip called "Haff Nelson" for the Chicago Sun-Times Syndicate for a year before returning to Cleveland Press.

His work appeared regularly from 1946 onwards on the cover of the Sporting News.

Lou Darvas died aged 73, and was survived by his wife Margaret, his daughters Janet and Laura, his son Robert, his stepdaughter Terry Rohde, 2 grandchildren and a sister.

== Awards ==
He was inducted into the Hall of Fame of the Sports Media Association and received the National Cartoonist Society Award for the best work in the field of sports in 1964 and 1968.
