= Benedict Garmisa =

American politician

Member of the Illinois House of Representatives

Personal details
- Party: Democratic

Benedict I. "Sparky" Garmisa (May 22, 1913 – January 30, 1985) was an American politician.

Born in Chicago, Illinois, Garmisa served in the United States Army during World War II, He went to Northwestern University, Loyola University Chicago, and was the executive director for Chicago Street Traffic Commission. Garmisa was a Democrat. In 1955, Garmisa served in the Illinois State Senate and then in the Illinois House of Representatives. In 1956, Garmisa ran for Circuit Court Clerk for Cook County, Illinois and lost the election. Garmisa died in a hospital in West Palm Beach, Florida after suffering a heart attack while on vacation.
