= Jean Murrell Capers =

American judge

- Jean Murrell Capers, from a 1966 newspaper
- Born: January 11, 1913; Georgetown, Kentucky
- Died: July 18, 2017 (aged 104); Cleveland, Ohio
- Known for: Jurist, educator

Eugenia "Jean" Marie Murrell Strode Capers (January 11, 1913 – July 18, 2017) was an American judge, educator, and politician.

== Early life ==
Born to Dolly Ferguson Murrell and Edward E. Murrell on January 11, 1913, Eugenia "Jean" Marie Murrell Strode Capers was a Kentucky native from Georgetown. She was one of five children. At the age of six, her and her family moved to Cleveland, Ohio due to Edward Murrell's desire for his children to attend an integrated school. Dolly Ferguson had her primary schooling in an integrated Ohio school while Edward Murrell was educated in the segregated Kentucky system. The two met at Kentucky's State Normal School for Colored Persons, now Kentucky State University. Capers' parents firmly believed that a strong education will open doors to future success; a concept that Capers would pass on to generations of children to come.

== Education and career ==
Following in her parents' footsteps, Capers became an educator, receiving a degree in 1932 from Western Reserve University, now Case Western Reserve University, one of few African Americans to do so at the time. She attended Western Reserve on a full scholarship. Her education degree was used as she taught as an elementary school and later high school health and physical education instructor in the Cleveland school system for a five-year span.

Inspired to do more for her community, Capers later attended Cleveland Law School, becoming an attorney in 1945. Between 1945 and 1949, Capers served as an assistant police prosecutor in Cleveland for Mayor Thomas A. Burke. Then, after two terms of running, she was voted into the Cleveland City Council in 1949; the first African American to earn this distinction as well as the first democrat to win over her republican city sector. During her time on the Council, Capers fought against an urban renewal program that she believed would negatively impact African American communities of Cleveland. After 10 years, in 1959, her appointment to the Cleveland City Council ended due to failed re-election, losing to democratic candidate James H. Bell, however, Capers continued her public service career by becoming an assistant Attorney General for the state of Ohio. During this time, she continued running for state senate and Cleveland City Council Offices. 1971 had another attempt for office, this time for mayor, but she did not receive enough support to be included in the vote as an independent. She lost an election again in 1976 when running for Juvenile Court Judge.

In 1977, James Rhodes, the Ohio Governor, appointed Capers to Cleveland Municipal Court Judge. In 1986, she was forced to retire from the position due to age limits. Capers continued running for assorted offices, including the 11th Congressional District seat of Ohio in 1998, which she lost to Stephanie Tubbs Jones. She continued practicing law as a private consultant, specializing in family and senior law, until 2011.

=== Opposition, controversy and backlash ===
Capers was quick to speak out about what she believed was right, or what she thought would benefit her constituents. She was very outspoken against the Urban Renewal Project which was said to be the "Negro Removal" effort. Capers emphasized that the project was causing much more harm than good, especially on the African American population. She also went against the wishes of local religious leaders by securing a license for a bingo parlor in her district. Her opposition to the control of fluoride in public drinking water went against others in the Democratic party. Many politicians were eager to point out Caper's less than perfect council meeting attendance record and conspiracies regarding her potential affiliation with rackets figures. They also accused her of fraud during the elections of 1952.

Even though Capers had previously been a columnist for The Cleveland Call and Post, an African American owned Republican publication, in the 1930s, the paper openly criticized her political initiatives, beliefs, and motives for a portion of her career, calling her "irresponsible" and "vicious." The Call and Post eventually changed their tune, endorsing Capers when she ran for Juvenile Court Judge as part of the Republican party.

== Personal life and death ==
For a short time in 1937, she was married to a Mississippi man, James Strode, and later eloped with Clifford E. Capers of Tennessee in 1943. While she never had children of her own, she helped raise her nephews, Paul Murrell Rose, Robert Ferguson Rose, and Edward Ellsworth Rose. In return, Paul and Robert Rose assisted Capers in campaigning. Capers was also assisted in campaigning by her father as he was the owner and operator of a publication company, Murrell Printing Company, that printed The Informer. As a young woman, she was athletic and received awards in tennis and basketball, even though she was never more than 5'3". A city tennis court at Cleveland's Rockefeller Park is named in her honor. In 1938, she won the Greater Cleveland Tennis Championship; the first African American female to do so. She was actively involved in the Central Welfare Association and the National Council of Negro Women. In 1968, she founded the Black Women's Forum. Late in life, she resided in Judson Manor, a retirement community in Cleveland. On July 18, 2017, at the age of 104, Jean Capers died in her sleep. Preceding her in death was her second husband, Clifford Capers, who died in 1996.

=== Legacy ===
Jean Capers wished to be remembered as a devout Christian who was dedicated to continually learning about the law and "loved to think." She continues to be a role model and inspiration for the city of Cleveland, being revered for shattering the glass ceiling and trailblazing the field of law for African American and women.

== Awards and recognition ==
- N.C.N.W. Outstanding Women in Public Service, 1950
- Honorary Doctor of Laws degree, Case Western Reserve University School of Law, 2009
- Ohio State Bar Association Nettie Cronise Lutes Award, 2011
- Cleveland City Club Hall of Fame Inductee, 2015
- Cleveland YWCA Lifetime Achievement Award
- Ohio Women's Hall of Fame Inductee
- Norman S. Minor Bar Association Trailblazer Award
- Ohio Civil Rights Hall of Fame Inductee
- Distinguished Alumni Award, Case Western Reserve University
