= William L. Beers =

American politician

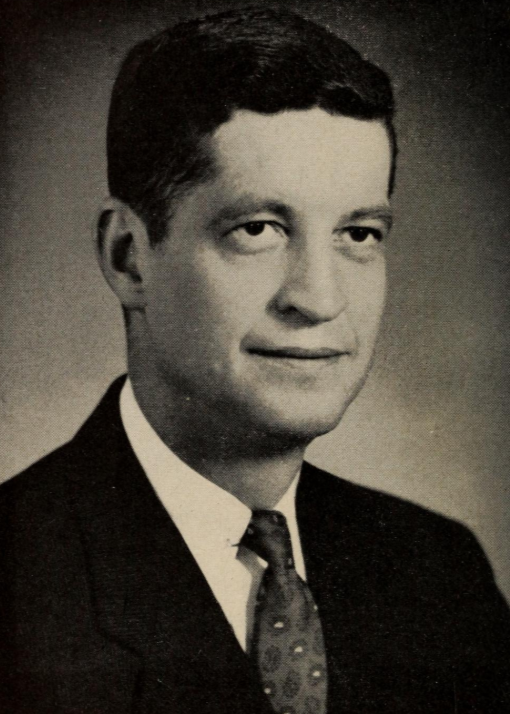

15th Attorney General of Connecticut
- In office August 24, 1953 – January 5, 1955
- Governor: John Davis Lodge
- Preceded by: George C. Conway
- Succeeded by: John J. Bracken

Personal details
- Born: August 17, 1904 Guilford, Connecticut
- Died: January 14, 1955 (aged 50) New Haven, Connecticut
- Party: Republican
- Education: Trinity College (BA); Yale University (LL.B.)

William L. Beers (August 17, 1904 – January 14, 1955) was an American politician who served as the Attorney General of Connecticut from 1953 to 1955.

He died on January 14, 1955, in New Haven, Connecticut at age 50.
