= Peter L. Cashman =

American politician (born 1936)

Peter Cashman
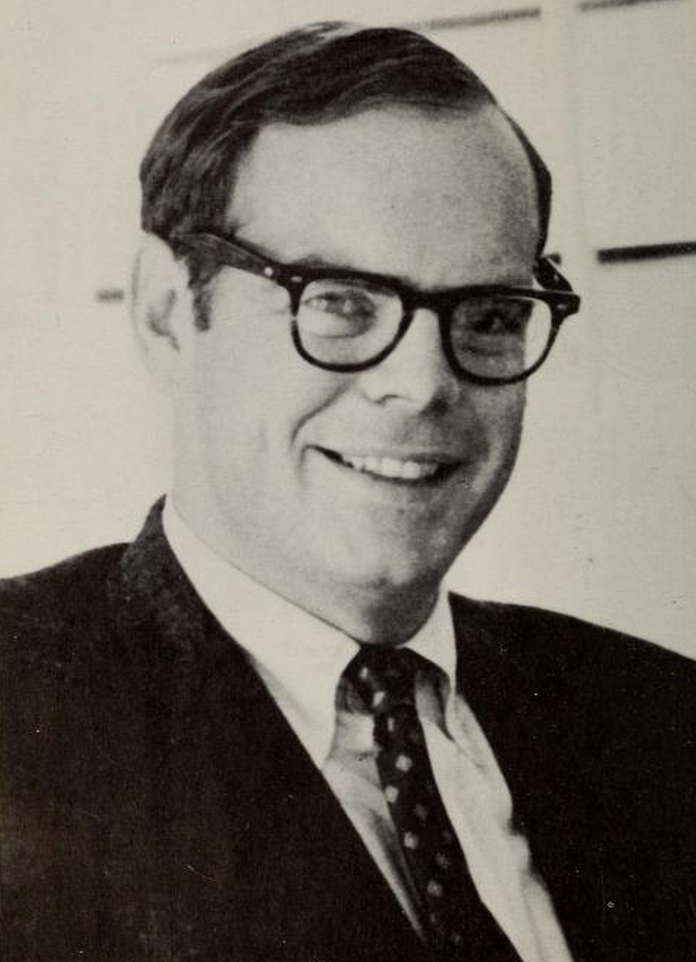

100th Lieutenant Governor of Connecticut
- In office June 7, 1973 – January 8, 1975
- Governor: Thomas J. Meskill
- Preceded by: T. Clark Hull
- Succeeded by: Robert K. Killian

Personal details
- Born: May 22, 1936 (age 90) Cleveland, Ohio, U.S.
- Party: Republican
- Spouse: Diane Cashman
- Children: Robert Stafford Green Cashman, Johanna Cashman Calcagni, Emily Aloise Cashman
- Education: Yale College

Peter L. Cashman (born May 22, 1936) is an American politician who served as the 100th lieutenant governor of Connecticut from 1973 to 1975.

== Biography ==
Cashman was born in Cleveland, Ohio. He graduated from Yale University in 1959 with a BA in American Studies.

Cashman lived in Lyme, Connecticut. He was an alternate delegate to Republican National Convention from Connecticut in 1972. From 1970 to 1976, he served as a member of the Connecticut Senate and was President Pro Tempore. and Lt. Governor. Succeeded to the office of Lieutenant Governor by virtue of being President Pro Tempore of the Senate. Took oath of office on June 7, 1973.

In 2012, Cashman worked in Fairfield as the managing director of Building Energy Performance Assessment News, a newsletter on energy consumption.

Cashman is an active investor in commercial real estate and a director of Connecticut Innovations, Inc. He was a member of the Connecticut Clean Energy Fund advisory board, a quasi public corporation owned by the State of Connecticut that both promotes energy conservation and invests in new energy technologies. He is the past chairman of both Environmental Data Resources, Inc. and The Sanborn Map Company.

Political offices
Preceded by T. Clark Hull	Lieutenant Governor of Connecticut; 1973-1975	Succeeded by Robert K. Killian
