= Hidden Valley Downs =

Horse racing track in Reno County, Kansas

- Location: Medora, Reno County, Kansas
- Owned by: Bill Rowland
- Date opened: April 1966

Hidden Valley Downs was a half-mile horse racing track located on Summers Road near Medora, Reno County, Kansas. It operated from 1966 to 1971.

== History ==
In October 1965, real-estate agent Bill Rowland of Hutchinson, Kansas purchased 320 acres (130 ha) of land in Medora near his hometown, and spent $250,000 on its transformation into Hidden Valley Oasis by the following April. It was so called because, according to Rowland's brother-in-law O.J. Martens, "Any direction you look are trees, no houses or highways." Its track, half a mile in length, was "built to American Quarterhorse Association specifications".

The privately owned bush track hosted informal American Quarter Horse, and Thoroughbred events. Bush tracks are unregulated by state commissions and are noted for "anything goes" racing. Many famous horses raced at the track including Kentucky Derby winner Black Gold.

Hidden Valley Downs, as it was also called by then, had been in operation for only six months when it gained minor notoriety thanks to an exposé by Sports Illustrated magazine's Jack Olsen. Olsen had researched for the story at the facility, a month beforehand, without Rowland's knowledge; Rowland clarified that gambling was not held at the premises (despite the magazine's claims and allegations by other parties), and that its riding stable was the only source of income there. "[What happens here] is a lot different than the headlines," he told The Wichita Eagle.

The track closed in 1971 and the land remains privately owned.
