= Mary Ann DeWeese =

Mary Ann DeWeese (1913–1993) was an American sportswear designer. Appliquéd swimsuits and matching his-and-hers swimwear and sportswear are among the fashion firsts credited to DeWeese.

The Kansas-born designer began working for Los Angeles Knitting Mills in the 1930s and created sportswear for Sandeze before joining Catalina Knitting Mills (Catalina Sportswear), where she developed a reputation for creating playful, well-constructed fashions. Her matching Sweethearts in Swimsuits line for men and women in the 1940s further increased her reputation for innovation at Catalina. In 1951, she founded the sportswear and swimwear company DeWeese Designs in Los Angeles, where her sundresses and loungewear were successful. She continued to experiment with texture and introduced innovations such as the stretch strap for clothing and swimwear. DeWeese Designs remained in operation until the 1980s.

DeWeese married Fritz Weingarten in 1936. He preceded her in death. She is survived by two sons, John William Weingarten and James Werner Weingarten, both of Southern California. Other survivors include three sisters, Jean Cordts, Prescott, Ariz., Margaret Stolarik, Spanawash, Wash., and Emily Hooper, Osage City, two brothers, David DeWeese and Jack DeWeese, both of Wamego, and five grand- children.

DeWeese died in 1993.
