= John J. Bracken =

American politician (1908–1994)

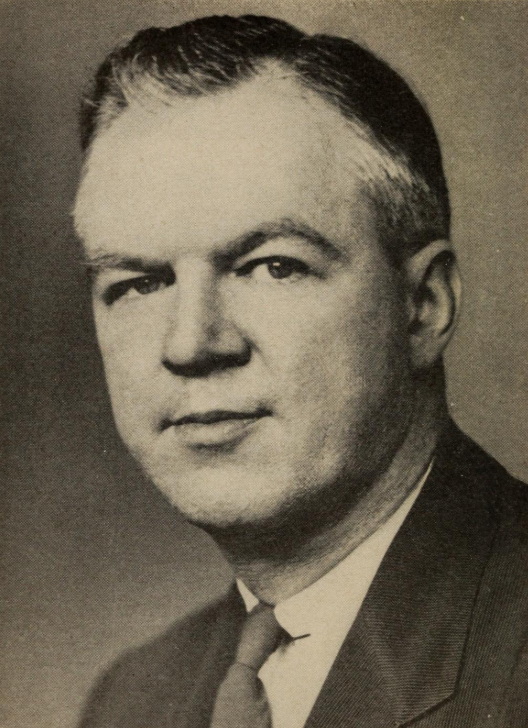

16th Attorney General of Connecticut
- In office January 5, 1955 – January 7, 1959
- Governor: Abraham Ribicoff
- Preceded by: William L. Beers
- Succeeded by: Albert L. Coles

Personal details
- Born: February 11, 1908; Hartford, Connecticut
- Died: January 23, 1994 (aged 85); Hartford, Connecticut
- Political party: Republican

John J. Bracken (February 11, 1908 – January 23, 1994) was an American politician who served as the Attorney General of Connecticut from 1955 to 1959.

He died on January 23, 1994, in Hartford, Connecticut at age 85. To date, he is the last Republican Attorney General of the state.
