= Albert L. Coles =

American politician (1909–1978)

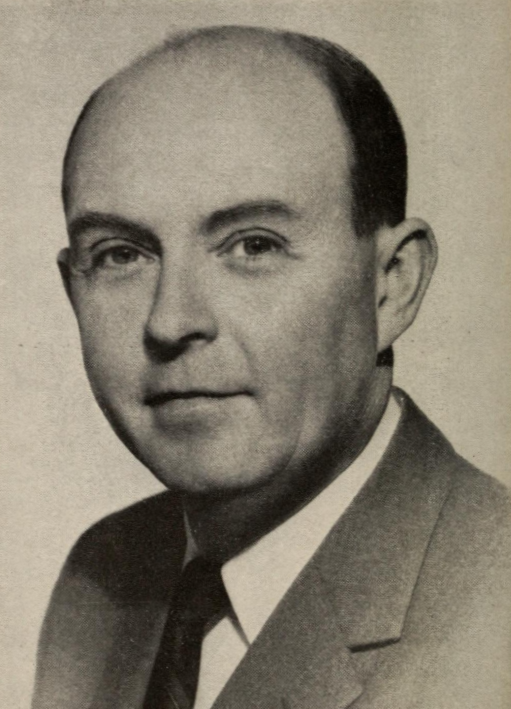

17th Attorney General of Connecticut
- In office January 7, 1959 – 1963
- Governor: Abraham Ribicoff; John N. Dempsey
- Preceded by: John J. Bracken
- Succeeded by: Harold M. Mulvey

Member of the Connecticut State Senate from the 22nd district
- In office 1939–1947
- Preceded by: Americo Scanzillo

Personal details
- Born: November 8, 1909 Bridgeport, Connecticut, U.S.
- Died: December 18, 1978 (aged 69) Bridgeport, Connecticut, U.S.
- Party: Democratic
- Education: Yale University (BA, LL.B.)

Albert L. Coles (November 8, 1909 – December 18, 1978) was an American politician who served in the Connecticut State Senate from the 22nd district from 1939 to 1947 and as the Attorney General of Connecticut from 1959 to 1963.
