= Fred J. Doocy =

American politician and banker (1913–2017)

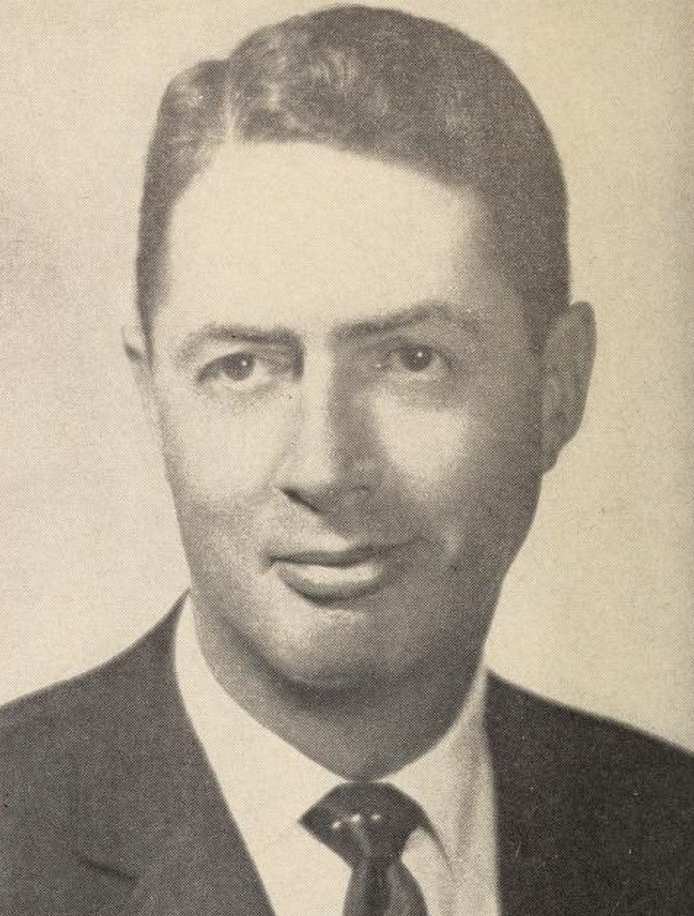

97th Lieutenant Governor of Connecticut
- In office January 15, 1966 – January 4, 1967
- Governor: John N. Dempsey
- Preceded by: Samuel J. Tedesco
- Succeeded by: Attilio R. Frassinelli

Member of the Connecticut Senate from the 4th district
- In office 1959–1967
- Preceded by: Elmer Watson
- Succeeded by: David M. Barry

Personal details
- Born: May 5, 1913 Hartford, Connecticut, U.S.
- Died: December 7, 2017 (aged 104) Manchester, Connecticut, U.S.
- Party: Democratic
- Spouse: Mary O'Keefe (m. 1942; died 2010)
- Children: 5
- Education: Rutgers University

Frederick J. Doocy (May 5, 1913 – December 7, 2017) was an American politician and banker.

== Biography ==
Doocy was born in 1913 in Hartford, Connecticut. After attending East Harford High School, the American Institute of Banking, Graduate Institute of Banking, and Rutgers University, Doocy worked as a banker at Hartford National Bank & Trust as a bookkeeper. He would later return after World War II in 1945 and assume the position as Assistant Treasurer. A World War II veteran in the United States Air Force, he was active in South Windsor town politics for many years. He served three terms as town treasurer, before being elected to the State Senate for the 4th District in 1958 as a Democrat. He remained town treasurer until 1959. He would be reelected to the Senate in 1960 and 1962 additionally.

Doocy was the 97th Lieutenant Governor of Connecticut from 1966 to 1967, assuming the office when Samuel J. Tedesco resigned. He had formerly served as President pro tempore of the Connecticut Senate, serving from 1963 until his appointment as Lieutenant Governor.

He married Mary O'Keefe (1916–2010) in 1942 and had five children. He was a member of the South Windsor American Legion chapter, Rotary Club in East Hartford, and Chamber of Commerce in East Hartford, where he was a former president. In 2013, Doocy turned 100 and was honored with a party at his home, Arbors of Hop Brook Retirement Community in Manchester, Connecticut. It was attended by many local legislators and dignitaries, among them Connecticut Congressman John Larson. Doocy died on December 7, 2017, in Manchester, Connecticut, at the age of 104.

Political offices
Preceded by Samuel J. Tedesco	Lieutenant Governor of Connecticut; 1966–1967	Succeeded by Attilio R. Frassinelli
