= Samuel J. Tedesco =

American politician (1915–2003)

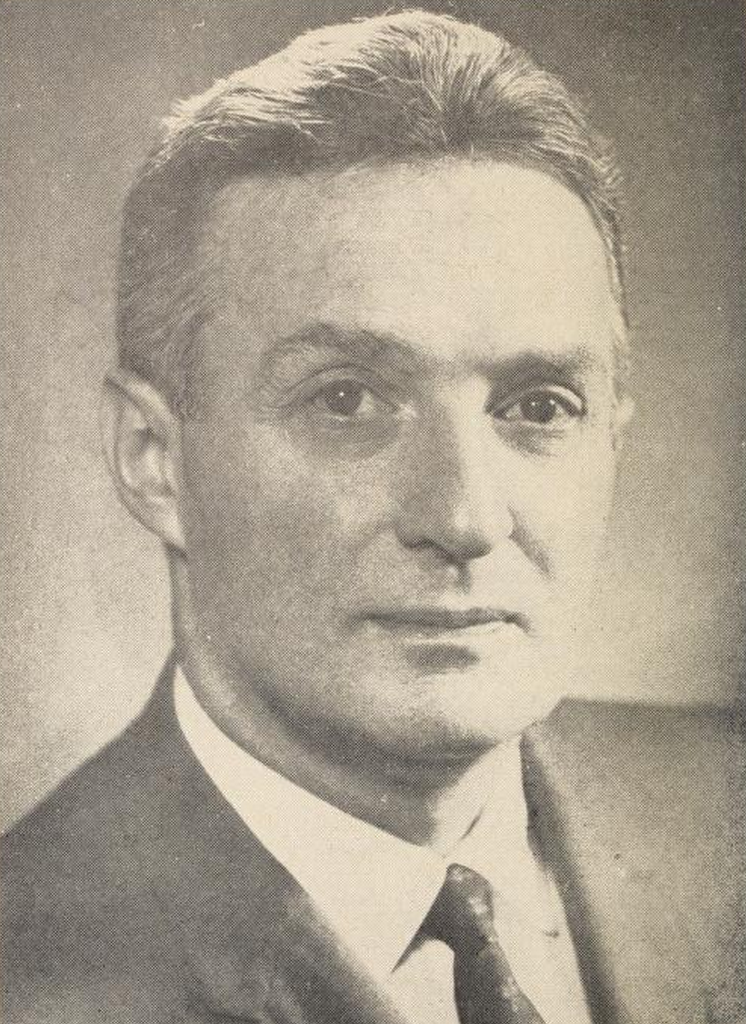

96th Lieutenant Governor of Connecticut
- In office 1963–1966
- Governor: John N. Dempsey
- Preceded by: Anthony J. Armentano
- Succeeded by: Fred J. Doocy

44th Mayor of Bridgeport, Connecticut
- In office November 11, 1957 – November 8, 1965
- Preceded by: Jasper McLevy
- Succeeded by: Hugh C. Curran

Member of the Connecticut House of Representatives from Bridgeport
- In office 1941–1943 Serving with Milton J. Herman
- Preceded by: Sadie Griffin; William S. Neil
- Succeeded by: Milton J. Herman; Charles F. Dowd

Personal details
- Born: February 21, 1915 Bridgeport, Connecticut, U.S.
- Died: August 5, 2003 (aged 88) Piedmont, California, U.S.
- Party: Democratic
- Spouse: Evelyn DeGruttola Tedesco
- Children: 1
- Relatives: Jane Tedesco (stepmother)
- Education: Boston University

Samuel J. Tedesco (February 21, 1915 – August 5, 2003) was an American politician, lawyer, and jurist who was the 96th Lieutenant Governor of Connecticut from 1963 to 1966. He also served as Mayor of Bridgeport and as a judge.

== Early life and career ==
He was born to an Italian immigrant family in Bridgeport, Connecticut, the son of Joseph Tedesco and Elizabeth (née Gelormino) Tedesco. Following Elizabeth's death, Joseph married her sister, politician Jane Tedesco. He received his bachelor's degree from the University of Kentucky, and his law degree from Boston University. He was a member of the Connecticut House of Representatives from 1941 to 1943, representing the city of Bridgeport alongside Milton J. Herman. He subsequently fought in WWII, serving in the European theater in France and Belgium.

Following the war, Tedesco was elected to the Connecticut Senate as a Democrat, and served as Minority Leader. After leaving the senate in 1953, he defeated incumbent Jasper McLevy to become mayor of Bridgeport, Connecticut in 1957. He was elected Lieutenant Governor in 1963. Following his concurrent lieutenant governorship and mayorship, he was a Superior court judge and later administrative judge of Fairfield County. He was disbarred and fined in 1976 for notarizing a forged signature. Tedesco retired as a judge in 1980.

== Later life ==
He and his wife moved to California in 1989, where he died 14 years later of pneumonia.

Political offices
Preceded by Anthony J. Armentano	Lieutenant Governor of Connecticut; 1963-1966	Succeeded by Fred J. Doocy
