= John N. Dempsey =

American politician (1915–1989)

John Dempsey
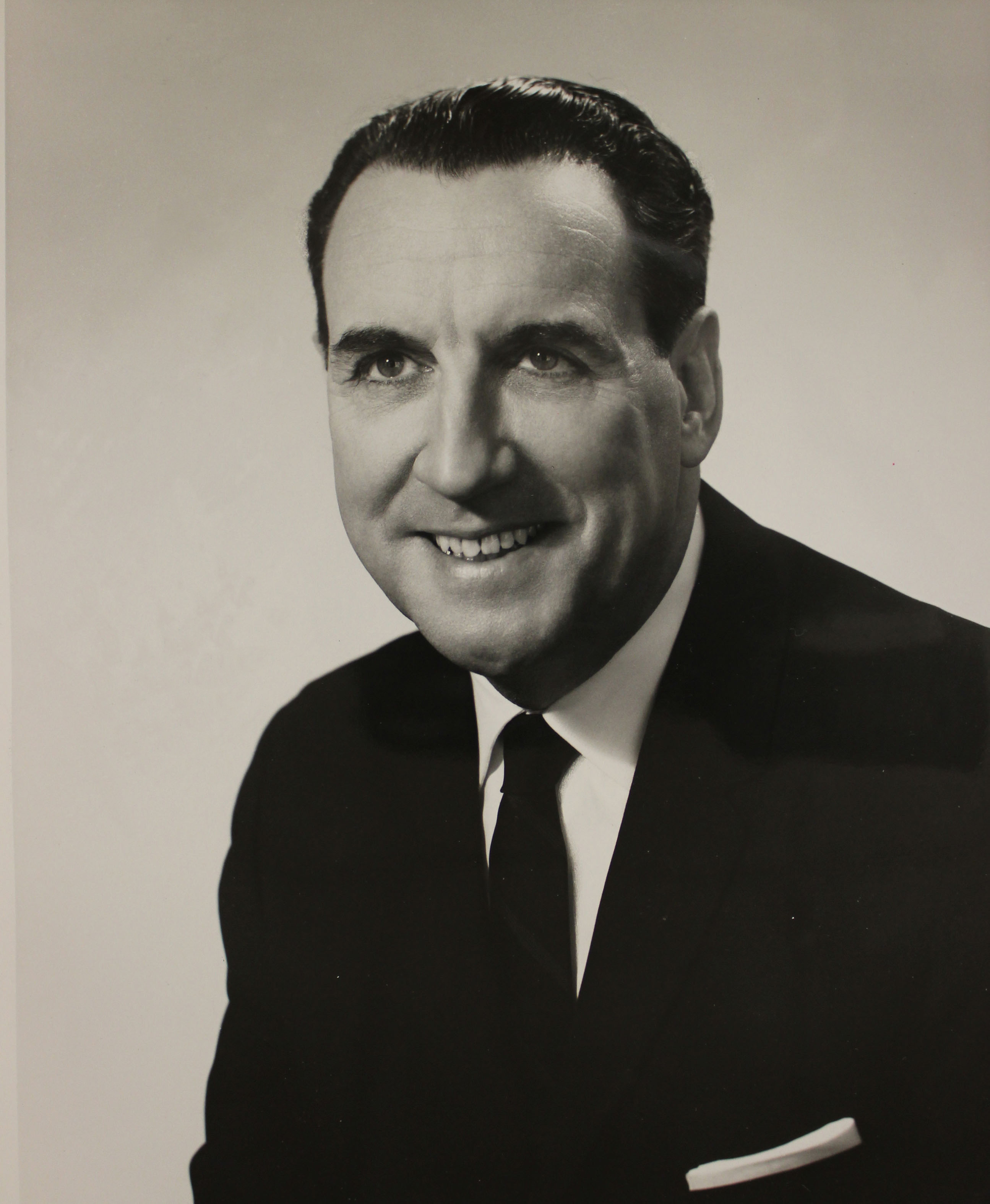

81st Governor of Connecticut
- In office January 21, 1961 – January 6, 1971
- Lieutenant: Anthony J. Armentano; Samuel J. Tedesco; Fred J. Doocy; Attilio R. Frassinelli
- Preceded by: Abraham Ribicoff
- Succeeded by: Thomas Meskill

94th Lieutenant Governor of Connecticut
- In office January 7, 1959 – January 21, 1961
- Governor: Abraham Ribicoff
- Preceded by: Charles Jewett
- Succeeded by: Anthony J. Armentano

Personal details
- Born: John Noel Dempsey; January 3, 1915 Cahir, County Tipperary, Ireland
- Died: July 16, 1989 (aged 74) Killingly, Connecticut, U.S.
- Party: Democratic
- Spouse: Mary Frey (m. 1940)
- Education: Providence College

John Noel Dempsey (January 3, 1915 – July 16, 1989) was an American politician who was the 81st governor of Connecticut. He was a Democrat, and began his political career at the age of 21 serving on the Putnam City Council. He later served as mayor of Putnam, before being elected to Governor of Connecticut.

== Biography ==
Dempsey was born in Cahir, County Tipperary, Ireland. He was the only son of a career British Army officer. In 1925, the family moved to Putnam, Connecticut, in the northeastern corner of the state. He worked there in the textile industry and then in the Town Hall, which made the start for his rise in state politics. While living in Putnam, Dempsey was the Soccer Coach at the Pomfret School in Pomfret. He was married to Mary Frey and they had three sons and a daughter.

== Political career ==
In 1936, at the age of 21, Dempsey was elected to the Putnam City Council, and in 1948 he began the first of six terms as mayor. He was elected to the Connecticut House of Representatives in 1949, but managed to divide his time between state and local affairs. He served in the General Assembly until 1955, when he became executive secretary of governor Abraham A. Ribicoff.

Dempsey was the 94th Lieutenant Governor of Connecticut during Ribicoff's last term as governor, from 1959 to 1961. When Ribicoff resigned as Governor of Connecticut to become a member of President John F. Kennedy's Cabinet, Dempsey succeeded him, becoming the first person to hold this position since the early colonial period who had been born in Europe. He also began a 30-year period in which the former Puritan colony had only Catholic governors in office. In 1969, leaders of both parties introduced the Legislative Management Act to establish support staff and control the operating budget of the Assembly. Both houses voted unanimously to override his veto. He was an ally of party chairman John M. Bailey. He chose not to run for re-election in 1970 and was succeeded by Republican Thomas J. Meskill. During his tenure, he served on the Advisory Commission on Intergovernmental Relations, the National Governors Association Executive Committee from 1968 to 1969; also chaired the New England Governors Association from 1963 to 1965 and the Democratic Governors Association from 1969 to 1970. After leaving office, Dempsey became the President of the Indian Trails Council of the Boy Scouts of America.

== Death and legacy ==
The University of Connecticut Health Center in Farmington, Connecticut, is known as John Dempsey Hospital. He was treated for lung cancer there himself in the last month of his life. He died at his home in Killingly, Connecticut, on July 16, 1989, at the age of 74.

His son, John N. Dempsey Jr., was chairman of the Connecticut Democratic Party from 1978 to 1980.

== See also ==
- List of United States governors born outside the United States

Political offices
Preceded by Charles Jewett	Lieutenant Governor of Connecticut; 1959–1961	Succeeded by Anthony J. Armentano
Preceded by Abraham A. Ribicoff	Governor of Connecticut; 1961–1971	Succeeded by Thomas Meskill
Party political offices
Preceded by Abraham A. Ribicoff	Democratic nominee for Governor of Connecticut; 1962, 1966	Succeeded by Emilio Q. Daddario
Preceded by Robert Evander McNair	Chair of the Democratic Governors Association; 1969–1970	Succeeded by Robert W. Scott
