= 1999 in the United States =

- Decades: 1970s; 1980s; 1990s; 2000s; 2010s
- See also: History of the United States (1991–2016); Timeline of United States history (1990–2009); List of years in the United States

Events from the year 1999 in the United States.

== Incumbents ==
=== Federal government ===
- President: Bill Clinton (D-Arkansas)
- Vice President: Al Gore (D-Tennessee)
- Chief Justice: William Rehnquist (Virginia)
- Speaker of the House of Representatives:

Newt Gingrich (R-Georgia) (until January 3)
Dennis Hastert (R-Illinois) (starting January 6)

- Senate Majority Leader: Trent Lott (R-Mississippi)
- Congress: 105th (until January 3), 106th (starting January 3)

==== State governments ====
Governors and lieutenant governors

=== Governors ===
- Governor of Alabama: Fob James (Republican) (until January 18), Don Siegelman (Democratic) (starting January 18)
- Governor of Alaska: Tony Knowles (Democratic)
- Governor of Arizona: Jane Dee Hull (Republican)
- Governor of Arkansas: Mike Huckabee (Republican)
- Governor of California: Pete Wilson (Republican) (until January 4), Gray Davis (Democratic) (starting January 4)
- Governor of Colorado: Roy Romer (Democratic) (until January 12), Bill Owens (Republican) (starting January 12)
- Governor of Connecticut: John G. Rowland (Republican)
- Governor of Delaware: Thomas R. Carper (Democratic)
- Governor of Florida: Buddy MacKay (Democratic) (until January 5), Jeb Bush (Republican) (starting January 5)
- Governor of Georgia: Zell Miller (Democratic) (until January 11), Roy Barnes (Democratic) (starting January 11)
- Governor of Hawaii: Ben Cayetano (Democratic)
- Governor of Idaho: Phil Batt (Republican) (until January 4), Dirk Kempthorne (Republican) (starting January 4)
- Governor of Illinois: Jim Edgar (Republican) (until January 11), George Ryan (Republican) (starting January 11)
- Governor of Indiana: Frank O'Bannon (Democratic)
- Governor of Iowa: Terry E. Branstad (Republican) (until January 15), Tom Vilsack (Democratic) (starting January 15)
- Governor of Kansas: Bill Graves (Republican)
- Governor of Kentucky: Paul E. Patton (Democratic)
- Governor of Louisiana: Murphy J. Foster Jr. (Republican)
- Governor of Maine: Angus King (Independent)
- Governor of Maryland: Parris N. Glendening (Democratic)
- Governor of Massachusetts: Paul Cellucci (Republican)
- Governor of Michigan: John Engler (Republican)
- Governor of Minnesota: Arne H. Carlson (Republican) (until January 4), Jesse Ventura (Independence) (starting January 4)
- Governor of Mississippi: Kirk Fordice (Republican)
- Governor of Missouri: Mel Carnahan (Democratic)
- Governor of Montana: Marc Racicot (Republican)
- Governor of Nebraska: Ben Nelson (Democratic) (until January 7), Mike Johanns (Republican) (starting January 7)
- Governor of Nevada: Bob Miller (Democratic) (until January 4), Kenny Guinn (Republican) (starting January 4)
- Governor of New Hampshire: Jeanne Shaheen (Democratic)
- Governor of New Jersey: Christine Todd Whitman (Republican)
- Governor of New Mexico: Gary Johnson (Republican)
- Governor of New York: George Pataki (Republican)
- Governor of North Carolina: Jim Hunt (Democratic)
- Governor of North Dakota: Ed Schafer (Republican)
- Governor of Ohio: Nancy Hollister (Republican) (until January 11), Bob Taft (Republican) (starting January 11)
- Governor of Oklahoma: Frank Keating (Republican)
- Governor of Oregon: John Kitzhaber (Democratic)
- Governor of Pennsylvania: Tom Ridge (Republican)
- Governor of Rhode Island: Lincoln C. Almond (Republican)
- Governor of South Carolina: David Beasley (Republican) (until January 13), Jim Hodges (Democratic) (starting January 13)
- Governor of South Dakota: William J. Janklow (Republican)
- Governor of Tennessee: Don Sundquist (Republican)
- Governor of Texas: George W. Bush (Republican)
- Governor of Utah: Mike Leavitt (Republican)
- Governor of Vermont: Howard Dean (Democratic)
- Governor of Virginia: Jim Gilmore (Republican)
- Governor of Washington: Gary Locke (Democratic)
- Governor of West Virginia: Cecil H. Underwood (Republican)
- Governor of Wisconsin: Tommy Thompson (Republican)
- Governor of Wyoming: Jim Geringer (Republican)

=== Lieutenant governors ===
- Lieutenant Governor of Alabama: Don Siegelman (Democratic) (until January 18), Steve Windom (Republican) (starting January 18)
- Lieutenant Governor of Alaska: Fran Ulmer (Democratic)
- Lieutenant Governor of Arkansas: Winthrop Paul Rockefeller (Republican)
- Lieutenant Governor of California: Gray Davis (Democratic) (until January 4), Cruz Bustamante (Democratic) (starting January 4)
- Lieutenant Governor of Colorado: Gail Schoettler (Democratic) (until January 12), Joe Rogers (Republican) (starting January 12)
- Lieutenant Governor of Connecticut: Jodi Rell (Republican)
- Lieutenant Governor of Delaware: Ruth Ann Minner (Democratic)
- Lieutenant Governor of Florida: vacant (until January 5), Frank Brogan (Republican) (starting January 5)
- Lieutenant Governor of Georgia: Pierre Howard (Democratic) (until January 11), Mark Taylor (Democratic) (starting January 11)
- Lieutenant Governor of Hawaii: Mazie Hirono (Democratic)
- Lieutenant Governor of Idaho: Butch Otter (Republican)
- Lieutenant Governor of Illinois: vacant (until January 11), Corinne Wood (Republican) (starting January 11)
- Lieutenant Governor of Indiana: Joe E. Kernan (Democratic)
- Lieutenant Governor of Iowa: Joy Corning (Republican) (until January 15), Sally Pederson (Democratic) (starting January 15)
- Lieutenant Governor of Kansas: Gary Sherrer (Republican)
- Lieutenant Governor of Kentucky: Steve Henry (Democratic)
- Lieutenant Governor of Louisiana: Kathleen Blanco (Democratic)
- Lieutenant Governor of Maryland: Kathleen Kennedy Townsend (Democratic)
- Lieutenant Governor of Massachusetts: Paul Cellucci (Republican) (until January 7), Jane Swift (Republican) (starting January 7)
- Lieutenant Governor of Michigan: Connie Binsfeld (Republican) (until January 1), Dick Posthumus (Republican) (starting January 1)
- Lieutenant Governor of Minnesota: Joanne E. Benson (Republican) (until January 4), Mae Schunk (Independence) (starting January 4)
- Lieutenant Governor of Mississippi: Ronnie Musgrove (Democratic)
- Lieutenant Governor of Missouri: Roger B. Wilson (Democratic)
- Lieutenant Governor of Montana: Judy Martz (Republican)
- Lieutenant Governor of Nebraska: Kim Robak (Democratic) (until January 7), David I. Maurstad (Republican) (starting January 7)
- Lieutenant Governor of Nevada: Lonnie Hammargren (Republican) (until January 4), Lorraine Hunt (Republican) (starting January 4)
- Lieutenant Governor of New Mexico: Walter Dwight Bradley (Republican)
- Lieutenant Governor of New York: Mary Donohue (Republican) (starting January 1)
- Lieutenant Governor of North Carolina: Dennis A. Wicker (Democratic)
- Lieutenant Governor of North Dakota: Rosemarie Myrdal (Republican)
- Lieutenant Governor of Ohio: vacant (until January 11), Maureen O'Connor (Republican) (starting January 11)
- Lieutenant Governor of Oklahoma: Mary Fallin (Republican)
- Lieutenant Governor of Pennsylvania: Mark S. Schweiker (Republican)
- Lieutenant Governor of Rhode Island: Bernard Jackvony (Republican) (until January 2), Charles J. Fogarty (Democratic) (starting January 2)
- Lieutenant Governor of South Carolina: Bob Peeler (Republican)
- Lieutenant Governor of South Dakota: Carole Hillard (Republican)
- Lieutenant Governor of Tennessee: John S. Wilder (Democratic)
- Lieutenant Governor of Texas: Bob Bullock (Democratic) (until January 19), Rick Perry (Republican) (starting January 19)
- Lieutenant Governor of Utah: Olene S. Walker (Republican)
- Lieutenant Governor of Vermont: Doug Racine (Democratic)
- Lieutenant Governor of Virginia: John H. Hager (Republican)
- Lieutenant Governor of Washington: Brad Owen (Democratic)
- Lieutenant Governor of Wisconsin: Scott McCallum (Republican)

== Events ==
=== January ===
- January 1 – DIY Network, a spinoff of Home and Garden Television, is launched.
- January 2 – A snowstorm leaves 14 inches (36 cm) of snow in Milwaukee, Wisconsin and 21 inches (53 cm) in Chicago, Illinois, killing 68.
- January 6 – Dennis Hastert becomes Speaker of the United States House of Representatives.
- January 7 – The Senate trial in the impeachment of President Bill Clinton begins. He had been impeached by the House of Representatives on December 19.
- January 14–17 – The Winter X Games take place in Crested Butte.
- January 21 – In one of the largest drug busts in American history, the United States Coast Guard intercepts a ship with over 9,500 pounds (4,300 kg) of cocaine aboard, headed for Houston, Texas.
- January 22 – An F3 tornado strikes downtown Clarksville, Tennessee, destroying and heavily damaging more than 500 buildings, including the historic Montgomery County Courthouse, and nationally registered Trinity Episcopal Church and Madison Street United Methodist Church.
- January 31
  - The Denver Broncos defeat the Atlanta Falcons 34–19 in Super Bowl XXXIII at Pro Player Stadium in Miami.
  - The adult animated sitcom Family Guy debuts on the Fox network after Super Bowl XXXIII.

=== February ===
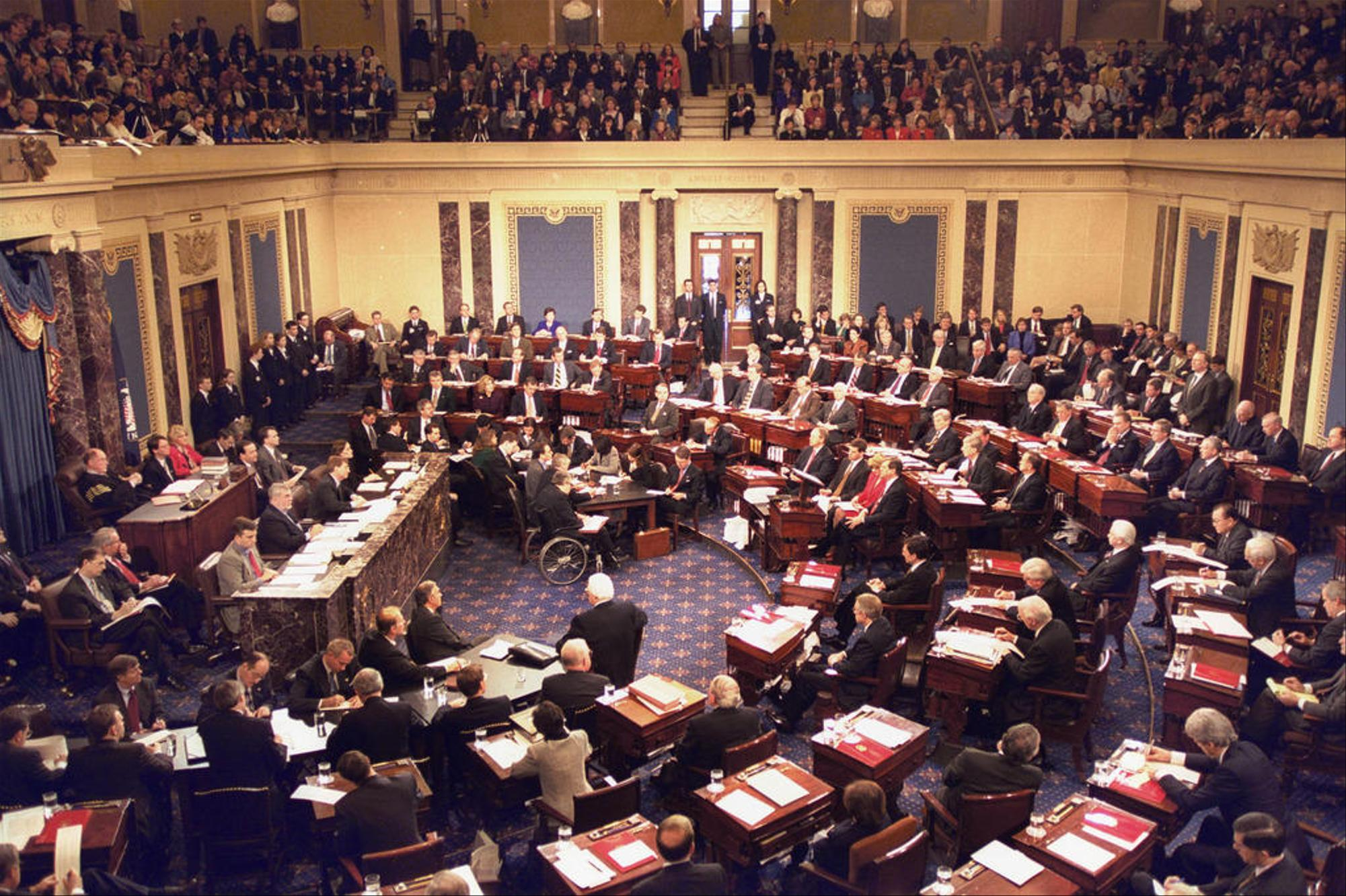
February 12: President Clinton acquitted by the Senate

- February 1 – The Disney Channel Preschool Block is rebranded as Playhouse Disney.
- February 2 – Noggin is launched.
- February 4
  - Unarmed West African immigrant Amadou Diallo is shot dead by four plainclothes New York City police officers on an unrelated stake-out, inflaming race-relations in the city.
  - The New Carissa runs aground near Coos Bay, Oregon.
- February 12 – Impeachment of Bill Clinton: President Bill Clinton is acquitted by the Senate. On the charge of perjury, 45 senators, all Republicans, voted to convict, while 55 senators, including ten Republicans and all 45 Democrats, voted for acquittal. On the charge of obstruction of justice, the vote split 50-50, with five Republicans joining all 45 Democrats voting for acquittal. Both votes fell short of the two-thirds majority (67 votes) needed for conviction.
- February 15
  - Rapper Big L is shot to death.
  - Windows Refund Day: People protest Microsoft for refusing to refund open source Linux users for the unused Windows licenses that came with their computers.
- February 19 – President Bill Clinton issues a posthumous pardon for U.S. Army Lt. Henry Ossian Flipper.
- February 23 – White supremacist John William King is found guilty of kidnapping and murdering African American James Byrd Jr. by dragging him behind a truck for 2 miles (3 km).
- February 24 – LaGrand case: The state of Arizona executes Karl LaGrand, a German national involved in an armed robbery that led to a death. Karl's brother Walter is executed a week later, in spite of Germany's legal action in the International Court of Justice to attempt to save him.

=== March ===
- March 2 – The new Mandalay Bay hotel and casino opens on the Las Vegas Strip.
- March 3 – Walter LaGrand is executed in the gas chamber in Arizona.
- March 4 – In a military court, United States Marine Corps Captain Richard J. Ashby is acquitted of the charge of reckless flying which resulted in the deaths of 20 skiers in the Italian Alps, when his low-flying jet hit a gondola cable.
- March 8 – The Supreme Court of the United States upholds the murder convictions of Timothy McVeigh for the Oklahoma City bombing.
- March 11 – Infosys becomes the first Indian company listed on the NASDAQ stock exchange.
- March 17 – The Roth IRA is introduced by U.S. Senator William V. Roth Jr.
- March 20 – Legoland California, the first Legoland outside of Europe, opens in Carlsbad, California.
- March 21 – The 71st Academy Awards, hosted by Whoopi Goldberg, are held at Dorothy Chandler Pavilion in Los Angeles, with John Madden's Shakespeare in Love winning seven awards out of 13 nominations, including Best Picture. Steven Spielberg wins his second Best Director award for Saving Private Ryan. The telecast garners over 45.5 million viewers.
- March 25 – Enron energy traders allegedly route 2,900 megawatts of electricity destined for California to the town of Silver Peak, Nevada, population 200.
- March 26 – A Michigan jury finds Dr. Jack Kevorkian guilty of second-degree murder for administering a lethal injection to a terminally ill man.
- March 27 – Kosovo War: A U.S. F-117 Nighthawk is shot down by Serbian forces.
- March 28
  - The World Wrestling Federation holds WrestleMania XV at the First Union Center in Philadelphia, Pennsylvania.
  - The science-fiction adult animated sitcom Futurama debuts on Fox.
- March 29 – For the first time, the Dow Jones Industrial Average closes above the 10,000 mark, at 10,006.78.
- March 31 – The Matrix is released in theaters.

=== April ===
April 1: ATC traffic with Korean Air Lines Flight 36 and Air China Flight 9018 as they nearly collide at O'Hare International Airport in Chicago.

- April 1 – Air China Flight 9018, a Boeing 747, taxis onto an active runway at O'Hare International Airport during the takeoff of Korean Air Flight 36, another Boeing 747, nearly resulting in a crash. Flight 36 averted a collision by taking off early and missing the Air China aircraft by 75 feet. There were 8 people on the Air China cargo plane and 379 on the Korean Air flight.
- April 5 – In Laramie, Wyoming, Russell Henderson pleads guilty to kidnapping and felony murder, in order to avoid a possible death penalty conviction for the killing of Matthew Shepard.
- April 7 – The World Trade Organization rules in favor of the United States in its long-running trade dispute with the European Union over bananas.
- April 8 – Bill Gates' personal fortune exceeds US$100 billion, thanks to the increased value of Microsoft stock.
- April 12 – U.S. President Bill Clinton is cited for contempt of court for giving "intentionally false statements" in a sexual harassment civil lawsuit.
- April 15 – Ron Williamson and Dennis Fritz are exonerated of the rape and murder of Debbie Carter and released from prison. Both had spent 11 years in prison, with Williamson on death row, and having come within five days of execution.
- April 20 – Columbine High School massacre: Two Littleton, Colorado teenagers open fire on their teachers and classmates, killing 12 students and one teacher, and then themselves. It would be the deadliest shooting at a high school in U.S. history at the time. The shooting sparks debate on school bullying, gun control and violence in the media.
- April 23 – 1999 Major League Baseball season: Fernando Tatís of the St. Louis Cardinals hits two grand slams in one inning, becoming the first and only player in MLB history to do so.
- April 28 – Bausch & Lomb announces its intent to sell Ray-Ban to the Italian eyewear conglomerate Luxottica.

=== May ===
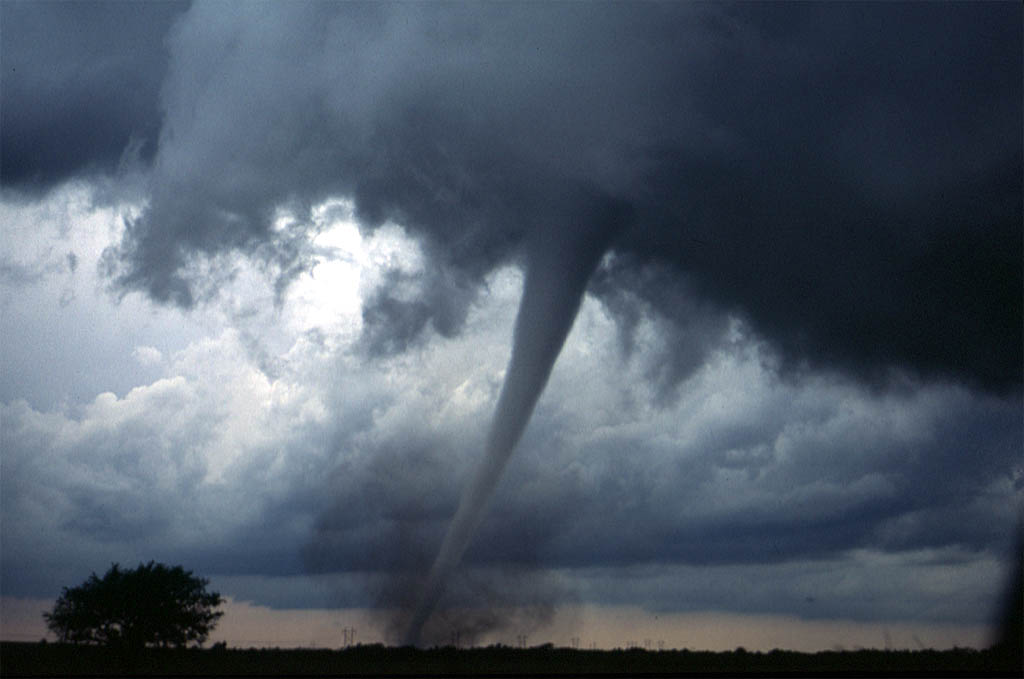
May 3 – 6: 1999 Oklahoma tornado outbreak

- May 1 – The animated children's television series SpongeBob SquarePants debuts on the cable network Nickelodeon.
- May 3
  - Norman J. Sirnic and Karen Sirnic are murdered by serial killer Angel Maturino Resendiz in Weimar, Texas.
  - The Dow Jones Industrial Average closes above 11,000 for the first time, at 11,014.70.
- May 3–6 – 1999 Oklahoma tornado outbreak spawns 140 tornadoes, including an F5 in Moore, Oklahoma that kills 38 people with the highest wind speeds ever recorded.
- May 5 – Microsoft releases Windows 98 (Second Edition).
- May 8 – Nancy Mace becomes the first female cadet to graduate from The Military College of South Carolina.
- May 9 – Mother's Day bus crash kills 22 passengers and injures another 22, including the driver in New Orleans, Louisiana.
- May 20 – American daredevil Robbie Knievel jumps 228 feet (69 m) over the Grand Canyon on a 500cc motorcycle.
- May 23 – The World Wrestling Federation holds its Over the Edge pay-per-view event at the Kemper Arena in Kansas City, Missouri, U.S. Wrestler Owen Hart falls 90 feet to his death in a stunt gone wrong.
- May 25 – The United States House of Representatives releases the Cox Report which details the People's Republic of China's nuclear espionage against the U.S. over the prior two decades.
- May 29 – Space Shuttle Discovery completes the first docking with the International Space Station.
- May 31 – Sean Elliott of the San Antonio Spurs hits the Memorial Day Miracle against the Portland Trail Blazers in the 1999 NBA Playoffs.

=== June ===
- June 1 – American Airlines Flight 1420 overruns the runway in Little Rock, Arkansas, killing 11 people.
- June 8 – The government of Colombia announces it will include the estimated value of the country's illegal drug crops, exceeding half a billion US dollars, in its gross national product.
- June 12 – Texas Governor George W. Bush announces he will seek the Republican Party nomination for President of the United States.
- June 18 – Walt Disney Pictures' 37th feature film, Tarzan, is released to critical praise and box office success. It is the final film to be released during the Disney Renaissance era, which began ten years prior with 1989's The Little Mermaid.
- June 23 – The Phillips explosion of 1999 kills two and injures three in Pasadena, Texas.

=== July ===
- July 2
  - Benjamin Nathaniel Smith begins a three-day killing spree targeting racial and ethnic minorities in Illinois and Indiana, which ends in Smith's suicide.
  - Lawrence Summers is sworn in as the new Secretary of Treasury, succeeding Robert Rubin.
- July 5–6 – U.S. Army Pfc. Barry Winchell is bludgeoned in his sleep at Fort Campbell, Kentucky by fellow soldiers; he dies the next day from his injuries.
- July 8 – A major flash flood in Las Vegas swamps hundreds of cars, smashes mobile homes and kills two people.
- July 10 – U.S. soccer player Brandi Chastain scores the game winning penalty kick against China in the FIFA Women's World Cup.
- July 14 – Big Blue Crane collapses while constructing Miller Park killing three workers.
- July 16 – Off the coast of Martha's Vineyard, a plane piloted by John F. Kennedy Jr. crashes, killing him and his wife, Carolyn Bessette Kennedy, and her sister, Lauren Bessette.
- July 20 – Mercury program: Liberty Bell 7 is raised from the Atlantic Ocean.
- July 22 – The first version of MSN Messenger is released by Microsoft.
- July 23–25 – The Woodstock '99 festival is held in New York.
- July 25 – Lance Armstrong wins his first Tour de France.
- July 26 – The last Checker taxi cab is retired in New York City and auctioned off for approximately $135,000.
- July 29
  - 1999 Atlanta day trading firm shootings: Mark Orrin Barton kills his family. He then goes on a murder spree at the trading firm he worked at, killing a total of 12 people in Atlanta, Georgia. He later committed suicide at a gas station when cornered by police.
  - NASA intentionally crashes the Lunar Prospector spacecraft into the Moon, thus ending its mission to detect frozen water on the lunar surface.

=== August ===
- August 10 – Buford O. Furrow Jr. wounds five and kills one during the Los Angeles Jewish Community Center shooting.
- August 22 – The World Wrestling Federation holds its SummerSlam event from the Target Center in Minneapolis, Minnesota.
- August 30 – Mentally ill Breslover Hasid Gidone Busch is shot dead by four New York City police officers, leading City Councilman Noach Dear to call for an investigation.

=== September ===
- September 7 – Viacom and CBS announce plans to merge.
- September 9 – The Sega Company introduces in American market the new game console with the name Dreamcast.
- September 15 – Larry Gene Ashbrook murders seven people and then commits suicide at Wedgwood Baptist Church in Fort Worth, Texas.
- September 23 – NASA announces that it has lost contact with the Mars Climate Orbiter.
- September 27 – The Detroit Tigers host the Kansas City Royals in the final game at Tiger Stadium.

=== October ===
- October 9 – The last flight of the SR-71.
- October 13 – The United States Senate rejects ratification of the Comprehensive Nuclear-Test-Ban Treaty (CTBT).
- October 16 – The 7.1 M_{w} Hector Mine earthquake shook the Mojave Desert region of Southern California with a maximum Mercalli intensity of VII (Very strong), causing 4–5 injuries and limited damage.
- October 27 – The New York Yankees sweep the Atlanta Braves in the 1999 World Series to win their 25th world championship.
- October 31 – EgyptAir Flight 990, traveling from New York City to Cairo, crashes off the coast of Nantucket, Massachusetts, killing all 217 on board. The NTSB later reports that the co-pilot, Gameel Al-Batouti, deliberately crashed the plane, however, Egyptian authorities dispute this claim.

=== November ===
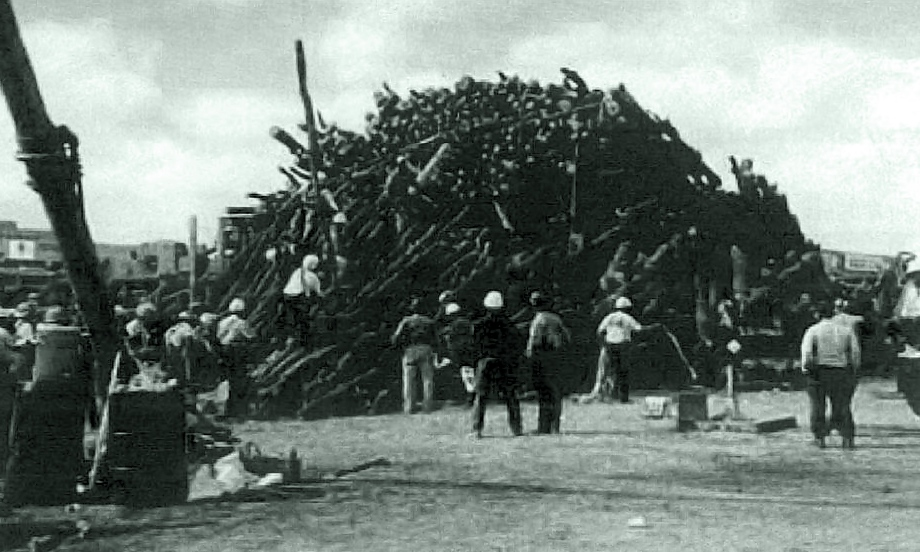
November 18: Aggie Bonfire collapse

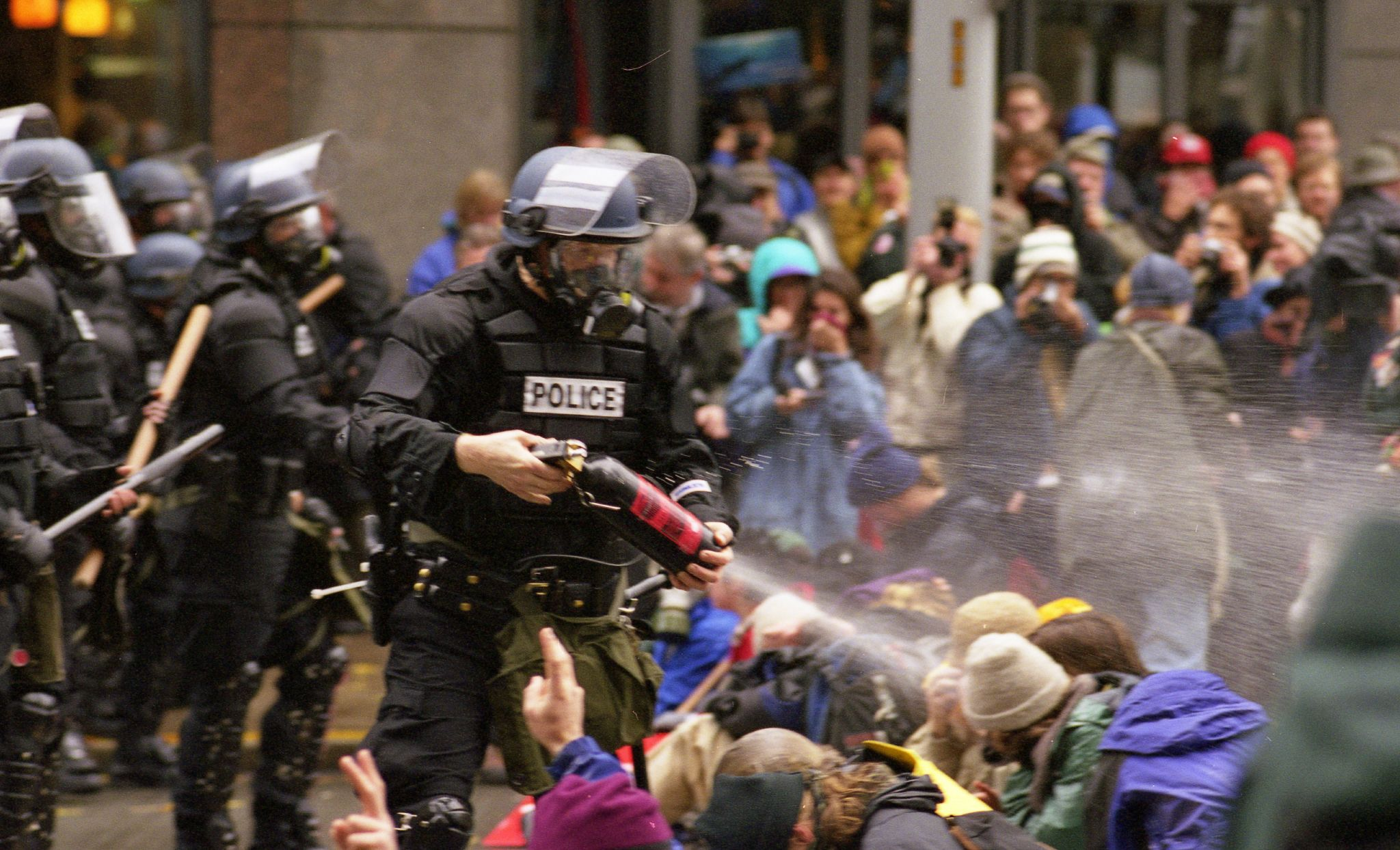
November 30: WTO protests in Seattle

- November 2 – Byran Uyesugi kills seven people at a Xerox building in Honolulu, Hawaii.
- November 13 – The infamous Mexia Supermarket was discovered to have rotting food inside the building 60 to 90 days after closure.
- November 18 – The Aggie Bonfire collapses in College Station, Texas, killing 12.
- November 24 – Disney/Pixar's third feature film, Toy Story 2, the sequel to 1995's Toy Story, is released in theaters.
- November 30
  - 1999 Seattle WTO protests: In Seattle, Washington, protests against the WTO meeting by anti-globalization protesters catch police unprepared and force the cancellation of opening ceremonies.
  - The ExxonMobil merger is completed, forming the largest corporation in the world at that time.

=== December ===
- December – The unemployment rate drops to 4%, the lowest level since January 1970.
- December 3 – NASA loses radio contact with the Mars Polar Lander, moments before the spacecraft enters the Martian atmosphere.
- December 7 – The Recording Industry Association of America files a lawsuit against the Napster file-sharing client, alleging copyright infringement.
- December 16 – Walt Disney Pictures' 38th feature film, Fantasia 2000, a sequel to 1940's Fantasia, premieres at Carnegie Hall, with an IMAX release on New Years Day 2000 and a general theatrical release later in June.
- December 18 – NASA launches into orbit the Terra platform, carrying 5 Earth Observation instruments, including ASTER, CERES, MISR, MODIS and MOPITT.
- December 31 – The U.S. turns over complete administration of the Panama Canal to the Panamanian government, as stipulated in the Torrijos–Carter Treaties of 1977.

=== Ongoing ===
- Iraqi no-fly zones (1991–2003)
- Dot-com bubble (c. 1995–c. 2000)
- Lewinsky scandal (1998–1999)

== Births ==
=== January ===
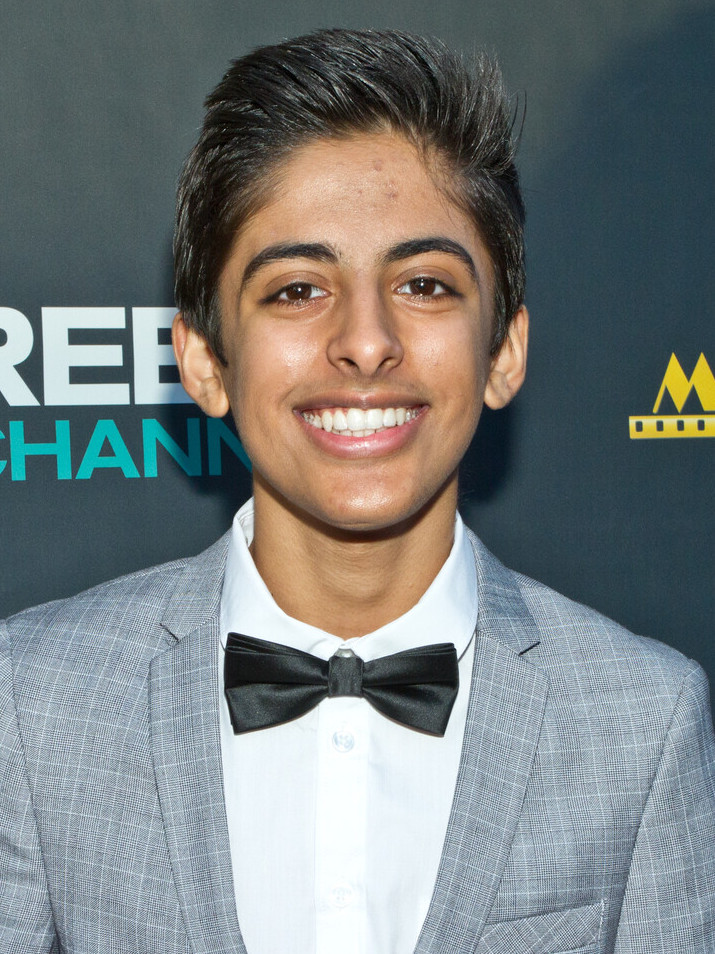
Karan Brar

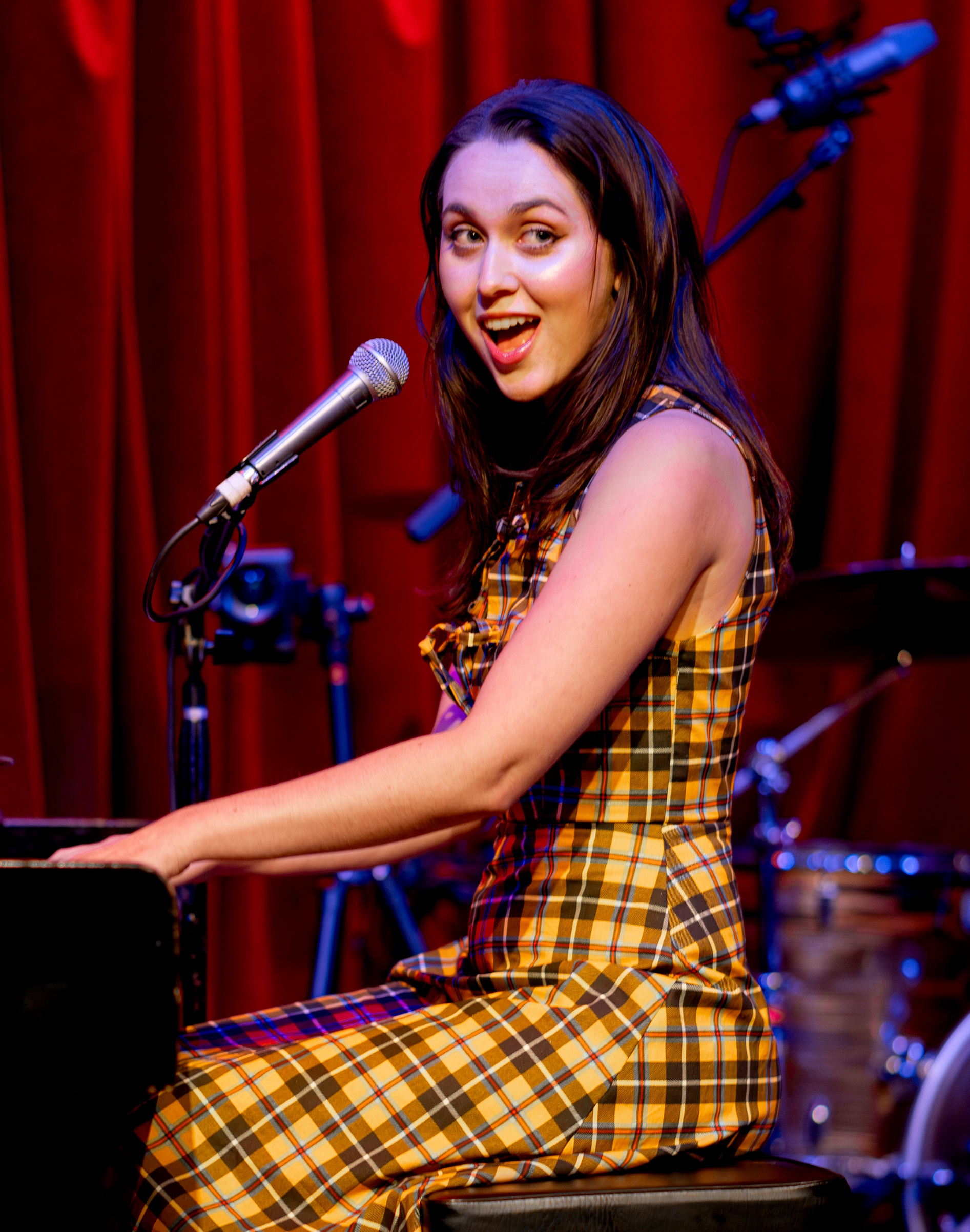
Em Beihold

- January 1
  - Trenton Gill, American football player
  - Diamond White, singer and actress
- January 5
  - Miguel Morales, rapper
  - Marc Yu, musician
- January 6 – Polo G, rapper
- January 7 – Cayla Barnes, ice hockey player
- January 13
  - Nicholas Art, actor
  - Conor McDermott-Mostowy, Olympic speed skater
- January 14 – Zach Hsieh, YouTuber
- January 18
  - Karan Brar, actor
  - Tee Higgins, American football player
  - Mateus Ward, actor
- January 19 – Jonathan Taylor, football player
- January 20 – Shannon Tavarez, actress (d. 2010)
- January 21 – Em Beihold, singer/songwriter
- January 22 – Ravyn Lenae, singer
- January 23 – Madi Davis, singer
- January 28
  - Dobre Twins, YouTubers
  - Preston Strother, actor

=== February ===
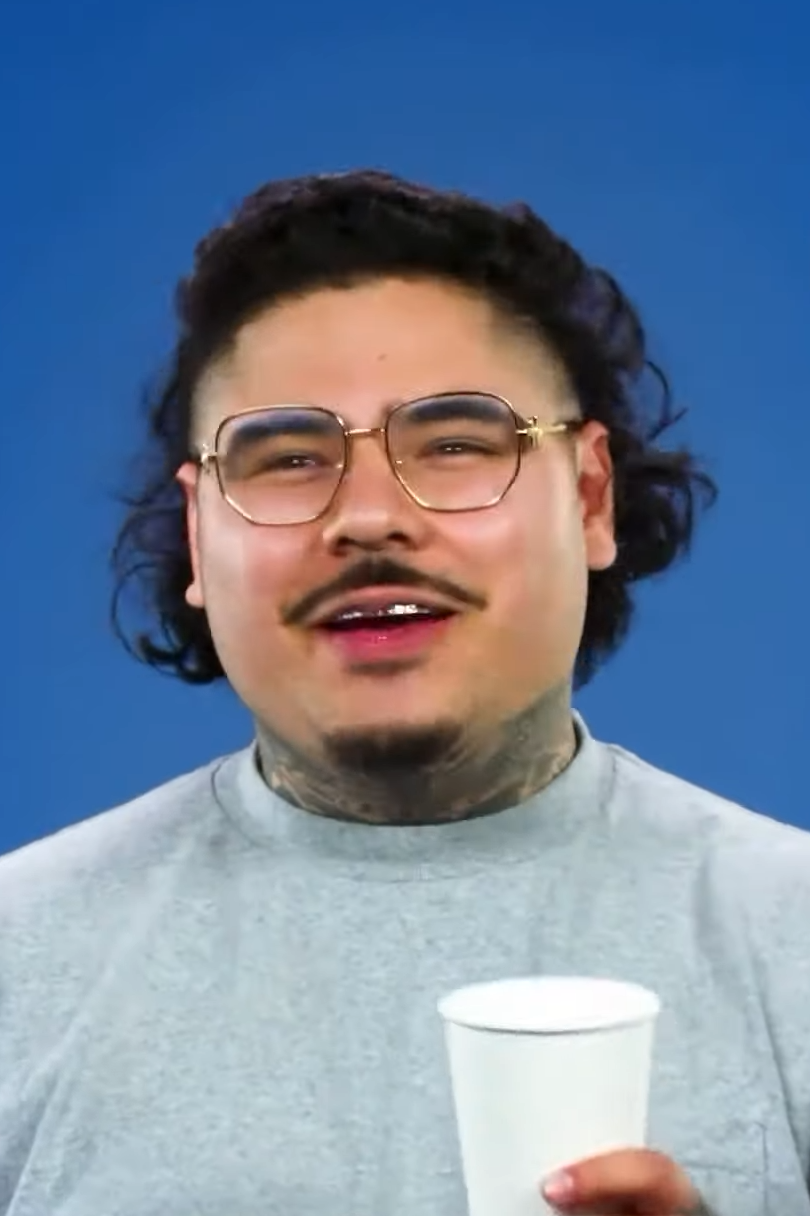
That Mexican OT

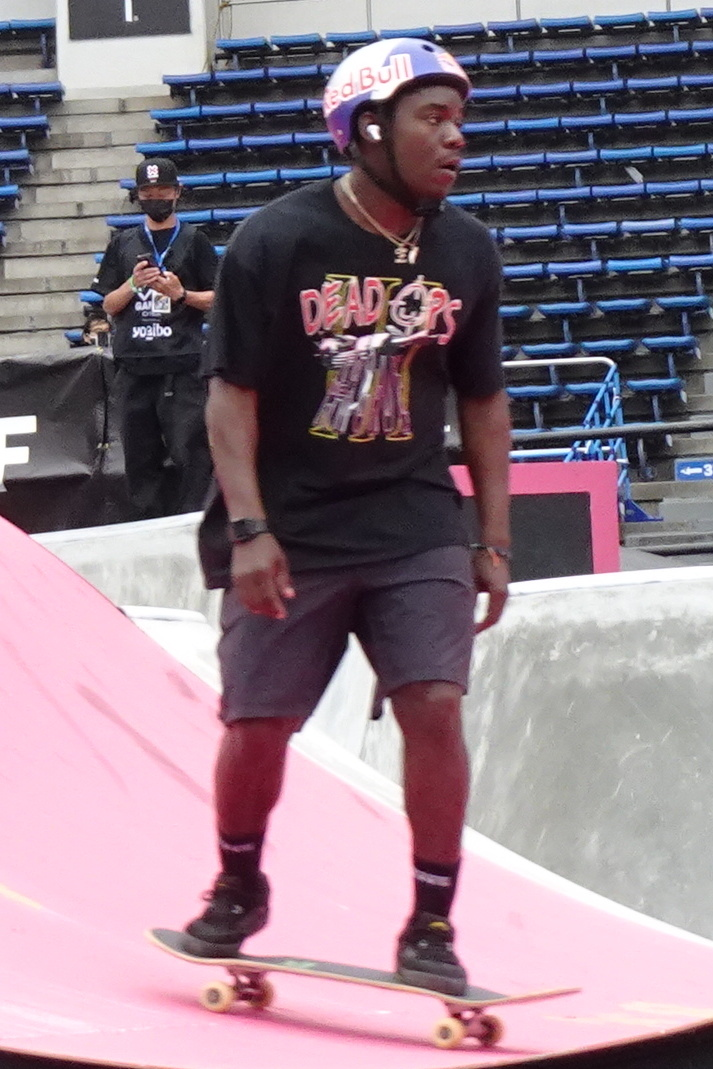
Zion Wright

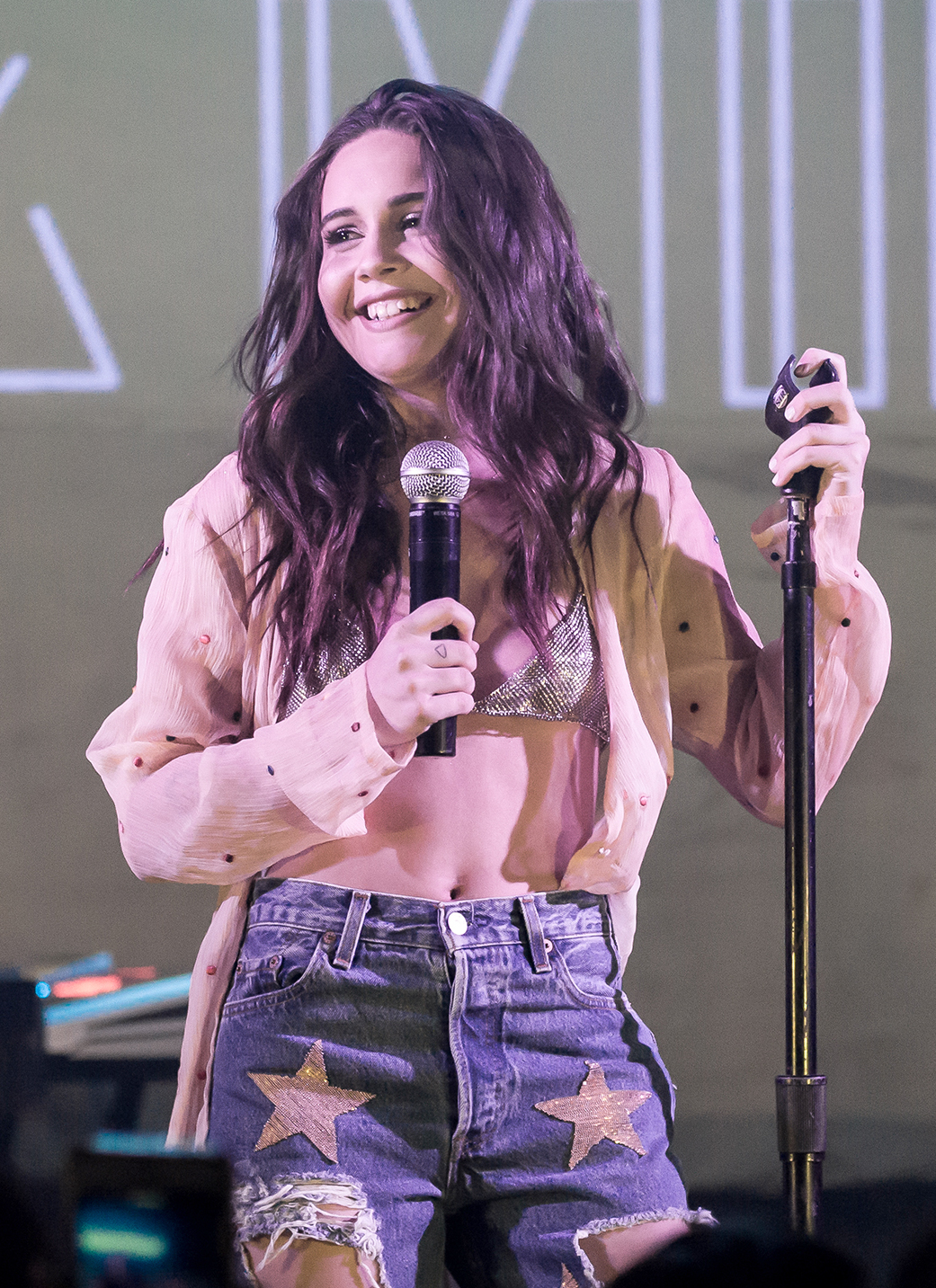
Bea Miller

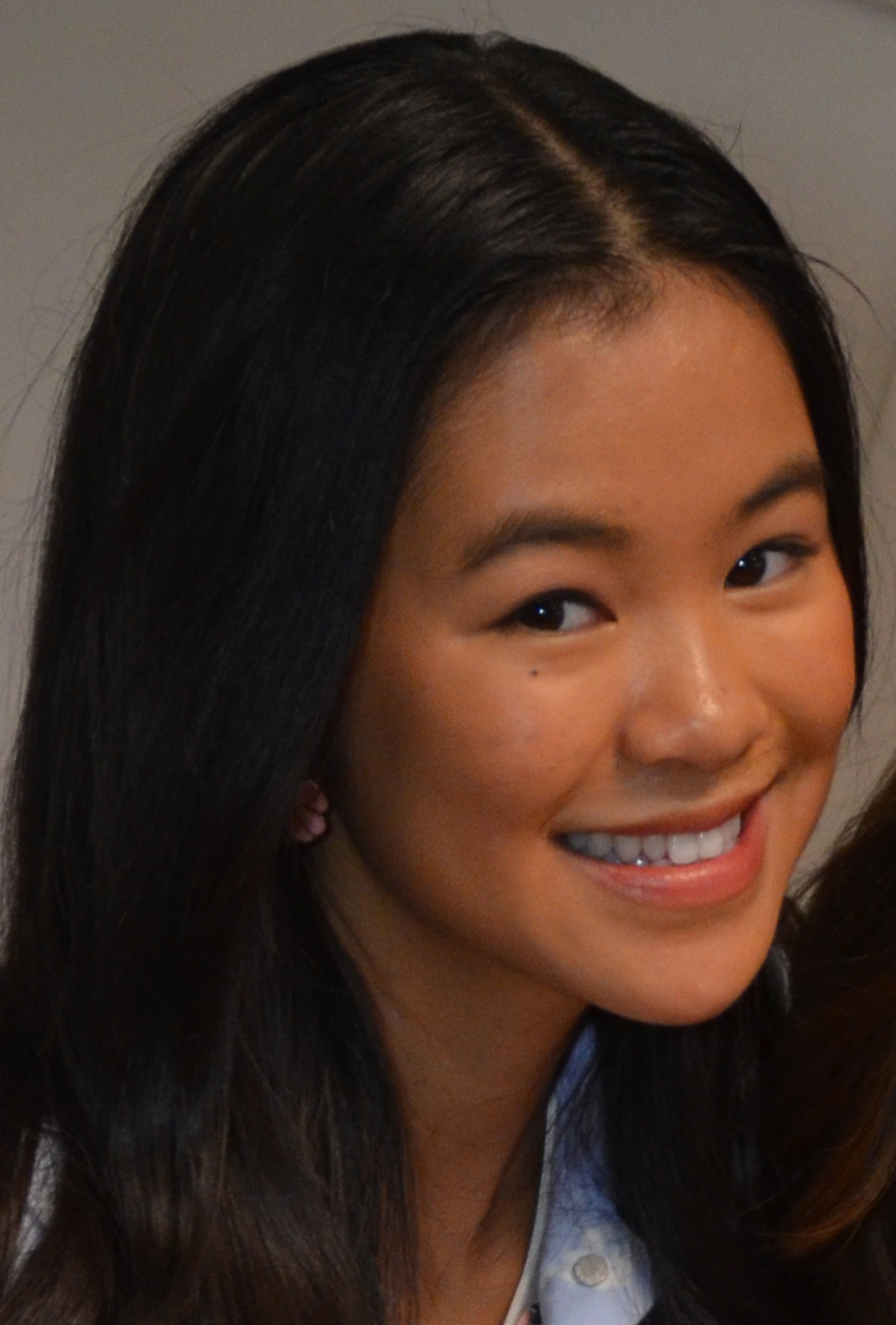
Tiffany Espensen

- February 1 – Lola Forsberg, actress
- February 2 – That Mexican OT, rapper
- February 3 – Zion Wright, skateboarder
- February 7 – Bea Miller, singer-songwriter and actress
- February 10 – Tiffany Espensen, Chinese-born actress
- February 11 – Candace Hill, athlete
- February 14 – Tyler Adams, soccer player
- February 18 – Lorraine McNamara, ice dancer
- February 19
  - Joseph Ryan Harrington, actor and dancer
  - Jackson Pace, actor

=== March ===
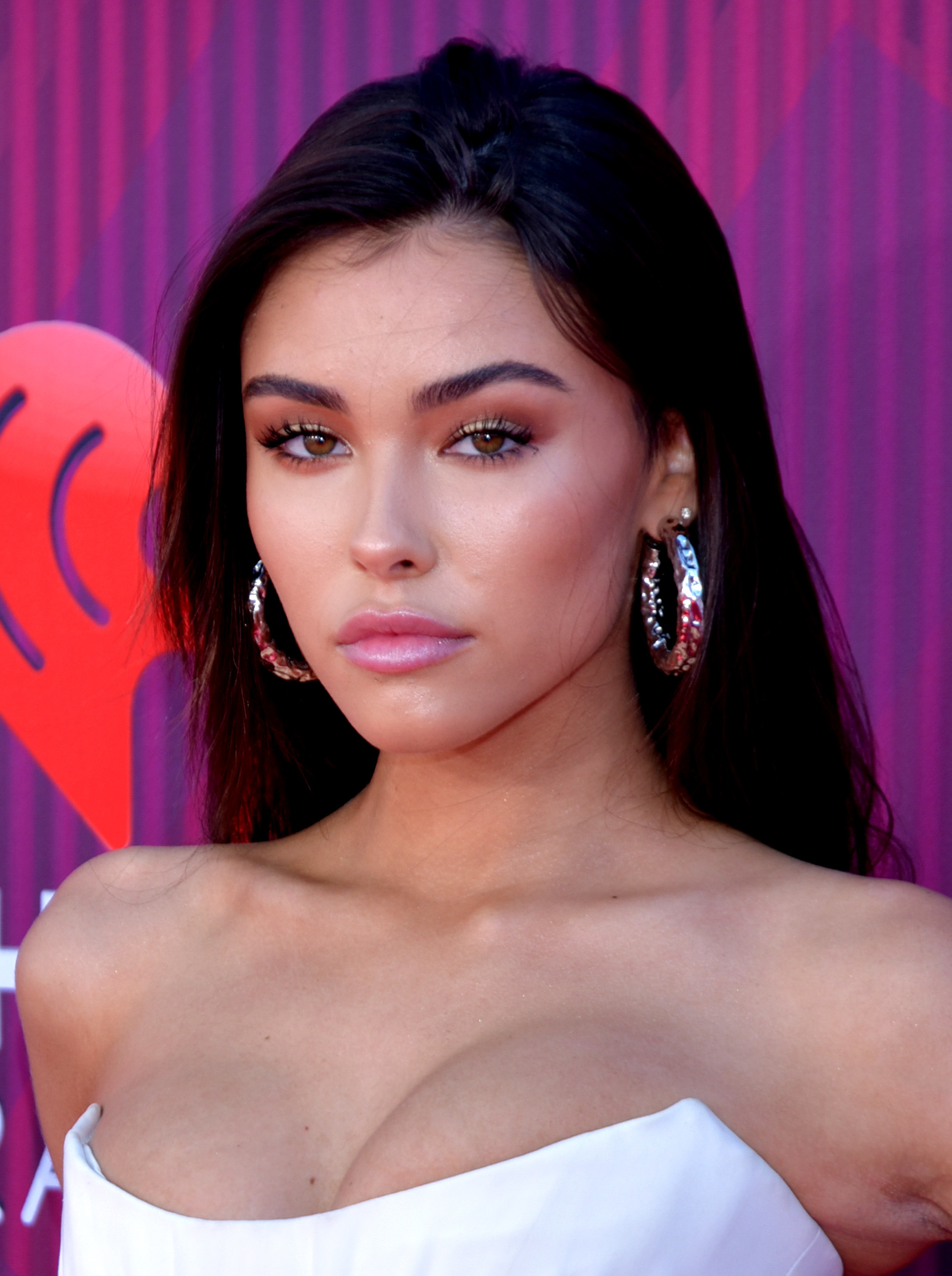
Madison Beer

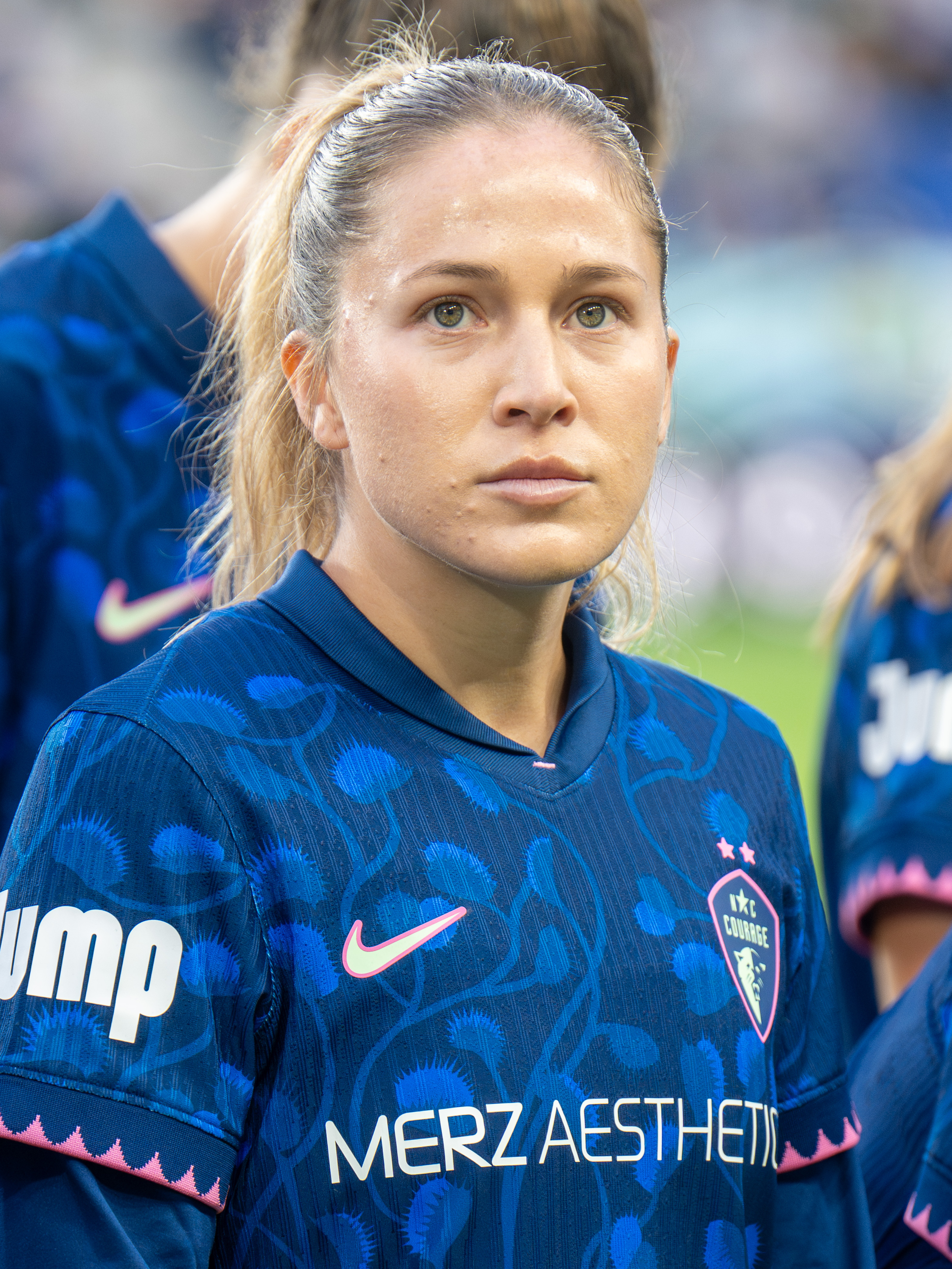
Ashley Sanchez

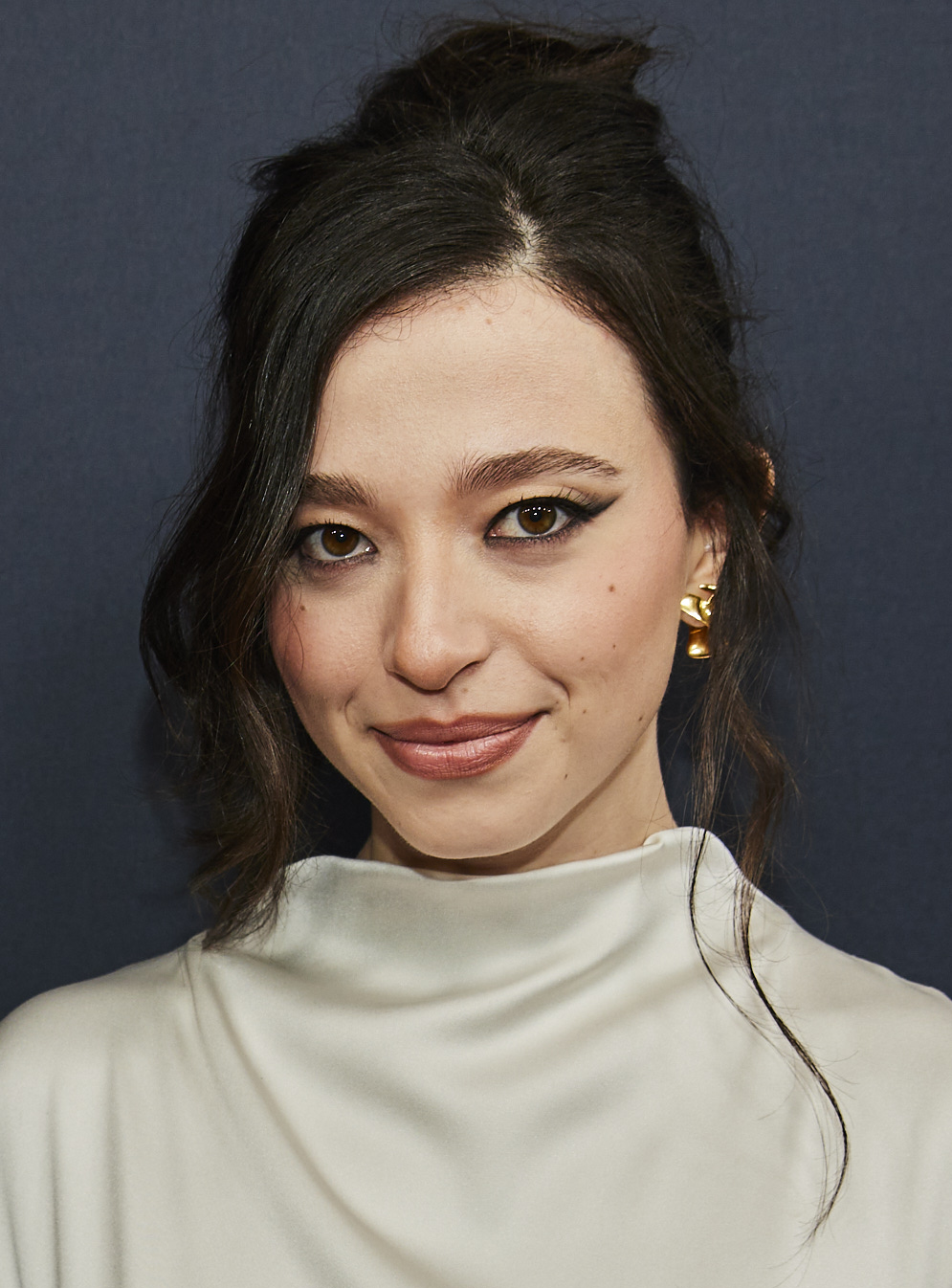
Mikey Madison

- March 2 – Caleb Lee Hutchinson, singer
- March 5
  - Justin Fields, football player
  - Madison Beer, singer
  - Colin Schooler, football player
- March 8 – Luc Violette, Olympic curler
- March 16
  - Ashley Farquharson, Olympic luger
  - Ashley Sanchez, soccer player
  - Bailie Key, artistic gymnast
- March 19 – Gabby Petito, murder victim (d. 2021)
- March 22 – Gavin MacIntosh, actor
- March 23 – Quando Rondo, rapper
- March 25
  - Iann Dior, rapper
  - Mikey Madison, actress
- March 26
  - Scarlett Stitt, actress
  - Quinn Sullivan, songwriter and musician
- March 28 – Megan Suri, actress
- March 31 – Sawyer Fredericks, singer/songwriter

=== April ===
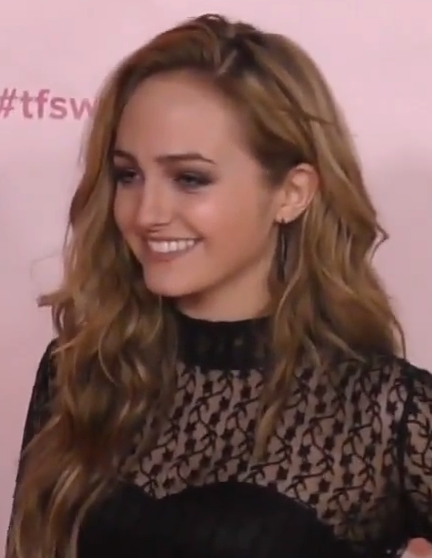
Sophie Reynolds

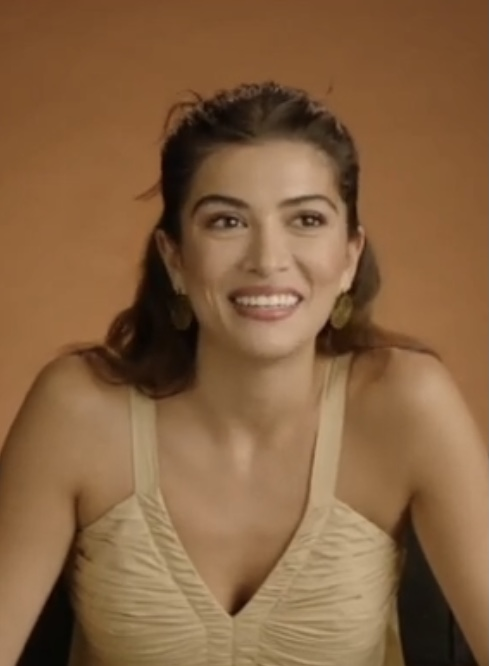
Lisette Olivera

- April 2 – Sophie Reynolds, actress
- April 4 – Keely Cashman, Olympic Alpine ski racer
- April 6 – Kwesi Boakye, actor
- April 8 – Ty Panitz, actor
- April 9 – Lil Nas X, rapper and singer/songwriter
- April 16 – Lisette Olivera, actress
- April 18 – Mallory Beach, notable victim (d. 2019)
- April 20 – Carly Rose Sonenclar, actress and singer/songwriter
- April 23
  - Claud, singer/songwriter
  - Grace Zumwinkle, ice hockey player
- April 29 – Morgan Turner, actress

=== May ===
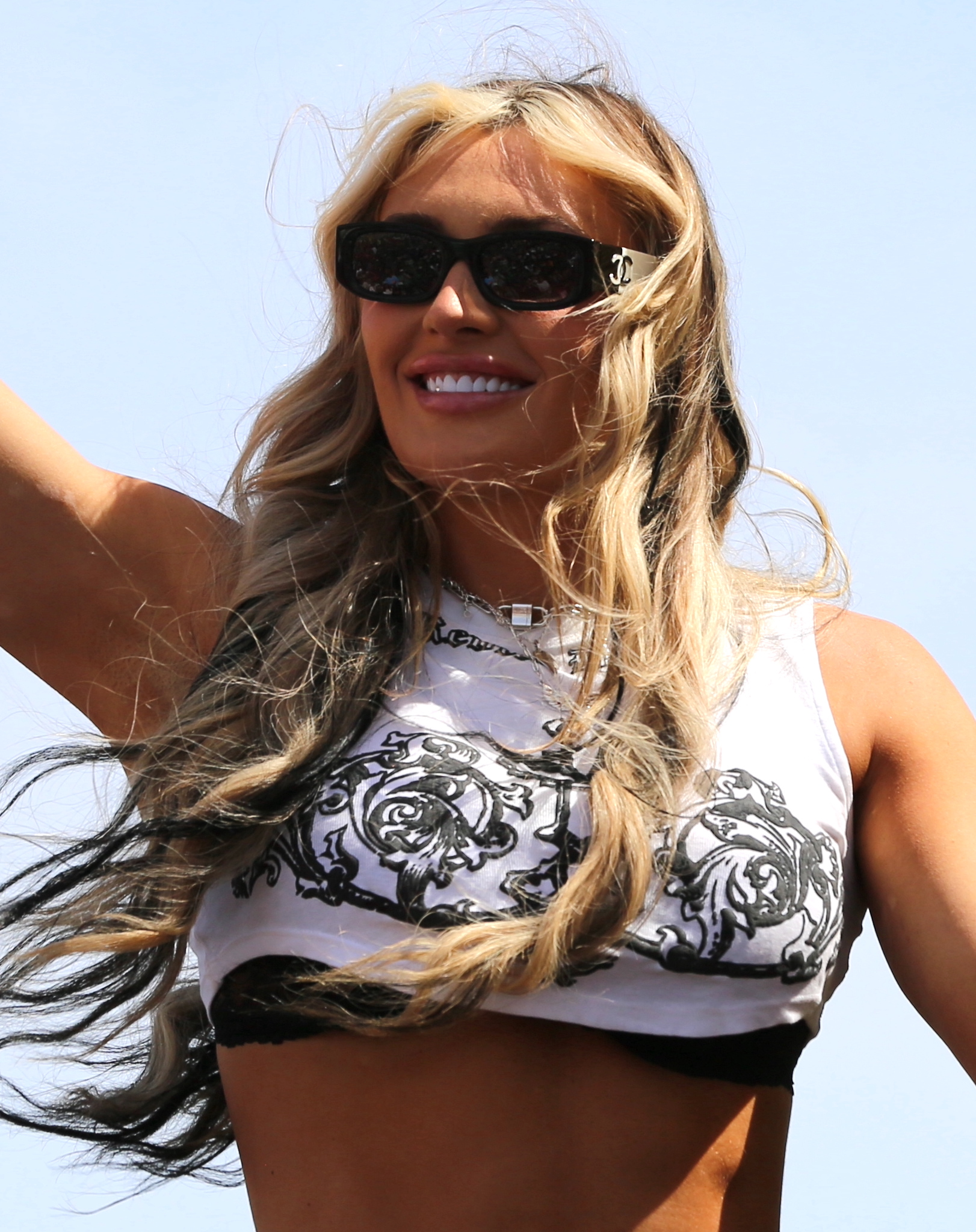
Tiffany Stratton

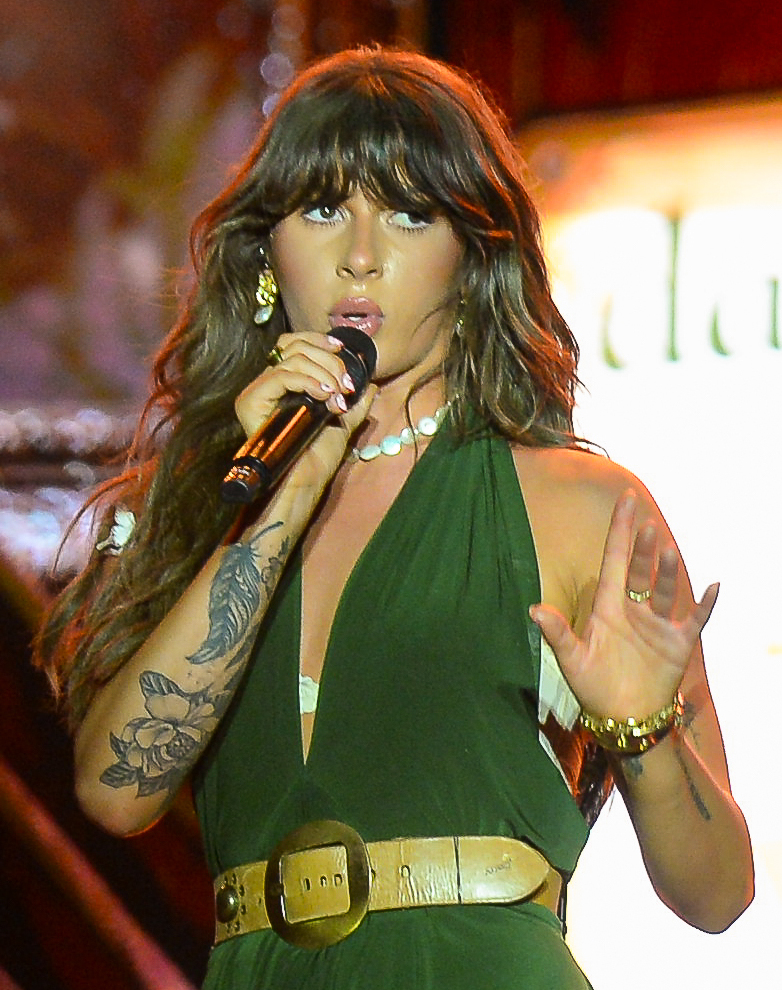
Ella Langley

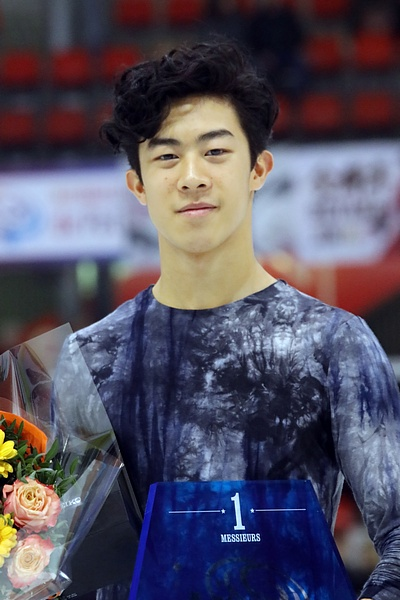
Nathan Chen

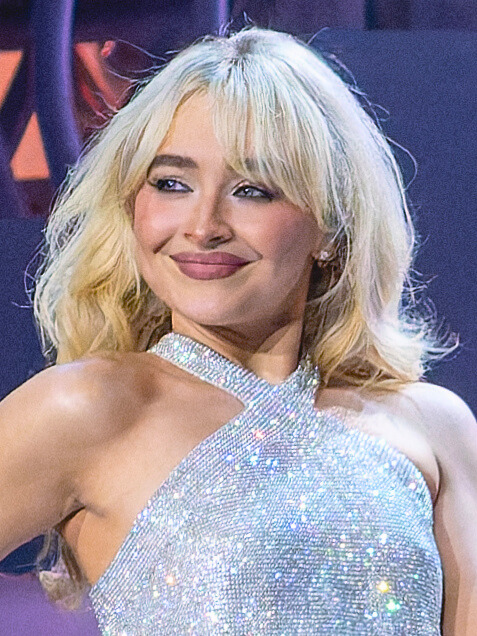
Sabrina Carpenter

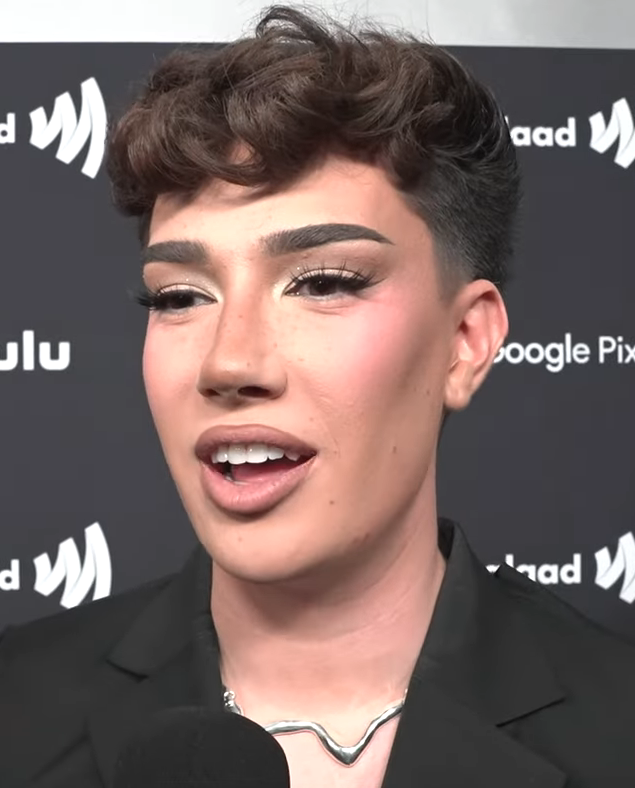
James Charles

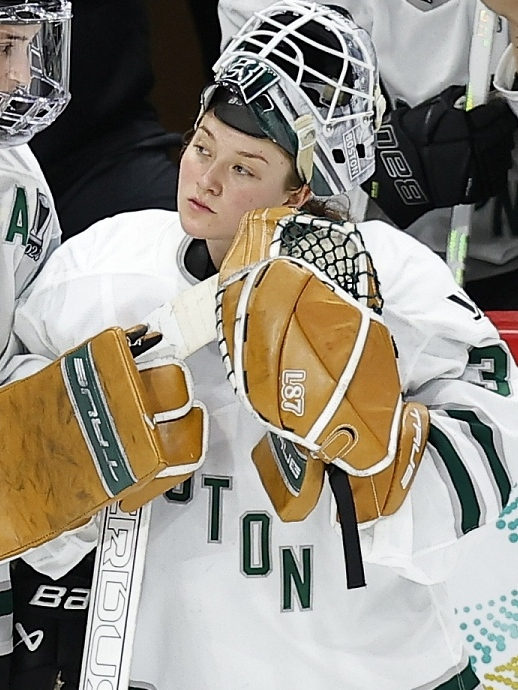
Aerin Frankel

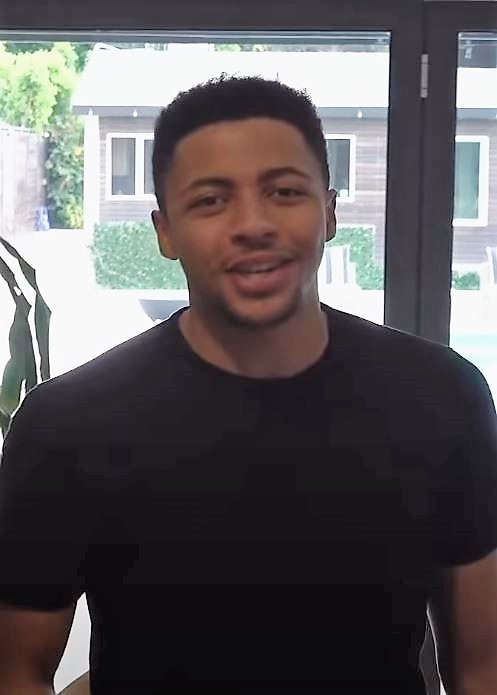
Ali Kabbani

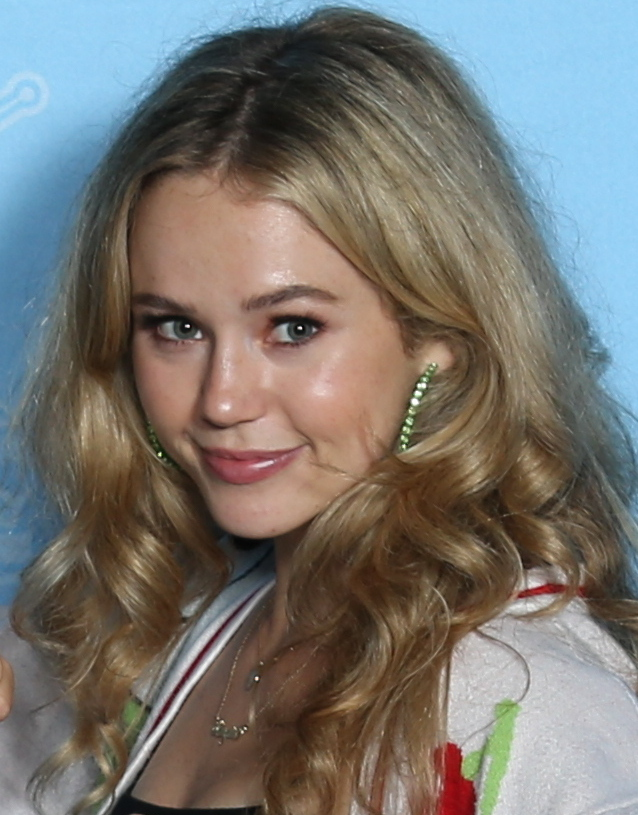
Brec Bassinger

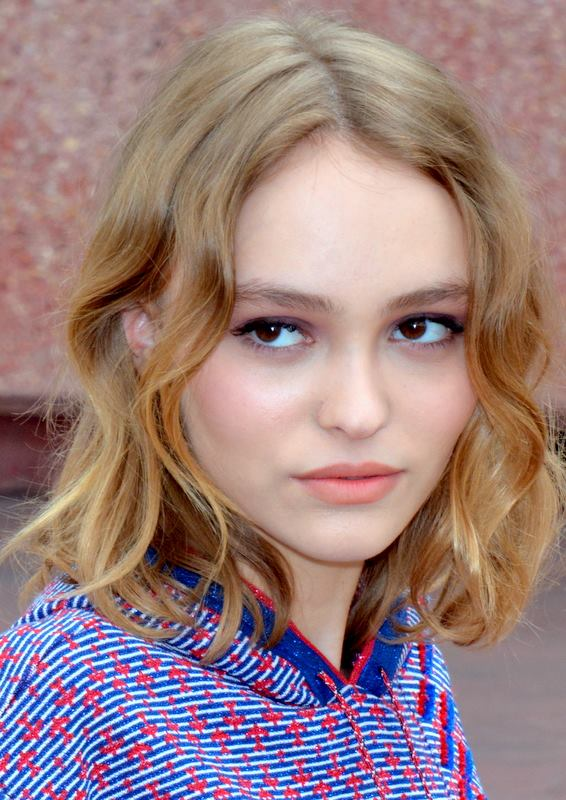
Lily-Rose Depp

- May 1
  - YNW Melly, American rapper
  - Tiffany Stratton, professional wrestler
- May 3
  - Ella Langley, country singer
  - Rory Staunton, notable victim (d. 2012)
- May 4 – Tyler Senerchia, wrestler
- May 5
  - Nathan Chen, figure skater
  - Bobby Coleman, actor
- May 7 – Anna Gibson, Olympic skier
- May 10 – Michael Gandolfini, actor
- May 11
  - Sabrina Carpenter, actress
  - Madison Lintz, actress
  - Zach Stoppelmoor, Olympic speed skater
- May 18 – Teo Halm, actor
- May 22 – Camren Bicondova, actress
- May 23
  - Trinidad Cardona, musician
  - James Charles, makeup artist
- May 24
  - Aerin Frankel, ice hockey player
  - Charlie Plummer, actor
  - Ali Kabbani, gamer better known as Myth
  - Anthony Quintal, internet personality
- May 25 – Brec Bassinger, actress
- May 26 – Elle Chapman, actress
- May 27 – Lily-Rose Depp, actress and model
- May 28 – Cameron Boyce, actor (d. 2019)
- May 29 – Ella Emhoff, fashion designer
- May 30 – Sean Giambrone, actor and voice actor
- May 31 – Emily Evan Rae, actress

=== June ===
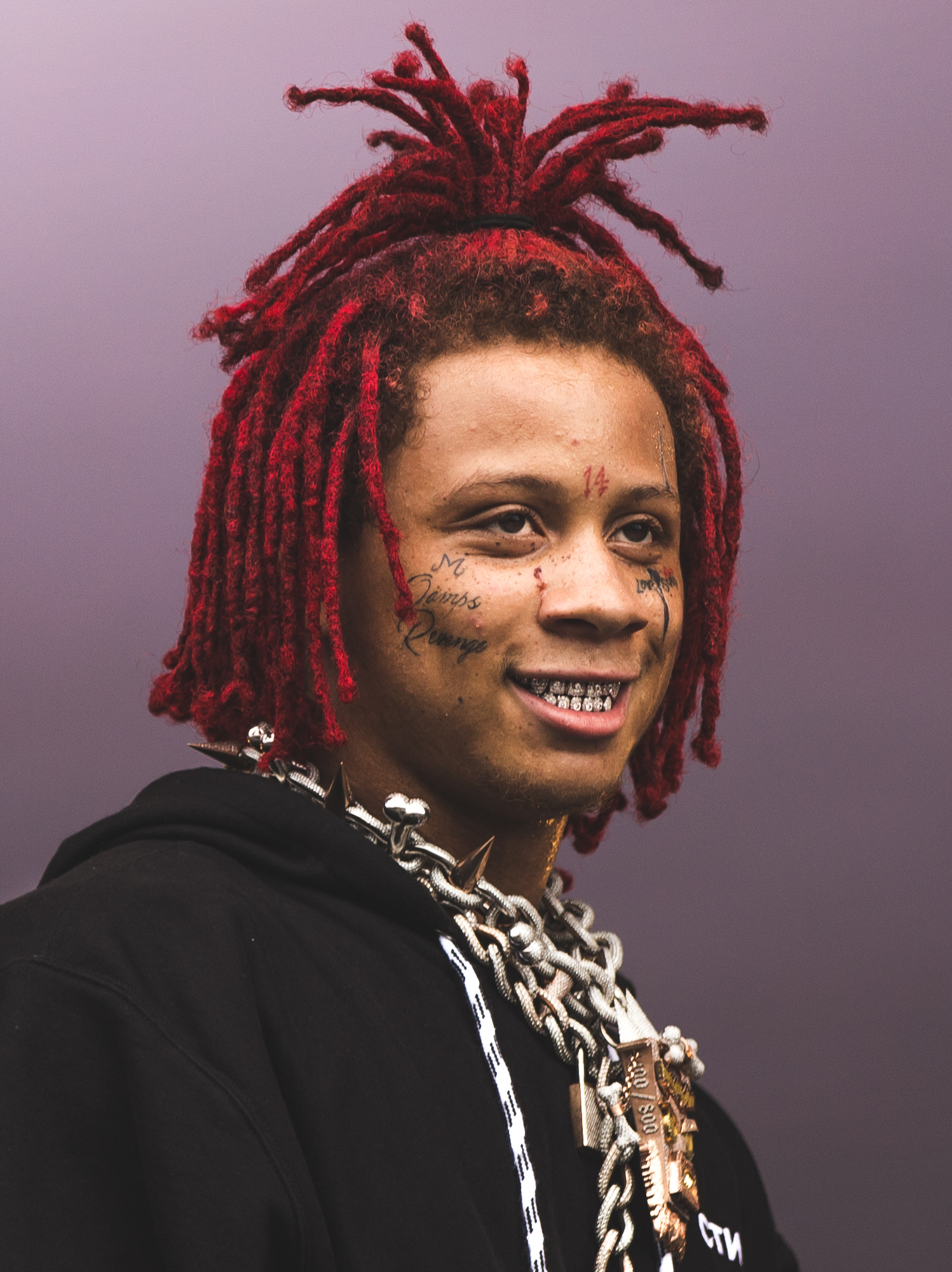
Trippie Redd

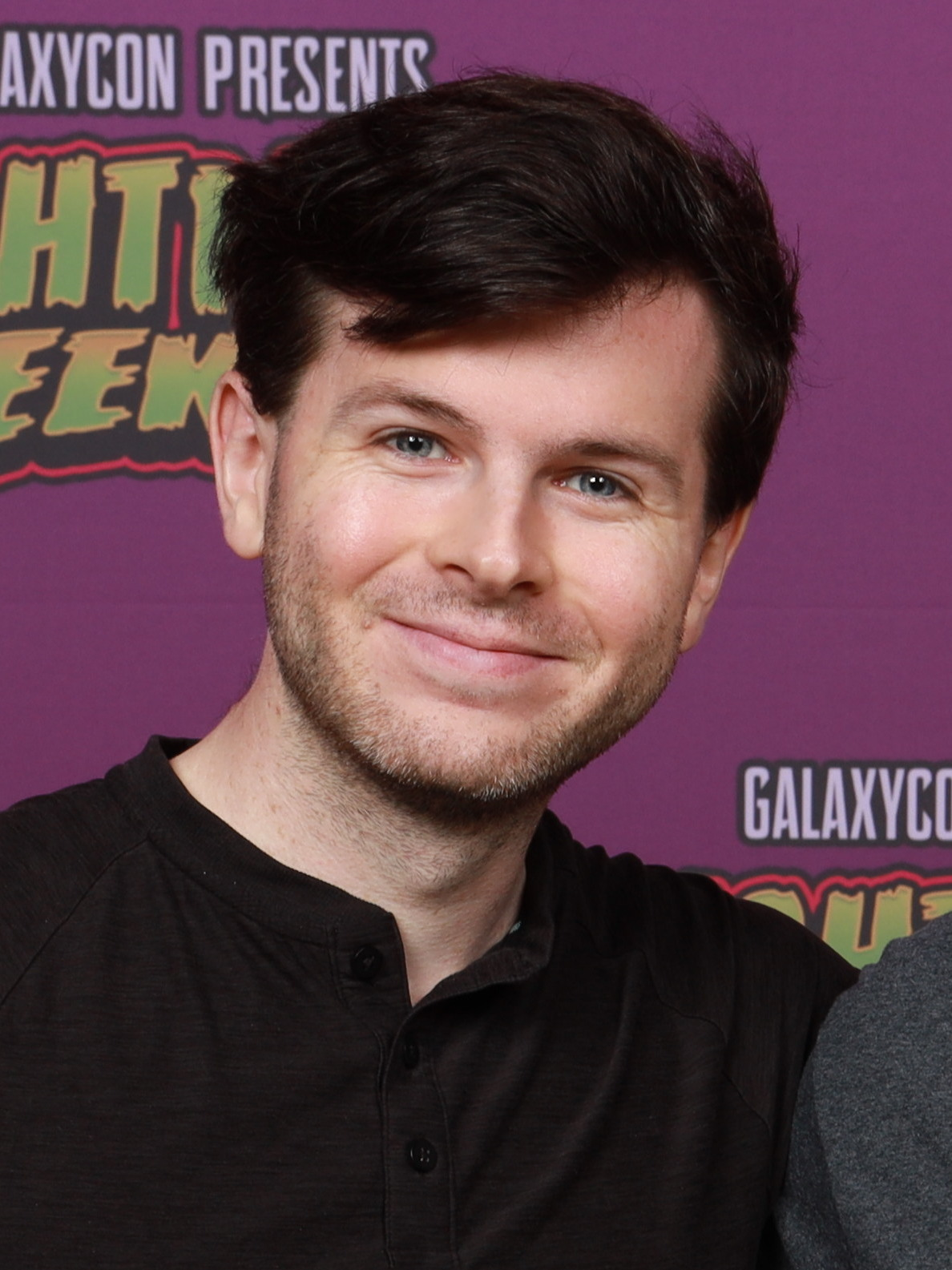
Chandler Riggs

- June 1 – Technoblade, internet personality (d. 2022)
- June 2 – Madison Leisle, actress
- June 9 – Zane Smith, stock car racing driver
- June 11
  - Katelyn Nacon, actress
  - Saxon Sharbino, actress
- June 13 – Alexis Roland, snowboarder
- June 17 – Frances Forever, singer/songwriter
- June 18
  - Trippie Redd, rapper
  - Willie Spence, singer (d. 2022)
- June 20
  - Cory Juneau, skateboarder
  - Kayla Maisonet, actress
- June 22 – Cam Akers, football player
- June 26 – Harley Quinn Smith, actress
- June 27 – Chandler Riggs, actor

=== July ===
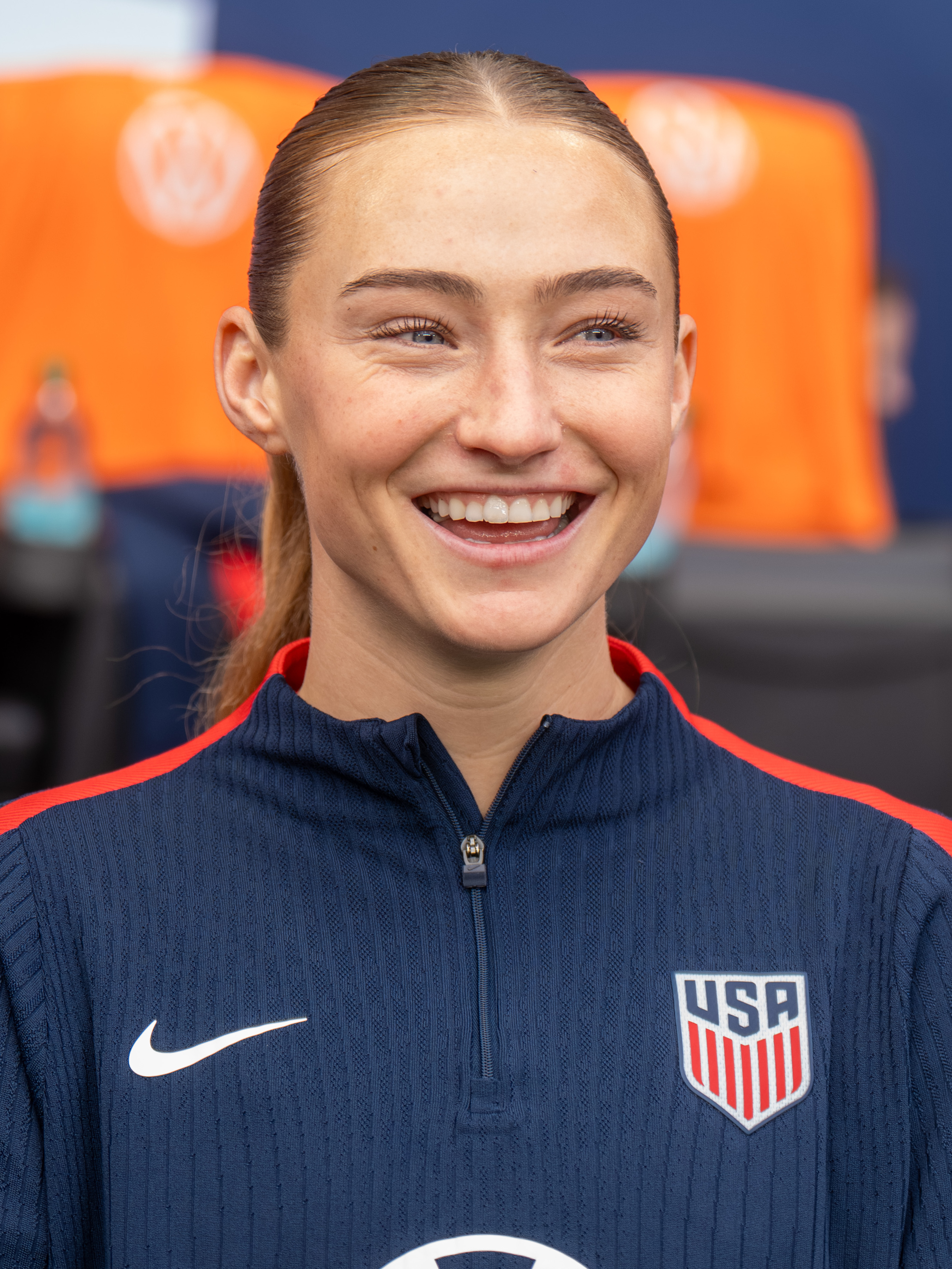
Tara Rudd

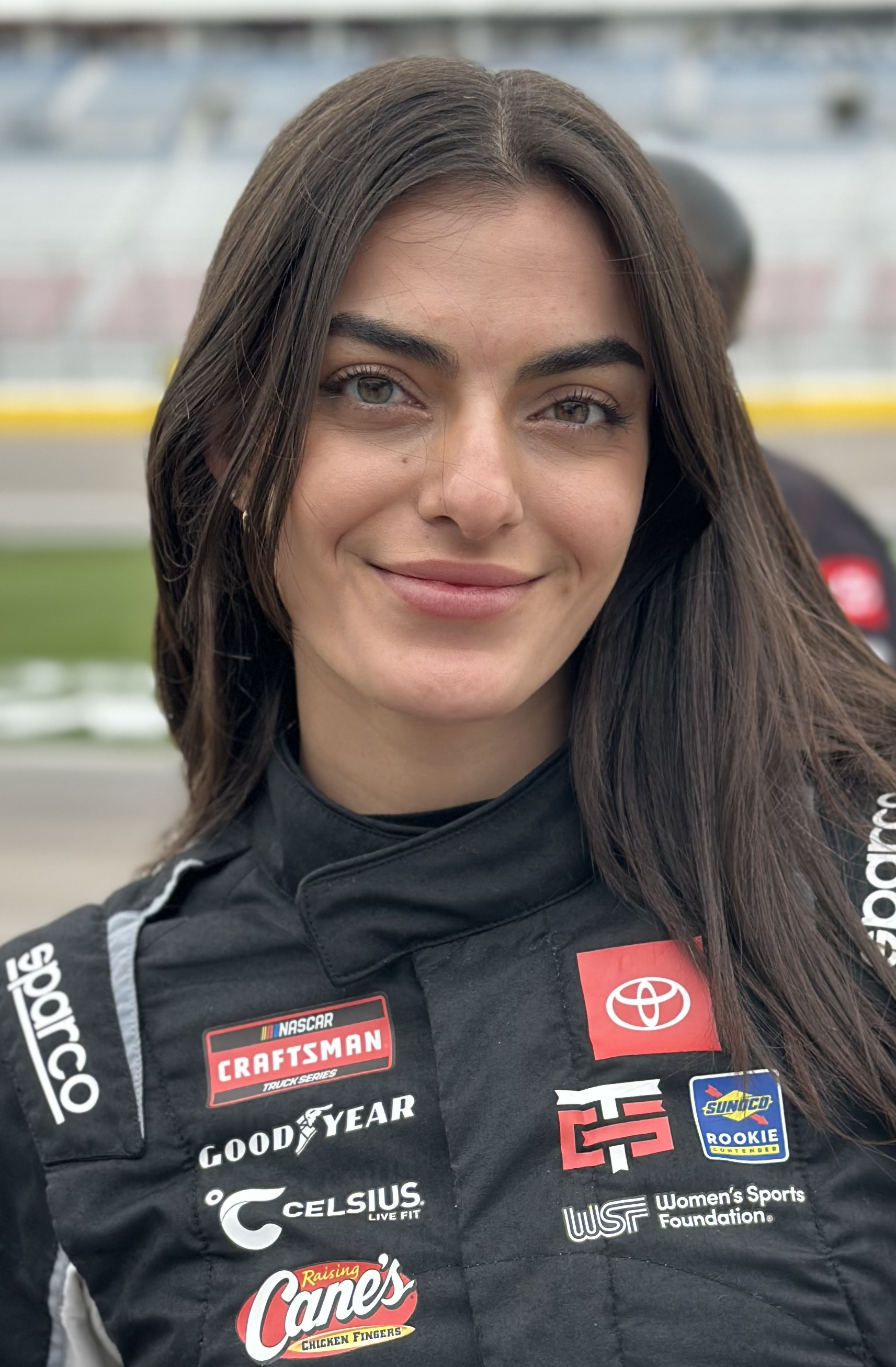
Toni Breidinger

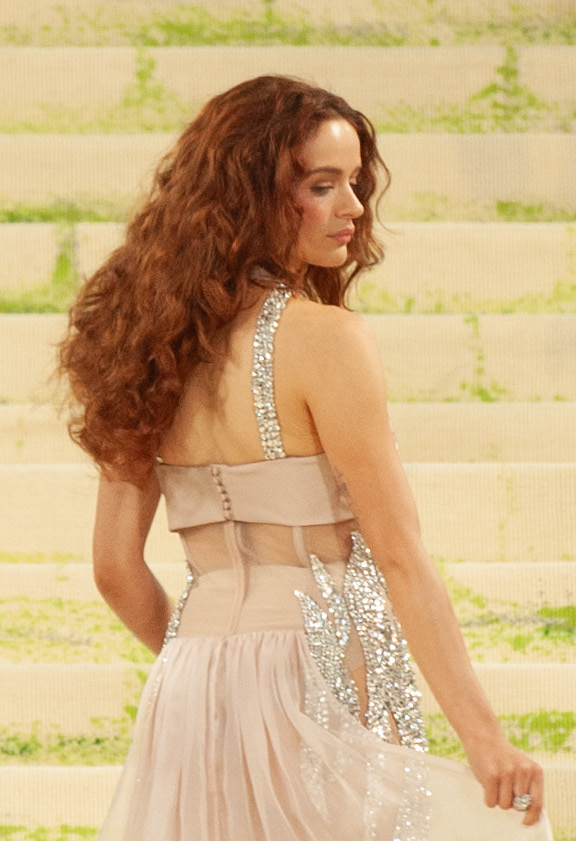
Joey King

- Julu 2 – Tara Rudd, soccer player
- July 14
  - Toni Breidinger, professional race car driver
  - Camryn Magness, singer
- July 20 – Pop Smoke, rapper (d. 2020)
- July 26 – Birk Irving, Olympic freestyle skier
- July 28
  - GloRilla, rapper
  - Troy Brown Jr., basketball player
- July 30 – Joey King, actress

=== August ===
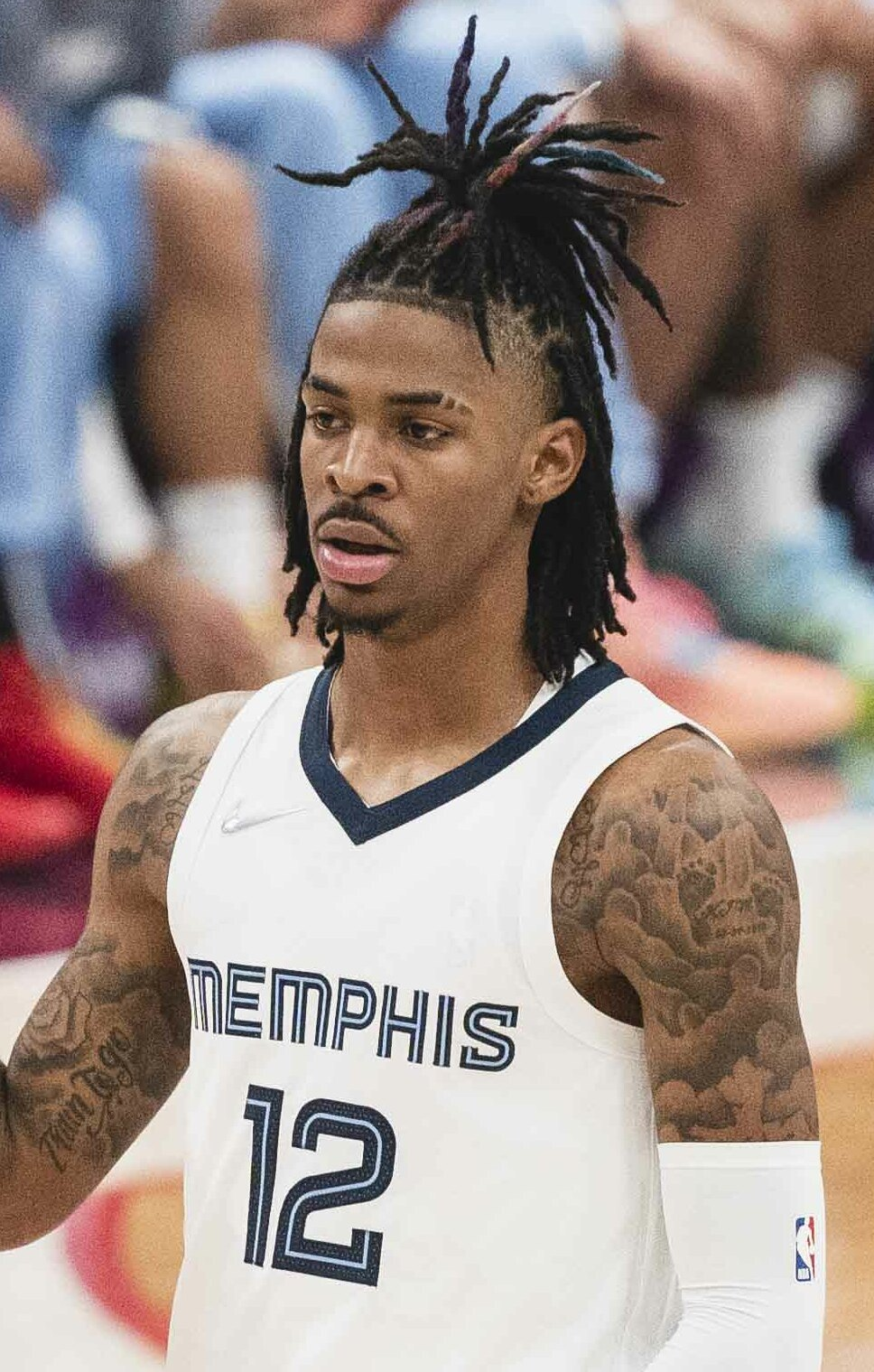
Ja Morant

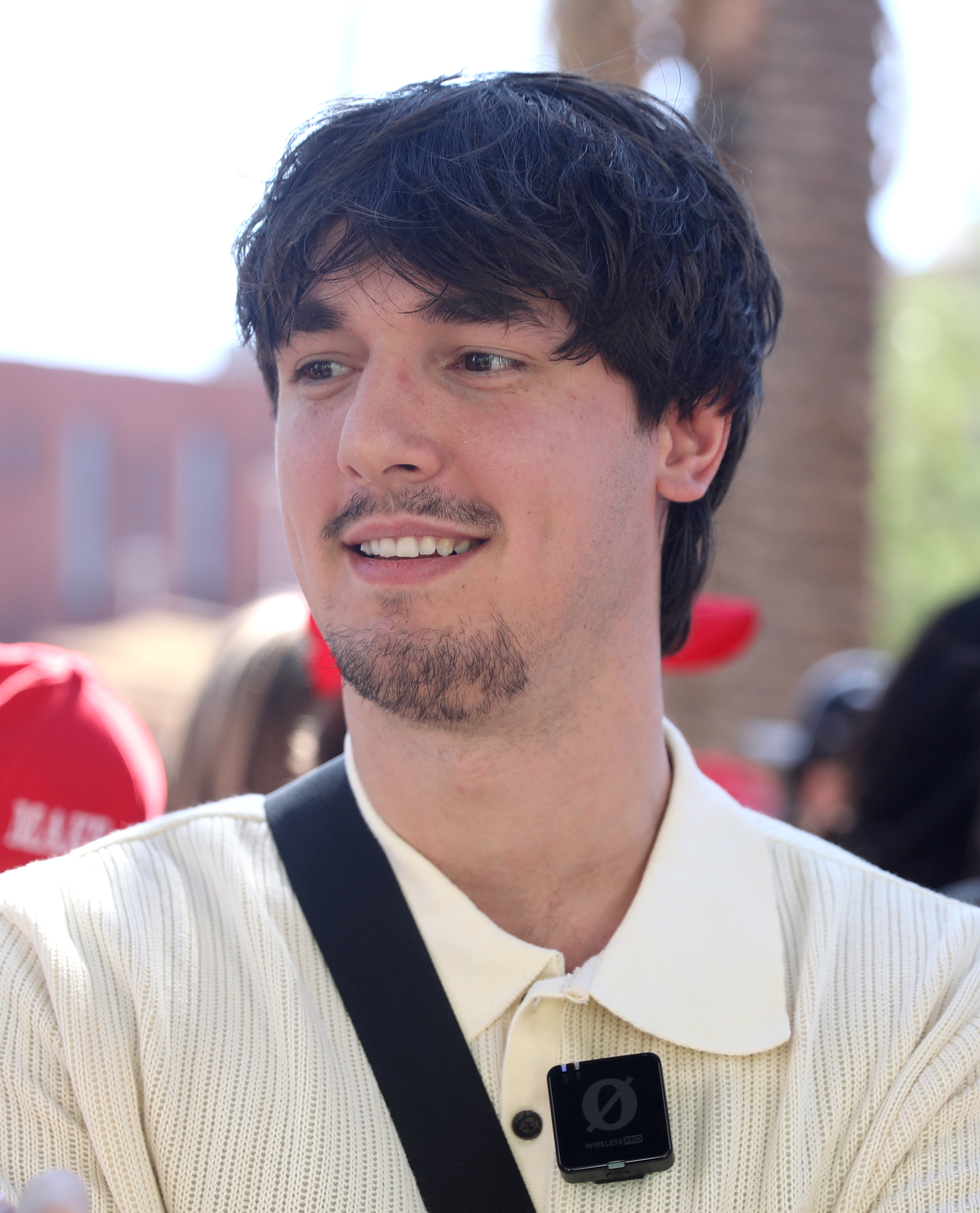
Bryce Hall

- August 4 – Kelly Gould, actress
- August 7 – Sydney McLaughlin-Levrone, hurdler and sprinter, Olympic champion (2020)
- August 9 – Ariana Guido, actress
- August 10 – Ja Morant, basketball player
- August 11 – Khyree Jackson, football player (d. 2024)
- August 12 – Dream, Minecraft-themed YouTuber
- August 13 – Eli Brown, actor
- August 14
  - Bryce Hall, social media influencer
  - Alison Thornton, actress
- August 16 – Karen Chen, figure skater
- August 19
  - Ethan Cutkosky, actor
  - Salem Ilese, musician
  - Tristan Lake Leabu, actor
- August 21 – Maxim Knight, actor
- August 22 – Ricardo Hurtado, actor and singer
- August 25 – Sophie Cates, singer/songwriter
- August 26 – Sol Ruca, wrestler

=== September ===
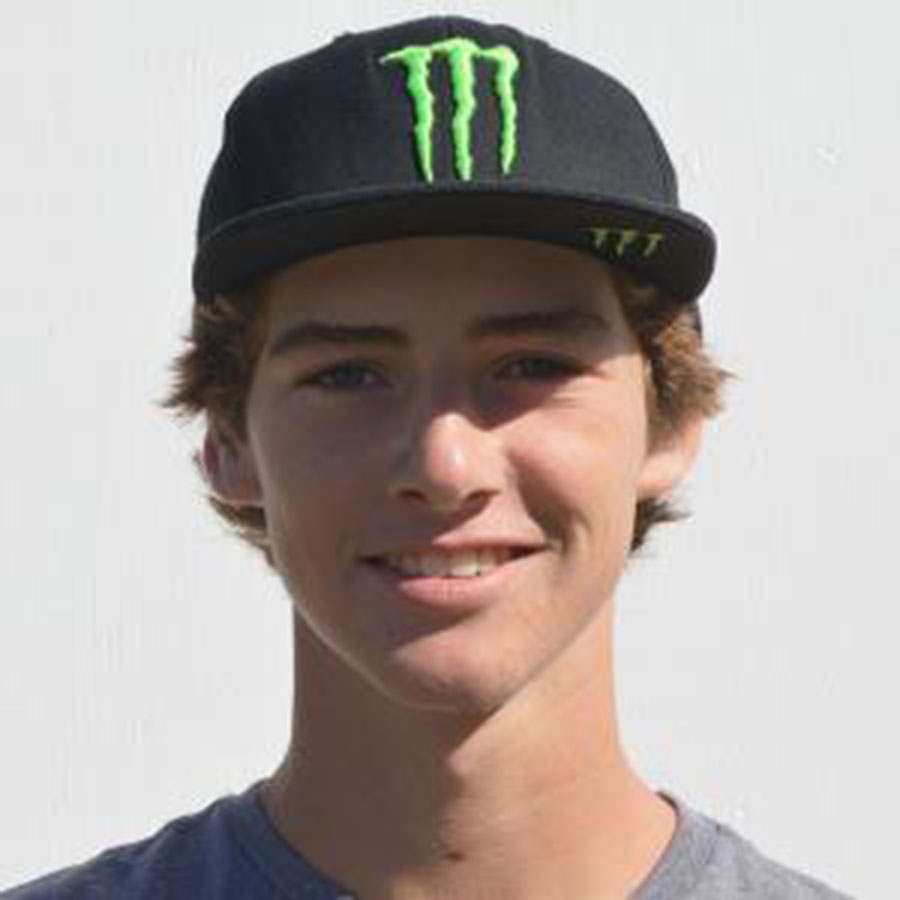
Tom Schaar

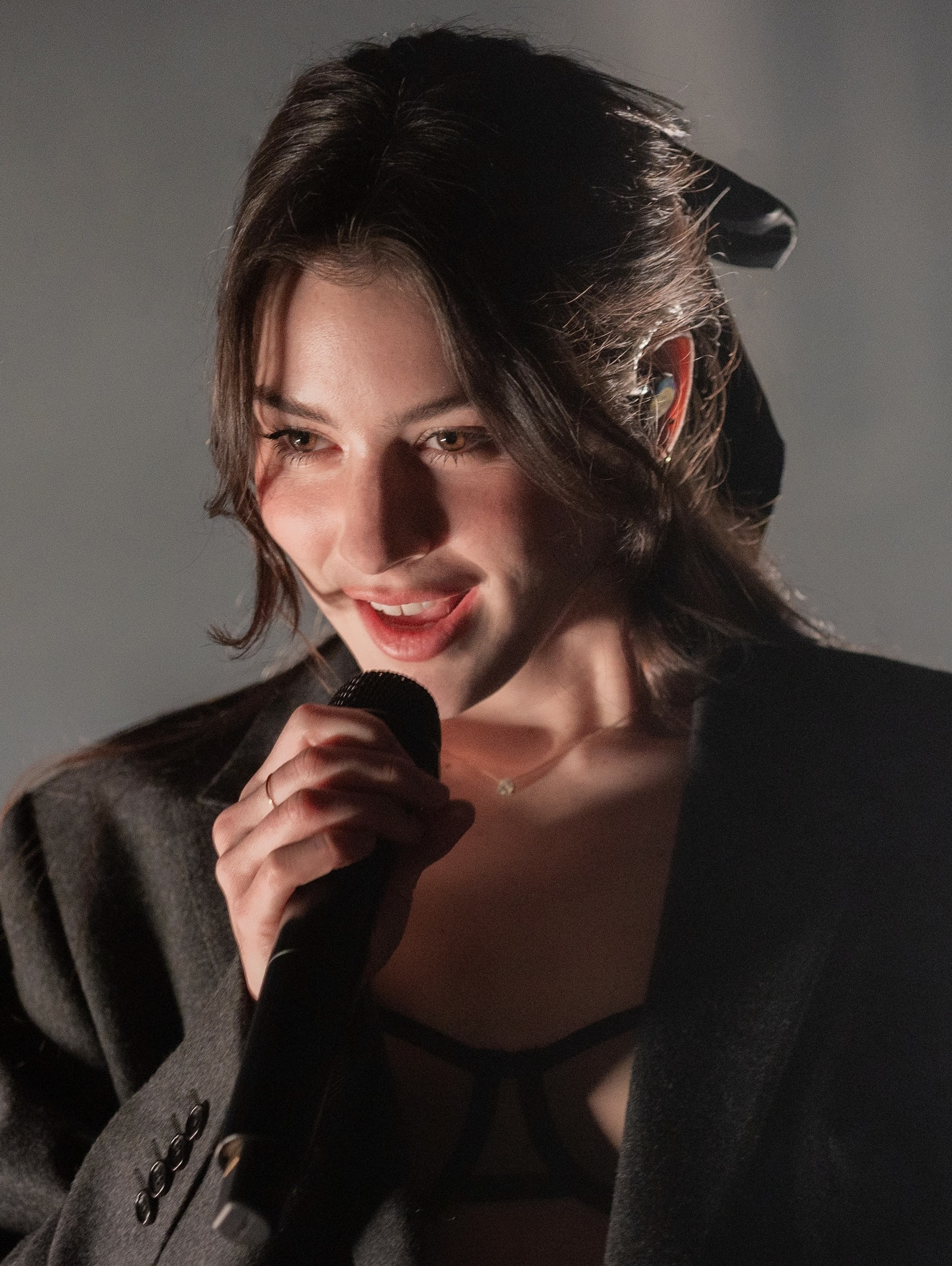
Gracie Abrams

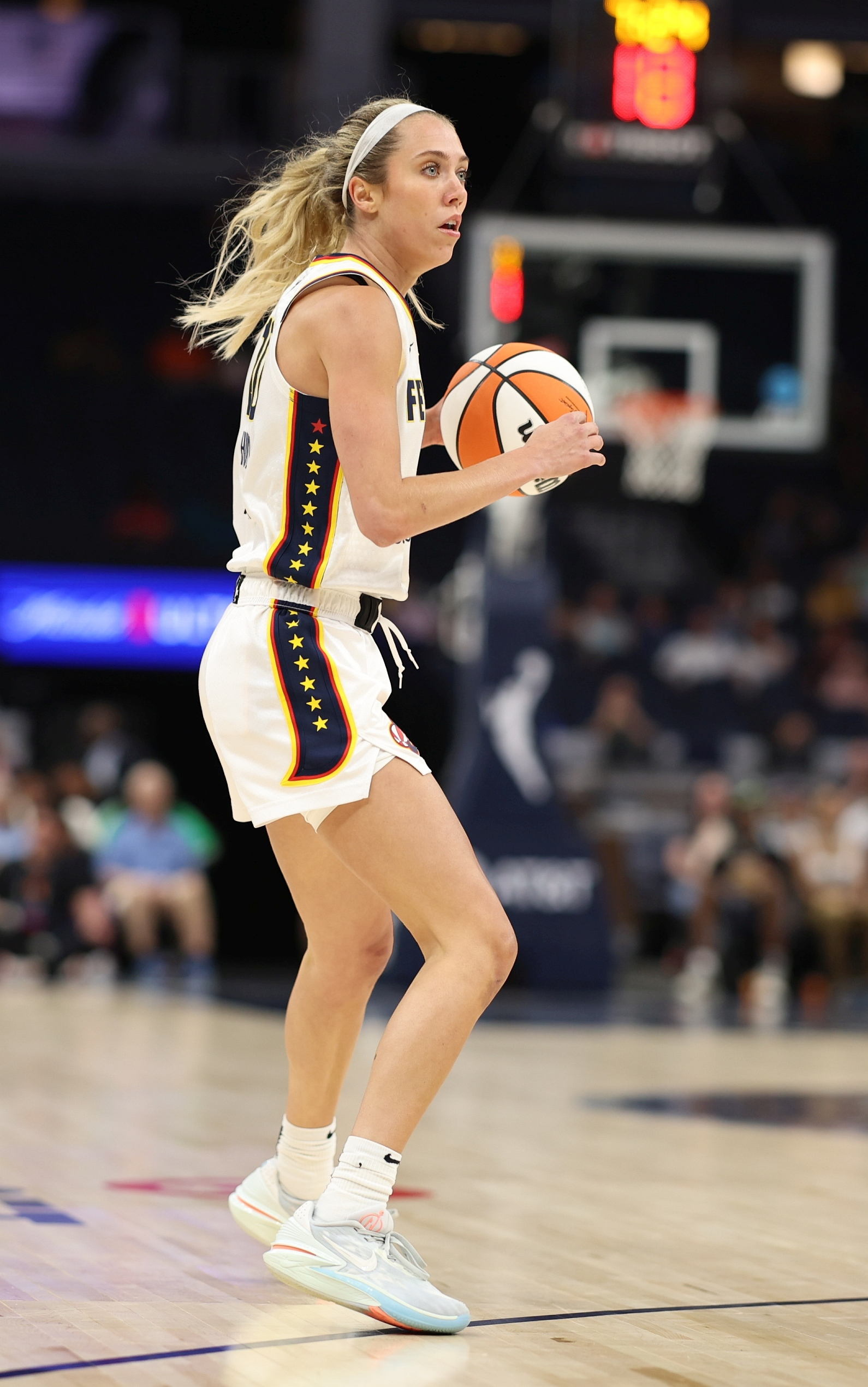
Lexie Hull

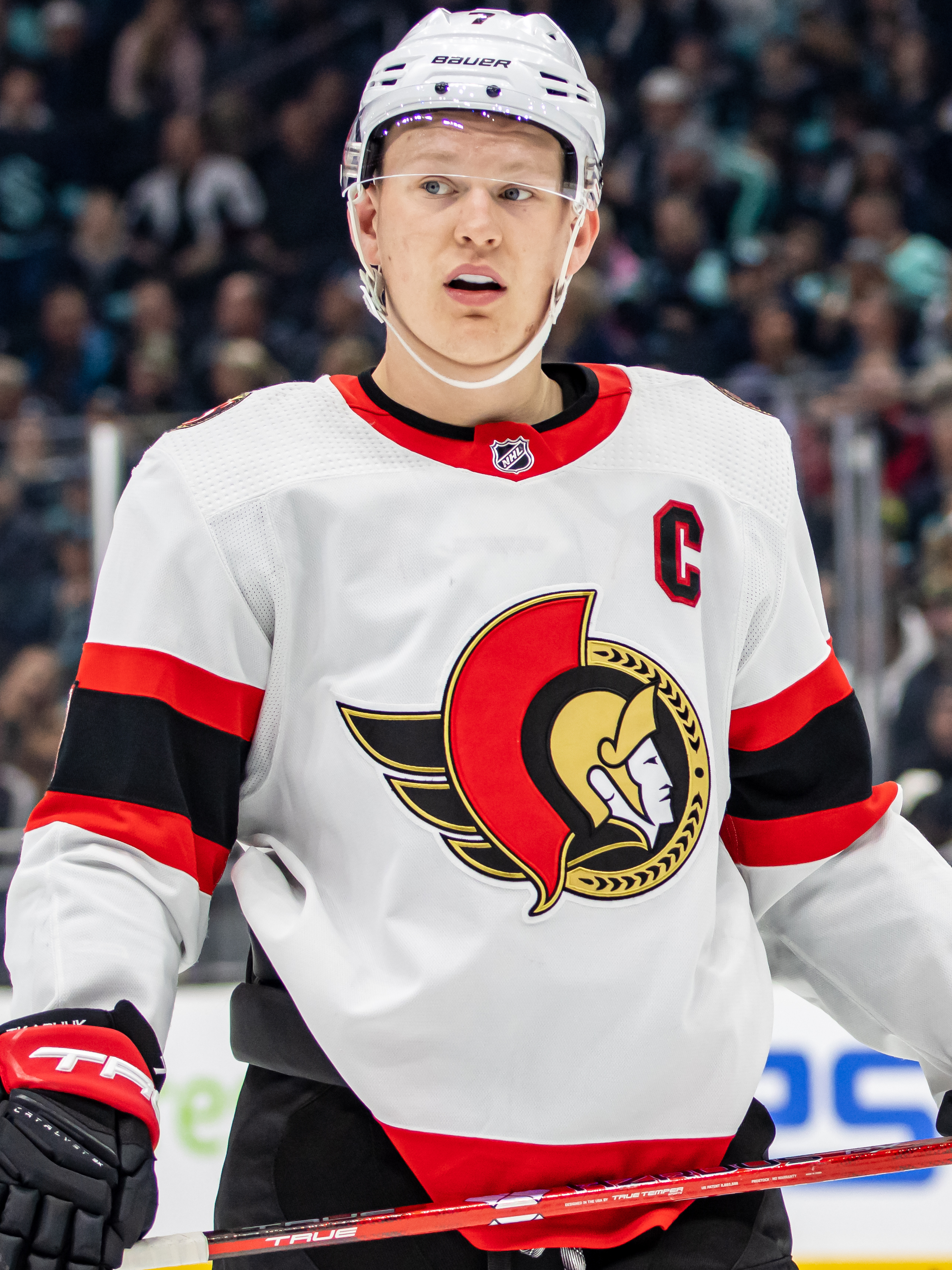
Brady Tkachuk

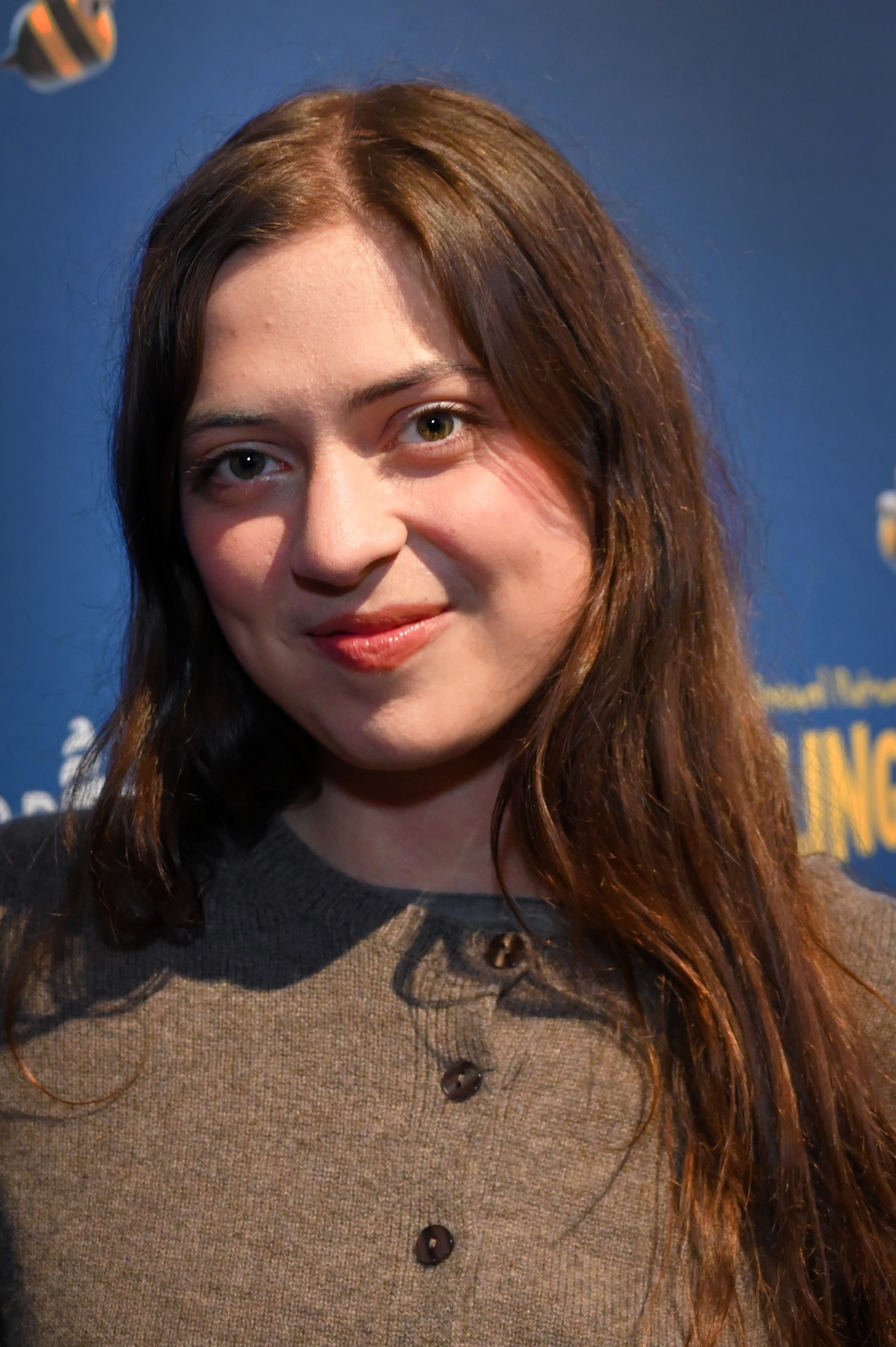
Lizzy McAlpine

- September 1 – Jadagrace, actress, singer, and dancer
- September 2 – Gavin Casalegno, actor
- September 6 – Nicholas Alexander Chavez, actor
- September 7
  - Gracie Abrams, singer/songwriter
  - Cameron Ocasio, actor
- September 13 – Lexie Hull, basketball player
- September 14
  - Emma Kenney, actress
  - Tom Schaar, skateboarder
- September 15 – Jaren Jackson Jr., basketball player
- September 16
  - Clayton DeClemente, Olympic speed skater
  - Brady Tkachuk, ice hockey player
- September 21
  - Brennan LaBrie, journalist
  - Lizzy McAlpine, singer
- September 22 –
  - Curry Barker, filmmaker, actor, comedian and Youruber
  - Tallan Noble Latz, guitarist
- September 28 – Kayla Day, tennis player

=== October ===
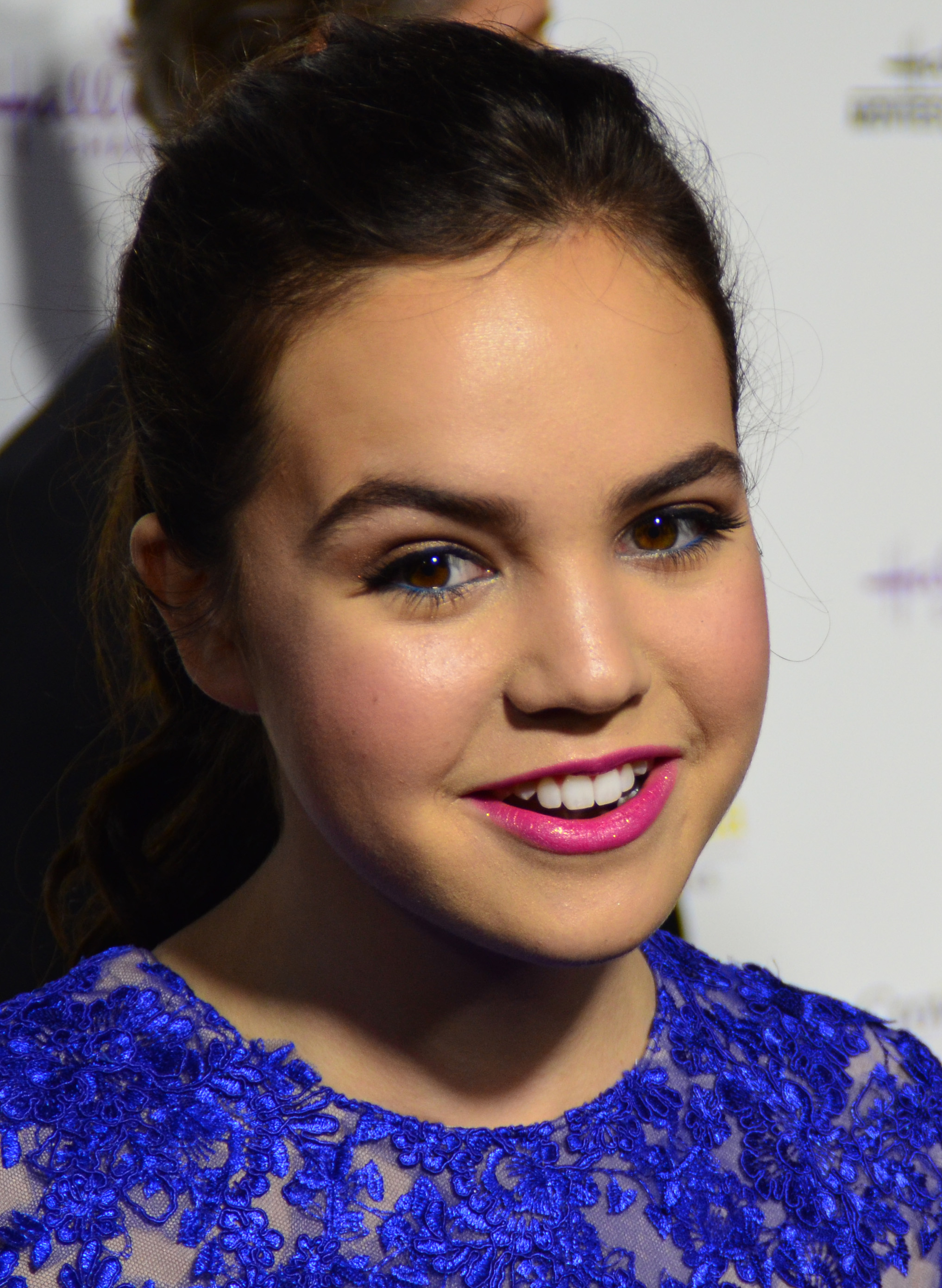
Bailee Madison

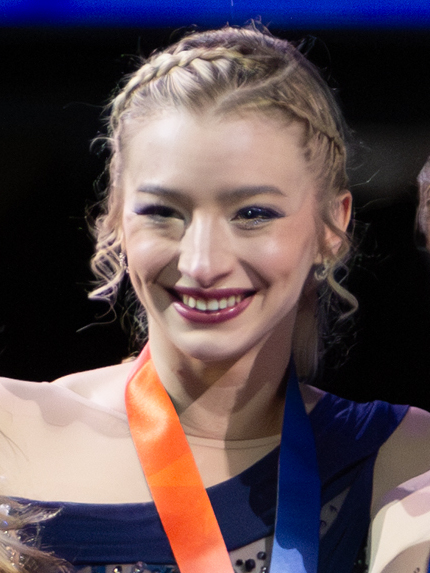
Amber Glenn

- October 3 – Aramis Knight, actor
- October 14
  - Quinn Hughes, ice hockey player
  - Laura Zeng, rhythmic gymnast
- October 15 – Bailee Madison, actress
- October 20 – NBA YoungBoy, rapper
- October 22 – Sub Urban, musician
- October 28 – Amber Glenn, figure skater
- October 31 – Danielle Rose Russell, actress

=== November ===
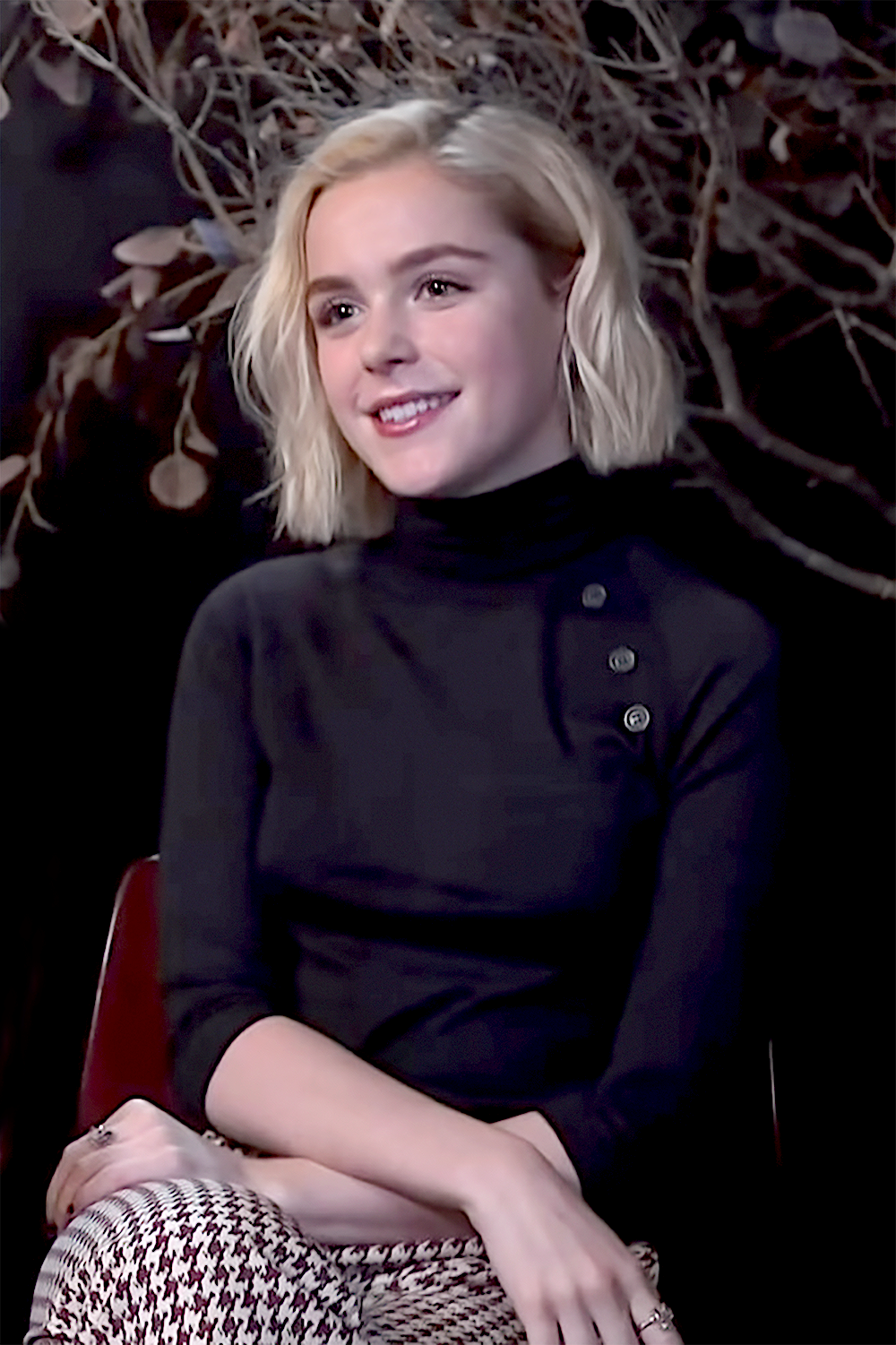
Kiernan Shipka

- November 1 – Buddy Handleson, actor
- November 8 – Pooh Shiesty, rapper
- November 10
  - Michael Cimino, actor
  - Kiernan Shipka, actress
- November 11
  - X González, gun control activist
  - Samara Joy, singer
- November 15 – Sydney Towle, social media content creator (d. 2026)
- November 23 – Nikki Castillo, voice actress
- November 28 – Lexi Held, basketball player
- November 29 – River Alexander, actor
- November 30 – Ryan Deitsch, gun control activist

=== December ===
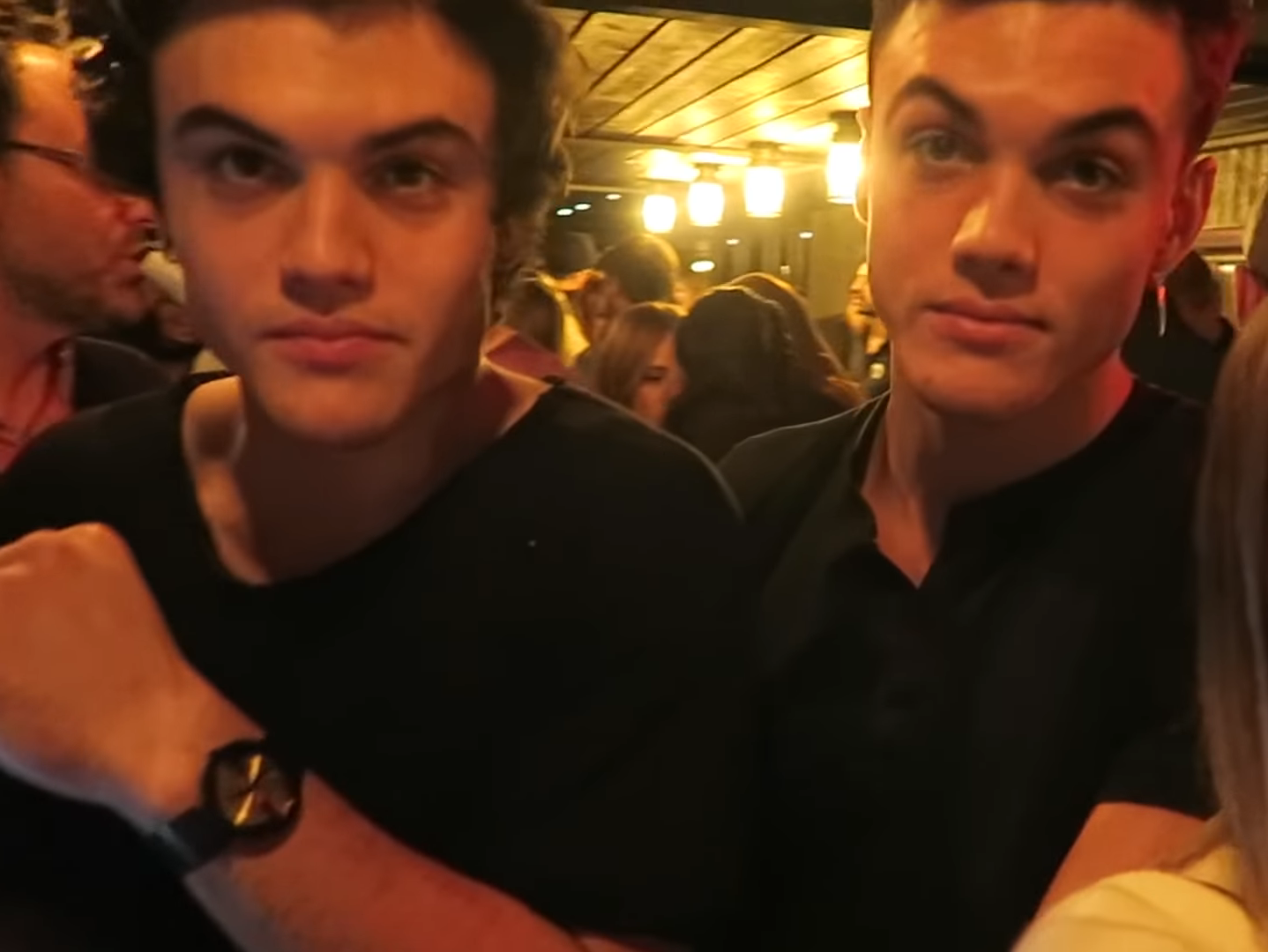
Dolan Twins

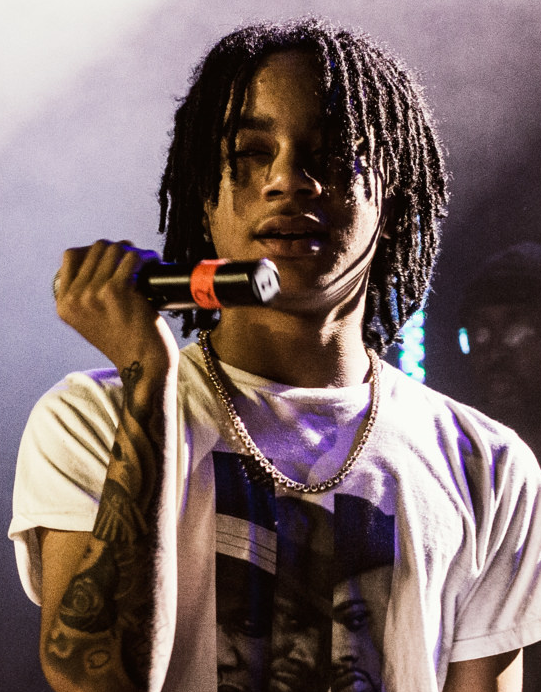
YBN Nahmir

- December 2
  - Samuel Armas, notable fetal patient
  - Fred Hechinger, actor
- December 6
  - Mario Judah, musician
  - Ryan Wynott, actor
- December 16 – Dolan Twins, YouTube comedians
- December 18 – YBN Nahmir, rapper and songwriter

=== Full date unknown ===
- Aaron Bushnell, serviceman (d. 2024)
- Lex, notable canine (d. 2012)
- Lia Thomas, swimmer

== Deaths ==
=== January ===
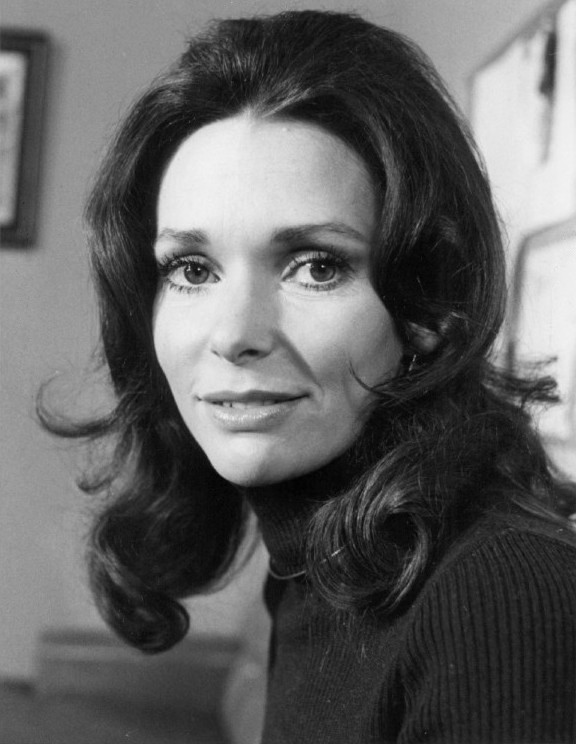
Susan Strasberg

- January 4 – Iron Eyes Cody, Italian-American actor (b. 1904)
- January 5 – Paul Zoll, American cardiologist (b. 1911)
- January 12 – Betty Lou Gerson, American actress (b. 1914)
- January 18 – Sarah Louise Delany, American author and educator (b. 1889)
- January 21
  - Charles Brown, American singer and pianist (b. 1922)
  - Susan Strasberg, American actress (b. 1938)
- January 23 – John Osteen, American televangelist (b. 1921)
- January 25
  - Sarah Louise Delany, educator and civil rights activist (b. 1889)
  - Robert Shaw, American conductor (b. 1916)
- January 29 – Lili St. Cyr, burlesque and stripper (b. 1917)
- January 30 – Huntz Hall, actor (b. 1920)
- January 31 – Norm Zauchin, American baseball player (b. 1929)

=== February ===
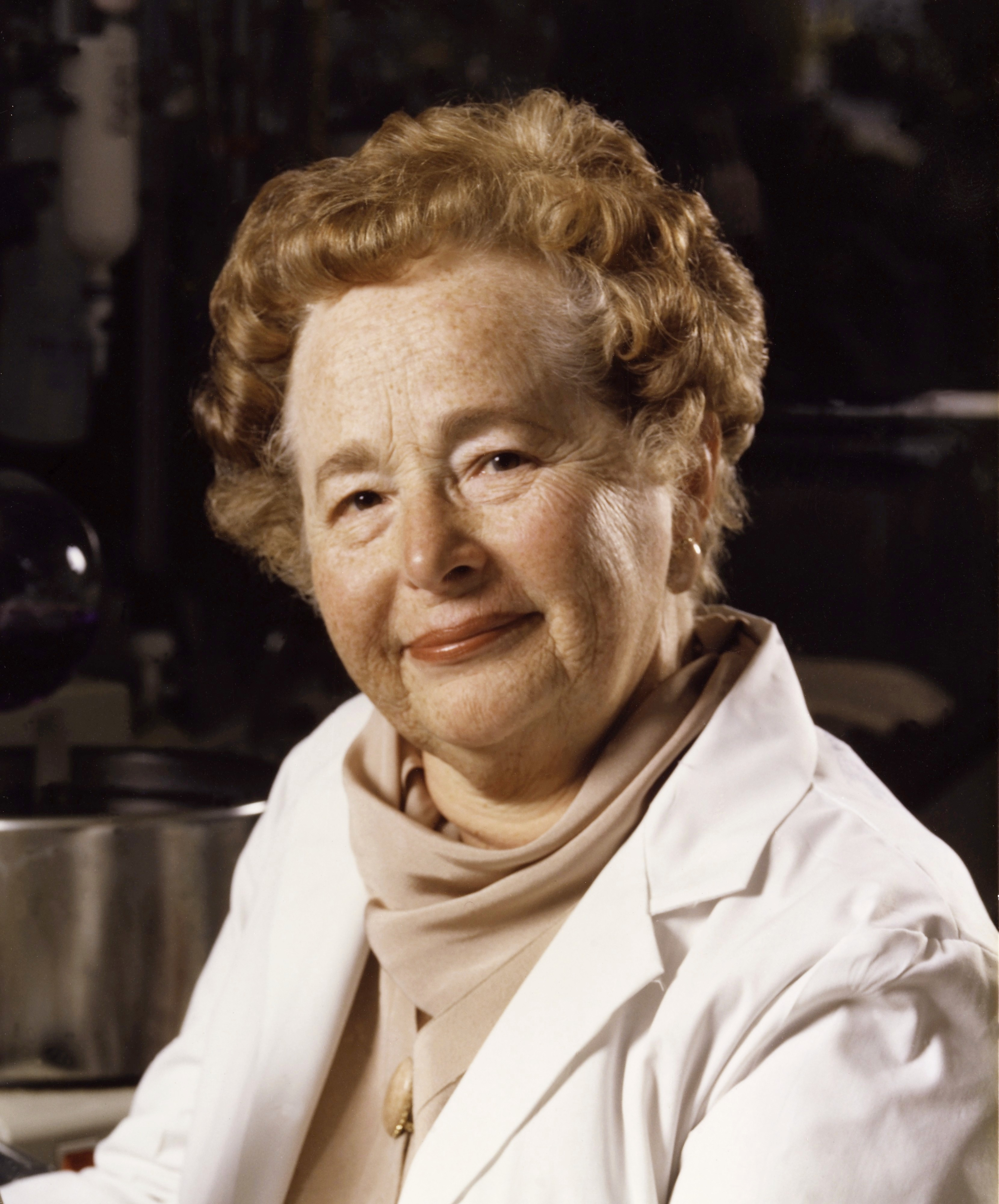
Gertrude B. Elion

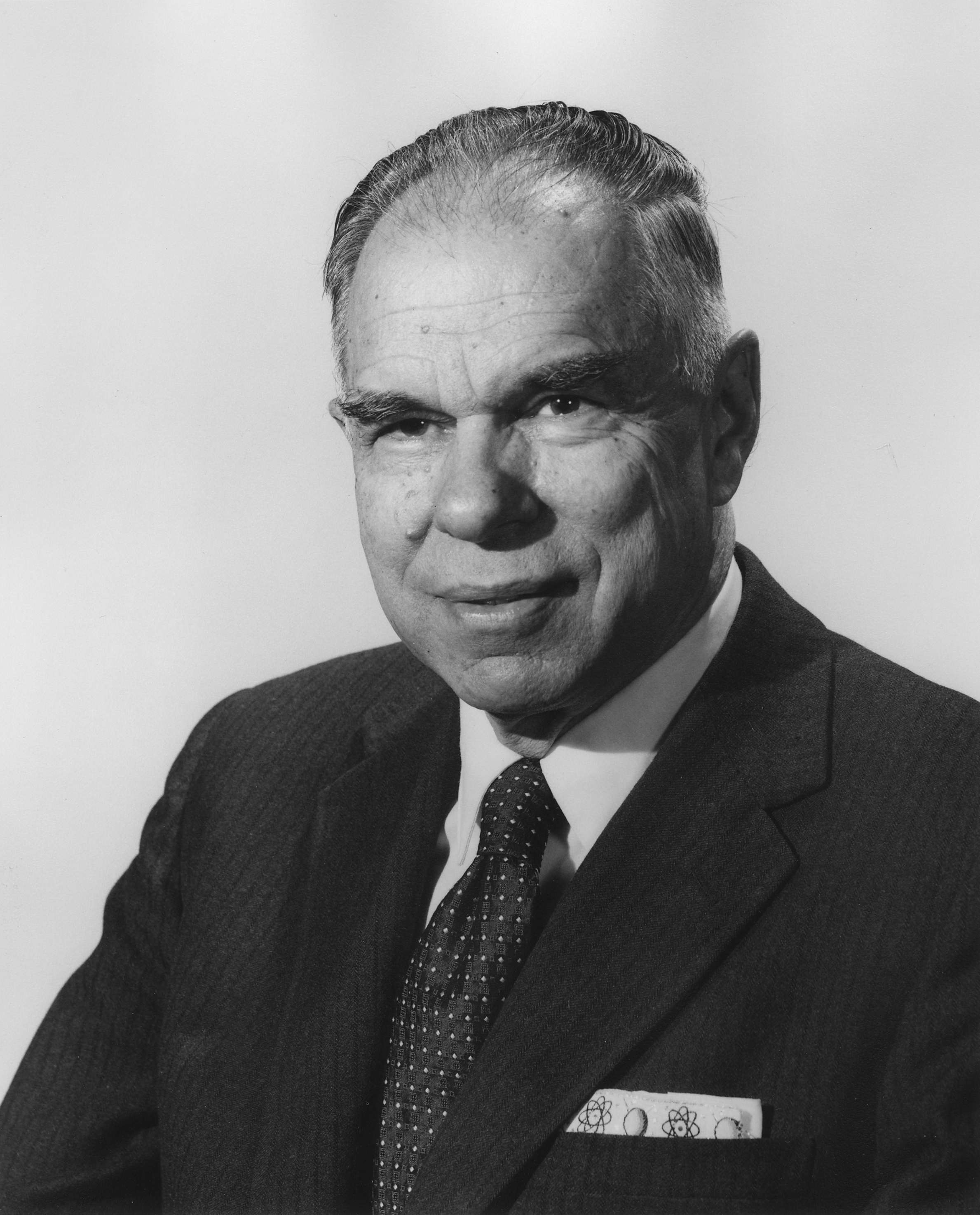
Glenn T. Seaborg

- February 1 – Paul Mellon, American philanthropist (b. 1907)
- February 6 – Jimmy Roberts, American singer (b. 1924)
- February 7 – Bobby Troup, American actor, jazz pianist, singer and songwriter (b. 1918)
- February 11 – Jaki Byard, American jazz musician (b. 1922)
- February 14
  - Buddy Knox, American singer and songwriter (b. 1933)
  - John Ehrlichman, American Watergate scandal figure (b. 1925)
- February 15
  - Big L, American rapper (b. 1974)
  - Henry Way Kendall, American physicist (b. 1926)
- February 16 – Michael Larson, Press Your Luck contestant (b. 1949)
- February 18
  - Andreas Feininger, French-born American photographer (b. 1906)
  - Noam Pitlik, American actor and director (b. 1932)
- February 20 – Gene Siskel, American film critic (b. 1946)
- February 21 – Gertrude B. Elion, American biochemist and pharmacologist (b. 1918)
- February 22 – William Bronk, American poet (b. 1918)
- February 23 – The Renegade, American wrestler (b. 1965)
- February 24
  - Andre Dubus, American short-story writer (b. 1936)
  - Virginia Foster Durr, American civil rights activist (b. 1903)
- February 25 – Glenn T. Seaborg, American chemist (b. 1912)
- February 28 – Bill Talbert, American tennis player (b. 1918)

=== March ===
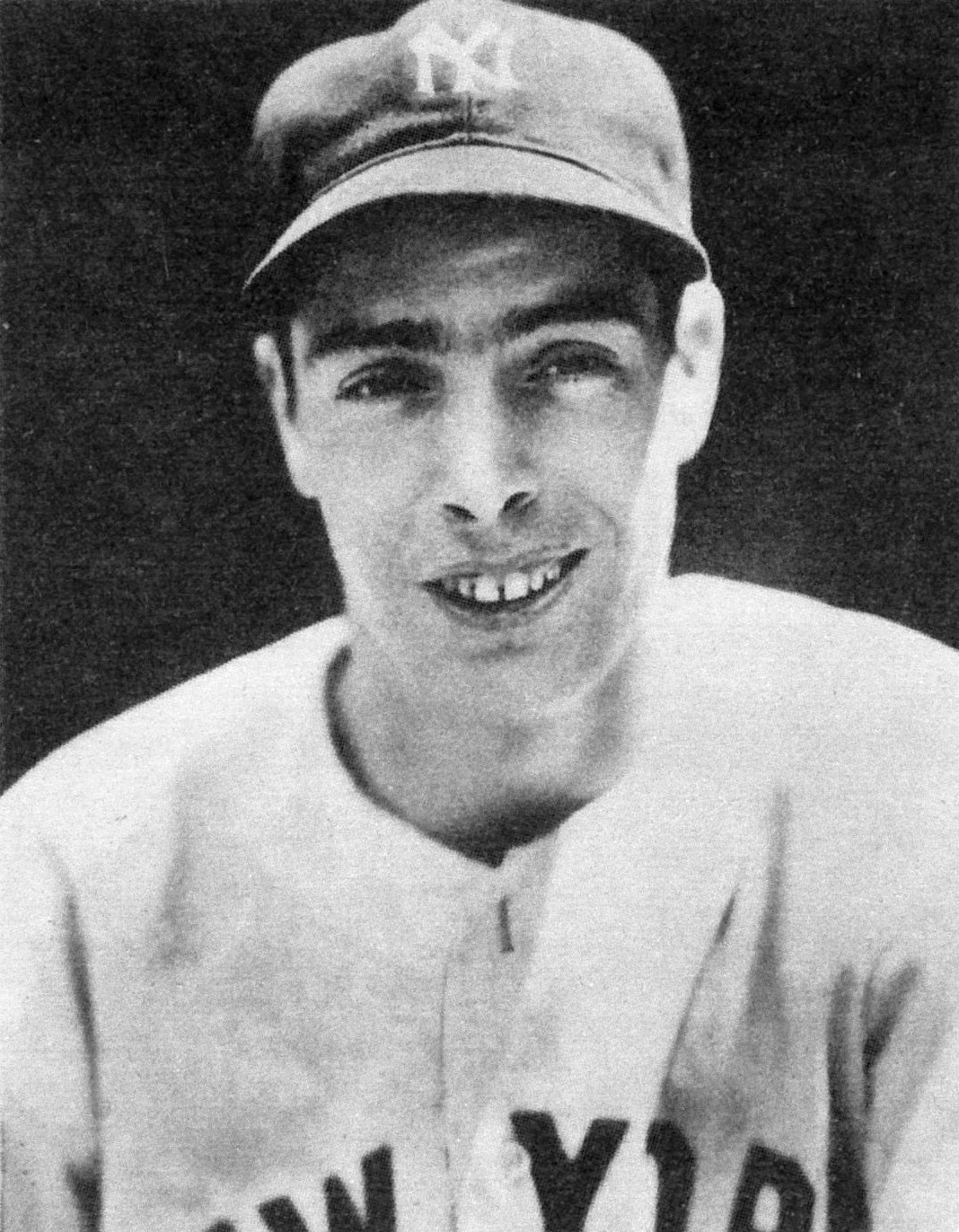
Joe DiMaggio

- March 1 – Ann Corio, American dancer and actress (b. 1909)
- March 3 – Jackson C. Frank, American folk musician (b. 1943)
- March 4
  - Harry Blackmun, American judge (b. 1908)
  - Del Close, American actor, writer, and teacher (b. 1934)
  - Hawley Pratt, American film director, animator and illustrator (b. 1911)
- March 5 – Richard Kiley, American actor (b. 1922)
- March 7
  - Sidney Gottlieb, American intelligence official (b. 1918)
  - Stanley Kubrick, American film director and producer (b. 1928)
- March 8
  - Peggy Cass, American actress and comedian (b. 1924)
  - Joe DiMaggio, American baseball player, advertising spokesman (b. 1914)
- March 12 – Yehudi Menuhin, American violinist (b. 1916)
- March 13
  - Lee Falk, American writer, theater director, and producer (b. 1911)
  - Garson Kanin, American playwright and screenwriter (b. 1912)
- March 17
  - Ernest Gold, Austrian-born American composer (b. 1921)
  - Herbert E. Grier, American electrical engineer (b. 1911)
- March 22 – David Strickland, American actor (b. 1969)
- March 25 – Cal Ripken Sr., American baseball coach and manager (b. 1935)
- March 26 – David Holliday, American actor (b. 1937)
- March 29 – Joe Williams, American singer (b. 1918)
- March 30 – Terry Wilson, American actor (b. 1923)

=== April ===
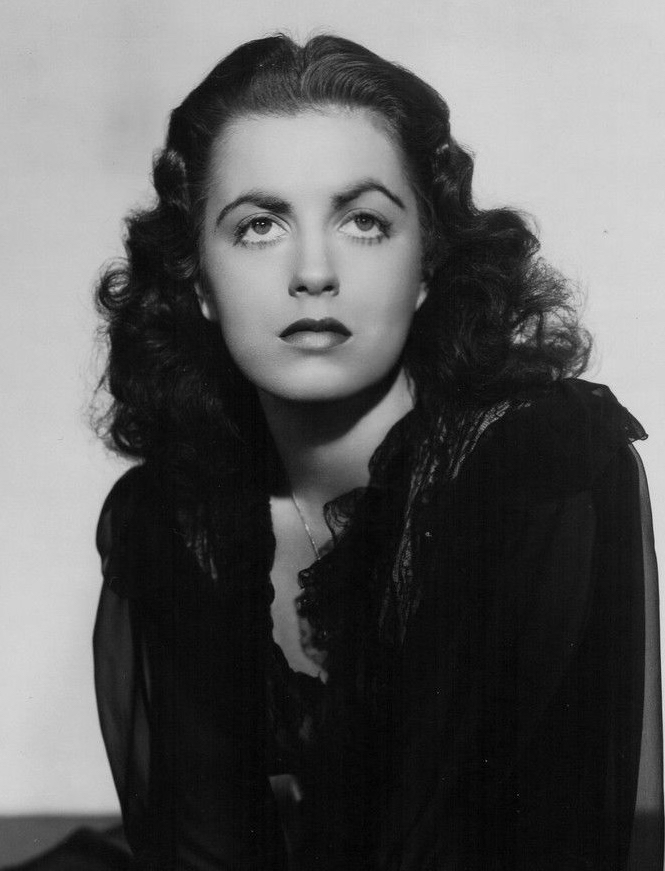
Faith Domergue

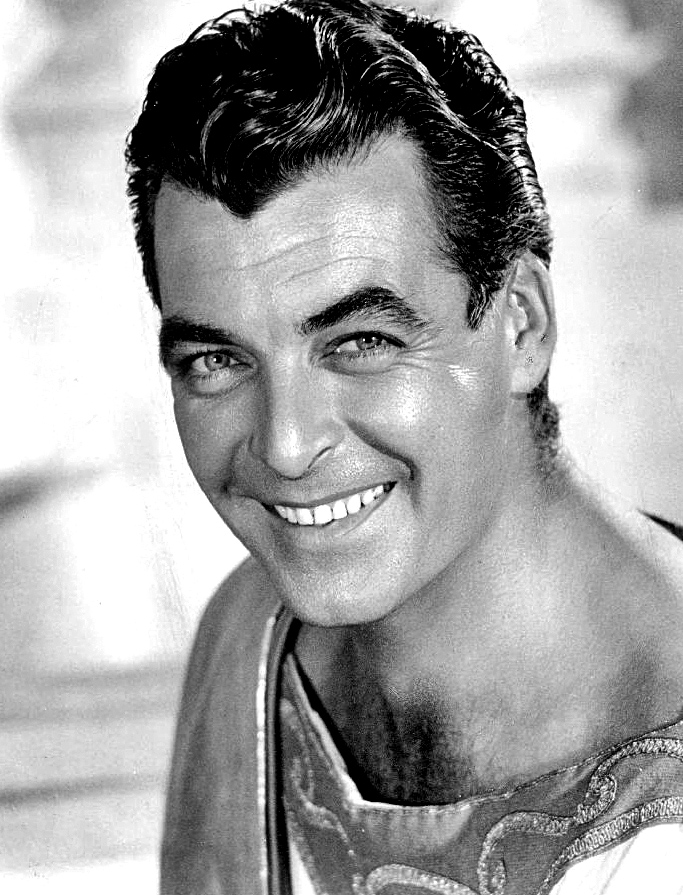
Rory Calhoun

- April 4
  - Faith Domergue, American actress (b. 1924)
  - Early Wynn, American baseball player (b. 1920)
- April 10 – Jean Vander Pyl, American television actress (b. 1919)
- April 12 – Boxcar Willie, American country music singer (b. 1931)
- April 14
  - Ellen Corby, American actress (b. 1911)
  - Anthony Newley, English actor singer, and composer (b. 1931)
- April 15 – Roy Chiao, Chinese actor (b. 1927)
- April 16
  - Charles McKimson, American animator (b. 1914)
  - Abbott Pattison, American sculptor and abstract artist (b. 1916)
  - Skip Spence, Canadian-born American singer and songwriter (b. 1946)
- April 18 – Herman Miller, American screenwriter and producer (b. 1919)
- April 20
  - Cassie Bernall, American murder victim (b. 1981)
  - Eric Harris, American mass murderer (b. 1981)
  - Dylan Klebold, American mass murderer (b. 1981)
  - Rick Rude, American professional wrestler (b. 1958)
  - Rachel Scott, American murder victim (b. 1981)
- April 21 – Charles "Buddy" Rogers, American silent film actor (b. 1904)
- April 22 – Bert Remsen, American actor (b. 1925)
- April 25 – Roger Troutman, American funk musician (b. 1951)
- April 27 – Al Hirt, American trumpeter and bandleader (b. 1922)
- April 28
  - Rory Calhoun, American television and film actor (b. 1922)
  - Arthur Leonard Schawlow, American physicist (b. 1921)

=== May ===
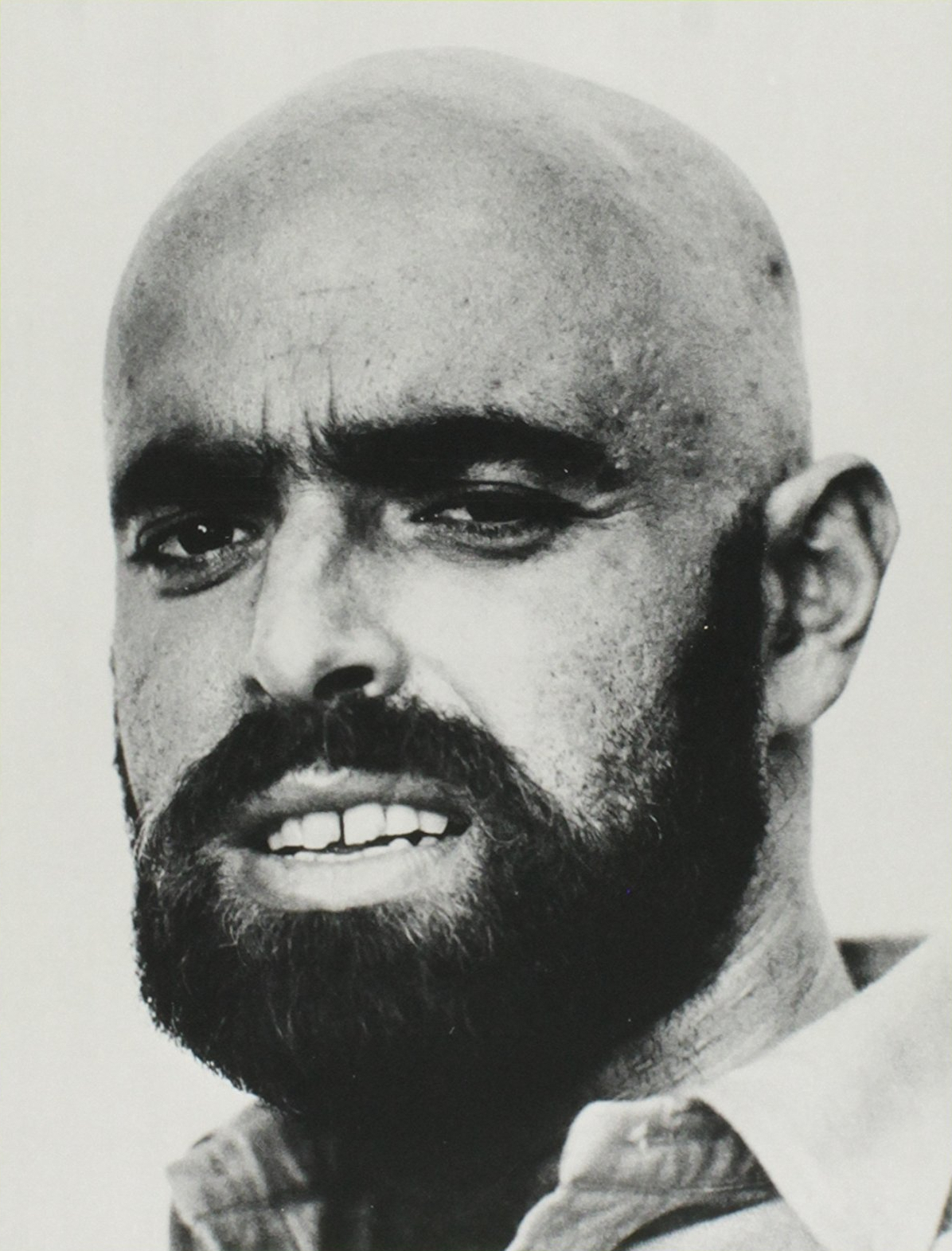
Shel Silverstein

- May 8 – Dana Plato, American actress (b. 1964)
- May 10 – Shel Silverstein, American poet, singer-songwriter, cartoonist, screenwriter, and author of children's books (b. 1930)
- May 13 – Gene Sarazen, American golfer (b. 1902)
- May 17 – Henry Jones, American actor (b. 1912)
- May 18 – Betty Robinson, American athlete (b. 1911)
- May 19 – Candy Candido, American voice actor (b. 1913)
- May 23
  - Owen Hart, Canadian wrestler (b. 1965)
  - John T. Hayward, American admiral (b. 1908)
- May 26 – Waldo Semon, American inventor (b. 1898)
- May 31 – Charles Pierce, American impressionist (b. 1926)

=== June ===
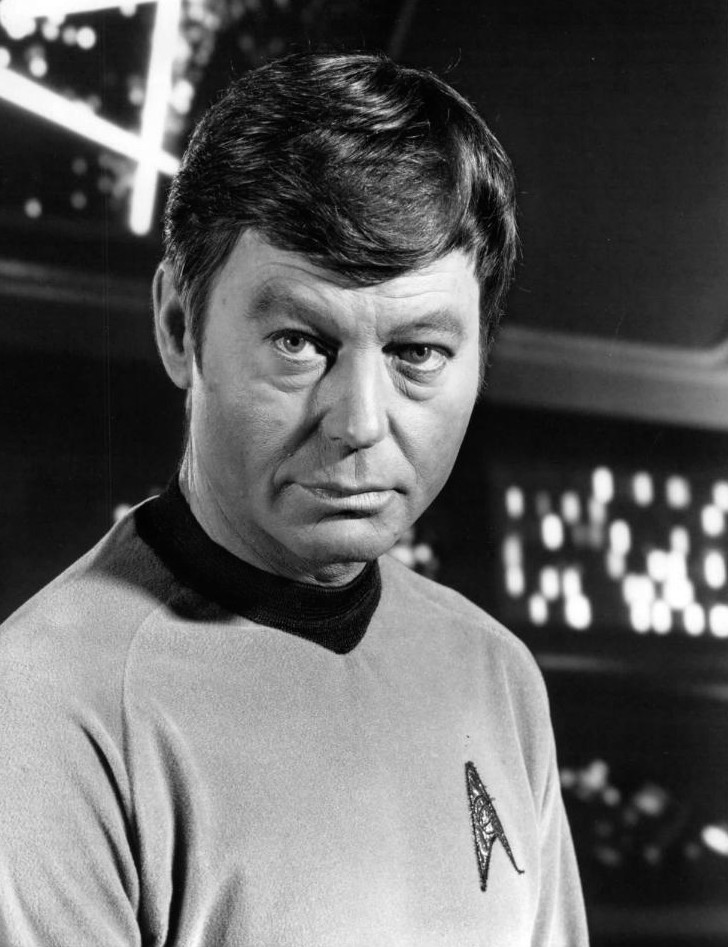
DeForest Kelley

- June 3 – Charlene Pryer, American professional baseball player (b. 1921)
- June 5 – Mel Tormé, American singer (b. 1925)
- June 9 – Andrew L. Stone, American screenwriter, director and producer (b. 1902)
- June 11 – DeForest Kelley, American actor (b. 1920)
- June 19 – Paul Montgomery, American entrepreneur and inventor (b. 1960)
- June 25 – Fred Trump, American real estate developer, father of Donald Trump (b. 1905)
- June 27
  - Isaac C. Kidd, Jr., American admiral (b. 1919)
  - Marion Motley, American football player (b. 1920)
- June 29 – Allan Carr, American producer (b. 1937)

=== July ===
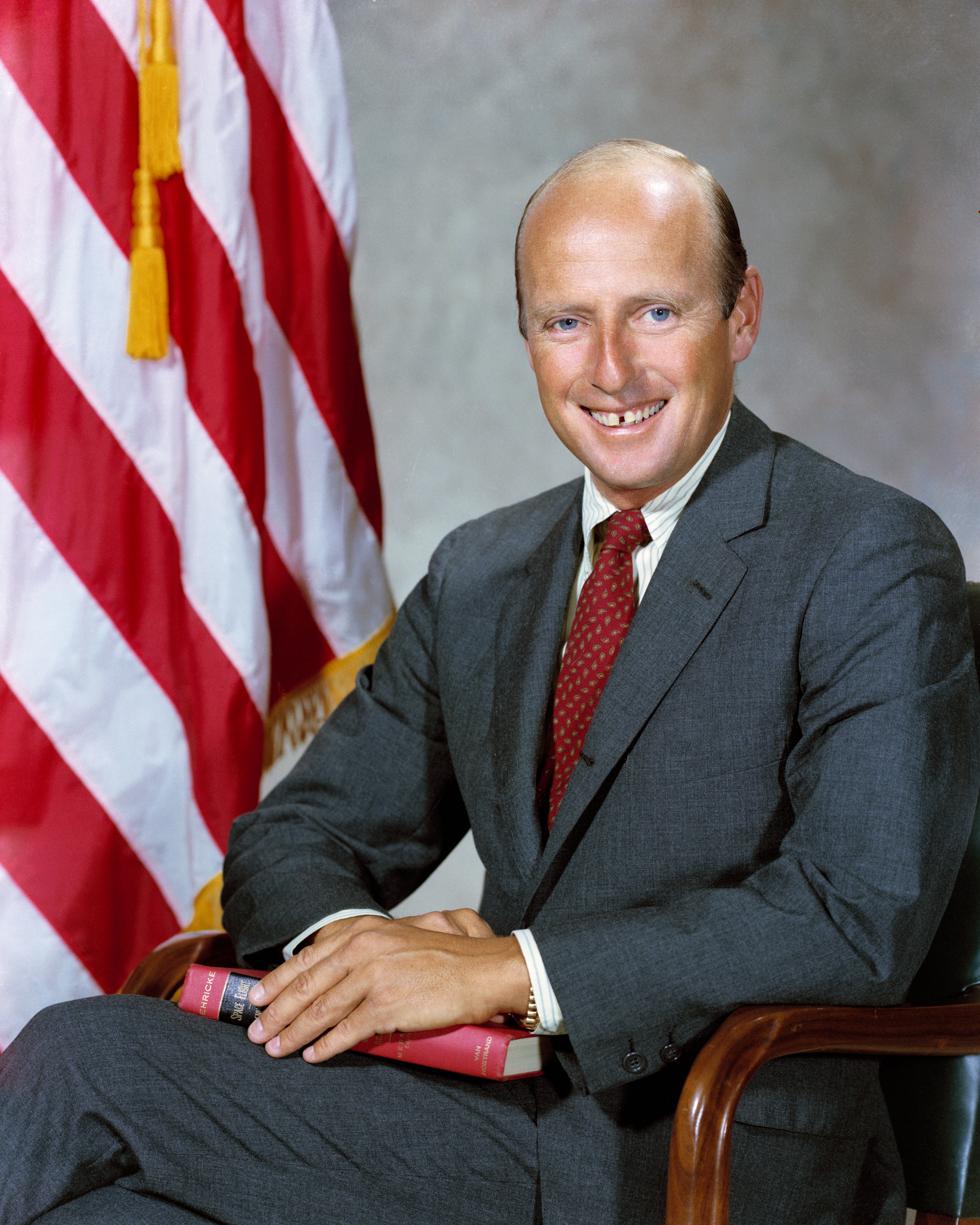
Pete Conrad

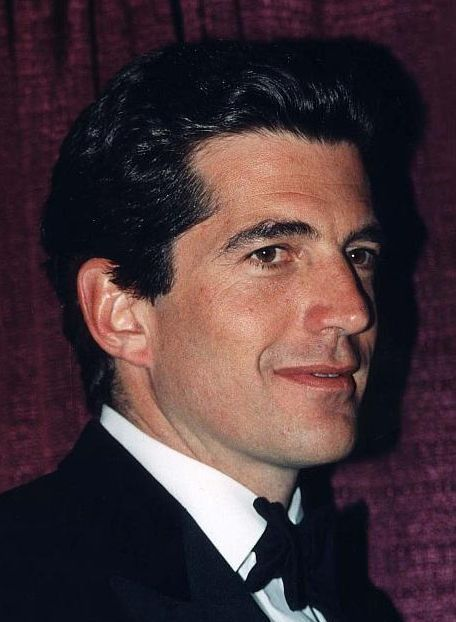
John F. Kennedy Jr.

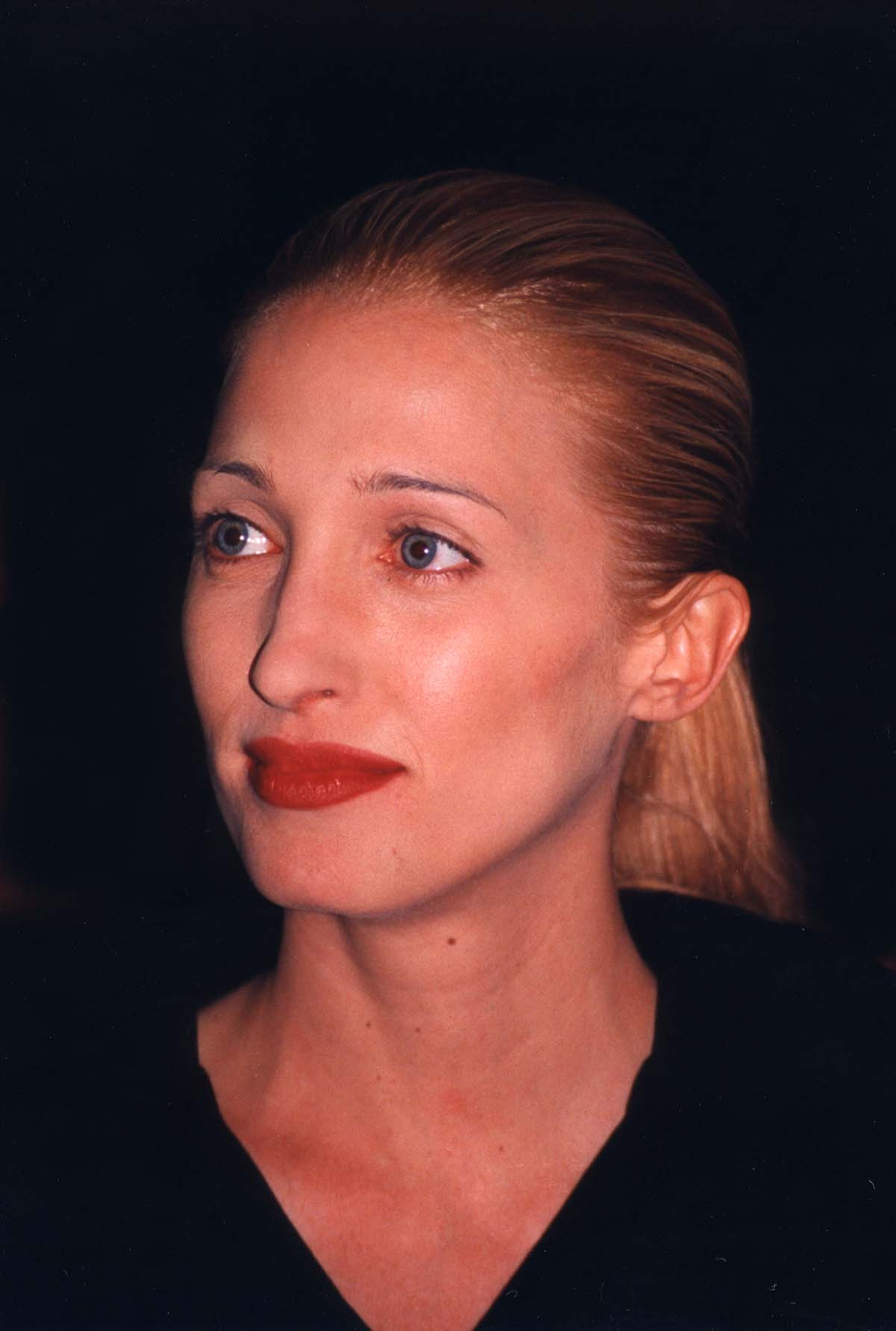
Carolyn Bessette Kennedy

- July 1
  - Edward Dmytryk, Canadian-American film director (b. 1908)
  - Forrest Mars Sr., businessman and director of Mars Inc. (b. 1904)
  - Guy Mitchell, American singer (b. 1927)
  - Sylvia Sidney, American actress (b. 1910)
- July 2 – Mario Puzo, American author (b. 1920)
- July 3 – Mark Sandman, American rock musician and artist (b. 1952)
- July 6
  - Carl Gunter Jr., American farmer and politician (b. 1938)
  - Gary M. Heidnik, American killer, kidnapper, and rapist (b. 1943)
- July 7 – Julie Campbell Tatham, American writer (b. 1908)
- July 8 – Pete Conrad, American astronaut, naval aviator, and aeronautical engineer (b. 1930)
- July 9 – James Farmer, American civil rights leader (b. 1920)
- July 11 – Helen Forrest, American jazz singer (b. 1917)
- July 16
  - John F. Kennedy Jr., American journalist and lawyer (b. 1960)
  - Carolyn Bessette Kennedy, American actress and model (b. 1966)
- July 20 – Sandra Gould, American actress (b. 1916)
- July 22 – Gar Samuelson, American drummer (b. 1958)
- July 29 – Anita Carter, American singer (b. 1933)

=== August ===
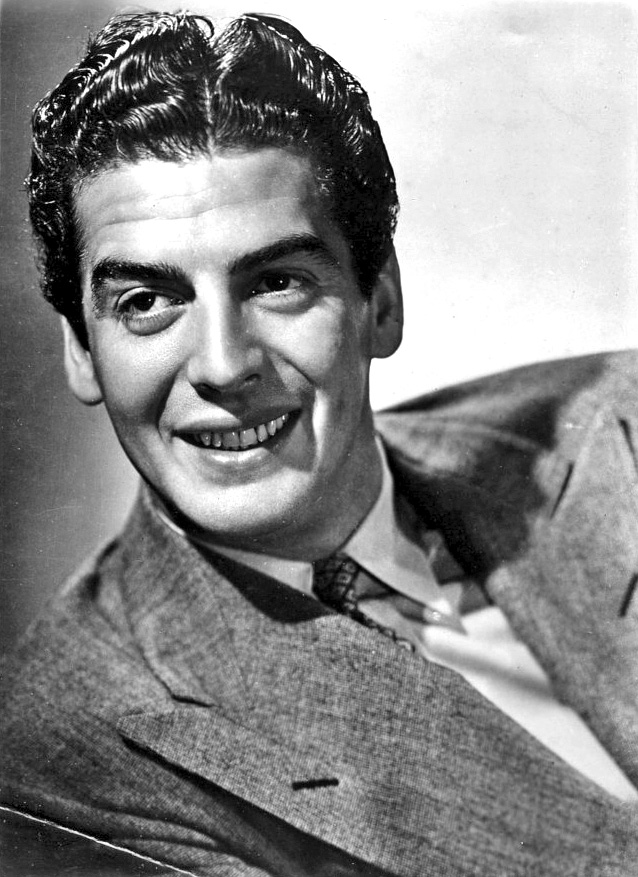
Victor Mature

- August 2 – Willie Morris, American writer (b. 1934)
- August 3
  - Marion O. McKinney Jr., American aerospace scientist (b. 1921)
  - Leroy Vinnegar, American musician (b. 1928)
- August 4 – Victor Mature, American actor (b. 1913)
- August 7 – John Van Ryn, American tennis player (b. 1905)
- August 10 – Anthony Stanislas Radziwill, American television executive and filmmaker (b. 1959)
- August 14
  - Lane Kirkland, American union leader (b. 1922)
  - Philip Klutznick, American administrator, secretary of commerce (b. 1907)
  - Pee Wee Reese, American baseball player (b. 1918)
- August 23 – Norman Wexler, American screenwriter (b. 1926)
- August 24 – Mary Jane Croft, American radio and television actress (b. 1916)

=== September ===
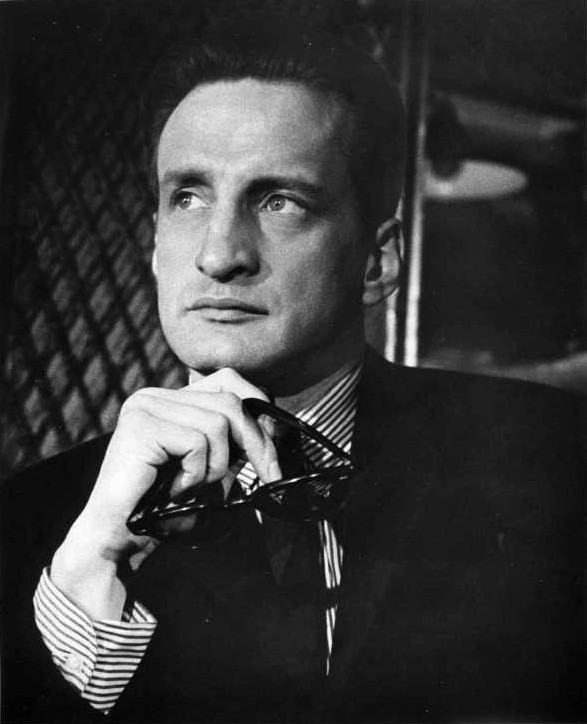
George C. Scott

- September 5 – Allen Funt, American television personality (b. 1914)
- September 7 – Jim Keith, American author (b. 1949)
- September 8 – Moondog, American musician and composer (b. 1916)
- September 9
  - Catfish Hunter, American baseball player (b. 1946)
  - Ruth Roman, American actress (b. 1922)
- September 12 – Allen Stack, American swimmer (b. 1928)
- September 22 – George C. Scott, American actor (b. 1927)
- September 25 – Marion Zimmer Bradley, American writer (b. 1930)

=== October ===
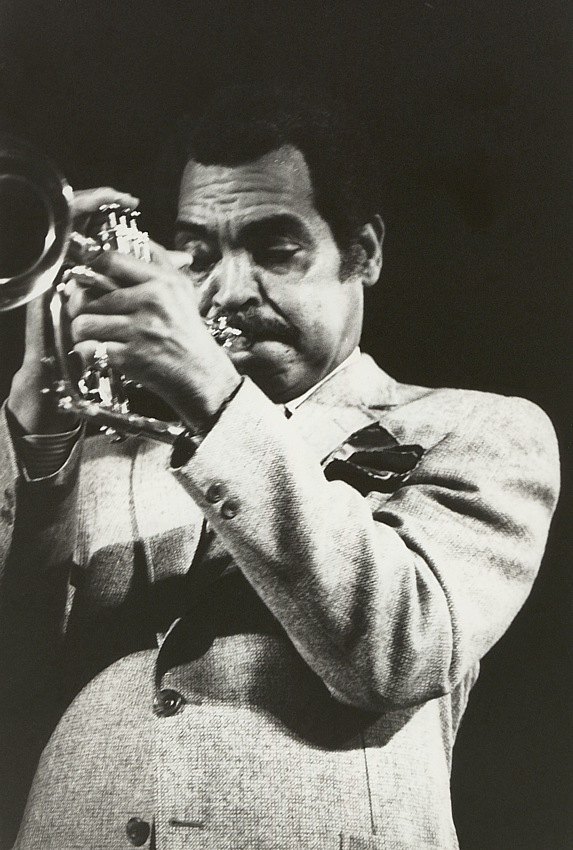
Art Farmer

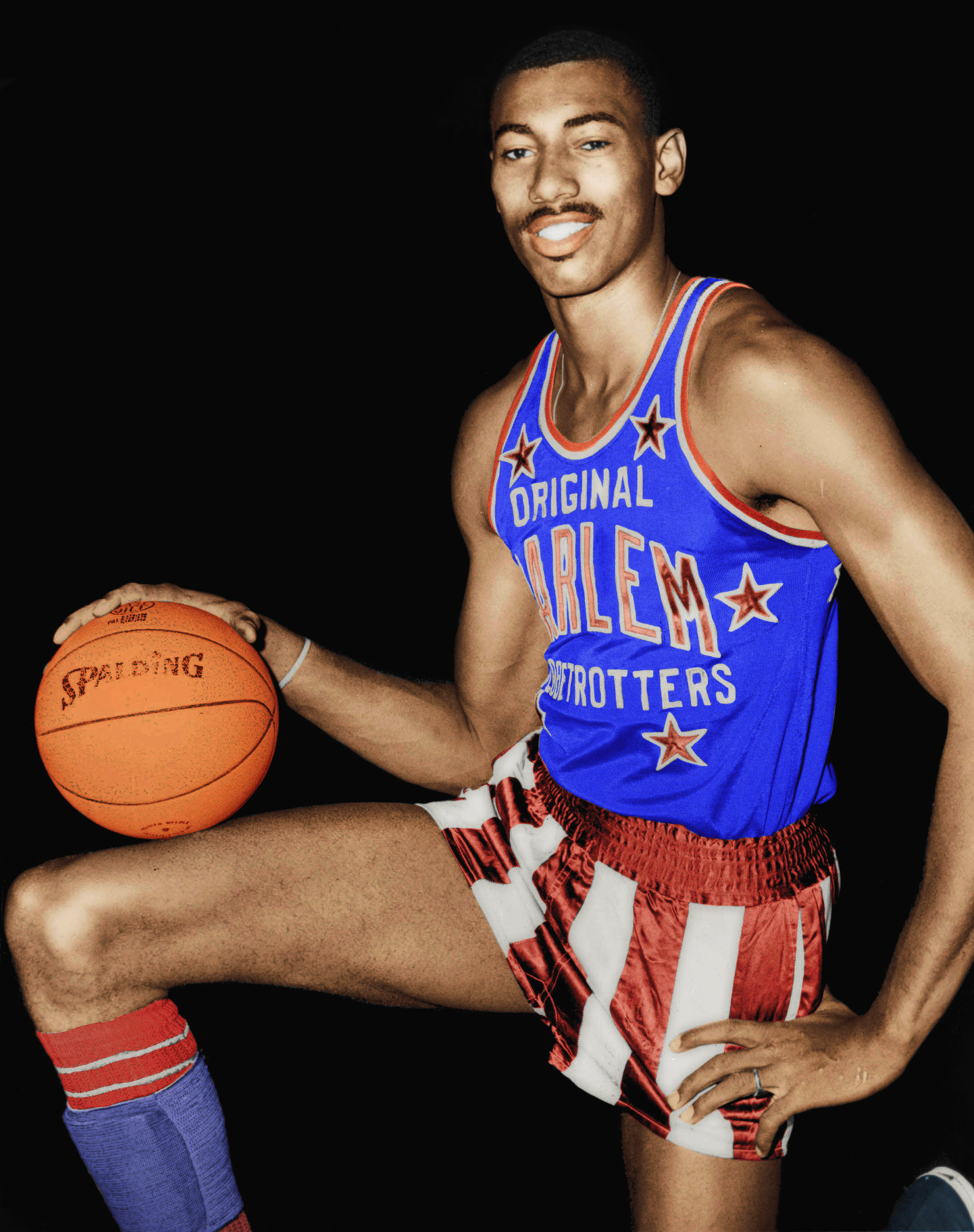
Wilt Chamberlain

- October 1 – Glen Foster, American Olympic sailor (b. 1930)
- October 2
  - Lee Lozano, American artist (b. 1930)
  - Danny Mayo, American songwriter (b. 1950)
- October 3 – Paul Burris, American baseball player (b. 1923)
- October 4 – Art Farmer, American jazz trumpeter (b. 1928)
- October 5 – Alex Lowe, American mountaineer (b. 1958)
- October 6 – Gorilla Monsoon, American professional wrestler and announcer (b. 1937)
- October 7
  - David A. Huffman, American computer scientist (b. 1925)
  - Helen Vinson, American actress (b. 1907)
- October 8 – John McLendon, American basketball coach (b. 1915)
- October 9 – Milt Jackson, American musician (b. 1923)
- October 10 – George Forrest, American writer (b. 1915)
- October 12 – Wilt Chamberlain, American basketball player (b. 1936)
- October 16 – Jean Shepherd, writer and personality (b. 1921)
- October 19 – James C. Murray, American politician (b. 1917)
- October 24 – John Chafee, American politician (b. 1922)
- October 25 – Payne Stewart, American golfer (b. 1957)
- October 26
  - Hoyt Axton, singer, songwriter, guitarist, and actor (b. 1938)
  - Abraham Polonsky, American screenwriter and director (b. 1910)
- October 27
  - Frank De Vol, American arranger, composer, and actor (b. 1911)
  - Robert Mills, American physicist (b. 1927)
- October 29 – Tom Dickinson, American football player (b. 1897)

=== November ===
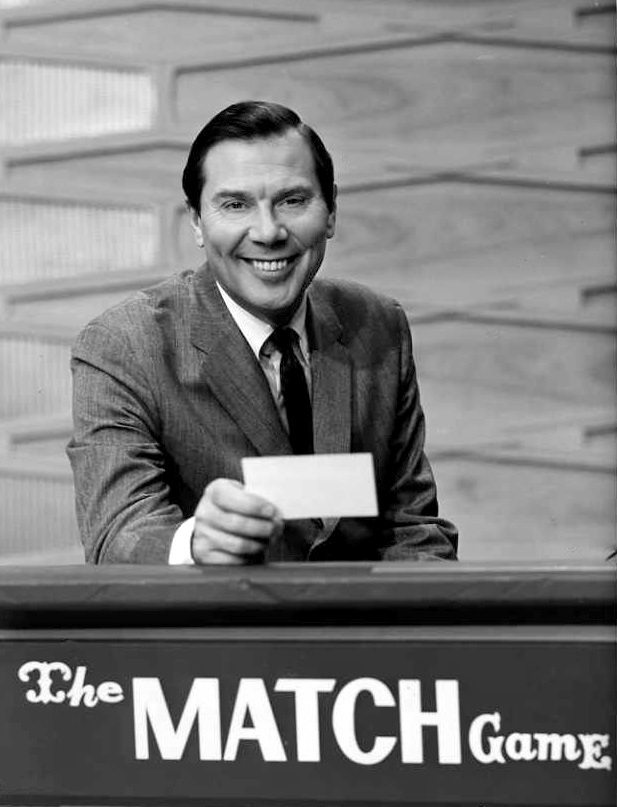
Gene Rayburn

- November 1
  - Theodore Hall, American physicist and spy (b. 1925)
  - Walter Payton, American football player (b. 1954)
- November 4 – Daisy Bates, American civil rights activist, publisher, journalist, and lecturer (b. 1914)
- November 9 – Mabel King, American actress and singer (b. 1932)
- November 11 – Mary Kay Bergman, American voice actress (b. 1961)
- November 15 – Gene Levitt, American television writer, producer, and director (b. 1920)
- November 16 – Daniel Nathans, American microbiologist, recipient of the Nobel Prize in Physiology or Medicine (b. 1928)
- November 18
  - Paul Bowles, American novelist (b. 1910)
  - Horst P. Horst, American photographer (b. 1906)
  - Doug Sahm, American musician (b. 1941)
- November 21 – Ralph Foody, American actor (b. 1928)
- November 29 – Gene Rayburn, American television personality (b. 1917)

=== December ===
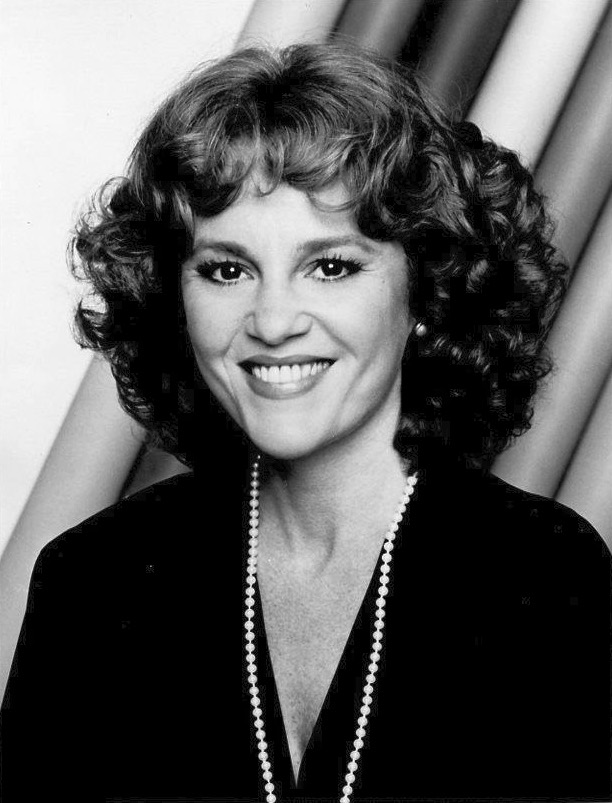
Madeline Kahn

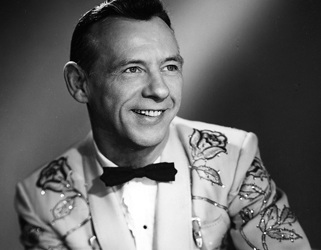
Hank Snow

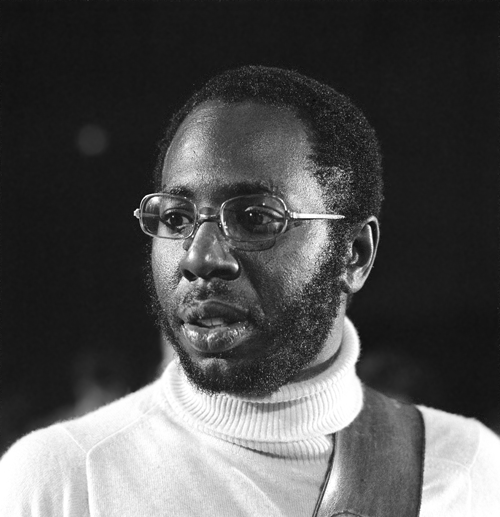
Curtis Mayfield

- December 2
  - Joey Adams, American comedian (b. 1911)
  - Charlie Byrd, American jazz musician and classical guitarist (b. 1925)
- December 3
  - John Archer, American actor (b. 1915)
  - Scatman John, American musician, singer, and songwriter (b. 1942)
  - Madeline Kahn, American actress and singer (b. 1942)
- December 4 – Rose Bird, American activist and judge (b. 1936)
- December 10
  - Rick Danko, Canadian musician (b. 1943)
  - Shirley Hemphill, American comedian and actress (b. 1947)
- December 12
  - Paul Cadmus, American artist (b. 1904)
  - Joseph Heller, American novelist (b. 1923)
- December 17
  - Rex Allen, American actor, singer, and songwriter (b. 1920)
  - Grover Washington, Jr., American saxophonist (b. 1943)
- December 20
  - Irving Rapper, American film director (b. 1898)
  - Hank Snow, Canadian-American country musician (b. 1914)
- December 23 – John P. Davies, American diplomat (b. 1908)
- December 26 – Curtis Mayfield, American musician and composer (b. 1942)
- December 27 – Leonard Goldenson, American television executive (b. 1905)
- December 28 – Clayton Moore, American actor (b. 1914)
- December 30 – Sarah Knauss, American supercentenarian, verified oldest person in the world (b. 1880)
- December 31 – Elliot Richardson, American politician and lawyer (b. 1920)

== See also ==
- 1999 in American soccer
- 1999 in American television
- List of American films of 1999
- Timeline of United States history (1990–2009)
