= Alexis Roland =

American snowboarder (born 1999)

Alexis Roland (born June 13, 1999) is a professional snowboarder from Minnesota, United States. She began snowboarding when she was 5 years old.

== Career ==
Alexis "Lexi" Roland is a snowboarder from Bloomington, Minnesota. Alexis is well known in and outside of the snowboarding world, having been featured on The Today Show, in The New York Times, in ESPN Magazine and starring in several winter-sports movies.

Alexis first gained media attention when a video was posted of her riding on the internet and YouTube. The press dubbed her a "snowboarding phenom," for her high level of skill as a six-year-old in the video. Alexis is now a professional snowboarder and rides for Nitro Snowboards.

Alexis had small parts in two snowboard videos in 2006, including the bonus section of "Ro Sham Bo" by Misschief Films, and "Frozen Assets," by First Tracks Productions.

Alexis has continued filming parts with First Tracks Productions and she was featured in "HELLO my name is" and has full, stand-out parts, in their two latest movies: "Knock on Wood" and "Droppin'". Trailers for these movies can also be viewed on First Tracks Productions's youtube page Alexis was also featured in the 2009 Warren Miller film "Dynasty"
