= 1886 in the United States =

- Decades: 1860s; 1870s; 1880s; 1890s; 1900s
- See also: History of the United States (1865–1918); Timeline of United States history (1860–1899); List of years in the United States

Events from the year 1886 in the United States.

== Incumbents ==
=== Federal government ===
- President: Grover Cleveland (D-New York)
- Vice President: vacant
- Chief Justice: Morrison Waite (Ohio)
- Speaker of the House of Representatives: John G. Carlisle (D-Kentucky)
- Congress: 49th

==== State governments ====
Governors and lieutenant governors

=== Governors ===
- Governor of Alabama: Edward A. O'Neal (Democratic) (until December 1), Thomas Seay (Democratic) (starting December 1)
- Governor of Arkansas: Simon Pollard Hughes, Jr. (Democratic)
- Governor of California: George Stoneman (Republican)
- Governor of Colorado: Benjamin Harrison Eaton (Republican)
- Governor of Connecticut: Henry B. Harrison (Republican)
- Governor of Delaware: Charles C. Stockley (Democratic)
- Governor of Florida: Edward A. Perry (Democratic)
- Governor of Georgia: Henry D. McDaniel (Democratic) (until November 9), John B. Gordon (Democratic) (starting November 9)
- Governor of Illinois: Richard J. Oglesby (Republican)
- Governor of Indiana: Isaac P. Gray (Democratic)
- Governor of Iowa: Buren R. Sherman (Republican) (until January 14), William Larrabee (Republican) (starting January 14)
- Governor of Kansas: John A. Martin (Republican)
- Governor of Kentucky: J. Proctor Knott (Democratic)
- Governor of Louisiana: Samuel D. McEnery (Democratic)
- Governor of Maine: Frederick Robie (Republican)
- Governor of Maryland: Henry Lloyd (Democratic)
- Governor of Massachusetts: George D. Robinson (Republican)
- Governor of Michigan: Russell Alger (Republican)
- Governor of Minnesota: Lucius F. Hubbard (Republican)
- Governor of Mississippi: Robert Lowry (Democratic)
- Governor of Missouri: John S. Marmaduke (Democratic)
- Governor of Nebraska: James W. Dawes (Republican)
- Governor of Nevada: Jewett W. Adams (Democratic)
- Governor of New Hampshire: Moody Currier (Republican)
- Governor of New Jersey: Leon Abbett (Democratic)
- Governor of New York: David B. Hill (Democratic)
- Governor of North Carolina: Alfred Moore Scales (Democratic)
- Governor of Ohio: George Hoadly (Democratic) (until January 11), Joseph B. Foraker (Republican) (starting January 11)
- Governor of Oregon: Z. F. Moody (Republican)
- Governor of Pennsylvania: Robert E. Pattison (Democratic)
- Governor of Rhode Island: George P. Wetmore (Republican)
- Governor of South Carolina:
  - until July 10: Hugh Smith Thompson (Democratic)
  - July 10-November 30: John Calhoun Sheppard (Democratic)
  - starting November 30: John Peter Richardson III (Democratic)
- Governor of Tennessee: William B. Bate (Democratic)
- Governor of Texas: John Ireland (Democratic)
- Governor of Vermont: Samuel E. Pingree (Republican) (until October 7), Ebenezer J. Ormsbee (Republican) (starting October 7)
- Governor of Virginia: William E. Cameron (Re-adjuster) (until January 1), Fitzhugh Lee (Democratic) (starting January 1)
- Governor of West Virginia: Emanuel Willis Wilson (Democratic)
- Governor of Wisconsin: Jeremiah McLain Rusk (Republican)

=== Lieutenant governors ===
- Lieutenant Governor of California: John Daggett (Democratic)
- Lieutenant Governor of Colorado: Peter W. Breene (Republican)
- Lieutenant Governor of Connecticut: Lorrin A. Cooke (Republican)
- Lieutenant Governor of Florida: Milton H. Mabry (Democratic)
- Lieutenant Governor of Illinois: John Smith (Republican)
- Lieutenant Governor of Indiana: Mahlon Dickerson Manson (Democratic) (until August 3), vacant (starting August 3)
- Lieutenant Governor of Iowa: vacant (until January 14), John A. T. Hull (Republican) (starting January 14)
- Lieutenant Governor of Kansas: Alexander P. Riddle (Republican)
- Lieutenant Governor of Kentucky: James R. Hindman (Democratic)
- Lieutenant Governor of Louisiana: Clay Knobloch (Democratic)
- Lieutenant Governor of Massachusetts: Oliver Ames (Democratic)
- Lieutenant Governor of Michigan: Archibald Buttars (Republican)
- Lieutenant Governor of Minnesota: Charles A. Gilman (Republican)
- Lieutenant Governor of Mississippi: G. D. Shands (Democratic)
- Lieutenant Governor of Missouri: Albert P. Morehouse (Democratic)
- Lieutenant Governor of Nebraska: Hibbard H. Shedd (Republican)
- Lieutenant Governor of Nevada: Charles E. Laughton (Republican)
- Lieutenant Governor of New York: Edward F. Jones (Democratic) (starting January 1)
- Lieutenant Governor of North Carolina: Charles M. Stedman (Democratic)
- Lieutenant Governor of Ohio: John George Warwick (Democratic) (starting January 11) Robert P. Kennedy (Republican) (starting January 11)
- Lieutenant Governor of Pennsylvania: Chauncey Forward Black (Democratic)
- Lieutenant Governor of Rhode Island: Lucius B. Darling (political party unknown)
- Lieutenant Governor of South Carolina:
  - until July 10: John Calhoun Sheppard (Democratic)
  - July 10-November 30: vacant
  - starting November 30: William L. Mauldin (Democratic)
- Lieutenant Governor of Tennessee: Cabell R. Berry (Democratic) (until month and day unknown), Z. W. Ewing (Democratic) (starting month and day unknown)
- Lieutenant Governor of Texas: Barnett Gibbs (Democratic)
- Lieutenant Governor of Vermont: Ebenezer J. Ormsbee (Republican) (until October 7), Levi K. Fuller (Republican) (starting October 7)
- Lieutenant Governor of Virginia: John F. Lewis (Republican) (until January 1), John Edward "Parson" Massey (Democratic) (starting January 1)
- Lieutenant Governor of Wisconsin: Sam S. Fifield (Republican) (until January 3), George W. Ryland (Republican) (starting January 3)

== Events ==
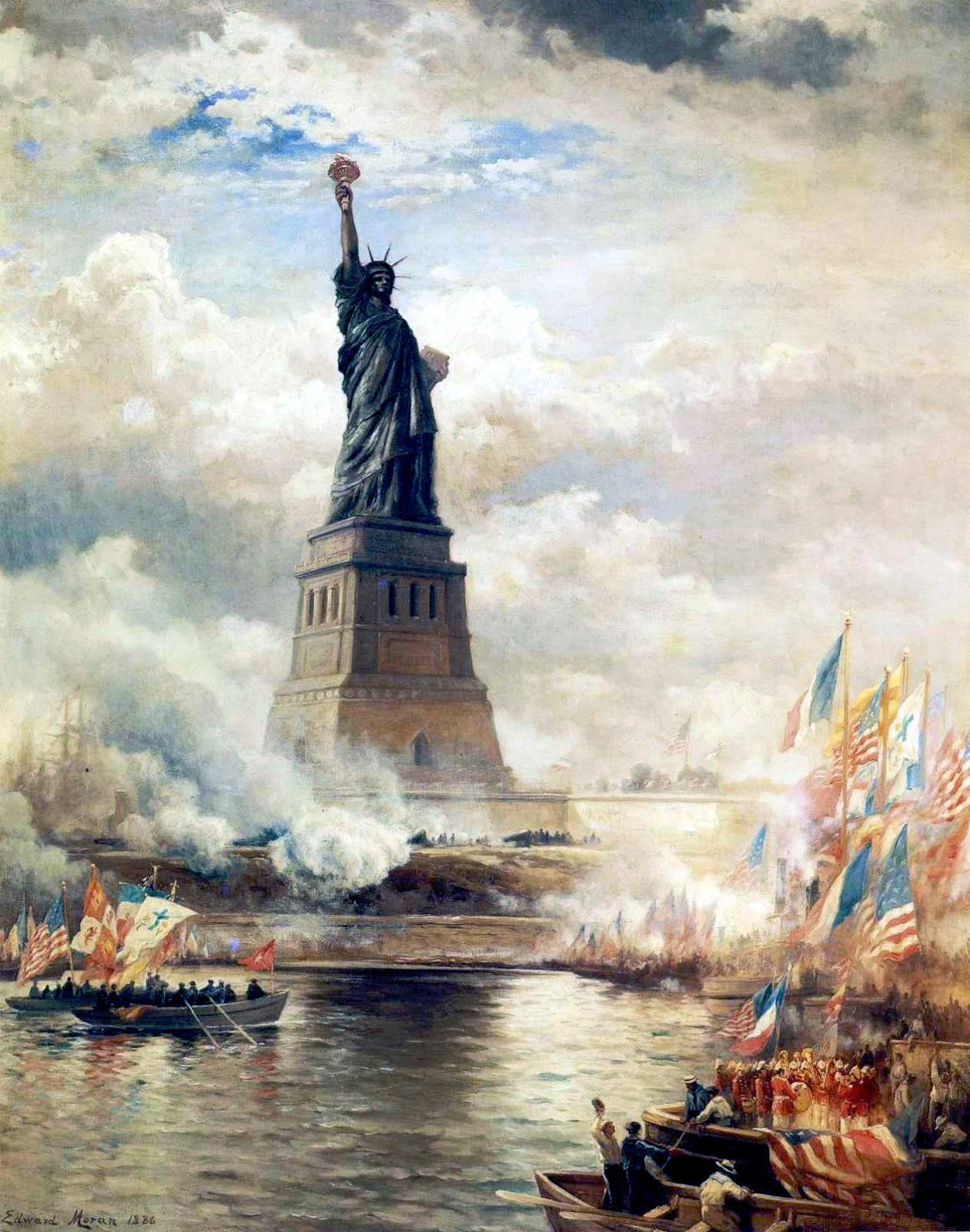
October 28: Statue of Liberty dedicated.

- February 6–9 – Seattle riot of 1886: Anti-Chinese sentiments result in riots in Seattle, Washington.
- March 17 – Carrollton Massacre: 20 African Americans are killed in Mississippi.
- April 24 – Father Augustine Tolton, the first Roman Catholic priest from the U.S. to identify himself publicly as African American, is ordained in Rome.
- May 1 – A general strike begins, which escalates on May 4 into the Haymarket affair in Chicago and eventually wins the eight-hour day for workers.
- May 8 – Pharmacist Dr. John Stith Pemberton invents a carbonated beverage that will be named 'Coca-Cola'.
- May 17 – Santa Clara County v. Southern Pacific Railroad: The U.S. Supreme Court rules that corporations have the same rights as living persons.
- May 29 – Pharmacist John Pemberton begins to advertise Coca-Cola (advertisement in the Atlanta Journal).
- May 31-June 1 – Conversion of all (most) railroads to standard gauge; see Track gauge in the United States
- June 2 – U.S. President Grover Cleveland marries Frances Folsom in the White House, becoming the only president to wed in the executive mansion. She is 27 years his junior.
- June 9 – The Stoughton Musical Society's centennial is celebrated.
- July 23 – Steve Brodie is reported to have made a jump from the Brooklyn Bridge, a claim subsequently disputed.
- August 20 – A massive hurricane demolishes the town of Indianola, Texas.
- August 31 – The 6.9–7.3 M_{w} Charleston earthquake affects southeastern South Carolina with a maximum Mercalli intensity of X (Extreme). Sixty people are killed and damage is estimated at $5–6 million.
- September 4 – Indian Wars: After almost 30 years of fighting, Apache leader Geronimo surrenders with his last band of warriors to General Nelson Miles at Skeleton Canyon in Arizona.
- October 10 – The English style of black tie men's formal evening dress is introduced to the U.S. by James Brown Potter at Tuxedo Park, New York, hence its usual American description as "tux(edo)".
- October 28 – The Statue of Liberty in New York Harbor is dedicated by U.S. President Grover Cleveland.
- Undated – Arthur Hinds & Company, later Barnes & Noble booksellers, is founded in New York City.

=== Ongoing ===
- Gilded Age (1869–c. 1896)

== Sport ==
- October 23 - American Association's St. Louis Browns win the First (Unofficial) 1886 World Series by defeating the National League's Chicago White Stockings 4 games to 2. The final game is played at Sportsman's Park in St. Louis, Missouri

== Births ==
- January 3 – John G. Fletcher, poet and author (died 1950)
- January 11 – Chester Conklin, comic film actor (died 1971)
- January 28 – Sam McDaniel, African-American actor (died 1962)
- February 27 – Hugo Black, U.S. Senator from Alabama from 1927 to 1937 and Associate Justice of the U.S. Supreme Court from 1937 to 1971 (died 1971)
- March 6
  - Jam Handy, swimmer and water polo player (d. 1983)
  - Nella Walker, actress and vaudevillian (d. 1971)
- March 7 – Jessie Coles Grayson, African American contralto and film actress (died 1953)
- March 8 – Edward Calvin Kendall, biochemist, recipient of the Nobel Prize in Physiology or Medicine in 1950 (died 1972)
- March 9 – Robert L. Eichelberger, general (died 1961)
- March 21 – Arthur Grover Rider, painter (died 1975)
- March 24 – Edward Weston, photographer (died 1958)
- April 2 – Reginald Barker, film director (died 1945)
- April 3 – Dooley Wilson, African American drummer, singer and actor (died 1953)
- April 8 – Margaret Ayer Barnes, playwright, novelist and short-story writer (died 1967)
- April 26 – Ma Rainey, born Gertrude Malissa Nix Pridgett, African American blues singer (died 1939)
- May 26 – Al Jolson, entertainer (died 1950)
- June 2 – Grover Whalen, politician (died 1962)
- June 3 – Benjamin McCandlish, Governor of Guam (died 1975)
- June 6
  - Tyler Brooke, actor and singer (died 1943)
  - William A. Glassford, admiral (died 1958)
- June 27
  - Sally Crute, actress (died 1971)
  - Carroll McComas, actress (d. 1962)
- June 29 – Robert C. Giffen, admiral (d. 1962)
- July 15 – Arthur L. Bristol, admiral (d. 1942)
- July 16 – Frank Hastings Griffin, engineer (d. 1974)
- September 11 – John H. Hester, general (d. 1976)
- September 28 – Alice Hollister, silent film actress (d. 1973)
- October 30 – Zoë Akins, dramatist (died 1958)
- November 9
  - Edward Lindberg, Olympic athlete (died 1978)
  - Ed Wynn, actor (died 1966)
- December 5 – Rose Wilder Lane, journalist and libertarian (died 1968)
- December 9 – Clarence Birdseye, founder of the modern frozen food industry (died 1956)
- December 18 – Ty Cobb, baseball outfielder (died 1961)
- December 19 – Charles M. Cooke, Jr., admiral (died 1970)
- December 25 – Kid Ory, jazz trombonist and bandleader (died 1973)

== Deaths ==
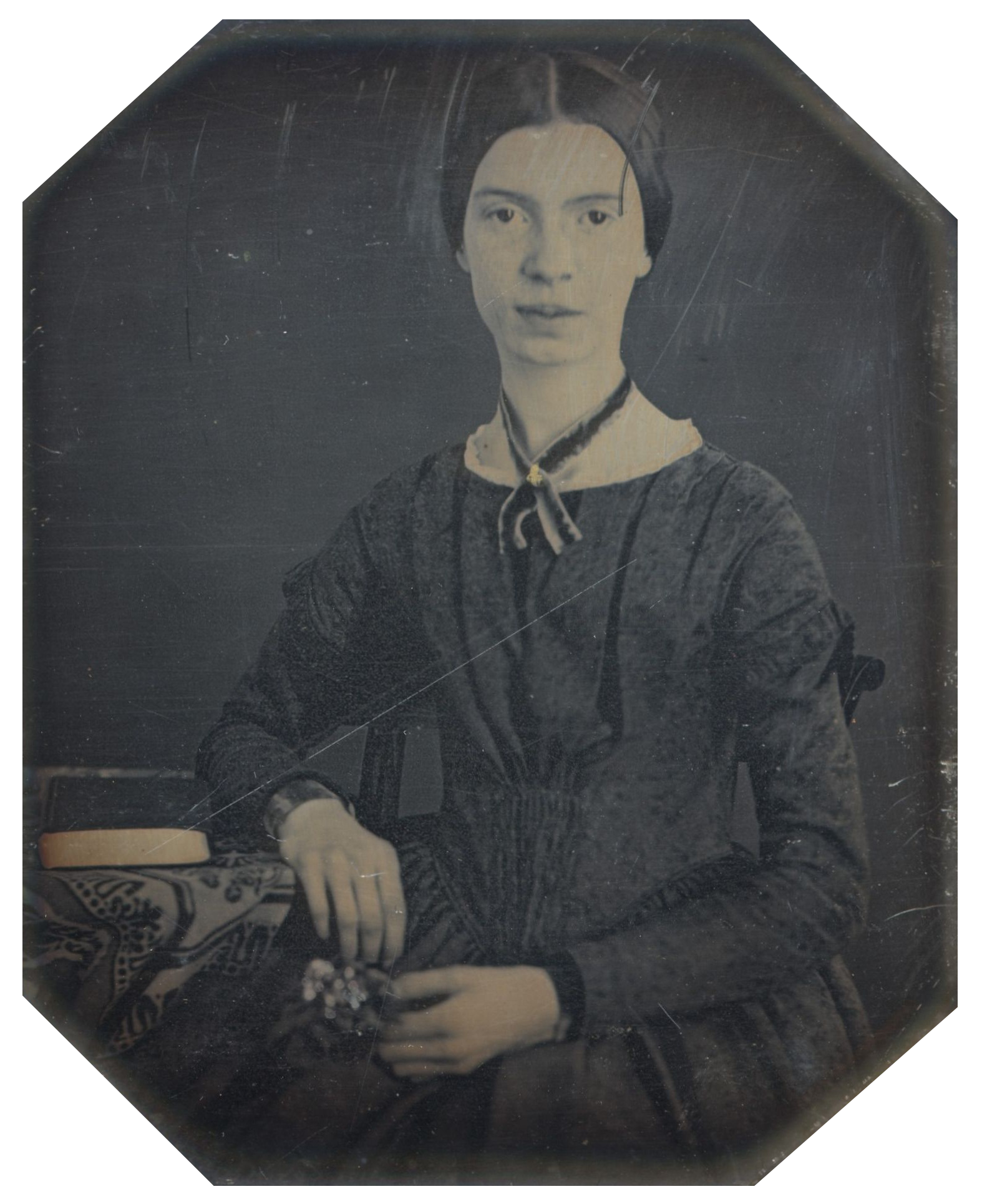
Emily Dickinson

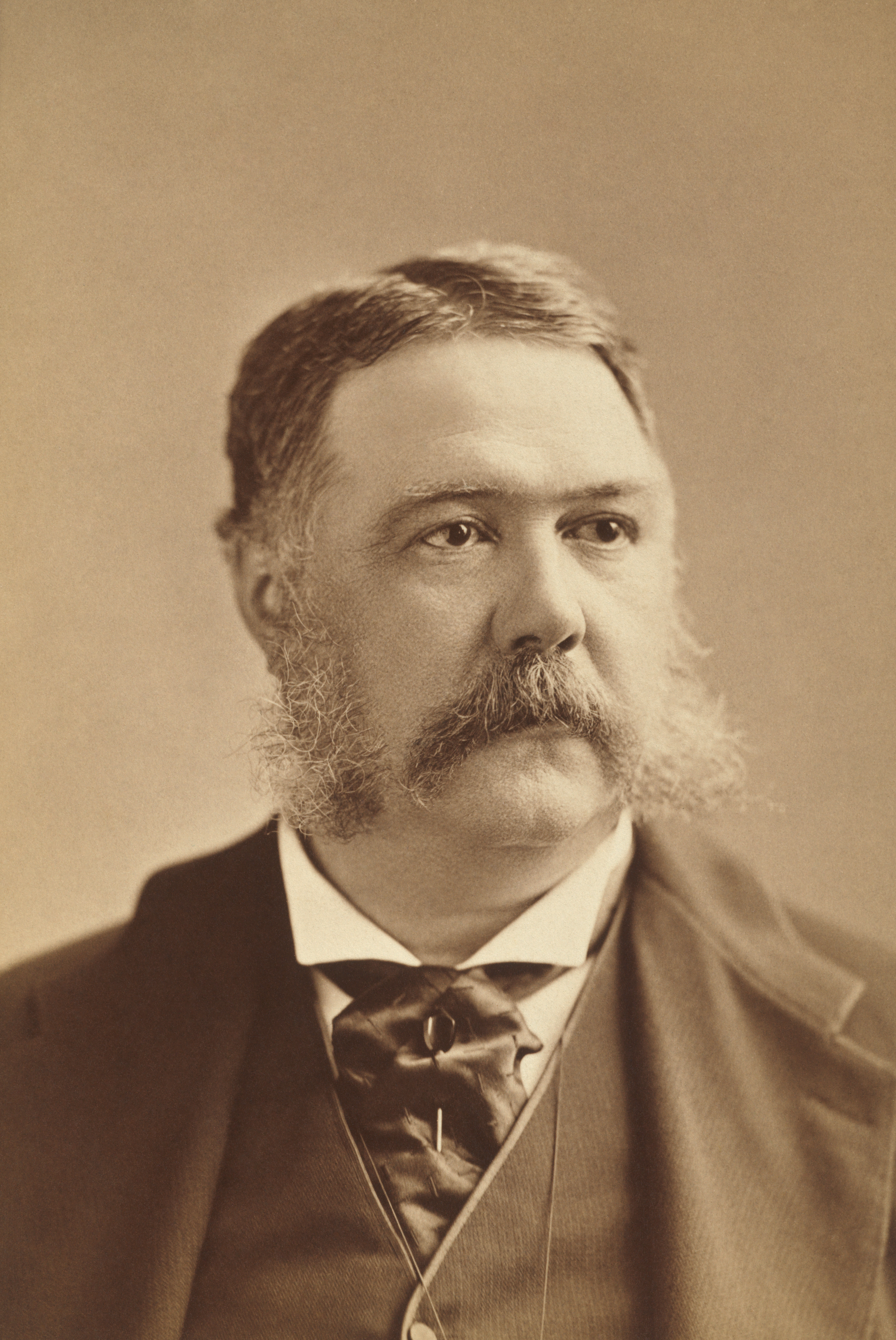
Chester A. Arthur

- January 13 – Thomas Wakeman, founder of the first Sioux Indian YMCA (born 1846)
- January 22 – James T. Farley, U.S. Senator from California from 1879 to 1885. (born 1829)
- January 26 – David Rice Atchison, U.S. Senator from Missouri from 1844 to 1855 (born 1807)
- February 2 – David Hunter, Union Army general (born 1802)
- February 9 – Winfield Scott Hancock, Civil War Union general and political candidate (born 1824)
- February 12 – Horatio Seymour, 18th governor of New York, Democratic Party nominee for President of the United States in the presidential election of 1868 (born 1810)
- March 8 – John Franklin Miller, U.S. Senator from California from 1881 to 1886 (born 1831)
- March 9 – Jerome B. Chaffee, U.S. Senator from Colorado from 1876 to 1879 (born 1825)
- March 13 – Austin Flint, co-founder of Buffalo Medical College and president of the American Medical Association (born 1812)
- April 3 – Arthur Pember, journalist, first president of The Football Association (born 1835 in the United Kingdom)
- April 27 – H. H. Richardson, architect (born 1838)
- May 15 – Emily Dickinson, poet (born 1830)
- May 21 – Stephen Pearl Andrews, anarchist and proponent of pantarchy (born 1812)
- June 26 – David Davis, U.S. Senator from Illinois from 1877 to 1883 (born 1815)
- July 16 – Ned Buntline (Edward Zane Carroll Judson Sr.), publisher, dime novelist and publicist (born 1821)
- August 4 – Samuel J. Tilden, 25th Governor of New York from 1875 to 1876 and 1876 Democratic presidential candidate (born 1814)
- August 5 – Robert Allen, Union army brigadier general (born 1811)
- August 10 – John W. Stevenson, U.S. Senator from Kentucky from 1871 to 1877 (born 1812)
- August 30 – Ferris Jacobs, Jr., politician (born 1836)
- October 10 – David Levy Yulee, U.S. Senator from Florida from 1845 to 1851 and from 1855 to 1861 (born 1810)
- November 18 – Chester A. Arthur, 21st president of the United States from 1881 to 1885, 20th vice president of the United States from March to September 1881 (born 1829)
- November 21 – Charles Francis Adams Sr., United States Minister to the United Kingdom, son of John Quincy Adams (born 1807)
- December 26 – John A. Logan, U.S. Senator from Illinois from 1871 to 1877 (born 1826)

== See also ==
- Timeline of United States history (1860–1899)
