= 1887 in the United States =

- Decades: 1860s; 1870s; 1880s; 1890s; 1900s
- See also: History of the United States (1865–1918); Timeline of United States history (1860–1899); List of years in the United States

Events from the year 1887 in the United States.

== Incumbents ==
=== Federal government ===
- President: Grover Cleveland (D-New York)
- Vice President: vacant
- Chief Justice: Morrison Waite (Ohio)
- Speaker of the House of Representatives: John G. Carlisle (D-Kentucky)
- Congress: 49th (until March 4), 50th (starting March 4)

==== State governments ====
Governors and lieutenant governors

=== Governors ===
- Governor of Alabama: Thomas Seay (Democratic)
- Governor of Arkansas: Simon Pollard Hughes, Jr. (Democratic)
- Governor of California:
  - until January 8: George Stoneman (Republican)
  - January 8-September 12: Washington Bartlett (Democratic)
  - starting September 12: Robert Waterman (Republican)
- Governor of Colorado: Benjamin Harrison Eaton (Republican) (until January 11), Alva Adams (Democratic) (starting January 11)
- Governor of Connecticut: Henry B. Harrison (Republican) (until January 7), Phineas C. Lounsbury (Republican) (starting January 7)
- Governor of Delaware: Charles C. Stockley (Democratic) (until January 18), Benjamin T. Biggs (Democratic) (starting January 18)
- Governor of Florida: Edward A. Perry (Democratic)
- Governor of Georgia: John B. Gordon (Democratic)
- Governor of Illinois: Richard J. Oglesby (Republican)
- Governor of Indiana: Isaac P. Gray (Democratic)
- Governor of Iowa: William Larrabee (Republican)
- Governor of Kansas: John A. Martin (Republican)
- Governor of Kentucky: J. Proctor Knott (Democratic) (until August 30), Simon B. Buckner (Democratic) (starting August 30)
- Governor of Louisiana: Samuel D. McEnery (Democratic)
- Governor of Maine:
  - until January 5: Frederick Robie (Republican)
  - January 5-December 15: Joseph R. Bodwell (Republican)
  - starting December 15: Sebastian Streeter Marble (Republican)
- Governor of Maryland: Henry Lloyd (Democratic)
- Governor of Massachusetts: George D. Robinson (Republican) (until January 6), Oliver Ames (Republican) (starting January 6)
- Governor of Michigan: Russell Alger (Republican) (until January 1), Cyrus G. Luce (Republican) (starting January 1)
- Governor of Minnesota: Lucius F. Hubbard (Republican) (until January 5), Andrew R. McGill (Republican) (starting January 5)
- Governor of Mississippi: Robert Lowry (Democratic)
- Governor of Missouri: John S. Marmaduke (Democratic) (until December 28), Albert P. Morehouse (Democratic) (starting December 28)
- Governor of Nebraska: James W. Dawes (Republican) (until January 6), John Milton Thayer (Republican) (starting January 6)
- Governor of Nevada: Jewett W. Adams (Democratic) (until January 3), Charles C. Stevenson (Democratic) (starting January 3)
- Governor of New Hampshire: Moody Currier (Republican) (until June 2), Charles H. Sawyer (Democratic) (starting June 2)
- Governor of New Jersey: Leon Abbett (Democratic) (until January 18), Robert Stockton Green (Democratic) (starting January 18)
- Governor of New York: David B. Hill (Democratic)
- Governor of North Carolina: Alfred Moore Scales (Democratic)
- Governor of Ohio: Joseph B. Foraker (Republican)
- Governor of Oregon: Z. F. Moody (Republican) (until January 12), Sylvester Pennoyer (Democratic) (starting January 12)
- Governor of Pennsylvania: Robert E. Pattison (Democratic) (until January 18), James A. Beaver (Republican) (starting January 18)
- Governor of Rhode Island: George P. Wetmore (Republican) (until May 29), John W. Davis (Democratic) (starting May 29)
- Governor of South Carolina: John Peter Richardson III (Democratic)
- Governor of Tennessee: William B. Bate (Democratic) (until January 17), Robert Love Taylor (Democratic) (starting January 17)
- Governor of Texas: John Ireland (Democratic) (until January 20), Lawrence Sullivan Ross (Democratic) (starting January 20)
- Governor of Vermont: Ebenezer J. Ormsbee (Republican)
- Governor of Virginia: Fitzhugh Lee (Democratic)
- Governor of West Virginia: Emanuel Willis Wilson (Democratic)
- Governor of Wisconsin: Jeremiah McLain Rusk (Republican)

=== Lieutenant governors ===
- Lieutenant Governor of California:
  - until January 8: John Daggett (Democratic)
  - January 8-September 13: Robert Whitney Waterman (Republican)
  - starting September 13: Stephen M. White (Democratic)
- Lieutenant Governor of Colorado: Peter W. Breene (Republican) (until January 11), Norman H. Meldrum (Democratic) (starting January 11)
- Lieutenant Governor of Connecticut: Lorrin A. Cooke (Republican) (until January 8), James L. Howard (Republican) (starting January 8)
- Lieutenant Governor of Florida: Milton H. Mabry (Democratic)
- Lieutenant Governor of Illinois: John Smith (Republican)
- Lieutenant Governor of Indiana: vacant (until January 10), Robert S. Robertson/Alonzo G. Smith (Republican/Democratic) (starting January 10)
- Lieutenant Governor of Iowa: John A. T. Hull (Republican)
- Lieutenant Governor of Kansas: Alexander P. Riddle (Republican)
- Lieutenant Governor of Kentucky: James R. Hindman (Democratic) (until August 30), James William Bryan (Democratic) (starting August 30)
- Lieutenant Governor of Louisiana: Clay Knobloch (Democratic)
- Lieutenant Governor of Massachusetts: Oliver Ames (Republican) (until January 4), John Q. A. Brackett (political party unknown) (starting January 4)
- Lieutenant Governor of Michigan: Archibald Buttars (Republican) (until month and day unknown), James H. MacDonald (Republican) (starting month and day unknown)
- Lieutenant Governor of Minnesota: Charles A. Gilman (Republican) (until January 4), Albert E. Rice (Republican) (starting January 4)
- Lieutenant Governor of Mississippi: G. D. Shands (Democratic)
- Lieutenant Governor of Missouri: Albert P. Morehouse (Democratic) (until December 28), vacant (starting December 28)
- Lieutenant Governor of Nebraska: Hibbard H. Shedd (Republican)
- Lieutenant Governor of Nevada: Charles E. Laughton (Republican) (until month and day unknown), Henry C. Davis (political party unknown) (starting month and day unknown)
- Lieutenant Governor of New York: Edward F. Jones (Democratic)
- Lieutenant Governor of North Carolina: Charles M. Stedman (Democratic)
- Lieutenant Governor of Ohio: Robert P. Kennedy (Republican) (until March 3), Silas A. Conrad (Republican) (starting March 3)
- Lieutenant Governor of Pennsylvania: Chauncey Forward Black (Democratic) (until January 20), William T. Davies (Republican) (starting January 20)
- Lieutenant Governor of Rhode Island: Lucius B. Darling (political party unknown) (until May 29), Samuel R. Honey (political party unknown) (starting May 29)
- Lieutenant Governor of South Carolina: William L. Mauldin (Democratic)
- Lieutenant Governor of Tennessee: Cabell R. Berry (Democratic) (until month and day unknown), Z. W. Ewing (political party unknown) (starting month and day unknown)
- Lieutenant Governor of Texas: Barnett Gibbs (Democratic) (until January 18), Thomas B. Wheeler (Democratic) (starting January 18)
- Lieutenant Governor of Vermont: Levi K. Fuller (Republican)
- Lieutenant Governor of Virginia: John Edward "Parson" Massey (Democratic)
- Lieutenant Governor of Wisconsin: Sam S. Fifield (Republican) (until January 3), George W. Ryland (Republican) (starting January 3)

== Events ==
- January 20 – The United States Senate allows the Navy to lease Pearl Harbor in Hawaii as a naval base.
- January 28 – In a snowstorm at Fort Keogh, Montana, the largest snowflakes on record are reported. They are 15 inches (38 cm) wide and 8 inches (20 cm) thick.
- February 2 – In Punxsutawney, Pennsylvania, the first Groundhog Day is observed.
- February 4 – The Interstate Commerce Act, passed by Congress, is signed into law, with the intention of regulating the railroad industry.
- February 8 – The Dawes Act is signed into law by President Grover Cleveland.
- February 26 – Troy University is established as Troy State Normal School; an institution to train teachers for Alabama's schools.
- February – The Atlanta Cyclorama is first displayed in Detroit as "Logan's Great Battle".
- March 3 – Anne Sullivan begins teaching Helen Keller.
- March 7 – North Carolina State University is established as North Carolina College of Agriculture and Mechanic Arts.
- March 19 – Cogswell College is established as a high school by Dr. Henry D. Cogswell in San Francisco, the first technical training institution in the West (the school opens in 1888).
- April 4 – Argonia, Kansas elects Susanna M. Salter as the first female mayor in the U.S.
- May 14 – The cornerstone of the new Stanford University, in northern California, is laid (the college opens in 1891).
- June 28 – Minot, North Dakota is incorporated as a city.
- July 10 – The Grand Hotel opens in Mackinac, Michigan.
- August – The U.S. National Institutes of Health is founded at the Marine Hospital, Staten Island, New York, as the Laboratory of Hygiene.
- October 3 – Florida A&M University is founded as The State Normal College for Colored Students in Tallahassee, Florida.
- October 14 – Pomona College is founded in Claremont, California.

=== Undated ===
- Ruby Mining District (Salmon Creek District) is established in Washington state.
- Teachers College, later part of Columbia University, is founded by Grace Hoadley Dodge as the New York School for the Training of Teachers; Nicholas Murray Butler is its first president.

=== Ongoing ===
- Gilded Age (1869–c. 1896)

== Sport ==
- September 28 – The Detroit Wolverines win the National League pennant with a 7–3 victory over the Indianapolis Hoosiers.
- November 24 – Yale wins the Consensus College Football National Championship

== Births ==
- January 22
  - David W. Stewart, U.S. Senator from Iowa from 1926 to 1927 (died 1974)
  - Elmer Fowler Stone, first United States Coast Guard aviator (died 1936)
- February 6 – Ernest Gruening, U.S. Senator from Alaska from 1959 to 1969 (died 1974)
- February 7 – Eubie Blake, African American jazz composer-pianist (died 1983)
- February 11 – H. Kent Hewitt, admiral (died 1972)
- February 26
  - Grover Cleveland Alexander, baseball player (died 1950)
  - William Frawley, actor best known for played Fred Mertz in I Love Lucy (died 1966)
- March 4 – Violet MacMillan, Broadway theater actress (died 1953)
- March 5 – Harry Turner, American football player (died 1914)
- March 14 – Charles Reisner, silent actor and film director (died 1962)
- March 22 – Chico Marx, comedian (died 1961)
- April 9 – Florence Price, African American classical composer (died 1953)
- April 15 – Mike Brady, golfer (died 1972)
- June 25 – George Abbott, producer and director (died 1995)
- July 16 – Shoeless Joe Jackson, baseball outfielder (died 1951)
- July 31 – Peter Bocage, jazz musician (died 1967)
- August 27 – Julia Sanderson, actress (died 1975)
- September 3 – Frank Christian, jazz musician (died 1973)
- September 8 – Jacob L. Devers, U.S. Army general (died 1979)
- September 9 – Alf Landon, Republican politician, presidential candidate (died 1987)
- September 13 – Frank Gray, physicist and researcher, known for the Gray code (died 1969)
- September 28 – Avery Brundage, 5th president of the International Olympic Committee (died 1975)
- September 29 – Annie Dove Denmark, music educator and academic administrator (died 1974)
- November 15 – Georgia O'Keeffe, painter (died 1986)
- December 19 – George R. Swift, U.S. Senator from Alabama in 1946 (died 1972)
- date unknown – White Parker, missionary and actor (died 1956)

== Deaths ==
- January 7 – Aaron Shaw, U.S. Representative from Illinois (born 1811)
- March 8 – Henry Ward Beecher, clergyman and reformer (born 1813)
- March 24 – Justin Holland, classical guitarist and civil rights activist (born 1819)
- May 14
  - Lysander Spooner, philosopher and abolitionist (born 1808)
  - William Burnham Woods, Supreme Court justice and politician (born 1824)
- May 19 – Charles E. Stuart, U.S. Senator from Michigan from 1853 to 1859 (born 1810)
- June 4 – William A. Wheeler, 19th vice president of the United States from 1877 to 1881 (born 1819)
- June 25 – James Speed, U.S. Attorney General from 1864 to 1866 under Presidents Abraham Lincoln and Andrew Johnson (born 1812)
- July 18
  - Dorothea Dix, mental health reformer (born 1802)
  - Robert M. T. Hunter, Virginian lawyer, politician, 14th Speaker of the United States House of Representatives, 2nd Confederate States Secretary of State (born 1809)
- July 25 – John Taylor, 3rd president of the Church of Jesus Christ of Latter-day Saints (born 1808)
- August 14 – Aaron A. Sargent, U.S. Senator from California from 1873 to 1879 (born 1827)
- August 18 – Orson Squire Fowler, phrenologist and leading proponent of the octagon house (born 1809)
- August 23 – Sarah Yorke Jackson, Acting First Lady of the United States (born 1803)
- November 8 – Doc Holliday, gunfighter, gambler and dentist (TB; born 1851)
- November 11 – August Spies, labor activist, newspaper editor and anarchist (executed; born 1855 in Germany)
- December 24 – Daniel Manning, businessman, journalist and politician, Secretary of the Treasury (born 1831)

== See also ==
- Timeline of United States history (1860–1899)
