= 1883 in the United States =

- Decades: 1860s; 1870s; 1880s; 1890s; 1900s
- See also: History of the United States (1865–1918); Timeline of United States history (1860–1899); List of years in the United States

Events from the year 1883 in the United States.

== Incumbents ==
=== Federal government ===
- President: Chester A. Arthur (R-New York)
- Vice President: vacant
- Chief Justice: Morrison Waite (Ohio)
- Speaker of the House of Representatives:

J. Warren Keifer (R-Ohio) (until March 4)
John G. Carlisle (D-Kentucky) (starting December 3)

- Congress: 47th (until March 4), 48th (starting March 4)

==== State governments ====
Governors and lieutenant governors

=== Governors ===
- Governor of Alabama: Edward A. O'Neal (Democratic)
- Governor of Arkansas: Thomas James Churchill (Democratic) (until January 13), James Henderson Berry (Democratic) (starting January 13)
- Governor of California: George Clement Perkins (Republican) (until January 10), George Stoneman (Republican) (starting January 10)
- Governor of Colorado: Frederick Walker Pitkin (Republican) (until January 9), James Benton Grant (Democratic) (starting January 9)
- Governor of Connecticut: Hobart B. Bigelow (Republican) (until January 3), Thomas M. Waller (Democratic) (starting January 3)
- Governor of Delaware: John W. Hall (Democratic) (until January 16), Charles C. Stockley (Democratic) (starting January 16)
- Governor of Florida: William D. Bloxham (Democratic)
- Governor of Georgia:
  - until March 4: Alexander H. Stephens (Democratic)
  - March 4-May 10: James S. Boynton (Democratic)
  - starting May 10: Henry D. McDaniel (Democratic)
- Governor of Illinois: Shelby Moore Cullom (Republican) (until February 16), John Marshall Hamilton (Republican) (starting February 16)
- Governor of Indiana: Albert G. Porter (Republican)
- Governor of Iowa: Buren R. Sherman (Republican)
- Governor of Kansas: John P. St. John (Republican) (until January 8), George W. Glick (Democratic) (starting January 8)
- Governor of Kentucky: Luke P. Blackburn (Democratic) (until September 5), J. Proctor Knott (Democratic) (starting September 5)
- Governor of Louisiana: Samuel D. McEnery (Democratic)
- Governor of Maine: Harris M. Plaisted (Democratic) (until January 3), Frederick Robie (Republican) (starting January 3)
- Governor of Maryland: William T. Hamilton (Democratic)
- Governor of Massachusetts: John Davis Long (Republican) (until January 4), Benjamin F. Butler (Democratic) (starting January 4)
- Governor of Michigan: David Jerome (Republican) (until January 1), Josiah Begole (Democratic) (starting January 1)
- Governor of Minnesota: Lucius F. Hubbard (Republican)
- Governor of Mississippi: Robert Lowry (Democratic)
- Governor of Missouri: Thomas Theodore Crittenden (Democratic)
- Governor of Nebraska: Albinus Nance (Republican) (until January 4), James W. Dawes (Republican) (starting January 4)
- Governor of Nevada: John Henry Kinkead (Republican) (until January 1), Jewett W. Adams (Democratic) (starting January 1)
- Governor of New Hampshire: Charles H. Bell (Republican) (until June 7), Samuel W. Hale (Republican) (starting June 7)
- Governor of New Jersey: George C. Ludlow (Democratic)
- Governor of New York: Grover Cleveland (Democratic) (starting January 1)
- Governor of North Carolina: Thomas Jordan Jarvis (Democratic)
- Governor of Ohio: Charles Foster (Republican)
- Governor of Oregon: Z. F. Moody (Republican)
- Governor of Pennsylvania: Henry M. Hoyt (Republican) (until January 16), Robert E. Pattison (Democratic) (starting January 16)
- Governor of Rhode Island: Alfred H. Littlefield (Republican) (until May 29), Augustus O. Bourn (Republican) (starting May 29)
- Governor of South Carolina: Hugh Smith Thompson (Democratic)
- Governor of Tennessee: Alvin Hawkins (Republican) (until January 15), William B. Bate (Democratic) (starting January 15)
- Governor of Texas: Oran M. Roberts (Democratic) (until January 16), John Ireland (Democratic) (starting January 16)
- Governor of Vermont: John L. Barstow (Republican)
- Governor of Virginia: William E. Cameron (Re-adjuster)
- Governor of West Virginia: Jacob B. Jackson (Democratic)
- Governor of Wisconsin: Jeremiah McLain Rusk (Republican)

=== Lieutenant governors ===
- Lieutenant Governor of California: John Mansfield (Republican) (until January 10), John Daggett (Democratic) (starting January 10)
- Lieutenant Governor of Colorado: Horace Austin Warner Tabor (Republican) (until January 9), William H. Meyer (Republican) (starting January 9)
- Lieutenant Governor of Connecticut: William H. Bulkeley (Republican) (until January 3), George G. Sumner (Democratic) (starting January 3)
- Lieutenant Governor of Florida: Livingston W. Bethel (no political party)
- Lieutenant Governor of Illinois: John Marshall Hamilton (Republican) (until February 6), William J. Campbell (Republican) (starting month and day unknown)
- Lieutenant Governor of Indiana: Thomas Hanna (Republican)
- Lieutenant Governor of Iowa: Orlando H. Manning (Republican)
- Lieutenant Governor of Kansas: David Wesley Finney (Republican)
- Lieutenant Governor of Kentucky: James E. Cantrill (Democratic) (until September 5), James R. Hindman (Democratic) (starting September 5)
- Lieutenant Governor of Louisiana: vacant
- Lieutenant Governor of Massachusetts: Byron Weston (Republican) (until January 4), Oliver Ames (Republican) (starting January 4)
- Lieutenant Governor of Michigan: Moreau S. Crosby (Republican)
- Lieutenant Governor of Minnesota: Charles A. Gilman (Republican)
- Lieutenant Governor of Mississippi: G. D. Shands (Democratic)
- Lieutenant Governor of Missouri: Robert Alexander Campbell (Democratic)
- Lieutenant Governor of Nebraska: Edmund C. Carns (Republican) (until January 4), Alfred W. Agee (Republican) (starting January 4)
- Lieutenant Governor of Nevada: Jewett W. Adams (Democratic) (until month and day unknown), Charles E. Laughton (Republican) (starting month and day unknown)
- Lieutenant Governor of New York: David B. Hill (Republican) (starting January 1)
- Lieutenant Governor of North Carolina: James L. Robinson (Democratic)
- Lieutenant Governor of Ohio: Rees G. Richards (Republican)
- Lieutenant Governor of Pennsylvania: Charles Warren Stone (Republican) (until January 16), Chauncey Forward Black (Democratic) (starting January 16)
- Lieutenant Governor of Rhode Island: Henry Fay (political party unknown) (until May 29), Oscar Rathbun (political party unknown) (starting May 29)
- Lieutenant Governor of South Carolina: John Calhoun Sheppard (Democratic)
- Lieutenant Governor of Tennessee: George H. Morgan (Democratic) (until month and day unknown), Benjamin F. Alexander (Democratic) (starting month and day unknown)
- Lieutenant Governor of Texas: Leonidas J. Storey (Democratic) (until January 16), Francis M. Martin (Democratic) (starting January 16)
- Lieutenant Governor of Vermont: Samuel E. Pingree (Republican)
- Lieutenant Governor of Virginia: John F. Lewis (Republican)
- Lieutenant Governor of Wisconsin: Sam S. Fifield (Republican)

== Events ==
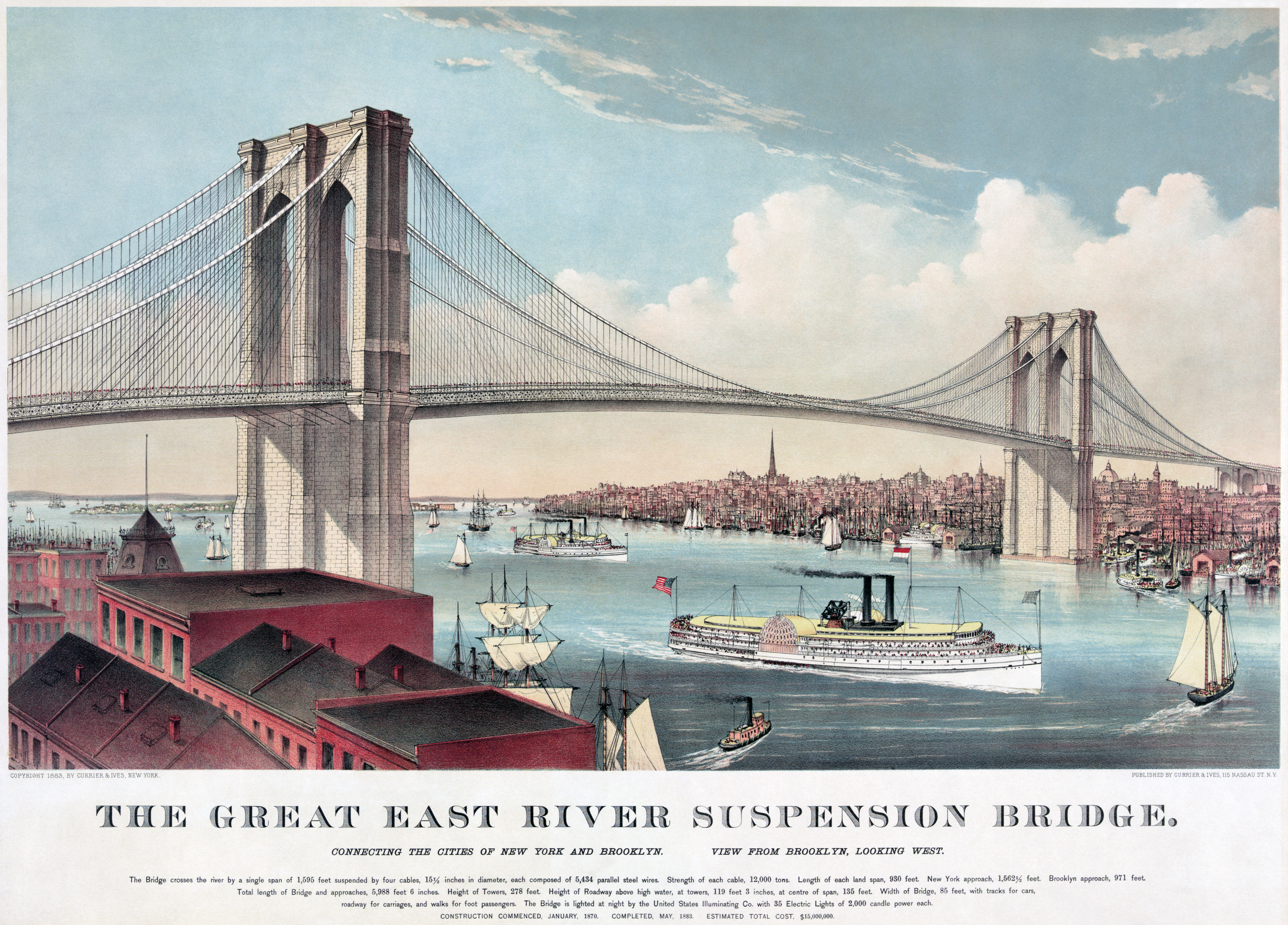
May 24: Brooklyn Bridge opens.

=== January–March ===
- January 10 – A fire at the Newhall Hotel in Milwaukee kills 73 people.
- January 16 – The Pendleton Civil Service Reform Act, reforming the United States civil service with the aim to end the spoils system, becomes law.
- January 19 – The first electric lighting system employing overhead wires begins service in Roselle, New Jersey (it was built by Thomas Edison).
- February 23 – Alabama becomes the first U.S. state to enact an antitrust law.
- February 28 – The first vaudeville theater is opened, in Boston, Massachusetts.
- March
  - Congress authorizes first steel vessels in the United States Navy.
  - Susan Hayhurst becomes first woman to get a pharmacy degree in the United States.

=== April–June ===
- April 13 – In Colorado, prospector Alferd Packer convicted of manslaughter after being accused of cannibalism.
- April 30 – New York Governor Grover Cleveland signs a bill authorizing protection of land for Niagara Falls State Park, which would eventually lead to the Niagara Reservation being established two years later in 1885.
- May 19 – Buffalo Bill's Wild West Show debuts In Omaha Nebraska
- May 24 – Brooklyn Bridge is opened to traffic after 13 years of construction.
- May 30 – In New York City, a rumor that the Brooklyn Bridge is going to collapse causes a stampede which crushes 12 people.

=== July–September ===
- August – Senator George Vest, along with President Chester A. Arthur, with cabinet members, begin a fishing trip to Yellowstone Park for two weeks, becoming the first sitting president to visit the park, and bringing national attention to Yellowstone.
- August 1 – President Chester A. Arthur opens the first Southern Exposition In Louisville.
- September 5 – Mary F. Hoyt becomes the first woman appointed to the U.S. federal civil service (and the second person appointed by examination (in which she came top) instituted under the Pendleton Civil Service Reform Act) when she becomes a clerk in the Bank Redemption Agency of the Department of the Treasury.
- September 15 – The University of Texas at Austin opens to students.
- September 29 – A consortium of flour mill operators in Minneapolis, Minnesota, forms the Minneapolis, St. Paul and Sault Ste. Marie Railroad as a means to get their product to the Great Lakes ports but avoid the high tariffs of Chicago.

=== October–December ===
- October 15 – The Supreme Court of the United States declares part of the Civil Rights Act of 1875 to be unconstitutional, since the Court allows private individuals and corporations to discriminate based on race.
- November 3
  - American Old West: Self-described "Black Bart the Po-et" gets away with his last stagecoach robbery, but leaves an incriminating clue that eventually leads to his capture.
  - Danville Massacre: Race riots in Danville, Virginia kill 4 black Americans.
- November 18 – U.S. and Canadian railroads institute 5 standard continental time zones, ending the confusion of thousands of local times.
- November 28 – Whitman College is chartered as a 4-year college in Walla Walla, Washington.

=== Undated ===
- The Wolf's Head Society (known as The Third Society until 1888) is founded at Yale University.
- Duncan, Arizona is founded.
- A depression starts in Seattle, Washington, United States.
- The Capital Area Humane Society of Ohio is founded.
- Bernard Kroger establishes the first Kroger grocery store, in Cincinnati, Ohio.

=== Ongoing ===
- Gilded Age (1869–c. 1896)
- Depression of 1882–85 (1882–1885)

== Sport ==
- September 27 – The Boston Red Stockings clinch their First National League pennant with a 4–1 win over the Cleveland Blues.

== Births ==
- January 10
  - Francis X. Bushman, screen actor (died 1966)
  - Florence Reed, actress (died 1967)
- January 19 – Waite Phillips, businessman and philanthropist (died 1964)
- January 20 – Enoch L. Johnson, political boss and racketeer (died 1968)
- January 25 – Homer Bone, U.S. Senator from Washington from 1933 to 1944 (died 1970)
- January 30 – Eddie Collins, vaudeville-veteran comic (died 1940)
- March 3 – Edwin Carewe, Native American director (died 1940)
- March 19 – Joseph Stilwell, general (died 1946)
- April 2 – Pearl Doles Bell, film scenarist, novelist and editor (died 1968)
- April 3 – Walter Walker, U.S. Senator from Colorado in 1932 (died 1956)
- April 12 – Imogen Cunningham, photographer (died 1976)
- May 22 – Jane Grey, actress (died 1944)
- May 23 – Douglas Fairbanks, swashbuckling silent film actor (died 1939)
- June 7 – Sylvanus Morley, Mayanist (died 1948)
- June 21 – Richard Remer, athlete (died 1973)
- June 25 – Paul Bartholomew, architect (died 1973)
- June 26 – Mary van Kleeck, labor activist (died 1972)
- July 4 – Rube Goldberg, cartoonist, sculptor, author, engineer and inventor (died 1970)
- July 24 – Nelle Wilson Reagan, mother of United States President Ronald Reagan (d. 1962)
- August 18 – Sidney Hatch, athlete (died 1966)
- September 5 – Mel Sheppard, athlete (died 1942)
- September 19 – Mabel Vernon, suffragist (died 1975)
- November 8 – Charles Demuth, painter (died 1935)
- November 25 – Merrill C. Meigs, newspaper publisher and aviation promoter (died 1968)
- November 26 – Belle da Costa Greene, librarian (died 1950)
- December 19 – Barry Byrne, architect (died 1967)
- December 22 – Edna Goodrich, actress (died 1972)
- December 31 – Leo Otis Colbert, admiral and engineer, director of the United States Coast and Geodetic Survey (died 1968)

== Deaths ==
- January 10 – Samuel Mudd, physician imprisoned for conspiring with John Wilkes Booth in the assassination of Abraham Lincoln (born 1833)
- January 12 – Clark Mills, sculptor (born 1810)
- January 13 – Webster Wagner, inventor, manufacturer and politician (born 1817)
- February 16 – Stephen P. Hempstead, 2nd Governor of Iowa from 1850 to 1854 (born 1812)
- March 4 – Alexander H. Stephens, only vice president of the Confederate States of America (born 1812)
- March 15 – Henry C. Wayne, U.S. Army officer, Confederate brigadier general (born 1815)
- March 26 – Joseph Saberton, U.S. Army private, Union Army (born 1830)
- March 28 – Napoleon Bonaparte Buford, general and railroad executive (born 1807)
- April 4 – Peter Cooper, industrialist, inventor, philanthropist and candidate for President of the U.S. (born 1791)
- April 6 – Benjamin Wright Raymond, politician, twice mayor of Chicago (born 1801)
- April 28 – William M. Browne, politician and newsman, Acting Confederate States Secretary of State in 1862 (born 1823 in Ireland)
- May 15 – Josiah Gorgas, Northern-born Confederate general (born 1818)
- June 14
  - Charles Timothy Brooks, poet and translator (born 1813)
  - Eugene Casserly, U.S. Senator from California from 1869 to 1873 (born 1820)
- July 15 – General Tom Thumb, dwarf performer (born 1838)
- July 22 – Edward Ord, engineer and U.S. Army officer who saw action in the Seminole War, the Indian Wars and the American Civil War (born 1818)
- July 23 – Ginery Twichell, transportation manager and politician (born 1811)
- July 24 – Thomas Swann, politician and president of Baltimore and Ohio Railroad from 1847 to 1853 (born 1809)
- July 27 – Montgomery Blair, politician and lawyer (born 1813)
- September 16 – Junius Brutus Booth Jr., actor and theatre manager (born 1821)
- October 4 – Henry Farnam, surveyor, railroad president and philanthropist (born 1809)
- October 22 – Thomas Mayne Reid, novelist (born 1818 in Ireland)
- November 20 – Augustus C. Dodge, U.S. Senator from Iowa from 1848 to 1855 (born 1812)
- November 24 – Albert Fitch Bellows, landscape painter (born 1829)
- November 26 – Sojourner Truth, African American abolitionist and women's rights activist (born c. 1797)
- December 27 – Andrew A. Humphreys, general and civil engineer (born 1810)
- Mary S. B. Shindler, poet (born 1810)

== See also ==
- Timeline of United States history (1860–1899)
