= 1884 in the United States =

- Decades: 1860s; 1870s; 1880s; 1890s; 1900s
- See also: History of the United States (1865–1918); Timeline of United States history (1860–1899); List of years in the United States

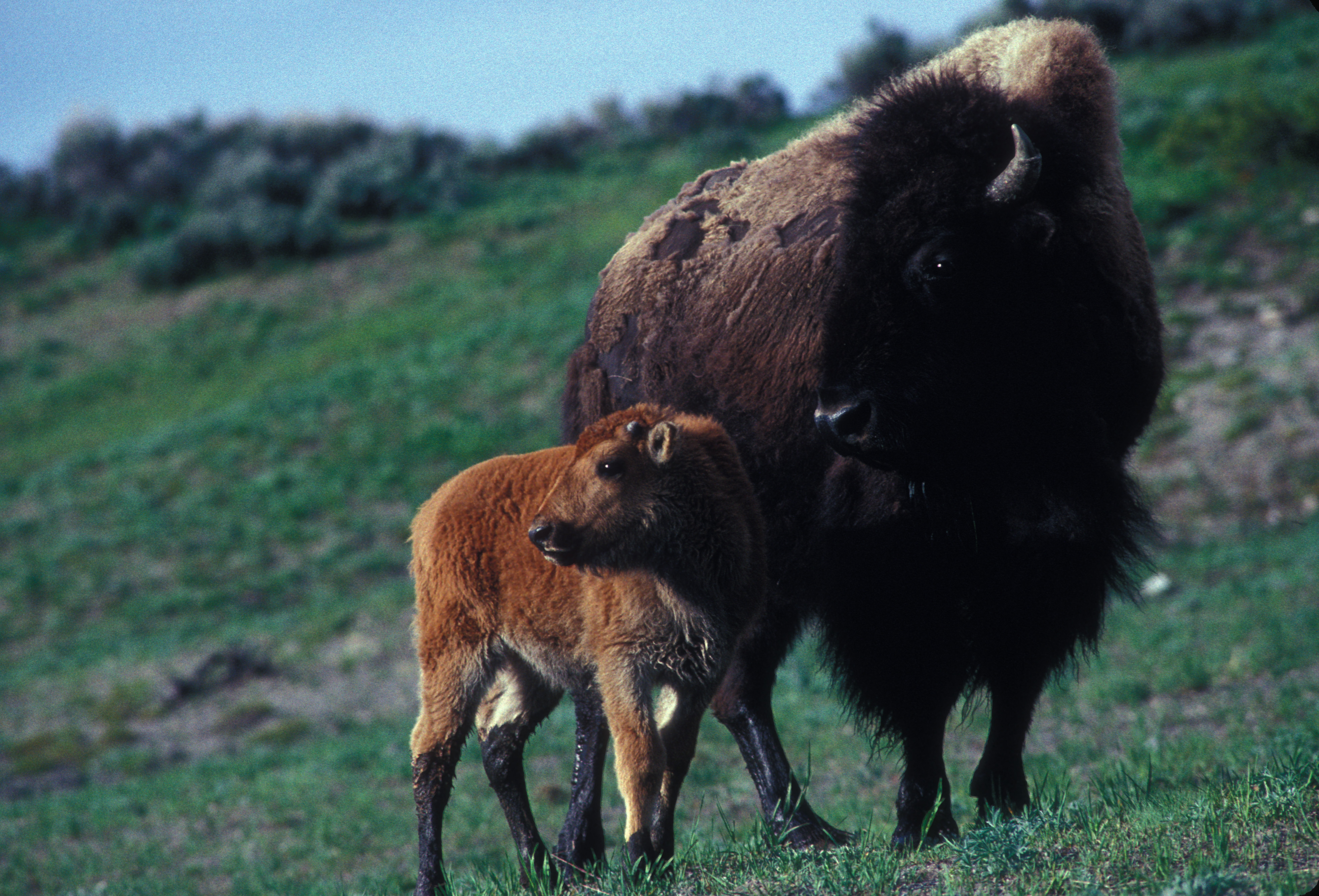
By 1884, fewer than 1,000 buffalo remain from an estimated pre-colonization population of 30 million

Events from the year 1884 in the United States.

== Incumbents ==
=== Federal government ===
- President: Chester A. Arthur (R-New York)
- Vice President: vacant
- Chief Justice: Morrison Waite (Ohio)
- Speaker of the House of Representatives: John G. Carlisle (D-Kentucky)
- Congress: 48th

==== State governments ====
Governors and lieutenant governors

=== Governors ===
- Governor of Alabama: Edward A. O'Neal (Democratic)
- Governor of Arkansas: James Henderson Berry (Democratic)
- Governor of California: George Stoneman (Republican)
- Governor of Colorado: James Benton Grant (Democratic)
- Governor of Connecticut: Thomas M. Waller (Democratic)
- Governor of Delaware: Charles C. Stockley (Democratic)
- Governor of Florida: William D. Bloxham (Democratic)
- Governor of Georgia: Henry D. McDaniel (Democratic)
- Governor of Illinois: John Marshall Hamilton (Republican)
- Governor of Indiana: Albert G. Porter (Republican)
- Governor of Iowa: Buren R. Sherman (Republican)
- Governor of Kansas: George W. Glick (Democratic)
- Governor of Kentucky: J. Proctor Knott (Democratic)
- Governor of Louisiana: Samuel D. McEnery (Democratic)
- Governor of Maine: Frederick Robie (Republican)
- Governor of Maryland: William T. Hamilton (Democratic) (until January 9), Robert Milligan McLane (Democratic) (starting January 9)
- Governor of Massachusetts: Benjamin F. Butler (Democratic) (until January 3), George D. Robinson (Republican) (starting January 3)
- Governor of Michigan: Josiah Begole (Democratic)
- Governor of Minnesota: Lucius F. Hubbard (Republican)
- Governor of Mississippi: Robert Lowry (Democratic)
- Governor of Missouri: Thomas Theodore Crittenden (Democratic)
- Governor of Nebraska: James W. Dawes (Republican)
- Governor of Nevada: Jewett W. Adams (Democratic)
- Governor of New Hampshire: Samuel W. Hale (Republican)
- Governor of New Jersey: George C. Ludlow (Democratic) (until January 15), Leon Abbett (Democratic) (starting January 15)
- Governor of New York: Grover Cleveland (Democratic)
- Governor of North Carolina: Thomas Jordan Jarvis (Democratic)
- Governor of Ohio: Charles Foster (Republican) (until January 14), George Hoadly (Democratic) (starting January 14)
- Governor of Oregon: Z. F. Moody (Republican)
- Governor of Pennsylvania: Robert E. Pattison (Democratic)
- Governor of Rhode Island: Augustus O. Bourn (Republican)
- Governor of South Carolina: Hugh Smith Thompson (Democratic)
- Governor of Tennessee: William B. Bate (Democratic)
- Governor of Texas: Oran M. Roberts (Democratic) (until January 16), John Ireland (Democratic) (starting January 16)
- Governor of Vermont: John L. Barstow (Republican) (until October 2), Samuel E. Pingree (Republican) (starting October 2)
- Governor of Virginia: William E. Cameron (Re-adjuster)
- Governor of West Virginia: Jacob B. Jackson (Democratic)
- Governor of Wisconsin: Jeremiah McLain Rusk (Republican)

=== Lieutenant governors ===
- Lieutenant Governor of California: John Daggett (Democratic)
- Lieutenant Governor of Colorado: William H. Meyer (Republican)
- Lieutenant Governor of Connecticut: George G. Sumner (Democratic)
- Lieutenant Governor of Florida: Livingston W. Bethel (no political party)
- Lieutenant Governor of Illinois: William J. Campbell (Republican)
- Lieutenant Governor of Indiana: Thomas Hanna (Republican)
- Lieutenant Governor of Iowa: Orlando H. Manning (Republican)
- Lieutenant Governor of Kansas: David Wesley Finney (Republican)
- Lieutenant Governor of Kentucky: James R. Hindman (Democratic)
- Lieutenant Governor of Louisiana: vacant (until month and day unknown), Clay Knobloch (Democratic) (starting month and day unknown)
- Lieutenant Governor of Massachusetts: Oliver Ames (Democratic)
- Lieutenant Governor of Michigan: Moreau S. Crosby (Republican)
- Lieutenant Governor of Minnesota: Charles A. Gilman (Republican)
- Lieutenant Governor of Mississippi: G. D. Shands (Democratic)
- Lieutenant Governor of Missouri: Robert Alexander Campbell (Democratic)
- Lieutenant Governor of Nebraska: Alfred W. Agee (Republican)
- Lieutenant Governor of Nevada: Charles E. Laughton (Republican)
- Lieutenant Governor of New York: David B. Hill (Republican)
- Lieutenant Governor of North Carolina: James L. Robinson (Democratic)
- Lieutenant Governor of Ohio: Rees G. Richards (Republican) (until January 14), John George Warwick (Democratic) (starting January 14)
- Lieutenant Governor of Pennsylvania: Chauncey Forward Black (Democratic)
- Lieutenant Governor of Rhode Island: Oscar Rathbun (political party unknown)
- Lieutenant Governor of South Carolina: John Calhoun Sheppard (Democratic)
- Lieutenant Governor of Tennessee: Benjamin F. Alexander (Democratic)
- Lieutenant Governor of Texas: Francis M. Martin (Democratic)
- Lieutenant Governor of Vermont: Samuel E. Pingree (Republican) (until October 2), Ebenezer J. Ormsbee (Republican) (starting October 2)
- Lieutenant Governor of Virginia: John F. Lewis (Republican)
- Lieutenant Governor of Wisconsin: Sam S. Fifield (Republican)

== Events ==
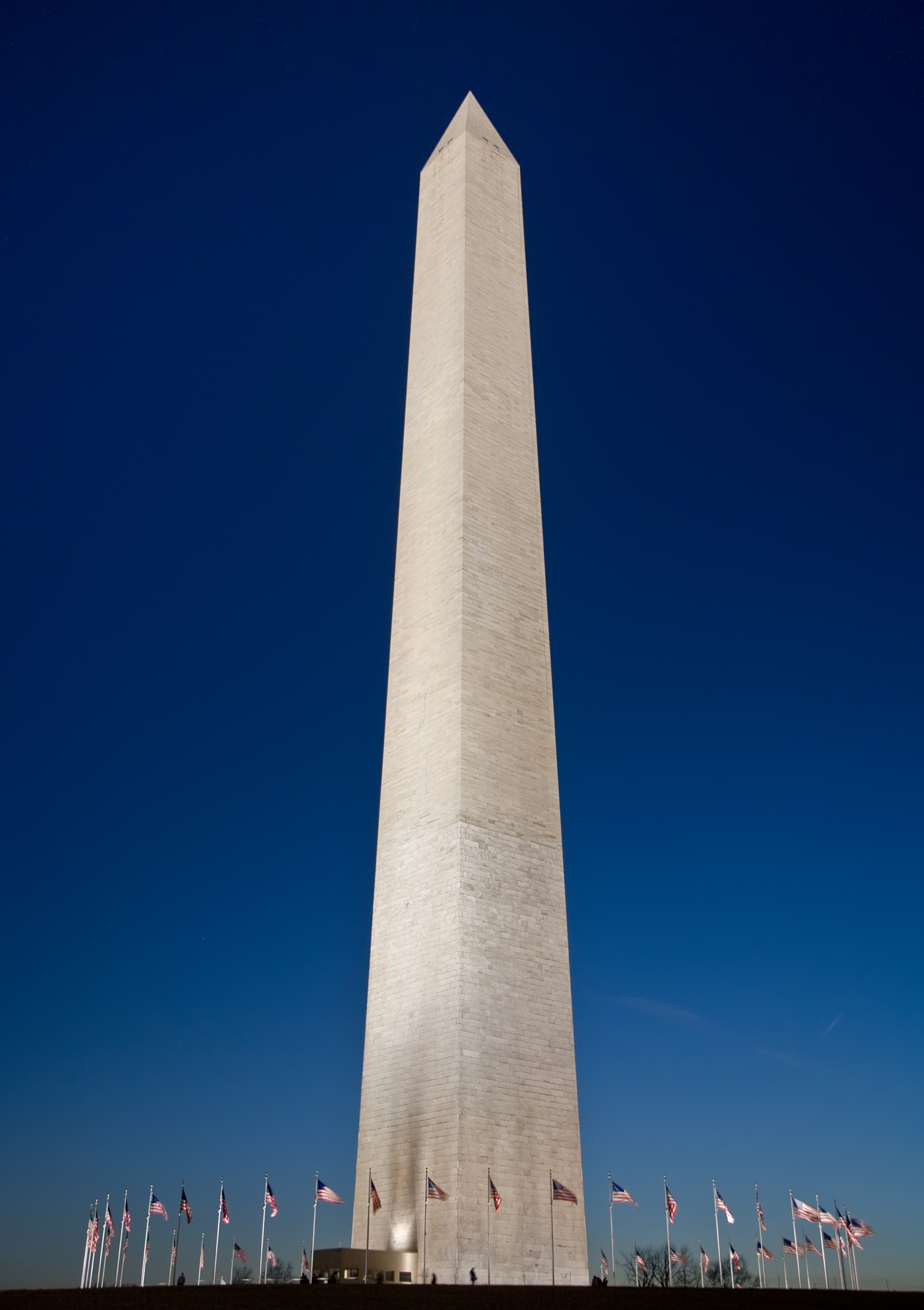
December 6: Washington Monument completed.

- January 3 – P. J. Kennedy enters the Massachusetts House of Representatives, the first of at least 140 years of political office held by the Kennedy family.
- March 27–29 – Cincinnati riots of 1884.
- April 21 – Hammond, Indiana, is incorporated a city.
- May 1 – The eight-hour workday is first proclaimed by the Federation of Organized Trades and Labor Unions in the United States. May 1, called May Day or Labour Day, is now a holiday recognized in almost every industrialized country.
- May 17 – Alaska becomes a United States territory.
- June 13 – LaMarcus Adna Thompson opens "Gravity Pleasure Switchback Railway", one of the earliest roller coasters, at Coney Island, New York City.
- August 5 – The cornerstone for the Statue of Liberty is laid on Bedloe's Island in New York Harbor.
- August 10 – An earthquake measuring 5.5 M_{fa} (based on the felt area) affected a very large portion of the eastern United States. The shock had a maximum Mercalli intensity of VII (Very strong). Chimneys were toppled in New York, New Jersey, Connecticut, and Pennsylvania. Property damage was severe in Jamaica and Amityville in New York.
- August 28 – The earliest known photograph of a tornado is taken by F. N. Robinson during a tornado outbreak in South Dakota.
- September 5 – Staten Island Academy is founded.
- October – International Meridian Conference in Washington, D.C., fixes the Greenwich meridian as the world's prime meridian.
- October 6 – The United States Naval War College is established in Newport, Rhode Island.
- November 4 – 1884 United States presidential election: Democratic governor of New York Grover Cleveland defeats Republican James G. Blaine of Maine in a very close contest to win the first of his non-consecutive terms.
- December 1 – American Old West: Near Frisco, New Mexico, deputy sheriff Elfego Baca holds off a gang of 80 Texan cowboys who want to kill him for arresting cowboy Charles McCarthy (the cowboys were terrorizing the area's Hispanos and Baca was working against them).
- December 6 – The Washington Monument is completed.
- December 16 – The World Cotton Centennial World's Fair opens in New Orleans, Louisiana.

=== Undated ===
- Helen Hunt Jackson completes and publishes Ramona.
- The water hyacinth is introduced in the U.S. and quickly becomes an invasive species.
- In the "rain year" from July 1883 to June 1884, Los Angeles and San Diego receive their heaviest rainfall since instrumental records began, with Los Angeles receiving 38.18 inches (969.8 mm) and San Diego 25.97 inches (659.6 mm).
- Ringling Brothers Circus established.
- American Historical Association established.
- American bison herd size reaches a low point, with fewer than 1,000 individuals remaining (resulting in a severe genetic bottleneck).

=== Ongoing ===
- Gilded Age (1869 – c. 1896)
- Depression of 1882–85 (1882–1885)

== Sport ==
- September 15 – The Providence Grays win their Second(and Final) National League pennant with a 10–2 win over the Cleveland Blues, in the first ever game to be called, the World Series

== Births ==
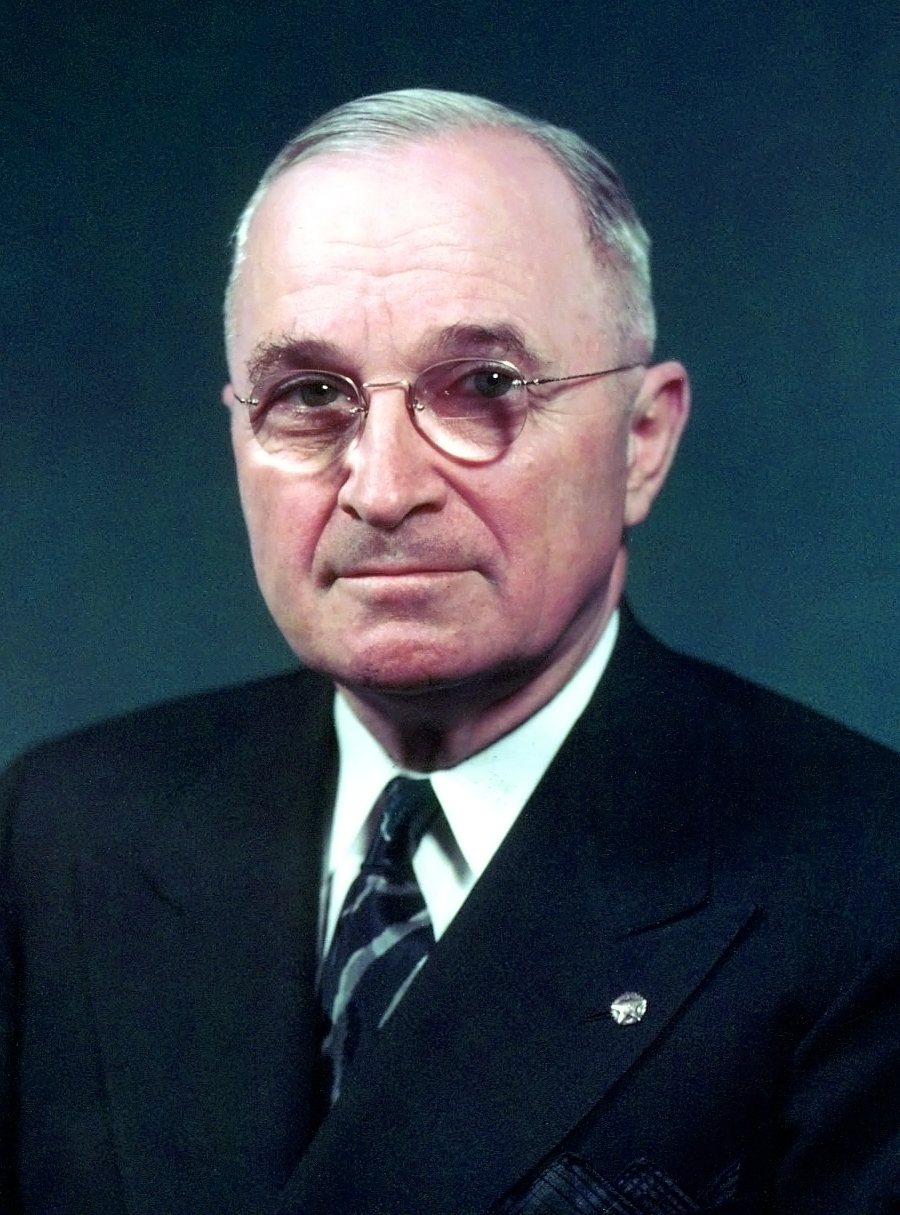
Harry S. Truman

- January 1
  - Edwin C. Johnson, U.S. senator from Colorado from 1955 to 1957 (died 1970)
  - Papa Celestin, jazz bandleader, singer, cornetist, and trumpeter (died 1954)
- January 12
  - Louis Horst, choreographer, composer, pianist (died 1964)
  - Texas Guinan, actress and producer (died 1933)
  - Charles Armijo Woodruff, 11th governor of American Samoa (died 1945)
- January 26 – Roy Chapman Andrews, adventurer and naturalist (died 1960)
- February 15 – Alfred Carlton Gilbert, inventor, athlete, magician, and businessman (died 1961)
- February 18
  - Mary M. Crawford, surgeon (died 1972)
  - Burt Mustin, character actor (died 1977)
- March 10 – Stuart Holmes, actor and sculptor (died 1971)
- March 11 – Sheridan Downey, U.S. senator from California from 1939 to 1950 (died 1961)
- March 17 – Alcide Nunez, jazz musician (died 1934)
- March 21 – George D. Birkhoff, mathematician (died 1944)
- March 22 – Arthur H. Vandenberg, U.S. senator from Michigan from 1928 to 1951 (died 1951)
- March 31 – James P. Pope, U.S. senator from Idaho from 1933 to 1939 (died 1966)
- April 1 – George A. Wilson, U.S. senator from Iowa from 1943 to 1949 (died 1953)
- April 17 – Leo Frank, factory superintendent and convicted murderer (died 1915)
- April 20 – Oliver Kirk, bantamweight and featherweight professional boxer (died 1960)
- May 8 – Harry S. Truman, 33rd president of the United States from 1945 to 1953, 34th vice president of the United States from January to April 1945 (died 1972)
- May 26 – Charles Winninger, stage and film actor (died 1969)
- June 21
  - Cack Henley, baseball player (died 1929)
  - Garrett L. Withers, U.S. senator from Kentucky from 1949 to 1950 (died 1953)
- June 22 – James Rector, Olympic athlete (died 1949)
- July 7 – J. Roy Hunt, motion picture cameraman and cinematographer (died 1972)
- August 9 – John S. McCain Sr., U.S. Navy admiral (died 1945)
- August 27 – Harry Antrim, actor (died 1967)
- September 1 – Richard C. Saufley, naval aviation pioneer (died 1916)
- October 7 – Harold Geiger, aviation pioneer (died 1927)
- October 9 – Martin Johnson, adventurer and filmmaker (died 1937)
- October 11 – Eleanor Roosevelt, First Lady of the United States from 1933 to 1945 (died 1962)
- November 20 – Loyal Blaine Aldrich, astronomer (died 1965)
- December 2 – Ruth Draper, actress and monologist (died 1956)
- Legrand Chapell

== Deaths ==
- 14 February
  - Alice Hathaway Lee Roosevelt, first wife of Theodore Roosevelt (born 1861)
  - Martha Bulloch Roosevelt, mother of Theodore Roosevelt (born 1835)
- 13 March – Leland Stanford Jr., son of Governor Leland Stanford of California, in whose memory Stanford University is founded (born 1868)
- 21 March – Ezra Abbot, Bible scholar (born 1819)
- 23 March – Henry C. Lord, railroad executive (born 1824)
- 31 March – Frederick Leypoldt, bibliographer (born 1835 in Germany)
- 3 May – Truman Smith, U.S. senator from Connecticut from 1849 to 1854 (born 1791)
- 6 May – Judah P. Benjamin, United States senator from Louisiana from 1853 till 1861, 1st Confederate States Attorney General, 2nd Confederate States Secretary of War, 3rd Confederate States Secretary of State, died in Paris, France (born 1811)
- 13 May – Cyrus McCormick, inventor (born 1809)
- 8 June – Henry Clay Work, composer (born 1832)
- 12 June – Frank Pidgeon, baseball pitcher (born 1825)
- 1 July – Allan Pinkerton, detective (born 1819)
- 10 July – Paul Morphy, chess player (born 1837)
- 15 July – Almira Hart Lincoln Phelps, educator and author (born 1793)
- 23 August – LeRoy Pope Walker, 1st Confederate States Secretary of War (born 1817)
- 2 September – Henry B. Anthony, U.S. senator from Rhode Island from 1859 to 1884 (born 1815)
- 26 September – John W. Garrett, banker, president of the Baltimore and Ohio Railroad and philanthropist (born 1820)
- 6 November – William Wells Brown, African American writer (born 1814)
- 9 December – Mary Bell Smith, educator, social reformer, and writer. (born 1818)
- Date unknown – Wendel Bollman, civil engineer (born 1814)

== See also ==
- Timeline of United States history (1860–1899)
