= 1808 in the United States =

- Decades: 1780s; 1790s; 1800s; 1810s; 1820s
- See also: History of the United States (1789–1849); Timeline of United States history (1790–1819); List of years in the United States

Events from the year 1808 in the United States.

== Incumbents ==
=== Federal government ===
- President: Thomas Jefferson (DR-Virginia)
- Vice President: George Clinton (DR-New York)
- Chief Justice: John Marshall (Virginia)
- Speaker of the House of Representatives: Joseph Bradley Varnum (DR-Massachusetts)
- Congress: 10th

==== State governments ====
Governors and lieutenant governors

=== Governors ===
- Governor of Connecticut: Jonathan Trumbull Jr. (Federalist)
- Governor of Delaware: Nathaniel Mitchell (Federalist) (until January 19), George Truitt (Federalist) (starting January 19)
- Governor of Georgia: Jared Irwin (Democratic-Republican)
- Governor of Kentucky: Christopher Greenup (Democratic-Republican) (until September 1), Charles Scott (Democratic-Republican) (starting September 1)
- Governor of Maryland: Robert Wright (Democratic-Republican)
- Governor of Massachusetts: James Sullivan (Democratic-Republican) (until December 10), Levi Lincoln Sr. (Democratic-Republican) (starting December 10)
- Governor of New Hampshire: John Langdon (Democratic-Republican)
- Governor of New Jersey: Joseph Bloomfield (Democratic-Republican)
- Governor of New York: Daniel D. Tompkins (Democratic-Republican)
- Governor of North Carolina: Benjamin Williams (Federalist) (until December 12), David Stone (Democratic-Republican) (starting December 12)
- Governor of Ohio: Thomas Kirker (Democratic-Republican) (until December 12), Samuel Huntington (Democratic-Republican) (starting December 12)
- Governor of Pennsylvania: Thomas McKean (Democratic-Republican) (until December 20), Simon Snyder (Democratic-Republican) (starting December 20)
- Governor of Rhode Island: James Fenner (Democratic-Republican)
- Governor of South Carolina: Charles Pinckney (Democratic-Republican) (until December 10), John Drayton (Democratic-Republican) (starting December 10)
- Governor of Tennessee: John Sevier (Democratic-Republican)
- Governor of Vermont: Israel Smith (Democratic-Republican) (until October 14), Isaac Tichenor (Federalist) (starting October 14)
- Governor of Virginia: William H. Cabell (Democratic-Republican) (until December 1), John Tyler Sr. (Democratic-Republican) (starting December 1)

=== Lieutenant governors ===
- Lieutenant Governor of Connecticut: John Treadwell (Federalist)
- Lieutenant Governor of Kentucky: Thomas Posey (Democratic-Republican) (until December), Gabriel Slaughter (Democratic-Republican) (starting December)
- Lieutenant Governor of Massachusetts: Levi Lincoln Sr. (political party unknown) (until month and day unknown), Gabriel Slaughter (political party unknown) (starting month and day unknown)
- Lieutenant Governor of New York: John Broome (Democratic-Republican)
- Lieutenant Governor of Rhode Island: Constant Taber (political party unknown) (until month and day unknown), Simeon Martin (political party unknown) (starting month and day unknown)
- Lieutenant Governor of South Carolina: John Hopkins (Democratic-Republican) (until December 10), Frederick Nance (Democratic-Republican) (starting December 10)
- Lieutenant Governor of Vermont: Paul Brigham (Democratic-Republican)

== Events ==
- January 1 – Act Prohibiting Importation of Slaves (1807) comes into effect: The importation of slaves into the United States is banned; this is also the earliest day under the United States Constitution that an amendment can be made restricting slavery.
- February 6 – The ship Topaz (from Boston April 5, 1807, hunting seals) rediscovers the Pitcairn Islands; only one HMS Bounty mutineer is found alive, Alexander Smith (John Adams).
- February 11 – Anthracite coal is first burned as fuel by Jesse Fell in Wilkes-Barre, Pennsylvania; the discovery leads to the use of coal as the key fuel source of America's Industrial Revolution.
- April 6 – John Jacob Astor founds the American Fur Company.
- April 24 – Irish Dominican R. Luke Concanen is consecrated first bishop of the newly erected Roman Catholic Diocese of New York (appointed April 8) but is unable to sail from Italy to America before his death in 1810 due to restrictions caused by the Napoleonic Wars.
- November – James Madison defeats Charles C. Pinckney in the 1808 United States presidential election.

== Births ==
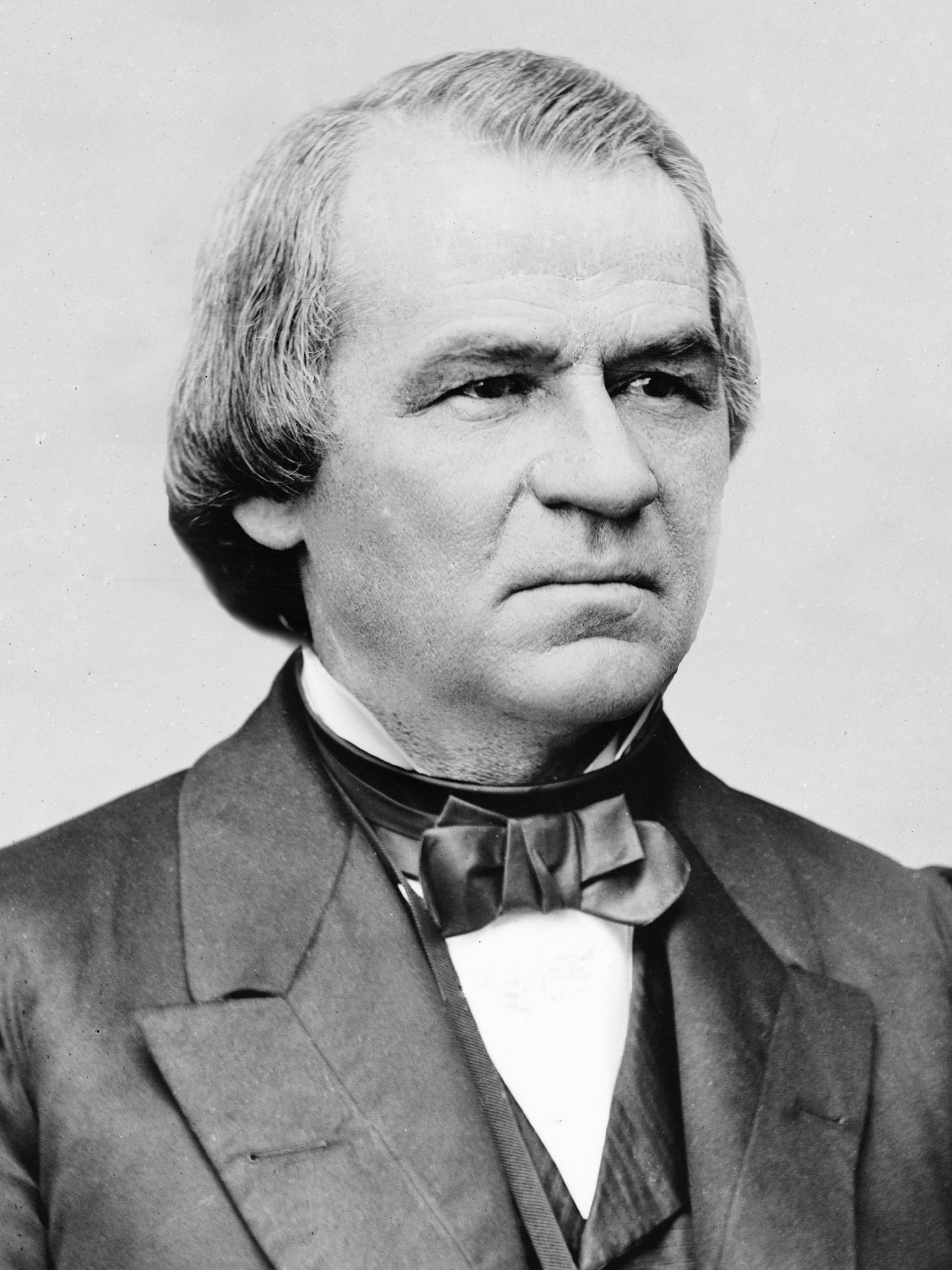
Andrew Johnson

- January 6 – Joseph Pitty Couthouy, naval officer (died 1864)
- January 8 – John A. Poor, lawyer, editor and railroad entrepreneur (died 1871)
- January 13 – Salmon P. Chase, 6th Chief Justice of the United States, 25th United States Secretary of the Treasury (died 1873)
- January 19 – Lysander Spooner, philosopher (died 1887)
- February 10 – John Edgar Thomson, civil engineer and railroad entrepreneur (died 1874)
- March 1 – Edward "Ned" Kendall, bandleader, instrumentalist (keyed bugle) (died 1861)
- March 14 – Narcissa Whitman, pioneer missionary (died 1847)
- May 2 – Emma Darwin, wife of biologist Charles Darwin (died 1896)
- May 6 – William Strong, politician, Associate Justice of the Supreme Court of the United States (died 1895)
- May 20 – Thomas D. Rice, actor and dancer (died 1860)
- June 3 – Jefferson Davis, President of the Confederate States from 1861 to 1865 and U.S. Senator from Mississippi from 1847 to 1851 and from 1857 to 1861 (died 1889)
- July 9 – Alexander William Doniphan, lawyer and military leader (died 1887)
- July 16 – Daniel Wells Jr., politician (died 1902)
- August 11 – William W. Chapman, politician and lawyer (died 1892)
- September 21 – Solon Borland, U.S. Senator from Arkansas from 1848 to 1853 (died 1864)
- September 29 – Henry Bennett, politician (died 1868)
- November 1 – John Taylor, 3rd president of the Church of Jesus Christ of Latter-day Saints (died 1887)
- November 29 – William F. Johnston, politician (died 1872)
- December 16 – Kinsley S. Bingham, U.S. Senator from Michigan from 1859 to 1861 (died 1861)
- December 29 – Andrew Johnson, 17th president of the United States from 1865 to 1869, 16th vice president of the United States from March to April 1865 (died 1875)

== Deaths ==
- February 14 – John Dickinson, Founding Father of the United States, signatory of Continental Association, Articles of Confederation, and United States Constitution (born 1732)
- May 18 – Elijah Craig, preacher and entrepreneur, distiller of bourbon whiskey (born 1738)
- September 3 – John Montgomery, delegate to the Continental Congress (born 1722)
- September 17 – Benjamin Bourne, politician (born 1755)
- October 9 – John Claiborne, politician (born 1777)
- November 1 – Lewis Hallam Jr., actor (born c.1740 in England)

== See also ==
- Timeline of United States history (1790–1819)
- Timeline of the Thomas Jefferson presidency § 1808
