= 1810 in the United States =

- Decades: 1790s; 1800s; 1810s; 1820s; 1830s
- See also: History of the United States (1789–1849); Timeline of United States history (1790–1819); List of years in the United States

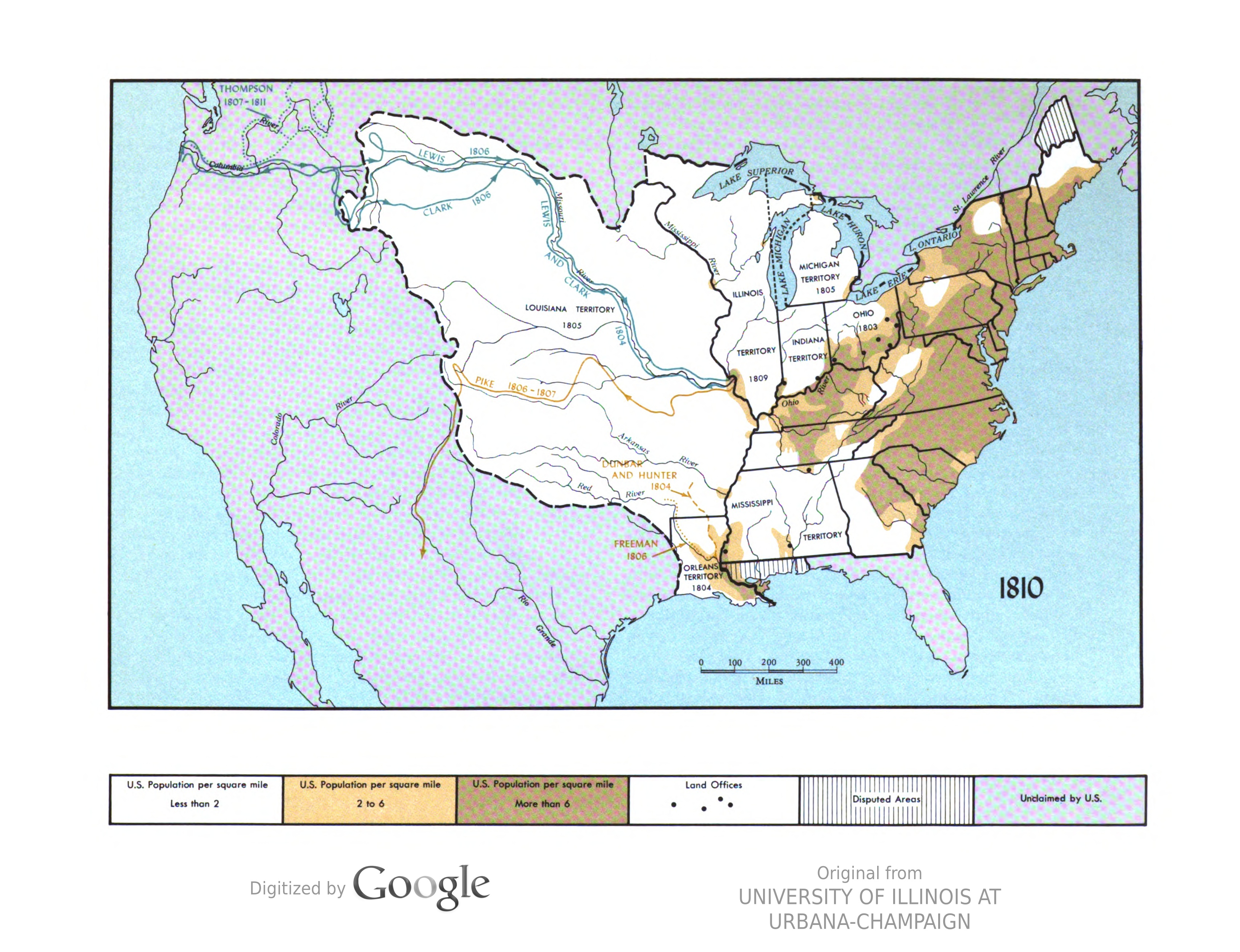
1810 in the United States

Events from the year 1810 in the United States.

== Incumbents ==
=== Federal government ===
- President: James Madison (DR-Virginia)
- Vice president: George Clinton (DR-New York)
- Chief justice: John Marshall (Virginia)
- Speaker of the House of Representatives: Joseph Bradley Varnum (DR-Massachusetts)
- Congress: 11th

==== State governments ====
Governors and lieutenant governors

=== Governors ===
- Governor of Connecticut: John Treadwell (Federalist)
- Governor of Delaware: George Truitt (Federalist)
- Governor of Georgia: David Brydie Mitchell (Democratic-Republican)
- Governor of Kentucky: Charles Scott (Democratic-Republican)
- Governor of Maryland: Edward Lloyd (Democratic-Republican)
- Governor of Massachusetts: Christopher Gore (Federalist) (until June 10), Elbridge Gerry (Democratic-Republican) (starting June 10)
- Governor of New Hampshire: Jeremiah Smith (Federalist) (until June 5), John Langdon (Democratic-Republican) (starting June 5)
- Governor of New Jersey: Joseph Bloomfield (Democratic-Republican)
- Governor of New York: Daniel D. Tompkins (Democratic-Republican)
- Governor of North Carolina: David Stone (Democratic-Republican) (until December 1), Benjamin Smith (Democratic-Republican) (starting December 1)
- Governor of Ohio: Samuel Huntington (Democratic-Republican) (until December 8), Return J. Meigs, Jr. (Democratic-Republican) (starting December 8)
- Governor of Pennsylvania: Simon Snyder (Democratic-Republican)
- Governor of Rhode Island: James Fenner (Democratic-Republican)
- Governor of South Carolina: John Drayton (Democratic-Republican) (until December 8), Henry Middleton (Democratic-Republican) (starting December 8)
- Governor of Tennessee: Willie Blount (Democratic-Republican)
- Governor of Vermont: Jonas Galusha (Democratic-Republican)
- Governor of Virginia: John Tyler, Sr. (Democratic-Republican)

=== Lieutenant governors ===
- Lieutenant Governor of Connecticut: Roger Griswold (Federalist)
- Lieutenant Governor of Kentucky: Gabriel Slaughter (political party unknown)
- Lieutenant Governor of Massachusetts: David Cobb (political party unknown) (until month and day unknown), William Gray (political party unknown) (starting month and day unknown)
- Lieutenant Governor of New York: John Broome (Democratic-Republican) (until end of June 30), John Tayler (Democratic-Republican) (starting July 1)
- Lieutenant Governor of Rhode Island: Simeon Martin (political party unknown) (until month and day unknown), Isaac Wilbour (Democratic-Republican) (starting month and day unknown)
- Lieutenant Governor of South Carolina: Frederick Nance (Democratic-Republican) (until December 8), Samuel Farrow (Democratic-Republican) (starting December 8)
- Lieutenant Governor of Vermont: Paul Brigham (Democratic-Republican)

== Events ==
- May 1 – Macon's Bill Number 2 becomes law, intending to motivate Britain and France to stop seizing American vessels during the Napoleonic Wars.
- June 4 – The Society in Dedham for Apprehending Horse Thieves is founded in Dedham, Massachusetts.
- June 23 – John Jacob Astor forms the Pacific Fur Company.
- September 8 – The Tonquin sets sail from New York Harbor with 33 employees of John Jacob Astor's newly created Pacific Fur Company on board. After a 6-month journey around the tip of South America, the ship arrives at the mouth of the Columbia River and Astor's men establish the fur-trading post of Fort Astoria.
- September 23 – The Republic of West Florida declares independence from Spain.
- October 27 – The United States annexes the Republic of West Florida.

=== Undated ===
- Rocky Point Manor is built in Harrodsburg, Kentucky.
- Western Cherokees establish themselves between the White River and the Arkansas River in what is now Arkansas.

== Births ==
- April 10 – Mary Whitwell Hale, American teacher, school founder, and hymnwriter (died 1862)
- April 10 – Willis Benson Machen, U.S. Senator from Kentucky from 1872 to 1873 (died 1893)
- April 17 – Joseph A. Wright, U.S. Senator from Indiana from 1862 to 1863 (died 1867)
- May 10 – James Shields, U.S. Senator from Illinois from 1849 to 1855, from Minnesota from 1858 to 1859 and from Missouri in 1879, born in Ireland (died 1879)
- May 23 – Margaret Fuller, Transcendentalist journalist, literary critic and women's rights advocate (drowned 1850)
- May 31 – Horatio Seymour, 18th Governor of New York, Democratic Party nominee for President of the United States in the presidential election of 1868 (died 1886)
- June 12 – David Levy Yulee, U.S. Senator from Florida from 1845 to 1851 and from 1855 to 1861 (died 1886)
- July 2 – Robert Toombs, U.S. Senator from Georgia from 1853 to 1861, 1st Confederate States Secretary of State (died 1885)
- July 5 – P. T. Barnum, showman (died 1891)
- August 6 – William Ticknor, publisher (died 1864)
- August 24 – Theodore Parker, preacher, Transcendentalist and abolitionist (died 1860)
- September 2 – William Seymour Tyler, educator and historian (died 1897)
- October 4 – Eliza McCardle Johnson, First Lady of the United States, Second Lady of the United States (died 1876)
- October 8 – James W. Marshall, contractor, builder of Sutter's Mill (died 1885)
- November 2 – Andrew A. Humphreys, general and civil engineer (died 1883)
- November 9 – Thomas Bragg, U.S. Senator from North Carolina from 1859 to 1861, 2nd Confederate States Attorney General (died 1872)
- November 25 – Charles E. Stuart, U.S. Senator from Michigan from 1853 to 1859 (died 1887)
- December 14 – John Burton Thompson, U.S. Senator from Kentucky from 1853 to 1859 (died 1874)
- December 25 – L. L. Langstroth, beekeeper (died 1895)

== Deaths ==
- January 20 – Benjamin Chew, Chief Justice of colonial Pennsylvania (born 1722)
- February 22 – Charles Brockden Brown, novelist (born 1771)
- March 6 – William Washington, United States soldier (born 1752)
- October 13 – John Heath, politician (born 1758)
- October 15 – Alfred Moore, judge, Associate Justice of the United States Supreme Court (born 1755)
- November 11 – John Laurance, attorney, statesman and judge (born 1750)
- December 14 – Cyrus Griffin, lawyer, judge, last president of the Continental Congress (born 1749)

== See also ==
- Timeline of United States history (1790–1819)
