= 1807 in the United States =

- Decades: 1780s; 1790s; 1800s; 1810s; 1820s
- See also: History of the United States (1789–1849); Timeline of United States history (1790–1819); List of years in the United States

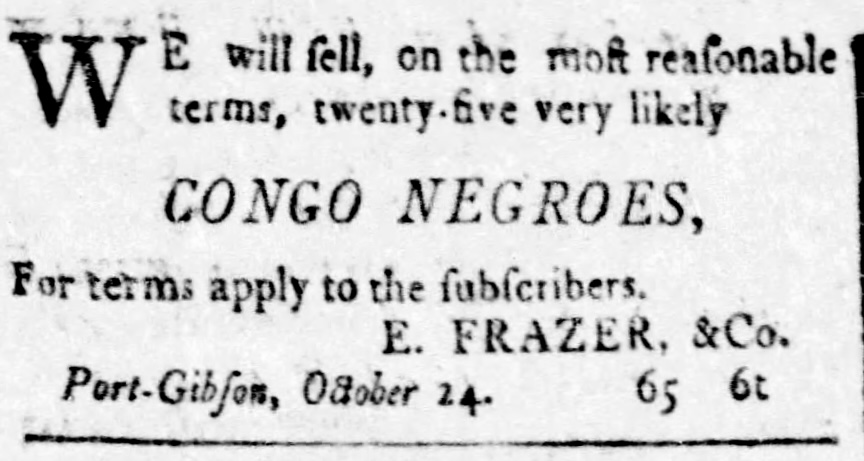
"...twenty-five very likely Congo negroes..." — 1807 was the last year it was legal to buy slaves imported to the U.S. via the transatlantic slave trade, before the Act Prohibiting Importation of Slaves went into effect on January 1, 1808

Events from the year 1807 in the United States.

== Incumbents ==
=== Federal government ===
- President: Thomas Jefferson (DR-Virginia)
- Vice President: George Clinton (DR-New York)
- Chief Justice: John Marshall (Virginia)
- Speaker of the House of Representatives:

Nathaniel Macon (DR-North Carolina) (until March 4)
Joseph Bradley Varnum (DR-Massachusetts) (starting October 26)

- Congress: 9th (until March 4), 10th (starting March 4)

==== State governments ====
Governors and lieutenant governors

=== Governors ===
- Governor of Connecticut: Jonathan Trumbull Jr. (Federalist)
- Governor of Delaware: Nathaniel Mitchell (Federalist)
- Governor of Georgia: Jared Irwin (Democratic-Republican)
- Governor of Kentucky: Christopher Greenup (Democratic-Republican)
- Governor of Maryland: Robert Wright (Democratic-Republican)
- Governor of Massachusetts: Caleb Strong (Federalist) (until May 29), James Sullivan (Democratic-Republican) (starting May 29)
- Governor of New Hampshire: John Langdon (Democratic-Republican)
- Governor of New Jersey: Joseph Bloomfield (Democratic-Republican)
- Governor of New York: Morgan Lewis (Democratic-Republican) (until end of June 30), Daniel D. Tompkins (Democratic-Republican) (starting July 1)
- Governor of North Carolina: Nathaniel Alexander (Democratic-Republican) (until December 1), Benjamin Williams (Federalist) (starting December 1)
- Governor of Ohio: Edward Tiffin (Democratic-Republican) (until March 4), Thomas Kirker (Democratic-Republican) (starting March 4)
- Governor of Pennsylvania: Thomas McKean (Democratic-Republican)
- Governor of Rhode Island: Isaac Wilbour (Country) (until May 6), James Fenner (Democratic-Republican) (starting May 6)
- Governor of South Carolina: Charles Pinckney (Democratic-Republican)
- Governor of Tennessee: John Sevier (Democratic-Republican)
- Governor of Vermont: Isaac Tichenor (Federalist) (until October 9), Israel Smith (Democratic-Republican) (starting October 9)
- Governor of Virginia: William H. Cabell (Democratic-Republican)

=== Lieutenant governors ===
- Lieutenant Governor of Connecticut: John Treadwell (Federalist)
- Lieutenant Governor of Kentucky: Thomas Posey (political party unknown)
- Lieutenant Governor of Massachusetts: vacant (until month and day unknown), Levi Lincoln Sr. (political party unknown) (starting month and day unknown)
- Lieutenant Governor of New York: John Broome (Democratic-Republican)
- Lieutenant Governor of Rhode Island: Isaac Wilbour (Democratic-Republican) (until May 6), Constant Taber (political party unknown) (starting May 6)
- Lieutenant Governor of South Carolina: John Hopkins (Democratic-Republican)
- Lieutenant Governor of Vermont: Paul Brigham (Democratic-Republican)

== Events ==
- February 10 – The United States Coast Survey is established; work begins on August 3, 1816.
- February 19 – Burr conspiracy: Former Vice President of the United States Aaron Burr is arrested on charges of treason. He is accused of plotting to annex parts of Louisiana and Mexico to become part of an independent republic.
- March 2 – The U.S. Congress passes an act to "prohibit the importation of slaves into any port or place within the jurisdiction of the United States....from any foreign kingdom, place, or country" (to take effect January 1, 1808).
- May 22 – A grand jury indicts Aaron Burr for treason.
- June 22 – The Chesapeake–Leopard affair: The British warship HMS Leopard captures and boards the USS Chesapeake.
- July 1 – Pike Expedition ends.
- August 17 – The Clermont, Robert Fulton's first American steamboat, leaves New York City for Albany, New York, on the Hudson River, inaugurating the first commercial steamboat service in the world.
- September 1 – Aaron Burr is acquitted of treason.
- December 22 – The U.S. Congress passes the Embargo Act.

== Births ==
- January 6 – Joseph Holt, 25th United States Secretary of War and Judge Advocate General of the United States Army during the Lincoln assassination trials (died 1894)
- January 11 – Ezra Cornell, founder of Western Union and co-founder of Cornell University (died 1874)
- January 19
  - Robert M. Charlton, United States Senator from Georgia from 1852 till 1853 (died 1854)
  - Robert E. Lee, General of the Army of Northern Virginia during the American Civil War (died 1870)
- February 3 – Joseph E. Johnston, Confederate Army general (died 1891)
- February 16 – Lysander Cutler, Union general (died 1866)
- February 25 – George Trenholm, 2nd Confederate States Secretary of the Treasury (died 1876)
- February 27 – Henry Wadsworth Longfellow, poet and professor (died 1882)
- March 1 – Wilford Woodruff, 4th president of the Church of Jesus Christ of Latter-day Saints (died 1898)
- April 24 – Charles Ferguson Smith, Union Army major general (died 1862)
- May 1 – John B. Magruder, Confederate Army major general (died 1871)
- June 24 – John Pettit, United States Senator from Indiana from 1853 to 1855 (died 1877)
- June 25 – Edward A. Hannegan, United States Senator from Indiana from 1843 to 1849 (died 1859)
- July 12 – Silas Casey, Union Army major general (died 1882)
- August 11 – David Rice Atchison, United States Senator from Missouri from 1844 till 1855 (died 1886)
- August 18 – Charles Francis Adams Sr., United States Minister to the United Kingdom, son of John Quincy Adams (died 1886)
- September 25 – Alfred Vail, machinist and inventor (died 1859)
- October 17 – Stephen Adams, United States Senator from Mississippi from 1852 till 1857 (died 1857)
- October 30 – James S. Wadsworth, Union Army general (died 1864)
- December 14 – Francis Gillette, United States Senator from Connecticut from 1854 till 1855 (died 1879)
- December 17 – John Greenleaf Whittier, poet and abolitionist (died 1892)

== Deaths ==
- March 4 – Abraham Baldwin, United States Senator from Georgia from 1799 to 1807 (born 1754)
- May 13 – Eliphalet Dyer, jurist and statesman, delegate to the Continental Congress (born 1721)
- May 17 – John Gunby, Maryland soldier in the American Revolutionary War (born 1745)
- August 9 – Doublehead (Cherokee: ᏔᎵᏧᏍᎦ), Cherokee chief, murdered in Tennessee (born c. 1744)
- November 24 – Joseph Brant, Mohawk military and political leader (born 1743)
- November 26 - Oliver Ellsworth, 3rd Chief Justice of the Supreme Court (born 1745)
- Full date unknown - Eliphalet Chapin, furniture designer (born 1741)

== See also ==
- Timeline of United States history (1790–1819)
- Timeline of the Thomas Jefferson presidency § 1807
