= Hubert Anthony Shands =

Mississippi writer (1872–1955)

Hubert Anthony Shands (1872–1955) was a professor and author in Mississippi. His published works include a book on peculiarities of speech in Mississippi, a collection of short stories, and a novel dealing with themes including religion, morality, and race relations are among his publishings.

He was born in Sardis, Mississippi. His father was a lawyer, Democratic Party politician, and law school dean at the University of Mississippi Garvin Dugas Shands. Hubert Shands received a B.A., M.A. and Phd from the University of Mississippi. He received a second Phd from the University of Halle Wittenberg in Germany.

Hubert Harrison gave a highly favorable review of his book White and Black, calling it "a stark realistic study of racial relations in a country district of Southeastern Texas." Harrison compared it to T. S. Stribling's novel Birthright. A review in The Freeman described it as a novel with body and backbone. A brief writeup in The Negro Yearbook noted it addressed tenant farming, lynching, the legal system, and morality.

== Writings ==
- Some Peculiarities Of Speech In Mississippi (1893)
- The Most Foolish of All Things
- Black and White (1922), a novel
