= 1809 in the United States =

- Decades: 1780s; 1790s; 1800s; 1810s; 1820s
- See also: History of the United States (1789–1849); Timeline of United States history (1790–1819); List of years in the United States

Events from the year 1809 in the United States.

== Incumbents ==
=== Federal government ===
- President:

Thomas Jefferson (DR-Virginia) (until March 4)
James Madison (DR-Virginia) (starting March 4)

- Vice President: George Clinton (DR-New York)
- Chief Justice: John Marshall (Virginia)
- Speaker of the House of Representatives: Joseph Bradley Varnum (DR-Massachusetts)
- Congress: 10th (until March 4), 11th (starting March 4)

==== State governments ====
Governors and lieutenant governors

=== Governors ===
- Governor of Connecticut: Jonathan Trumbull Jr. (Federalist)
- Governor of Delaware: George Truitt (Federalist)
- Governor of Georgia: Jared Irwin (Democratic-Republican) (until November 10), David Brydie Mitchell (Democratic-Republican) (starting November 10)
- Governor of Kentucky: Charles Scott (Democratic-Republican)
- Governor of Maryland: Robert Wright (Democratic-Republican) (until June 9), Edward Lloyd (Democratic-Republican) (starting June 9)
- Governor of Massachusetts: Levi Lincoln Sr. (Democratic-Republican) (until May 1), Christopher Gore (Federalist) (starting May 1)
- Governor of New Hampshire: John Langdon (Democratic-Republican) (until June 8), Jeremiah Smith (Federalist) (starting June 8)
- Governor of New Jersey: Joseph Bloomfield (Democratic-Republican)
- Governor of New York: Daniel D. Tompkins (Democratic-Republican)
- Governor of North Carolina: David Stone (Democratic-Republican)
- Governor of Ohio: Samuel Huntington (Democratic-Republican)
- Governor of Pennsylvania: Simon Snyder (Democratic-Republican)
- Governor of Rhode Island: James Fenner (Democratic-Republican)
- Governor of South Carolina: John Drayton (Democratic-Republican)
- Governor of Tennessee: John Sevier (Democratic-Republican) (until September 20), Willie Blount (Democratic-Republican) (starting September 20)
- Governor of Vermont: Isaac Tichenor (Federalist) (until October 14), Jonas Galusha (Democratic-Republican) (starting October 14)
- Governor of Virginia: John Tyler Sr. (Democratic-Republican)

=== Lieutenant governors ===
- Lieutenant Governor of Connecticut: John Treadwell (Federalist) (until August 7), Roger Griswold (Federalist) (starting August 7)
- Lieutenant Governor of Kentucky: Gabriel Slaughter (political party unknown)
- Lieutenant Governor of Massachusetts: Levi Lincoln Sr. (political party unknown) (until month and day unknown), David Cobb (political party unknown) (starting month and day unknown)
- Lieutenant Governor of New York: John Broome (Democratic-Republican)
- Lieutenant Governor of Rhode Island: Simeon Martin (political party unknown)
- Lieutenant Governor of South Carolina: Frederick Nance (Democratic-Republican)
- Lieutenant Governor of Vermont: Paul Brigham (Democratic-Republican)

== Events ==
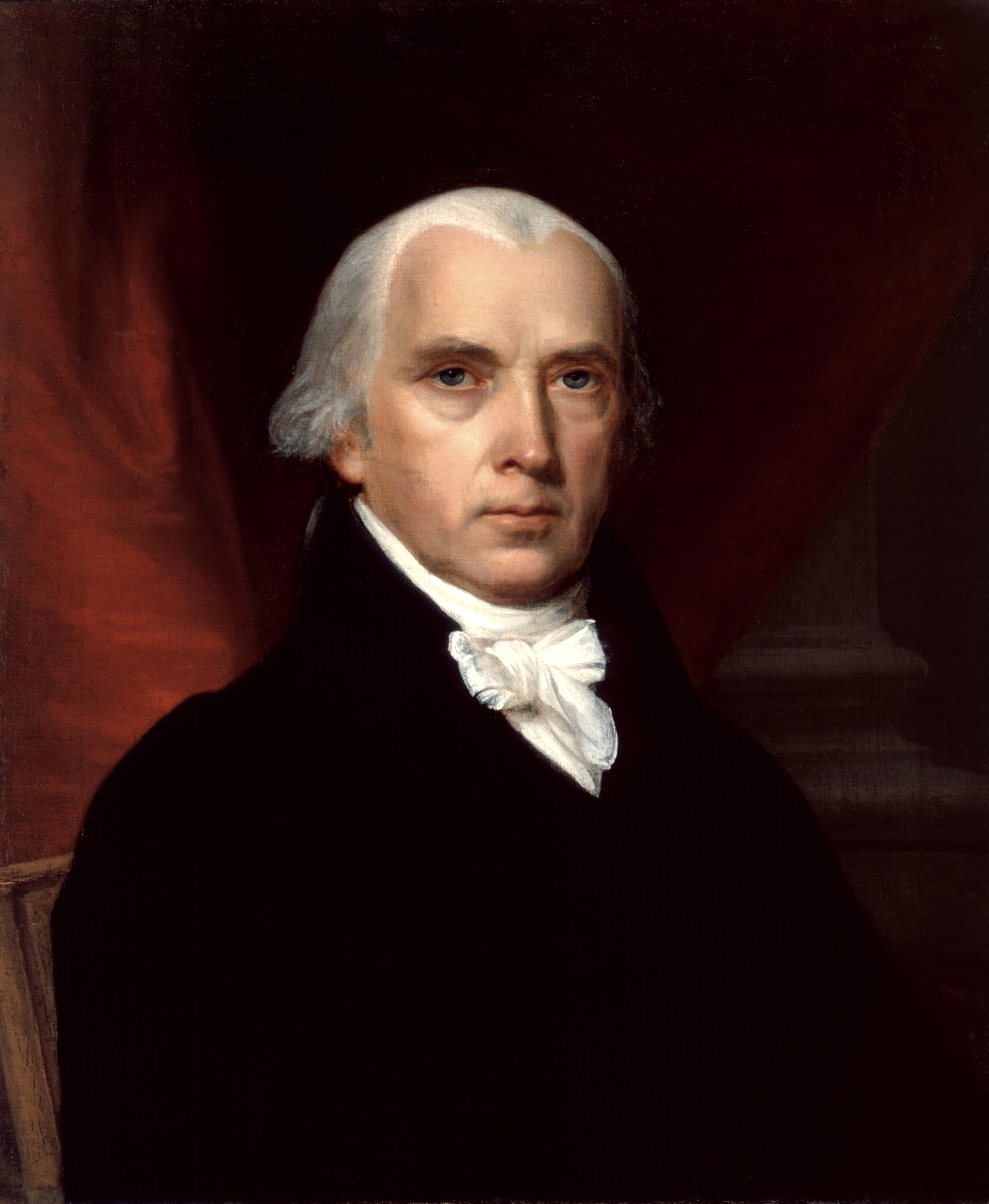
March 4: James Madison begins the first of two terms as the fourth U.S. president

- February 3 – Illinois Territory is created.
- February 11 – Robert Fulton patents the steamboat.
- February 17 – Miami University (Ohio) is established (by Act of February 2) on the township of land required to be set aside for it under the conditions of the Miami Purchase in 1794.
- February 20 – A decision by the Supreme Court of the United States states that the power of the federal government is greater than any individual state.
- March 1
  - Non-Intercourse Act passed to replace the Embargo Act of 1807.
  - Illinois Territory is effective.
- March 4 – James Madison is sworn in as the fourth president of the United States, and George Clinton is sworn in for a second term as the fourth vice president.
- March 12 – Marques de Someruelos, captain-general of Cuba, issues a proclamation that causes 9,000 Francophone Saint-Domingue refugees to sail for New Orleans.
- May 5 – Mary Dixon Kies becomes the first recipient of a patent granted to a woman by the United States Patent and Trademark Office. She invented a technique of weaving straw with silk and thread.
- August – Following refitting, the USS Constitution ("Old Ironsides") is recommissioned as the flagship of the North Atlantic Squadron.
- October 11 – Along the Natchez Trace in Tennessee, explorer Meriwether Lewis dies under mysterious circumstances at an inn called Grinder's Stand. It is considered an alleged suicide though some evidence suggests murder.
- December 30 – Wearing masks at balls is forbidden in Boston, Massachusetts.

== Births ==
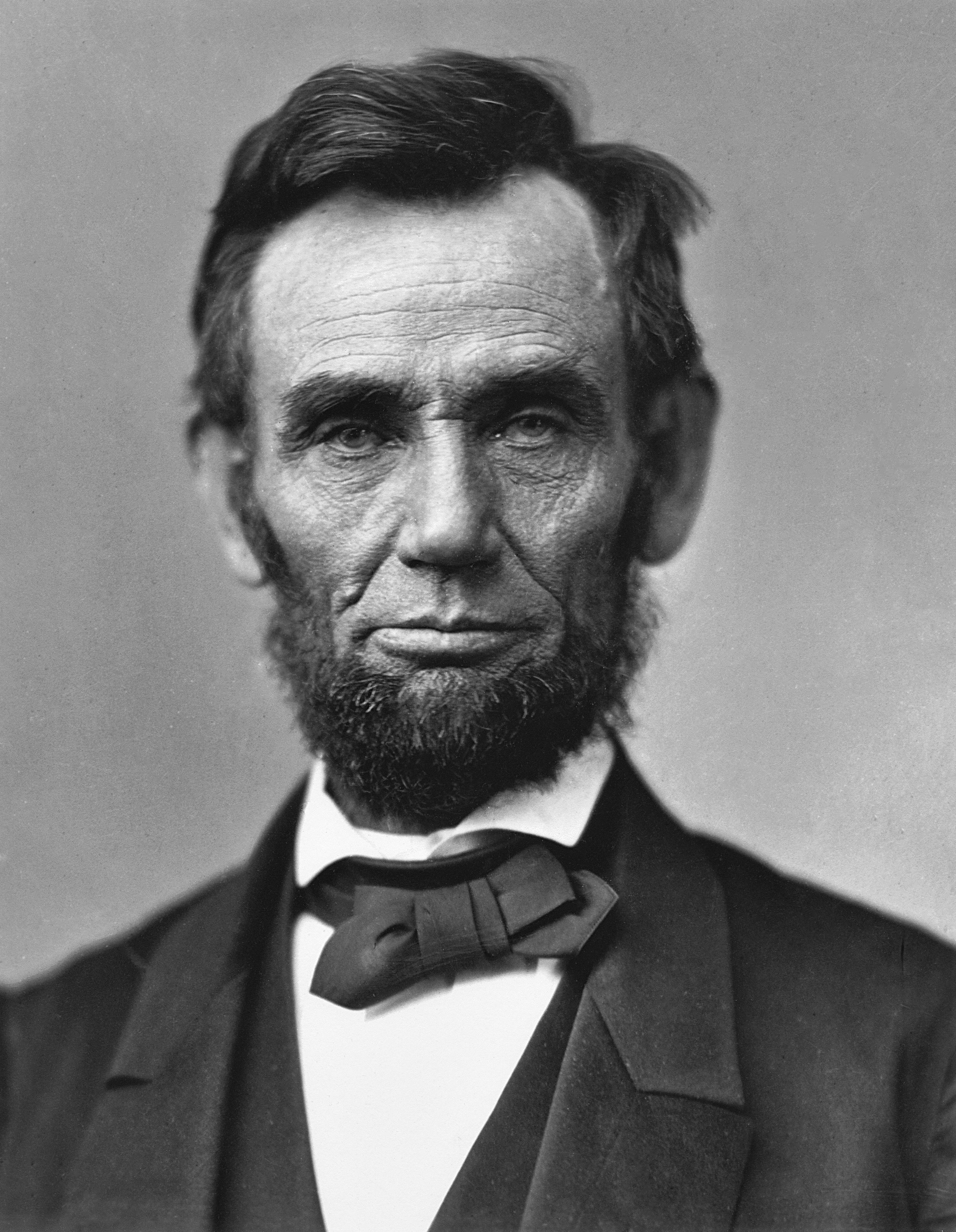
Abraham Lincoln

- January 18 – Richard C. Gatlin, Confederate Army general (died 1896)
- January 19 – Edgar Allan Poe, author, poet, editor and literary critic (died 1849)
- February 12 – Abraham Lincoln, 16th president of the United States from 1861 till 1865 (assassinated 1865)
- February 15 – Cyrus McCormick, businessman and inventor of the mechanical reaper (died 1884)
- February 20 – Henry W. Wessells, Union Army general (died 1889)
- March 1 – Robert Cornelius, pioneer of photography (died 1893)
- March 15 – Joseph Jenkins Roberts, 1st and 7th president of Liberia (died 1876 in Liberia)
- April 21 – Robert M. T. Hunter, Virginian lawyer, politician, 14th Speaker of the United States House of Representatives, 2nd Confederate States Secretary of State (died 1887)
- July 24 – Charles W. Cathcart, Portugal-born United States Senator from Indiana from 1845 to 1853 (died 1888)
- August 1 – William B. Travis, lieutenant colonel in the Texian Army (died 1836)
- August 15 – Albert Pike, Confederate military officer, attorney, writer, and Freemason (died 1891)
- August 27 – Hannibal Hamlin, the 15th vice president of the United States from 1861 to 1865 (died 1891)
- August 29 – Oliver Wendell Holmes Sr., physician, "fireside" poet and polymath (died 1894)
- September 20 – Sterling Price, 11th Governor of Missouri, United States Army brigadier general in the Mexican–American War, Confederate Army major general in the American Civil War (died 1867)
- September 21 – Sophia Hawthorne, painter and illustrator and wife of Nathaniel Hawthorne (died 1871)
- September 27 – Raphael Semmes, officer in the Confederate navy during the American Civil War (died 1877)
- October 11 – Orson Squire Fowler, phrenologist and leading proponent of the octagon house (died 1887)
- October 22 – Volney E. Howard, politician (died 1889)
- November 4 – Benjamin Robbins Curtis, Associate Justice of the Supreme Court of the United States (died 1874)
- November 13 – John A. Dahlgren, United States Navy officer, inventor of the Dahlgren gun (died 1870)
- November 23 – Horatio P. Van Cleve, Union army general (died 1891)
- December 3 – Thomas Alfred Davies, Union Army brigadier general (died 1899 in the United States)
- December 5 – Graham N. Fitch, United States Senator from Indiana from 1857 to 1861 (died 1892)
- December 10 – George Goldthwaite, United States Senator from Alabama from 1871 till 1877 (died 1879)

== Deaths ==
- January 20 – Thomson J. Skinner, politician (born 1752)
- January 21 – Josiah Hornblower, statesman and delegate for New Jersey in the Continental Congress in 1785 and 1786 (born 1729)
- March 6 – Thomas Heyward Jr., signer of the United States Declaration of Independence and of the Articles of Confederation (born 1746)
- April 6 – Hardy Murfree, soldier (born 1752)
- June 8 – Thomas Paine, political activist, philosopher, Founding Father of the United States and author of Common Sense (born 1737 in Great Britain)
- October 11 – Meriwether Lewis, leader of the Corps of Discovery (born 1774)
- November 4 – Gabriel Manigault, architect (born 1758)

== See also ==
- Timeline of United States history (1790–1819)
- Timeline of the Thomas Jefferson presidency § 1809
- Timeline of the James Madison presidency § 1809
