= Arthur Grover Rider =

American painter

- Born: March 21, 1886; Chicago, Illinois, U.S.
- Died: 1975 (aged 88–89)
- Education: Chicago Academy of Fine Arts
- Occupation: Painter

Arthur Grover Rider (March 21, 1886 – 1975) was an American painter.

Rider attended the School of the Art Institute of Chicago, in the city of his birth. In 1911, he attended classes there by Joaquín Sorolla and was greatly influenced by him. On Sorolla's departure, Rider travelled to the area where Sorolla worked, the coast around Valencia, and became a close follower. On his return to America, he painted mostly in the Mid West, California and Mexico.

Rider also had a long and successful career as a motion picture set designer.
