= Ruby Mining District =

Abandoned mining district in Washington, US

Coordinates: 48°30′08″N 119°44′14″W

Also known as the Salmon Creek District, the Ruby Mining District is an abandoned mining district in north central Washington State, founded in 1887 by Thomas D. Fuller. The principle mined ore was silver, though, copper, lead, and small amounts of gold were also extracted.

== History ==
The Moses Indian Reservation was opened to mining in 1886. Almost immediately after, prospectors began rushing into the Okanogan. Out of the many places, one of them was Ruby Mountain. In 1885, a prospector named Thomas D. Fuller built the first cabin in the area in which would later become the town of Ruby. This leads some to believe that he and possible others had been prospecting and mining in the area secretly for some time. He made the first discoveries in the area after the reservation's opening. Others, including Thomas Donan, William Milligan, and John Clonan also made some of the first discoveries.

In 1887, the district was officially named and designated by Fuller and several others. By this time, the Idaho, First Thought, Second Thought, Poorman, Ruby, Butte, Peacock, War Eagle, Fairview, and Lenora mines were in operation. Later mines include but are not limited to the Kansas, Fourth Of July, Arlington, Last Chance, Woo Loo Moo Loo, Keystone, Johnny Boy, Plant-Callahan, Sonny Boy, Hughes, and Nevada. Some explorational digs and smaller mines remain uncharted and/or unrecorded.

In 1893, the price of silver fell to $0.63 an ounce, combined with diminishing silver concentrations the further in they dug, the mines began shutting down after a mere three months of operation that year. Despite the fact silver still existed, it was simply no longer profitable work mining and refining the ore.

== Production ==
The most productive/profitable of the mines were the Fourth Of July, and Arlington mines. Other high producers were the Last Chance, First Thought, and Peacock mines. The years from 1889-1893 were the most productive for the district. Accurate records of production were sparsely created, thus it is unknown the exact amount of output and earnings. An estimated $200,000 worth of silver was mined from the above listed most productive mines around 1890, excluding the Peacock Mine. After the district wide shut down of all the mines, the Arlington Mine was reopened for a brief two years, from 1937–1939, in which made profits of $71,683. The Fourth Of July Mine was also reopened, from 1958-1964. This operation earned a small amount of about $12,000. Unfortunately, records of the all together production/profits cannot be located, and individual records are hard to come by.

== The District Today ==
Today, the district remains abandoned, though rumors of plans to reopen the Fourth Of July Mine have been circulated, though no real developments have occurred. What is left of the mines is unprotected, meaning they are still open. Although, the Peacock Mine is gated at both adits, and the shafts are guarded by chain link fencing. Other than the Peacock, the mines are left unregulated. Many of which have collapsed. Collapsed mines or mines with a caved entrance include but are not limited to the Kansas, Nevada, Arlington, and Idaho mines. Flooded mines include but are not limited to the Fourth Of July, Idaho, Poorman, and Last Chance mines. Due to infrequent inspection of the mines, there is no data of the status of most of the mines. We can only rely on ones who have explored these mines themselves. For instance, a recent expedition revealed the above data. The Poorman Mine is reported in good condition, besides high iron content water collecting on the floor of the mine, there is no evidence suggesting much has occurred within the mine. Water seepage can be responsible for structural weakening though, and oxygen deprivation. Water can also cover up a winze, which is a shaft within the mine, or entrap dangerous gases in which are released upon disturbing of the surface tension. Always use caution when exploring an abandoned mine.
