= Milton H. Mabry =

American lawyer and politician (1851–1919)

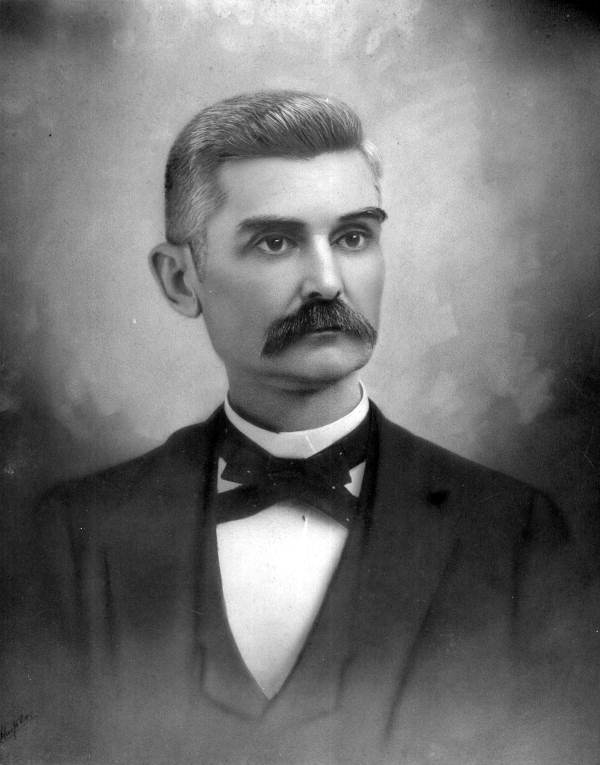
Milton Mabry, between 1891 and 1903

Milton Harvey Mabry (born Pickens County, Alabama, June 17, 1851; died Tampa, Florida, March 3, 1919) was an American lawyer, politician, and judge. He served as both the eighth Lieutenant Governor of Florida and chief justice of the Florida Supreme Court.

== Biography ==
Mabry's father was a merchant; the family moved from Alabama to DeSoto Parish, Louisiana in 1856 and then in 1860 to Lee County, Mississippi. Around 1868 he entered the University of Mississippi at Oxford, transferring to the law school of Cumberland University in Lebanon, Tennessee around 1870, graduating in 1872.

Returning to Mississippi, Mabry served a term as the mayor of Tupelo. He met fellow lawyer William Adams Hocker there and in 1879, in a period of ill health, he followed Hocker to Leesburg, Florida, to become his law partner. In 1882 Mabry served as a state representative from Sumter County. In 1884 Mabry was picked as a running mate by gubernatorial candidate Edward A. Perry, and after a successful campaign Mabry served as lieutenant governor from 1885 to 1889. The 1885 Florida constitution abolished the office of lieutenant governor, so Mabry was the last to serve until the office was revived in the 1968 constitution.

Mabry practiced law briefly and then ran for a position on the Florida Supreme Court in 1890. He joined the court in 1891; from 1895 to 1897 he was chief justice. Mabry declined re-election in 1902, leaving office in early 1903. His former law partner William Hocker served on the court from 1903 to 1915. Mabry returned to the court as clerk from 1905 to 1915 until ill health forced him to retire.

Mabry's son Dale Mabry (1891–1922) was a World War I aviator who died in the crash of the dirigible Roma; the Dale Mabry Highway in Tampa is named in his honor. Another son, Giddings Eldon Mabry (1877–1968), was a prominent Tampa real estate attorney and developer, and the founder of the law firm Carlton Fields.

Political offices
Preceded by Livingston W. Bethel	Lieutenant Governor of Florida; 1885–1889	Succeeded by Office abolished from 1889 to 1969; Ray Osborne
