= John Hopkins (South Carolina politician) =

American politician

22nd Lieutenant Governor of South Carolina
- In office December 9, 1806 – December 10, 1808
- Governor: Charles Pinckney
- Preceded by: Thomas Sumter Jr.
- Succeeded by: Frederick Nance

Personal details
- Born: 1765
- Died: 1832 (aged 66–67)
- Party: Democratic-Republican
- Spouse: Amy Goodwyn June (m. 1788)

John Hopkins (1765–1832) was the 22nd lieutenant governor of South Carolina from December 1806 until 1808.

He attended the First South Carolina Provincial Congress from Richland County, South Carolina.

He married Amy Goodwyn June 22, 1788. They had several children.

He was the son John Hopkins (1739–1775). The family had an indigo plantation. After the fall of Charleston in 1780, Hopkins fought in the Revolutionary Army joining at age of fifteen. He was captured, paroled, and reenlisted, and served until 1782. He was granted land on Cabin Branch in 1790, and built a house there that came to be known as the Cabin Branch Plantation at Adams’ Pond.

Hopkins had various governmental offices including tax collector, justice of the peace, and was a Richland County, South Carolina district judge. He served as Lieutenant Governor with Governor Charles Pinckney. He also became commissioner of free schools, was a trustee of South Carolina College (now the University of South Carolina), and was a director at the Bank of South Carolina and Planters and Merchants Bank of South Carolina. He was also a state legislator representing the Richland District in the South Carolina Senate from 1810 until 1818.

The family cemetery is listed on the National Register of Historic Places.

== See also ==
- List of lieutenant governors of South Carolina

Political offices
Preceded by Thomas Sumter, Jr.	Lieutenant Governor of South Carolina; 1806–1808	Succeeded by Frederick Nance
