= Cabell R. Berry =

American politician

Cabell R. Berry in 1885

Cabell Rives Berry (July 4, 1848 – August 27, 1910) was the Speaker of the Tennessee Senate from 1885 to 1887.

== Biography ==
Berry was born in Amherst County, Virginia, on July 4, 1848. He was raised on a plantation and educated at Higginbotham Academy, a preparatory school of the University of Virginia.

At the age of 16 Berry joined the Confederate army and fought in the American Civil War, attached to Gray's Battery. After the war, Berry moved to Tennessee and worked for the Tennessee, Virginia, and Georgia Railroad. In 1868 he came to Middle Tennessee and taught in the Davidson County schools, after which he studied law in the office of John C. Burch, of Nashville, and was admitted to the bar. He then moved to Williamson County and was elected County Superintendent. In 1878, he married Mary Oden, daughter of Col. Thomas Oden of Williamson County.

Berry was elected to the Tennessee House of Representatives as a Democrat in 1883, representing Williamson and Maury Counties. In 1885, he was elected to the Tennessee Senate, where he was named as Speaker. He was one of the youngest members of the Senate when elected. He finished his term in 1887 and was then elected to a new term in 1889. Berry retired from the Senate in 1891 and then served three terms as mayor of Franklin, Tennessee. After serving as mayor, Berry continued to practice law until his death. He died at home in Franklin on August 27, 1910, and is buried at Mt. Hope Cemetery.
