= Livingston W. Bethel =

American politician

Livingstone Wellesley Bethel (born Nassau, New Providence, Bahamas, 26 October 1845; died Key West, Florida, October 21, 1914) was an American lawyer, judge, politician, and the seventh Lieutenant Governor of Florida 1881 to 1885.

Bethel's family moved to Key West when he was 2; his father, Winer Bethel (1816-1877), was a lawyer who later served as a circuit court judge and was elected mayor of Key West in the early 1870s. L. W. Bethel attended school in Key West and at Walnut Hill Military Academy, Geneva, NY. He studied law with Homer G. Plant and was admitted to the bar in 1869. Bethel was elected mayor of Key West, 1877–1880. William D. Bloxham selected him as his running mate on the Democratic ticket in 1880 and he served as Lieutenant Governor 1881–4. Bethel served as District Attorney 1884-9 and Criminal Court judge 1895–1911. He was the first Circuit Court Judge in the new 11th Judicial Circuit, 1911–14. Bethel suffered a long illness in his final year on the court, leading ultimately to open calls for his resignation shortly before his death.

Bethel was the great-grandfather of Harry Bethel, a former Key West city commissioner; a bust of L. W. Bethel was placed in the Key West Memorial Sculpture Garden in 2002.

Political offices
Preceded by Noble A. Hull	Lieutenant Governor of Florida; 1881–1885	Succeeded by Milton H. Mabry
