= Martin House (Seekonk, Massachusetts) =

Historic house in Massachusetts, United States

- U.S. National Register of Historic Places
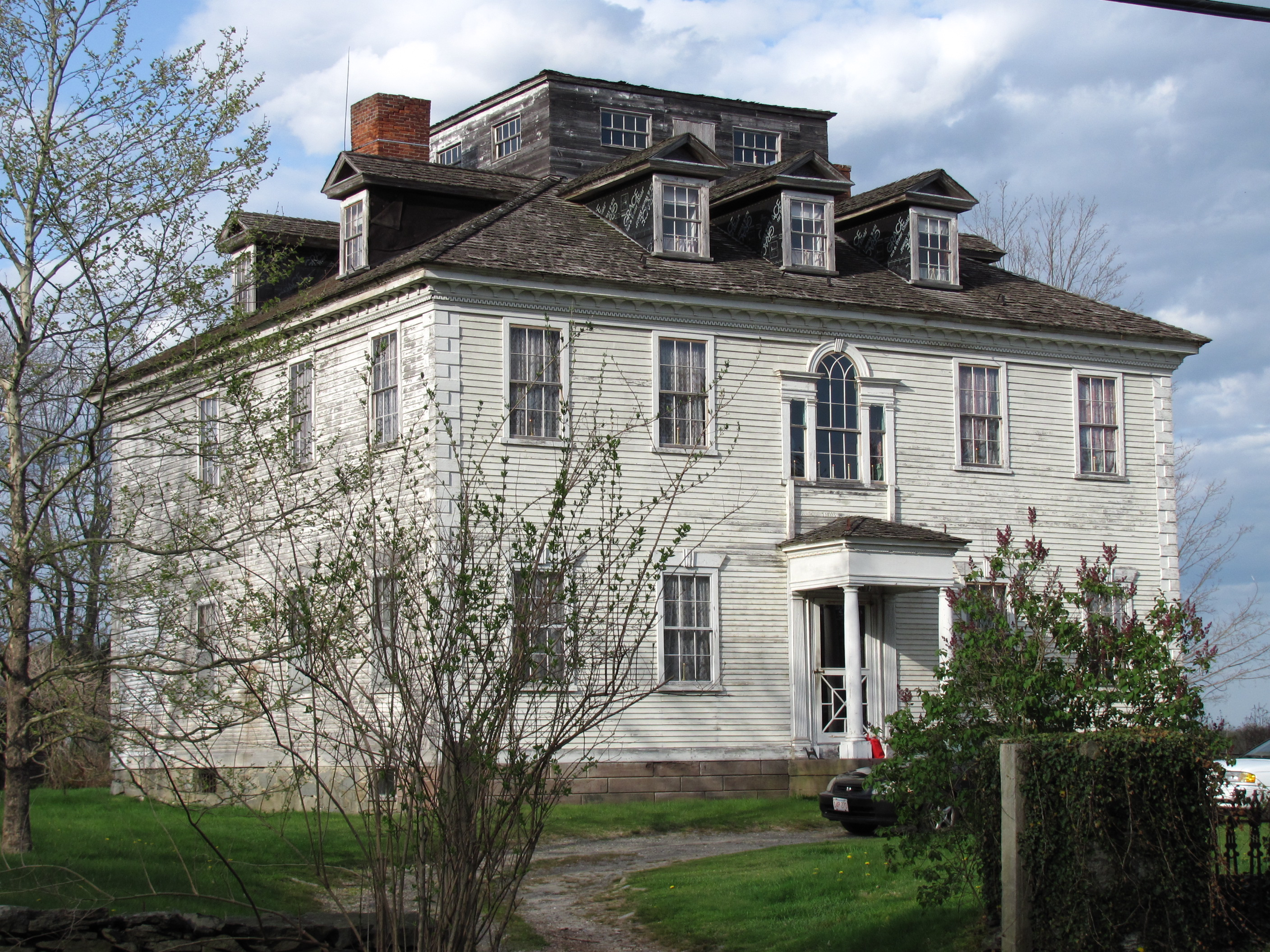
- Martin House in 2010

- Location within Massachusetts Location within the United States
- Location: 940 County Street, Seekonk, Massachusetts
- Coordinates: 41°48′50″N 71°17′54″W
- Built: 1799
- Architectural style: Federal
- NRHP reference No.: 74000365
- Added to NRHP: May 2, 1974

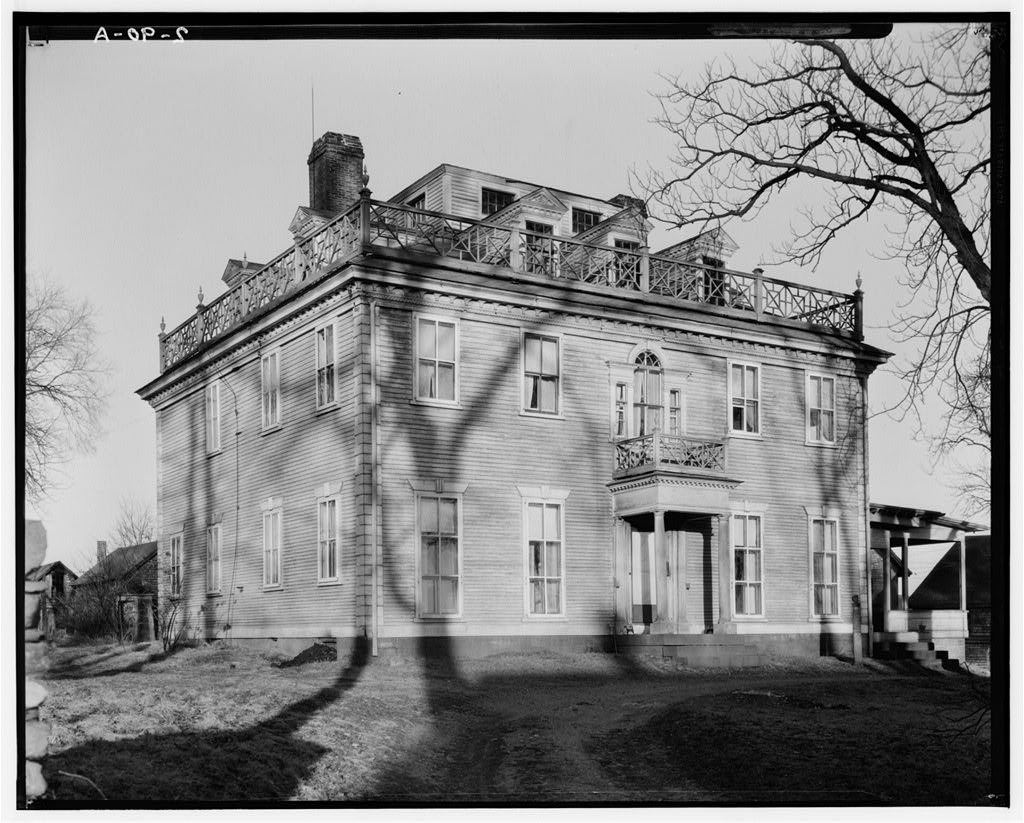
Martin House in 1935

The Martin House is a historic house in Seekonk, Massachusetts, United States.

The house is a frame structure with clapboard exterior. It is two and a half stories, plus an 18-foot square monitor above. It has an entrance porch with two Doric columns. There are eight rooms distributed around a central hall plan. The house was built c. 1799–1801, and is stylistically similar to houses built at the time in Newport, Rhode Island. It was listed on the National Register of Historic Places in 1974.

== Simeon Martin ==
Simeon Martin (October 20, 1754 – September 3, 1819) was born to an old family who had lived in Rehoboth for five generations, going back to 1665.

Martin was a captain in Christopher Lippitt's regiment in the American Revolutionary War. He fought at the Battle of Trenton with George Washington. After Newport was evacuated by the British in 1779, Martin lived in Newport.

He served as the commander of the Rhode Island Militia with the rank of major general from May 1793 to May 1802. He represented Newport in the General Assembly,and was Lieutenant Governor of Rhode Island for seven nonconsecutive one year terms, serving from 1808 to 1810 and 1811–1816. He also served as a Trustee of Brown University from 1794 to until his death in 1819.

Martin is buried at Burial Place Hill in Rehoboth, not far from this home. His epitaph, at 405 words, is claimed to be the longest in the United States and possibly the world.

== See also ==
- National Register of Historic Places listings in Bristol County, Massachusetts
