= James R. Hindman =

American politician

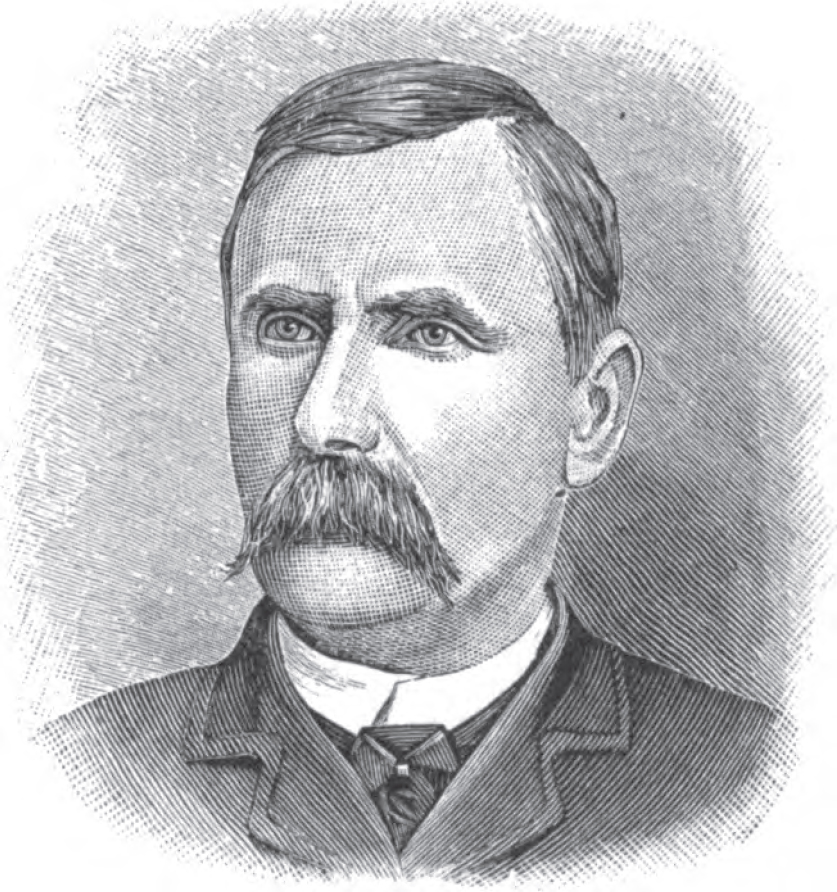

23rd Lieutenant Governor of Kentucky
- In office September 4, 1883 – August 30, 1887
- Governor: J. Proctor Knott
- Preceded by: James E. Cantrill
- Succeeded by: James William Bryan

Member of the Kentucky House of Representatives from Adair County
- In office February 19, 1880 – August 1, 1881
- Preceded by: John Tupman
- Succeeded by: M. H. Rhorer
- In office August 7, 1865 – August 7, 1871
- Preceded by: James T. Bramlette
- Succeeded by: James Garnett

Personal details
- Born: James Robert Hindman; February 4, 1839 Adair County, Kentucky, U.S.
- Died: October 12, 1912 (aged 73) Columbia, Kentucky, U.S.
- Party: Democratic

James Robert Hindman (February 4, 1839 – October 12, 1912) was an American politician who served as the 23rd lieutenant governor of Kentucky under J. Proctor Knott from 1883 to 1887.

He was born in Adair County, Kentucky in 1839. In 1883, he ran for and was elected Lieutenant Governor of Kentucky, serving a full four-year term under Governor J. Proctor Knott, a Democrat.

The city of Hindman in Knott County, Kentucky is named after him.

== Sources ==
- James Robert Hindman entry at The Political Graveyard

Political offices
Preceded by James E. Cantrill	Lieutenant Governor of Kentucky; 1883–1887	Succeeded by James William Bryan
