= G. D. Shands =

American lawyer (1844–1917)

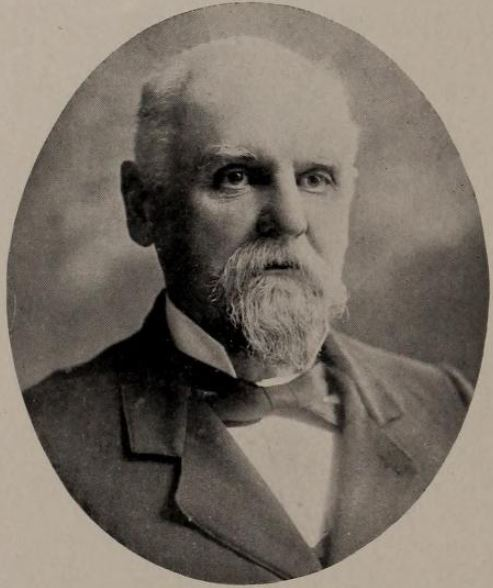
- 1897

11th Lieutenant Governor of Mississippi
- In office January 1882 – January 1890
- Governor: Robert Lowry
- Preceded by: William Henry Sims
- Succeeded by: M. M. Evans

Member of the Mississippi House of Representatives from the Tate County district
- In office January 1876 – January 1880 Serving with William H. Bizzell (1878-1880); Thomas B. Garrett (1876-1878)
- Preceded by: T. S. Tate; Thomas B. Garrett
- Succeeded by: H. F. Bowman; B. R. Chambliss

Personal details
- Born: December 5, 1844 Spartanburg District, South Carolina, U.S.
- Died: July 1, 1917 (aged 72) New Orleans, Louisiana, U.S.
- Party: Democratic
- Spouse: Mary Roseborough (m. 1870-1917, his death)
- Children: 5

Garvin Dugas Shands (December 5, 1844 - July 1, 1917) was an American lawyer, professor, and Democratic politician. He was the Lieutenant Governor of Mississippi from 1882 to 1890 and a member of the Mississippi House of Representatives from 1876 to 1880.

== Early life ==
Garvin Dugas Shands was born on December 5, 1844, in Burnt Factory, Spartanburg District, South Carolina, and was raised in the family home there. He was the oldest son of South Carolina natives Dr. Anthony Capel Shands (1815 or 1816 - 1876) and Frances Jane (Ferguson) Shands, his wife. Shands began attending Wofford College in 1859. When the American Civil War began in 1861, Shands enlisted at the age of 17 in Manigault's Battalion in the Confederate Army. At the end of the year, he was transferred to the 6th South Carolina Cavalry Regiment. His unit helped guard the Port of Charleston until May 1864, when they were transferred to the command of General Wade Hampton. Shands was among Hampton's and Joseph E. Johnston's troops during the surrender in April 1865 in Bennett Place in Durham, North Carolina. He then returned to Wofford College in the same year, graduating with a B. A. in 1866. In 1867, Shands moved to Panola County, Mississippi, where he was a teacher and also read law, and lived there for two years before moving to Tate County, Mississippi, in 1869. He then attended the University of Kentucky, graduating in January 1870 with a Bachelor of Laws degree.

== Career ==
After graduating, Shands opened a law office in Senatobia, Mississippi, and his law practice grew. He was elected to represent Tate County as a Democrat in the Mississippi House of Representatives in 1875 and reelected in 1877, serving from 1876 to 1880. In 1881, Shands was elected to the office of Lieutenant Governor of Mississippi and served from 1882 to 1886. In 1885, he was re-elected and served a second term from 1886 to 1890. From 1890 to 1894, Shands was a trustee of both Vanderbilt University and Millsaps College. In 1894, Shands accepted the position of dean of the University of Mississippi School of Law and also served there as a law professor. He received an honorary L. L. D. from Wofford in 1897. In October 1906, Shands accepted a position as a professor of common law at Tulane University. Shands retired in 1909, and was granted a retirement allowance by the Carnegie Foundation for the Advancement of Teaching.

== Later life ==
Shands was a member of the Methodist Church and served as a delegate to its national conventions in 1882, 1886, 1890, 1894, and 1906. He married Mary Endosia Roseborough on December 14, 1870. They had five children together: Hubert Anthony Shands (1872-1955; an English professor and author), Mabel I., Audley W., Harley R., and Cecil. Shands died in New Orleans, Louisiana, on July 1, 1917. His widow Mary died on October 7, 1934.
