= 1885 in the United States =

- Decades: 1860s; 1870s; 1880s; 1890s; 1900s
- See also: History of the United States (1865–1918); Timeline of United States history (1860–1899); List of years in the United States

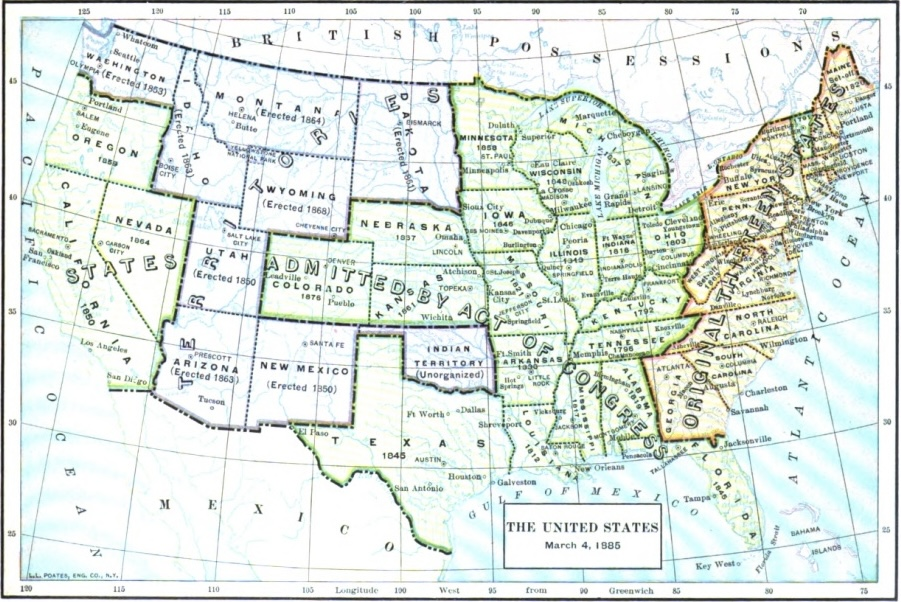
Map of the United States in 1885 by Albert Bushnell Hart

Events from the year 1885 in the United States.

== Incumbents ==
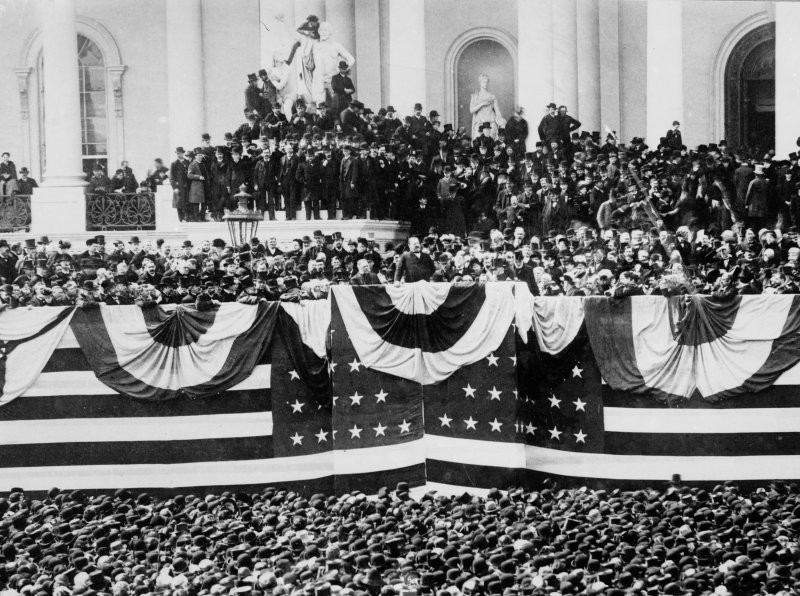
March 4: First inauguration of Grover Cleveland

=== Federal government ===
- President:

Chester A. Arthur (R-New York) (until March 4)
Grover Cleveland (D-New York) (starting March 4)

- Vice President:

vacant (until March 4)
Thomas A. Hendricks (D-Indiana) (March 4 – November 25)
vacant (starting November 25)

- Chief Justice: Morrison Waite (Ohio)
- Speaker of the House of Representatives: John G. Carlisle (D-Kentucky)
- Congress: 48th (until March 4), 49th (starting March 4)

==== State governments ====
Governors and lieutenant governors

=== Governors ===
- Governor of Alabama: Edward A. O'Neal (Democratic)
- Governor of Arkansas: James Henderson Berry (Democratic) (until January 17), Simon Pollard Hughes, Jr. (Democratic) (starting January 17)
- Governor of California: George Stoneman (Republican)
- Governor of Colorado: James Benton Grant (Democratic) (until January 13), Benjamin Harrison Eaton (Republican) (starting January 13)
- Governor of Connecticut: Thomas M. Waller (Democratic) (until January 8), Henry B. Harrison (Republican) (starting January 8)
- Governor of Delaware: Charles C. Stockley (Democratic)
- Governor of Florida: William D. Bloxham (Democratic) (until January 7), Edward A. Perry (Democratic) (starting January 7)
- Governor of Georgia: Henry D. McDaniel (Democratic)
- Governor of Illinois: John Marshall Hamilton (Republican) (until January 30), Richard J. Oglesby (Republican) (starting January 30)
- Governor of Indiana: Albert G. Porter (Republican) (until January 12), Isaac P. Gray (Democratic) (starting January 12)
- Governor of Iowa: Buren R. Sherman (Republican)
- Governor of Kansas: George W. Glick (Democratic) (until January 12), John A. Martin (Republican) (starting January 12)
- Governor of Kentucky: J. Proctor Knott (Democratic)
- Governor of Louisiana: Samuel D. McEnery (Democratic)
- Governor of Maine: Frederick Robie (Republican)
- Governor of Maryland: Robert Milligan McLane (Democratic) (until March 27), Henry Lloyd (Democratic) (starting March 27)
- Governor of Massachusetts: George D. Robinson (Republican)
- Governor of Michigan: Josiah Begole (Democratic) (until January 1), Russell Alger (Republican) (starting January 1)
- Governor of Minnesota: Lucius F. Hubbard (Republican)
- Governor of Mississippi: Robert Lowry (Democratic)
- Governor of Missouri: Thomas Theodore Crittenden (Democratic) (until January 12), John S. Marmaduke (Democratic) (starting January 12)
- Governor of Nebraska: James W. Dawes (Republican)
- Governor of Nevada: Jewett W. Adams (Democratic)
- Governor of New Hampshire: Samuel W. Hale (Republican) (until June 4), Moody Currier (Republican) (starting June 4)
- Governor of New Jersey: Leon Abbett (Democratic)
- Governor of New York: Grover Cleveland (Democratic) (until January 6), David B. Hill (Democratic) (starting January 6)
- Governor of North Carolina: Thomas Jordan Jarvis (Democratic) (until January 21), Alfred Moore Scales (Democratic) (starting January 21)
- Governor of Ohio: George Hoadly (Democratic)
- Governor of Oregon: Z. F. Moody (Republican)
- Governor of Pennsylvania: Robert E. Pattison (Democratic)
- Governor of Rhode Island: Augustus O. Bourn (Republican) (until May 26), George P. Wetmore (Republican) (starting May 26)
- Governor of South Carolina: Hugh Smith Thompson (Democratic)
- Governor of Tennessee: William B. Bate (Democratic)
- Governor of Texas: John Ireland (Democratic)
- Governor of Vermont: Samuel E. Pingree (Republican)
- Governor of Virginia: William E. Cameron (Re-adjuster)
- Governor of West Virginia: Jacob B. Jackson (Democratic) (until March 4), Emanuel Willis Wilson (Democratic) (starting March 4)
- Governor of Wisconsin: Jeremiah McLain Rusk (Republican)

=== Lieutenant governors ===
- Lieutenant Governor of California: John Daggett (Democratic)
- Lieutenant Governor of Colorado: William H. Meyer (Republican) (until January 13), Peter W. Breene (Republican) (starting January 13)
- Lieutenant Governor of Connecticut: George G. Sumner (Democratic) (until January 8), Lorrin A. Cooke (Republican) (starting January 8)
- Lieutenant Governor of Florida: Livingston W. Bethel (Democratic) (until January 7), Milton H. Mabry (Democratic) (starting January 7)
- Lieutenant Governor of Illinois: William J. Campbell (Republican) (until January 30), John Smith (Republican) (starting January 30)
- Lieutenant Governor of Indiana: Thomas Hanna (Republican) (until January 12), Mahlon Dickerson Manson (Democratic) (starting January 12)
- Lieutenant Governor of Iowa: Orlando H. Manning (Republican)
- Lieutenant Governor of Kansas: David Wesley Finney (Republican) (until January 12), Alexander P. Riddle (Republican) (starting January 12)
- Lieutenant Governor of Kentucky: James R. Hindman (Democratic)
- Lieutenant Governor of Louisiana: Clay Knobloch (Democratic)
- Lieutenant Governor of Massachusetts: Oliver Ames (Democratic)
- Lieutenant Governor of Michigan: Moreau S. Crosby (Republican) (until month and day unknown), Archibald Buttars (Republican) (starting month and day unknown)
- Lieutenant Governor of Minnesota: Charles A. Gilman (Republican)
- Lieutenant Governor of Mississippi: G. D. Shands (Democratic)
- Lieutenant Governor of Missouri: Robert Alexander Campbell (Democratic) (until January 12), Albert P. Morehouse (Democratic) (starting January 12)
- Lieutenant Governor of Nebraska: Alfred W. Agee (Republican) (until month and day unknown), Hibbard H. Shedd (Republican) (starting month and day unknown)
- Lieutenant Governor of Nevada: Charles E. Laughton (Republican)
- Lieutenant Governor of New York:
  - until January 6: David B. Hill (Republican)
  - January 6 to end of December 31: Dennis McCarthy (Republican)
- Lieutenant Governor of North Carolina: James L. Robinson (Democratic) (until January 21), Charles M. Stedman (Democratic) (starting January 21)
- Lieutenant Governor of Ohio: John George Warwick (Democratic)
- Lieutenant Governor of Pennsylvania: Chauncey Forward Black (Democratic)
- Lieutenant Governor of Rhode Island: Oscar Rathbun (political party unknown) (until May 26), Lucius B. Darling (Republican) (starting May 26)
- Lieutenant Governor of Pennsylvania: Chauncey Forward Black (Democratic)
- Lieutenant Governor of South Carolina: John Calhoun Sheppard (Democratic)
- Lieutenant Governor of Tennessee: Benjamin F. Alexander (Democratic) (until month and day unknown), Cabell R. Berry (Democratic) (starting month and day unknown)
- Lieutenant Governor of Texas: Francis M. Martin (Democratic) (until month and day unknown), Barnett Gibbs (Democratic) (starting month and day unknown)
- Lieutenant Governor of Vermont: Ebenezer J. Ormsbee (Republican)
- Lieutenant Governor of Virginia: John F. Lewis (Republican)
- Lieutenant Governor of Wisconsin: Sam S. Fifield (Republican)

== Events ==
March 4: Grover Cleveland becomes the 22nd U.S. president

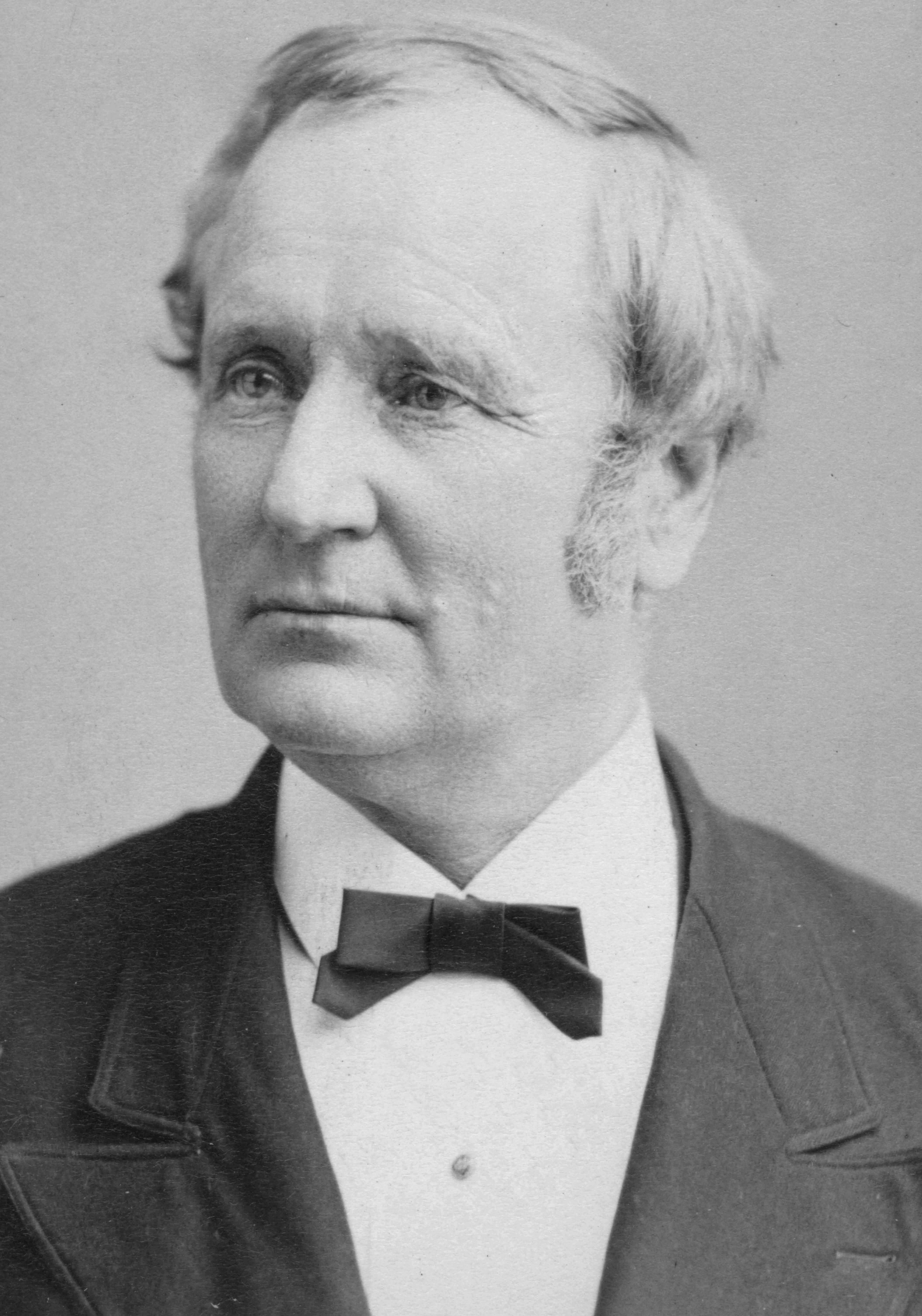
Thomas A. Hendricks becomes the 21st U.S. vice president

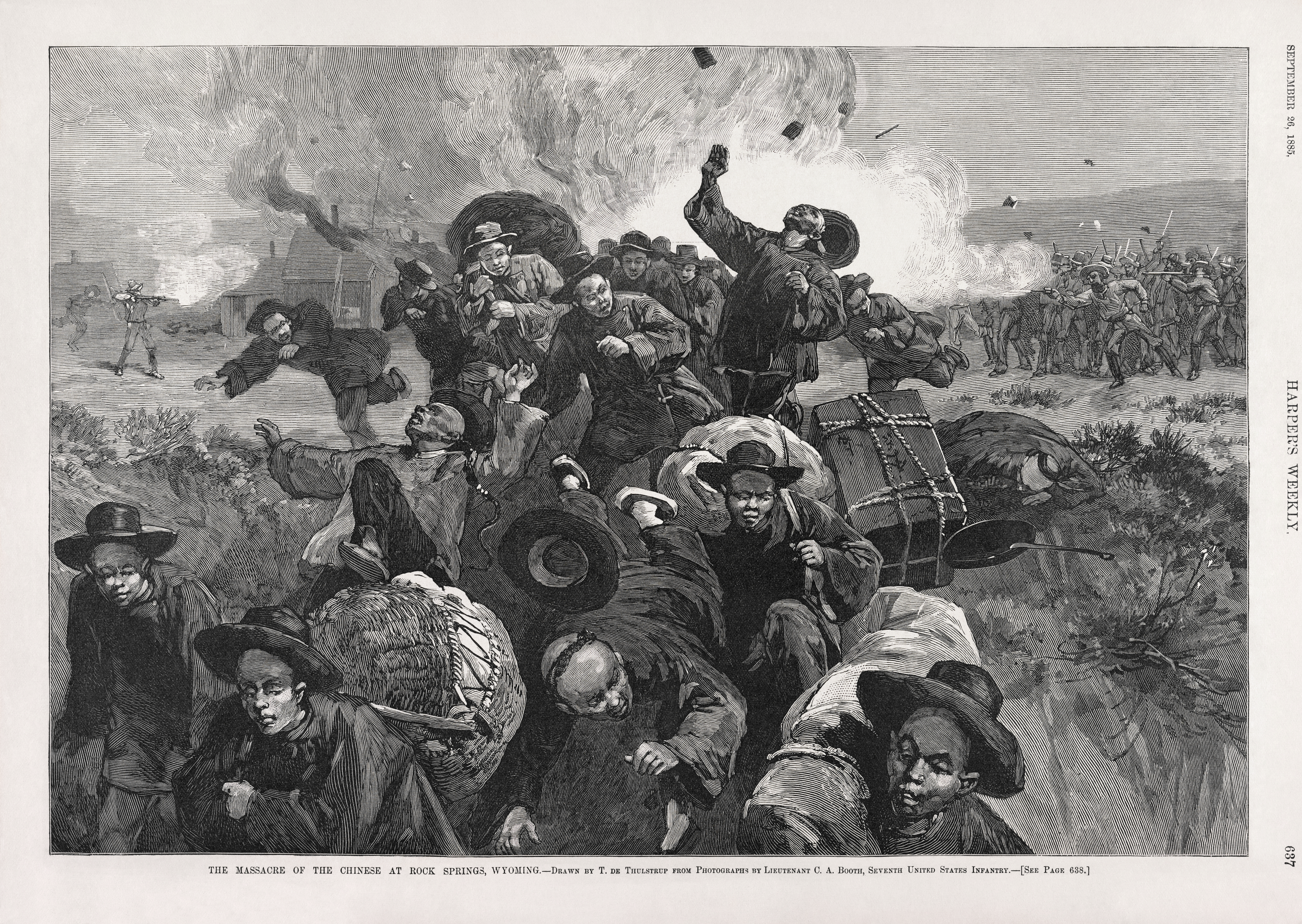
September 2: Rock Springs massacre

=== January–March ===
- February 9 – The first Japanese arrive in Hawaii.
- February 16 – Charles Dow publishes the first edition of the Dow Jones Industrial Average. The index stands at a level of 62.76, and represents the dollar average of 14 stocks: 12 railroads and two leading American industries.
- February 18 – Mark Twain publishes Adventures of Huckleberry Finn in the United States.
- February 21 – United States President Chester A. Arthur dedicates the Washington Monument.
- March 3 – A subsidiary of the American Bell Telephone Company, American Telephone and Telegraph (AT&T), is incorporated in New York.
- March 4 – Grover Cleveland is sworn in as the 22nd president of the United States, and Thomas A. Hendricks is sworn in as the 21st vice president.

=== April–June ===
- April 30
  - A bill is signed in the New York State legislature forming the Niagara Falls State Park.
  - Boston Pops Orchestra is formed.
- May – The Depression of 1882–85 ends.
- June 17 – The Statue of Liberty arrives in New York Harbor.

=== July–September ===
- July 11 – San Diego Building and Loan Association founded, predecessor of Great American Bank.
- July 14 – Sarah E. Goode is the first female African-American to apply for and receive a patent, for the invention of the hideaway bed.
- July 23 – Former president and Civil War general Ulysses S. Grant dies in Mount McGregor, New York.
- August 25 – Author Laura Ingalls marries farmer Almanzo Wilder in Dakota Territory.
- September 2 – The Rock Springs massacre occurs in Rock Springs, Wyoming; 150 white miners attack their Chinese coworkers, killing 28, wounding 15, and forcing several hundred more out of town.
- September 8 – Saint Thomas Academy is founded in Minnesota as a seminary.

=== October–December ===
- October 10 – Removal of Hell Gate rocks: In the East River of New York City, the U.S. Army Corps of Engineers sets off the largest ever explosion for a non-military purpose.
- October 13 – The Georgia Institute of Technology is established in Atlanta, Georgia as the Georgia School of Technology.
- November 25 – Vice President Thomas A. Hendricks dies in office.
- December 1 – Dr Pepper is served for the very first time (as acknowledged by the U.S. Patent Office; the exact date of Dr Pepper's invention is unknown).

=== Undated ===
- The first skyscraper (the Home Insurance Building) is built in Chicago, Illinois (10 floors).
- Michigan Technological University (originally Michigan Mining School) opens its doors for the first time in what is to become the Houghton County Fire Hall.
- Camp Dudley, the oldest continually running boys' camp in America, is founded.

=== Ongoing ===
- Gilded Age (1869–c. 1896)
- Depression of 1882–85 (1882–1885)

== Sport ==
- August 29 – John L. Sullivan becomes first World Heavyweight Boxing Champion.
- September 30 – The Chicago White Stockings clinch their Third National League pennant with a 2–1 win over the New York Giants.

== Births ==
- January 7 – Edwin Swatek, swimmer and water polo player (died 1966)
- January 11 – Alice Paul, suffragist (died 1977)
- January 15 – Grover Lowdermilk, baseball player (died 1968)
- January 27
  - Jerome Kern, musical theater composer (died 1945)
  - Harry Ruby, musician, composer and writer (died 1974)
- February 7 – Sinclair Lewis fiction writer, recipient of Nobel Prize in Literature in 1930 (died 1951 in Italy)
- February 13 – Bess Truman, First Lady of the United States, Second Lady of the United States (died 1982)
- February 17 – Steve Evans, baseball player (died 1943)
- February 18 – Richard S. Edwards, admiral (died 1956)
- March 6 – Ring Lardner, writer (died 1933)
- April 1 – Wallace Beery, actor (died 1949)
- April 7 – Bee Ho Gray, Wild West star, silent film actor and vaudeville performer (died 1951)
- April 13 – Vean Gregg, baseball player (died 1964)
- May 2
  - Hedda Hopper, columnist (died 1966)
  - Lee W. Stanley, cartoonist (died 1970)
- May 7 – George "Gabby" Hayes, Western film character actor (died 1969)
- May 14 – Ben J. Tarbutton, businessman and politician (died 1962)
- May 30 – Arthur E. Andersen, accountant (died 1947)
- June 29 – Andrew Tombes, comedian and character actor (died 1976)
- July 4 – Louis B. Mayer, film producer (died 1957)
- July 6 – Charles Wisner Barrell, writer (died 1974)
- July 10 – Mary O'Hara, author and screenwriter (died 1980)
- July 15 – Tom Kennedy, actor (died 1965)
- July 22 – John Thomas Kennedy, general and Medal Honour recipient (died 1969)
- August 15 – Edna Ferber, novelist, short story writer, and playwright (died 1968)
- September 7 – Elinor Wylie (Elinor Morton Hoyt), poet and novelist (died 1928)
- September 11 – Julian C. Smith, general (died 1975)
- September 15 – James P. Boyle, politician (died 1939)
- September 22 – George Gaul, actor (died 1939)
- October 3 – Sophie Treadwell, dramatist and journalist (died 1970)
- October 9 – Raymond DeWalt, inventor and businessman (died 1961)
- October 30 – Ezra Pound, poet (died 1972 in Italy)
- November 1 – Edgar J. Kaufmann, merchant and patron of Fallingwater (died 1955)
- November 11 – George S. Patton, General (died 1945 in Heidelberg, Germany)
- November 28 – John Willard, playwright and actor (d. 1942)
- December 2 – George Minot, physiologist, recipient of Nobel Prize in Physiology or Medicine in 1934 (died 1950)
- December 6 – Ernest Palmer, cinematographer (died 1978)
- December 10 – Elizabeth Baker, economist and academic (died 1973)
- December 19 – King Oliver, jazz cornet player and bandleader (died 1938)
- December 26 – Bazoline Estelle Usher, African American educator (died 1992)

== Deaths ==
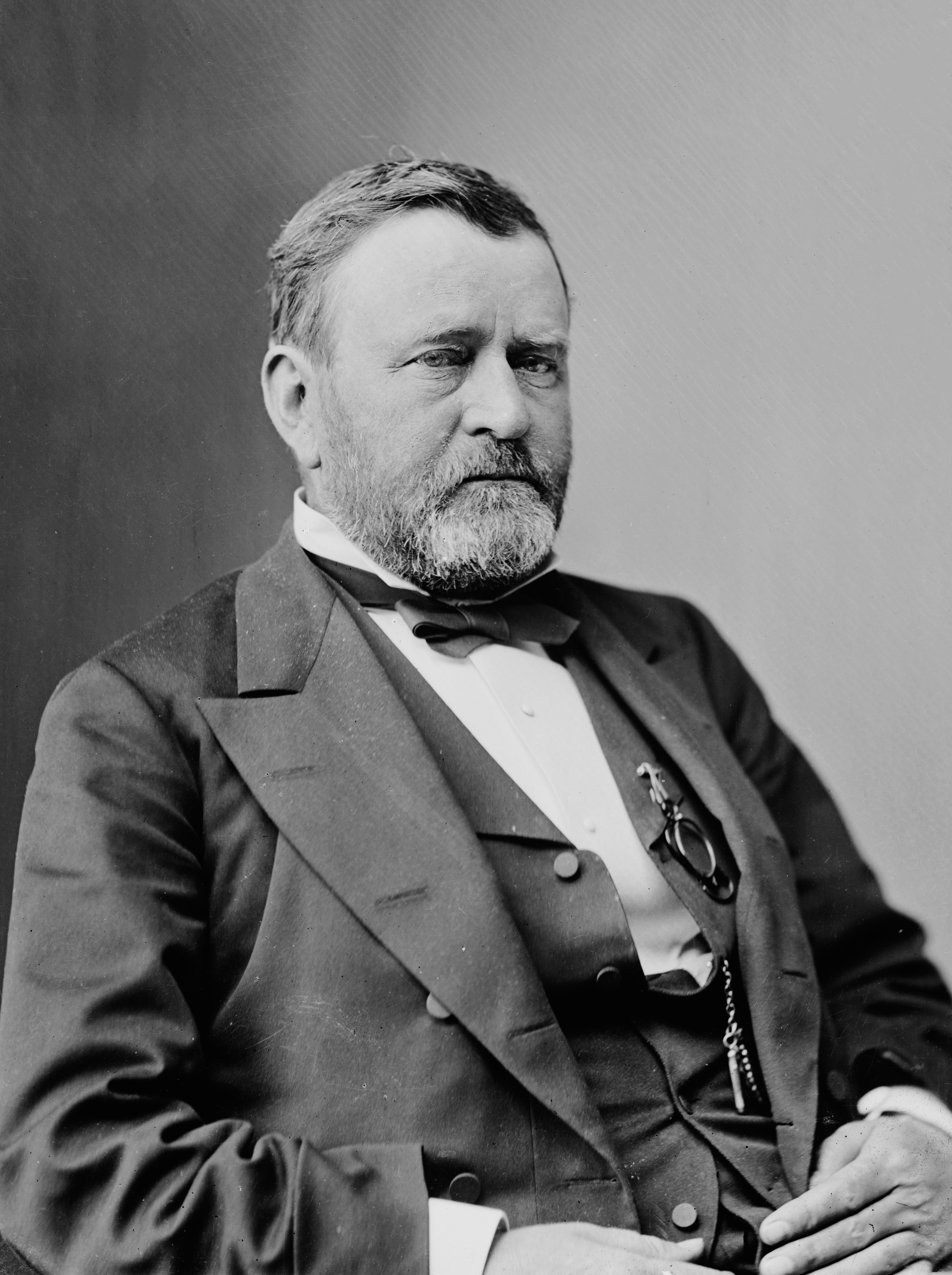
Ulysses S. Grant

- January 13 – Schuyler Colfax, 17th vice president of the United States from 1869 to 1873 (born 1823)
- January 24 – Martin Delany, African American abolitionist, journalist and physician (born 1812)
- February 12 – Alexandre Mouton, U.S. Senator from Louisiana from 1843 to 1846 (born 1804)
- March 17 – Susan Warner (pseudonym Elizabeth Weatherell), religious and children's writer (born 1819)
- May 4 – Irvin McDowell, Union Army officer known for defeat in the First Battle of Bull Run (born 1818)
- May 17 – Jonathan Young, U.S. Navy commodore (born 1826)
- May 19 – Robert Emmet Odlum, swimming instructor, dies as result of becoming the first person to jump from the Brooklyn Bridge (born 1851)
- May 20 – Frederick Theodore Frelinghuysen, 29th United States Secretary of State (born 1817)
- July 23 – Ulysses S. Grant, 18th president of the United States from 1869 to 1877 (born 1822)
- August 10 – James W. Marshall, contractor, builder of Sutter's Mill (born 1810)
- September 3 – William M. Gwin, U.S. Senator from California from 1850 to 1855 and from 1857 to 1861 (born 1805)
- October 5 – Thomas C. Durant, railroad financier (born 1820)
- October 29 – George B. McClellan, soldier, civil engineer, railroad executive and politician (born 1826)
- November 25 – Thomas A. Hendricks, 21st vice president of the United States from March to November 1885 (born 1819)
- December 8 – William Henry Vanderbilt, entrepreneur (born 1821)
- December 13 – Benjamin Gratz Brown, politician (born 1826)
- December 15 – Robert Toombs, U.S. Senator from Georgia from 1853 to 1861 (born 1810)
- December 29 – James E. Bailey, U.S. Senator from Tennessee from 1877 to 1881 (born 1821)

== See also ==
- Timeline of United States history (1860–1899)
