= Ambrose Burnside =

American general and politician (1824–1881)

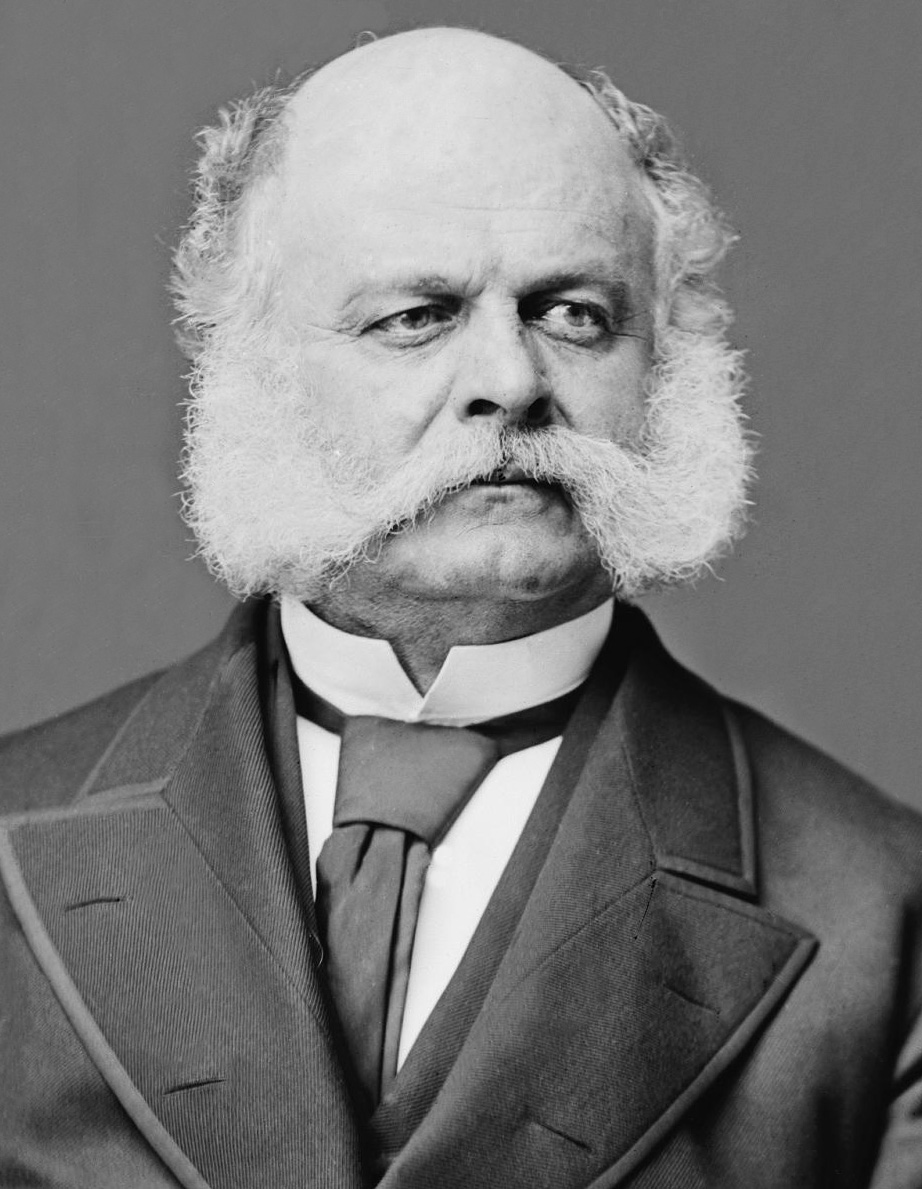
- Burnside c. 1880

United States Senator from Rhode Island
- In office March 4, 1875 – September 13, 1881
- Preceded by: William Sprague IV
- Succeeded by: Nelson W. Aldrich
Committee chairmanships
Chair of the Senate Foreign Relations Committee
In office March 4, 1881 – May 20, 1881
Preceded by	William W. Eaton
Succeeded by	George F. Edmunds
Chair of the Senate Education Committee
In office March 4, 1877 – March 3, 1879
Preceded by	John J. Patterson
Succeeded by	James E. Bailey

30th Governor of Rhode Island
- In office May 29, 1866 – May 25, 1869
- Lieutenant: William Greene; Pardon Stevens
- Preceded by: James Y. Smith
- Succeeded by: Seth Padelford

President of the National Rifle Association
- In office 1871–1872
- Preceded by: Office established
- Succeeded by: William Conant Church

Personal details
- Born: Ambrose Everts Burnside; May 23, 1824 Liberty, Indiana, U.S.
- Died: September 13, 1881 (aged 57) Bristol, Rhode Island, U.S.
- Resting place: Swan Point Cemetery; Providence, Rhode Island
- Party: Democratic (1858–1865); Republican (1866–1881)
- Spouse: Mary Richmond Bishop (m. 1852; died 1876)
- Education: United States Military Academy
- Profession: Soldier, politician, inventor, industrialist
- Nickname: Burnside

Military service
- Allegiance: United States (Union)
- Branch/service: United States Army; Union Army
- Years of service: 1847–1865
- Rank: Major general
- Commands: Army of the Potomac; Army of the Ohio
- Battles/wars: Mexican–American War; American Civil War; First Battle of Bull Run; Burnside's North Carolina Expedition; Battle of Roanoke Island; Battle of New Bern; Maryland Campaign; Battle of South Mountain; Battle of Antietam; Battle of Fredericksburg; Morgan's Raid; Knoxville Campaign; Overland Campaign; Battle of the Wilderness; Battle of Spotsylvania Court House; Battle of North Anna; Battle of Cold Harbor; Siege of Petersburg; Battle of the Crater

Ambrose Everts Burnside (May 23, 1824 – September 13, 1881) was an American army officer and politician who became a senior Union general in the American Civil War and a three-time governor of Rhode Island, as well as being an inventor and industrialist.

He achieved some of the earliest victories in the Eastern theater of the Civil War, but was then promoted above his abilities, and is mainly remembered for two disastrous defeats, at Fredericksburg (December 1862) and the Battle of the Crater (July 1864, during the Siege of Petersburg). Although an inquiry cleared him of blame in the latter case, he never regained credibility as an army commander.

Burnside was a modest and unassuming individual, mindful of his limitations, who had been propelled to high command against his will. He could be described as a genuinely unlucky man, both in battle and in commerce (due to various circumstances, most of them beyond his control, he was unable to profit from the successful cavalry firearm that had been his own invention). His style of thick facial hair became known as "sideburns", deriving from the two syllables of his surname.

== Early life ==
Burnside was born in Liberty, Indiana, and was the fourth of nine children of Edghill and Pamela (or Pamilia) Brown Burnside, a family of Scottish, Scotch-Irish and English origins. His great-great-grandfather Robert Burnside (1725–1775) was born in Scotland and settled in the Province of South Carolina. His father was a native of South Carolina; he was a slave owner who freed his slaves when he relocated to Indiana. Ambrose attended Liberty Seminary as a young boy, but his education was interrupted when his mother died in 1841; he was apprenticed to a local tailor, eventually becoming a partner in the business.

As a young officer before the Civil War, Burnside was engaged to Charlotte "Lottie" Moon, who left him at the altar. When the minister asked if she took him as her husband, Moon is said to have shouted "No siree Bob!" before running out of the church. Moon is best known for her espionage for the Confederacy during the Civil War. Later, Burnside arrested Moon, her younger sister Virginia "Ginnie" Moon, and their mother. He kept them under house arrest for months but never charged them with espionage.

== Early military career ==
He obtained an appointment to the United States Military Academy in 1843 through his father's political connections and his own interest in military affairs. During his early tenure at the academy, a clerical error was made listing his middle name as Everett, rather than Everts. According to fellow cadet Henry Heth, Burnside was a hellion who went on frequent drinking sprees by imbibing at Benny Havens. In June 1844, Burnside helped fellow cadet Richard W. Jones viciously beat George H. Derby, who would later become a famous humorist, leaving him hospitalized. Both Jones and Burnside faced a court martial in September. While Jones was expelled, Burnside was confined to light prison for one week.

Burnside graduated in 1847, ranking 18th in a class of 47, and was commissioned a brevet second lieutenant in the 2nd U.S. Artillery. He traveled to Veracruz for the Mexican–American War, but he arrived after hostilities had ceased and performed mostly garrison duty around Mexico City.

At the close of the war, Lt. Burnside served two years on the western frontier under Captain Braxton Bragg in the 3rd U.S. Artillery, a light artillery unit that had been converted to cavalry duty, protecting the Western mail routes through Nevada to California. In August 1849, he was wounded by an arrow in his neck during a skirmish against Apaches in Las Vegas, New Mexico. He was promoted to 1st lieutenant on December 12, 1851.

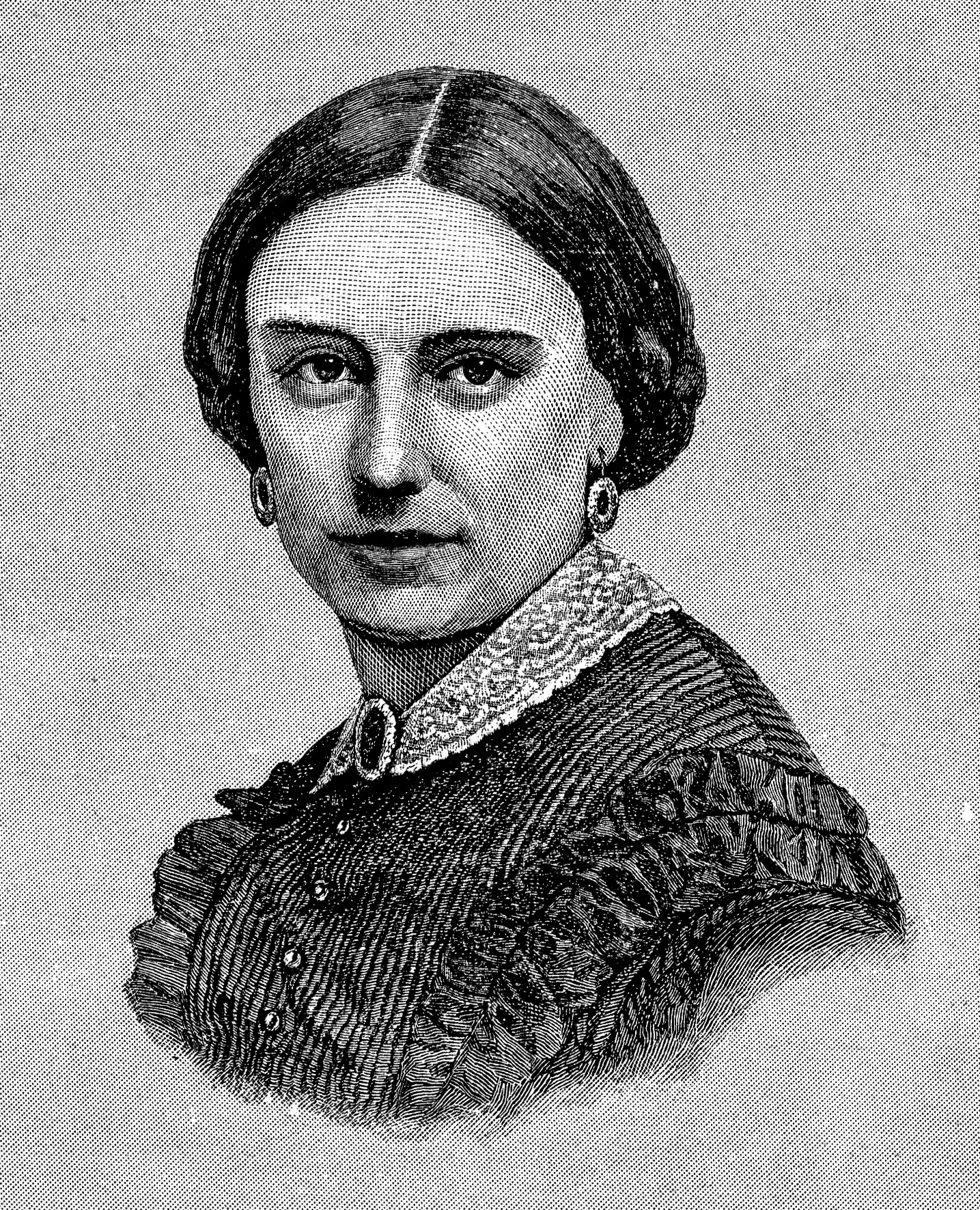
Mrs. Burnside, Mary Richmond Bishop

In 1852, he was assigned to Fort Adams, Newport, Rhode Island, and he married Mary Richmond Bishop of Providence, Rhode Island, on April 27 of that year. The marriage lasted until Mary's death in 1876, but was childless.

In October 1853, Burnside resigned his commission in the United States Army and was appointed commander of the Rhode Island state militia with the rank of major general. He held this position for two years.

After leaving the Regular Army, Burnside devoted his time and energy to the manufacture of a firearm that bears his name: the Burnside carbine. President Buchanan's Secretary of War John B. Floyd contracted the Burnside Arms Company to equip a large portion of the Army with his carbine, mostly cavalry and induced him to establish extensive factories for its manufacture. The Bristol Rifle Works were no sooner complete than another gunmaker allegedly bribed Floyd to break his $100,000 contract with Burnside.

Burnside ran as a Democrat for one of the Congressional seats in Rhode Island in 1858 and was defeated in a landslide. The burdens of the campaign and the destruction by fire of his factory contributed to his financial ruin, and he was forced to assign his firearm patents to others. He then went west in search of employment and became treasurer of the Illinois Central Railroad, where he worked for and became friendly with George B. McClellan, who later became one of his commanding officers. Burnside became familiar with corporate attorney Abraham Lincoln, future president of the United States, during this time period.

== Civil War ==
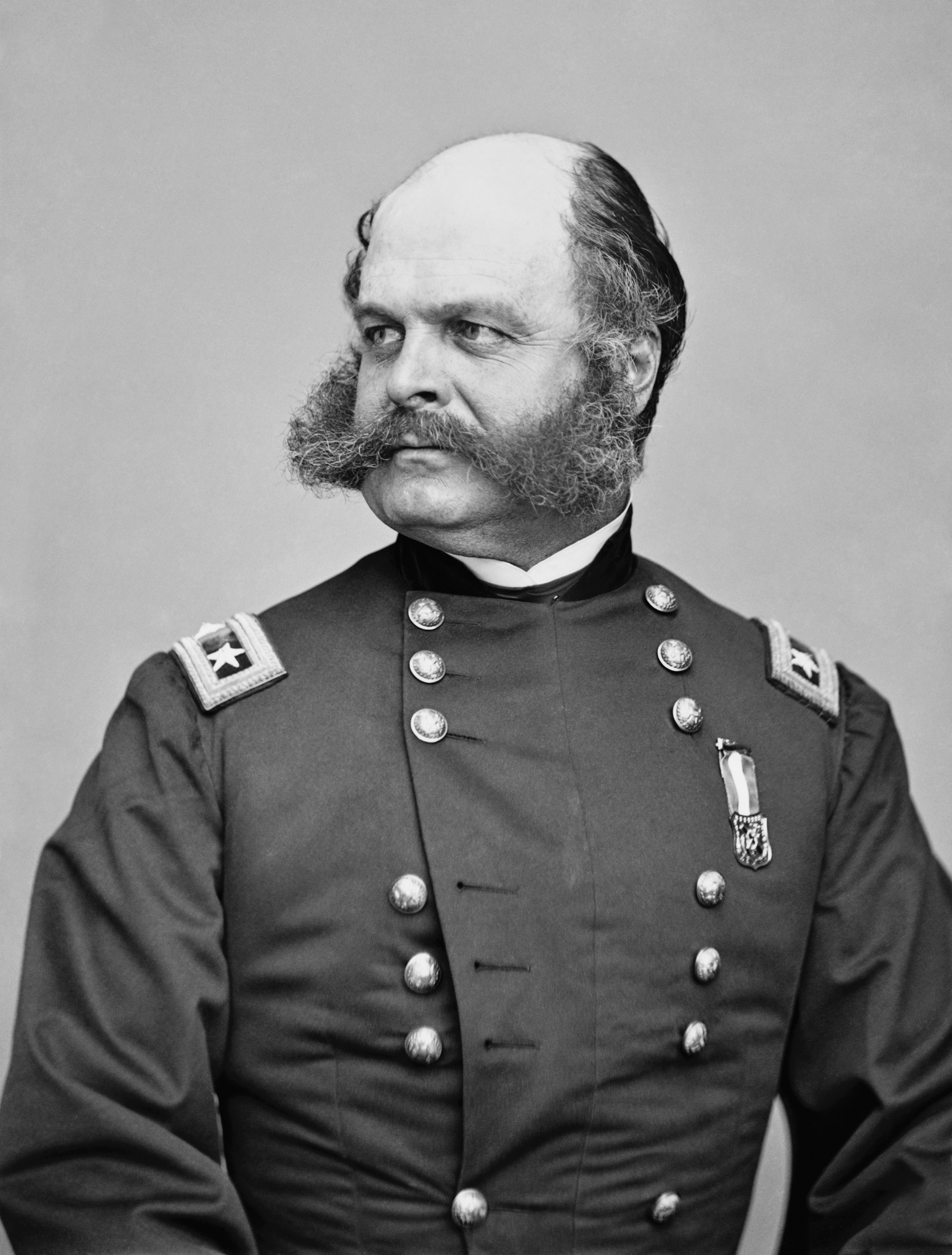
General Ambrose Burnside

=== First Bull Run ===
At the outbreak of the Civil War, Burnside was a colonel in the Rhode Island Militia. He raised the 1st Rhode Island Volunteer Infantry Regiment, and was appointed its colonel on May 2, 1861. Two companies of this regiment were then armed with Burnside carbines.

Within a month, he ascended to brigade command in the Department of northeast Virginia. He commanded the brigade without distinction at the First Battle of Bull Run in July and took over division command temporarily for wounded Brig. Gen. David Hunter. His 90-day regiment was mustered out of service on August 2; he was promoted to brigadier-general of volunteers on August 6 and was assigned to train provisional brigades in the Army of the Potomac.

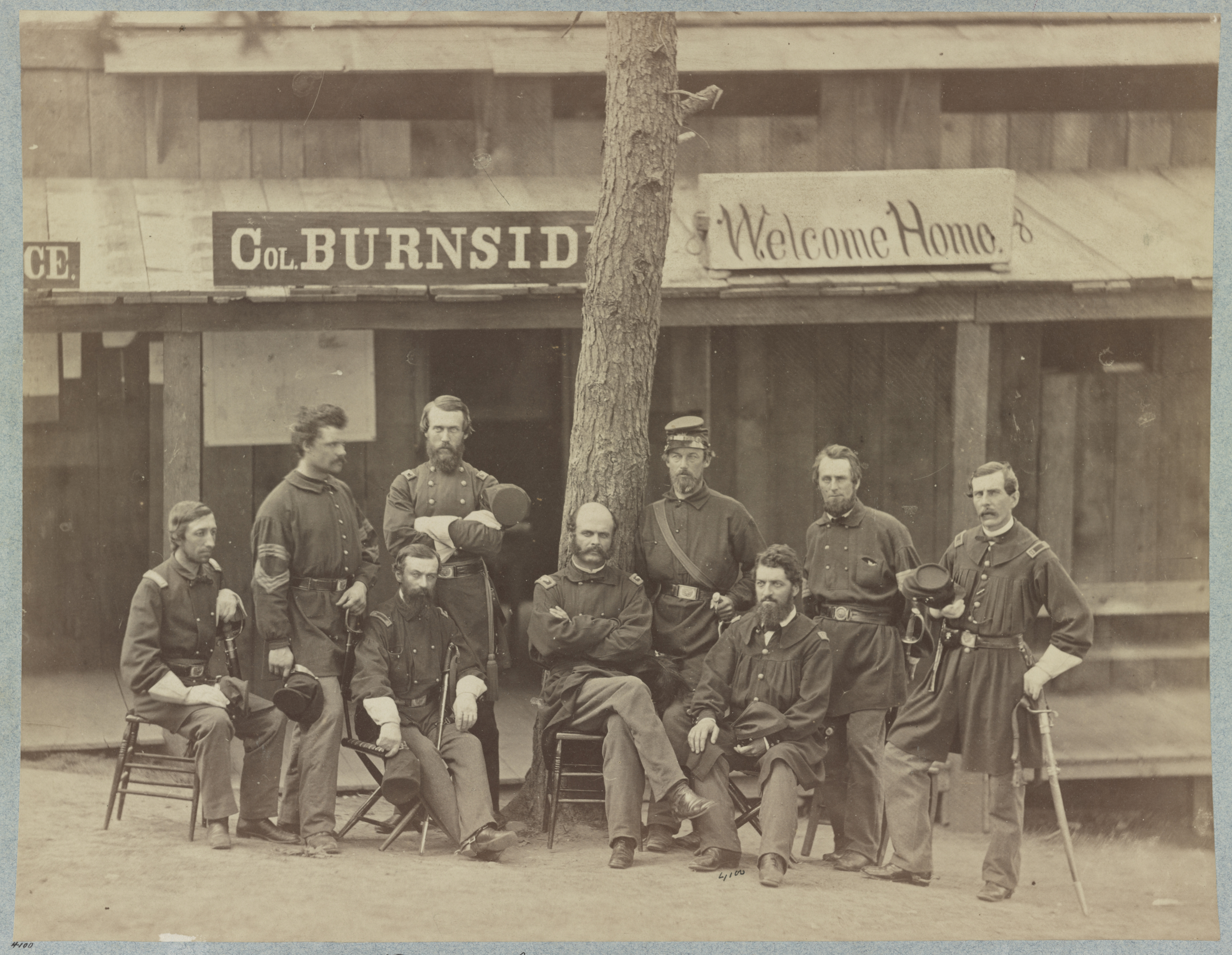
Burnside (seated, center) and officers of the 1st Rhode Island at Camp Sprague, Rhode Island, 1861

=== North Carolina ===
Burnside commanded the Coast Division or North Carolina Expeditionary Force from September 1861 until July 1862, three brigades assembled in Annapolis, Maryland, which formed the nucleus for his future IX Corps. He conducted a successful amphibious campaign that closed more than 80% of the North Carolina sea coast to Confederate shipping for the remainder of the war. This included the Battle of Elizabeth City, fought on February 10, 1862, on the Pasquotank River near Elizabeth City, North Carolina.

The participants were vessels of the United States Navy's North Atlantic Blockading Squadron opposed by vessels of the Confederate Navy's Mosquito Fleet; the latter were supported by a shore-based battery of four guns at Cobb's Point (now called Cobb Point) near the southeastern border of the town. The battle was a part of the campaign in North Carolina that was led by Burnside and known as the Burnside Expedition. The result was a Union victory, with Elizabeth City and its nearby waters in their possession and the Confederate fleet captured, sunk, or dispersed.

Burnside was promoted to major general of volunteers on March 18, 1862, in recognition of his successes at the battles of Roanoke Island and New Bern, the first significant Union victories in the Eastern Theater. During his campaign in New Bern, Burnside was initially concerned about being swamped by the number of freed slaves in the area looking for safety near the union troops, but eventually found use of the newly freedmen by putting them to work creating fortifications in return for food. He was not wrong in his first assessment, by June there were 75,000 freedmen in the New Bern area. In July, his forces were transported north to Newport News, Virginia, and became the IX Corps of the Army of the Potomac.

Burnside was offered command of the Army of the Potomac following Maj. Gen. George B. McClellan's failure in the Peninsula Campaign. He refused this opportunity because of his loyalty to McClellan and the fact that he understood his own lack of military experience, and detached part of his corps in support of Maj. Gen. John Pope's Army of Virginia in the Northern Virginia Campaign. He received telegrams at this time from Maj. Gen. Fitz John Porter which were extremely critical of Pope's abilities as a commander, and he forwarded on to his superiors in concurrence. This episode later played a significant role in Porter's court-martial, in which Burnside appeared as a witness.

Burnside again declined command following Pope's debacle at Second Bull Run.

=== Antietam ===
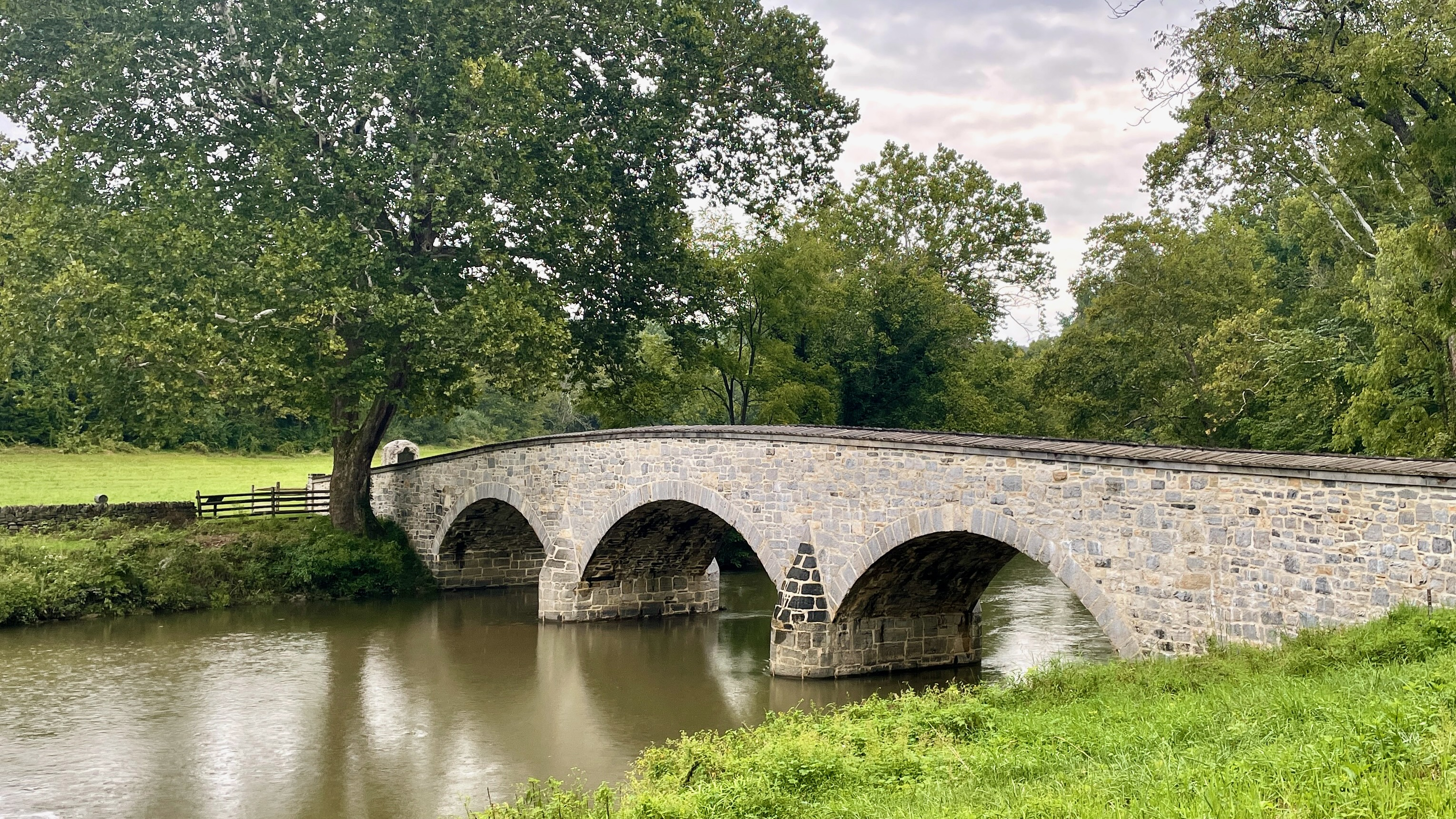
Burnside's Bridge at Antietam in 2023

Burnside was given command of the Right Wing of the Army of the Potomac (the I Corps and his own IX Corps) at the start of the Maryland Campaign for the Battle of South Mountain, but McClellan separated the two corps at the Battle of Antietam, placing them on opposite ends of the Union battle line and returning Burnside to command of just the IX Corps. Burnside implicitly refused to give up his authority and acted as though the corps commander was first Maj. Gen. Jesse L. Reno (killed at South Mountain) and then Brig. Gen. Jacob D. Cox, funneling orders through them to the corps. This cumbersome arrangement contributed to his slowness in attacking and crossing what is now called Burnside's Bridge on the southern flank of the Union line.

Burnside did not perform an adequate reconnaissance of the area, and he did not take advantage of several easy fording sites out of range of the enemy; his troops were forced into repeated assaults across the narrow bridge, which was dominated by Confederate sharpshooters on the high ground. By noon, McClellan was losing patience. He sent a succession of couriers to motivate Burnside to move forward, ordering one aide, "Tell him if it costs 10,000 men he must go now." He further increased the pressure by sending his inspector general to confront Burnside, who reacted indignantly: "McClellan appears to think I am not trying my best to carry this bridge; you are the third or fourth one who has been to me this morning with similar orders." The IX Corps eventually broke through, but the delay allowed Maj. Gen. A. P. Hill's Confederate division to come up from Harpers Ferry and repulse the Union breakthrough. McClellan refused Burnside's requests for reinforcements, and the battle ended in a tactical stalemate.

=== Fredericksburg ===
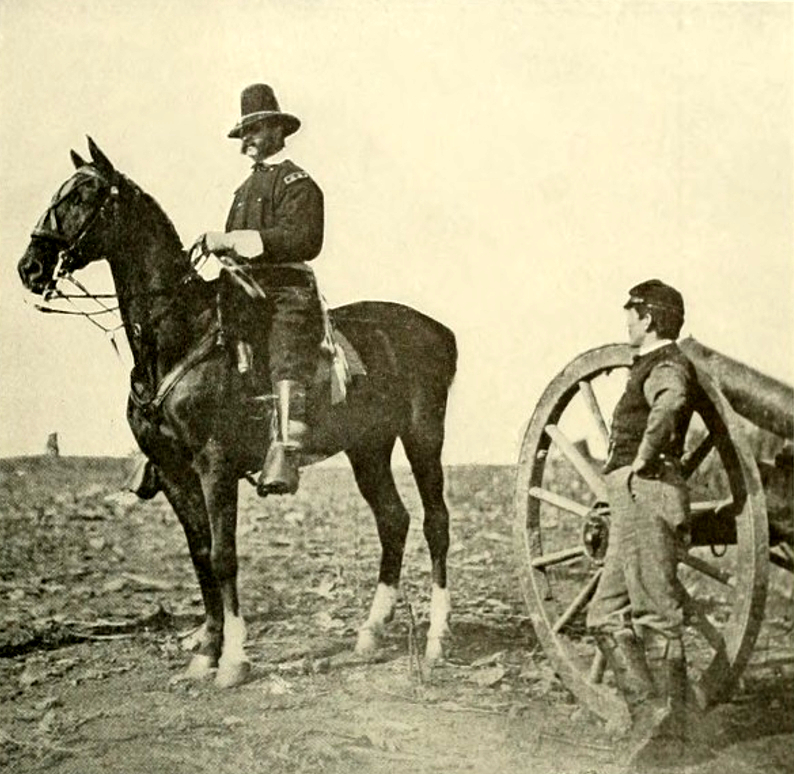
Union General Ambrose Burnside, 1862

After McClellan failed to pursue General Robert E. Lee's retreat from Antietam, Lincoln ordered McClellan's removal on November 5, 1862, and selected Burnside to replace him on November 7, 1862. Burnside reluctantly obeyed this order, the third such in his brief career, in part because the courier told him that, if he refused it, the command would go instead to Maj. Gen. Joseph Hooker, whom Burnside disliked. Burnside assumed charge of the Army of the Potomac in a change of command ceremony at the farm of Julia Claggett in New Baltimore, Virginia. McClellan visited troops to bid them farewell. Columbia Claggett, Julia Claggett's daughter-in-law, testified after the war that a "parade and transfer of the Army to Gen. Burnside took place on our farm in front of our house in a change of command ceremony at New Baltimore, Virginia, on November 9, 1862."

President Abraham Lincoln pressured Burnside to take aggressive action and approved his plan on November 14 to capture the Confederate capital at Richmond, Virginia. This plan led to a humiliating and costly Union defeat at the Battle of Fredericksburg on December 13. His advance upon Fredericksburg was rapid, but the attack was delayed when the engineers were slow to marshal pontoon bridges for crossing the Rappahannock River, as well as his own reluctance to deploy portions of his army across fording points. This allowed Gen. Lee to concentrate along Marye's Heights just west of town and easily repulse the Union attacks.

Assaults south of town were also mismanaged, which were supposed to be the main avenue of attack, and initial Union breakthroughs went unsupported. Burnside was upset by the failure of his plan and by the enormous casualties of his repeated, futile frontal assaults, and declared that he would personally lead an assault by the IX corps. His corps commanders talked him out of it, but relations were strained between the general and his subordinates. Accepting full blame, he offered to retire from the U.S. Army, but this was refused. Burnside's detractors labeled him the "Butcher of Fredericksburg".

In January 1863, Burnside launched a second offensive against Lee, but it bogged down in winter rains before anything was accomplished, and has derisively been called the Mud March. In its wake, he asked that several openly insubordinate officers be relieved of duty and court-martialed; he also offered to resign. Lincoln quickly accepted the latter option, and on January 26 replaced Burnside with Maj. Gen. Joseph Hooker, one of the officers who had conspired against him.

=== East Tennessee ===
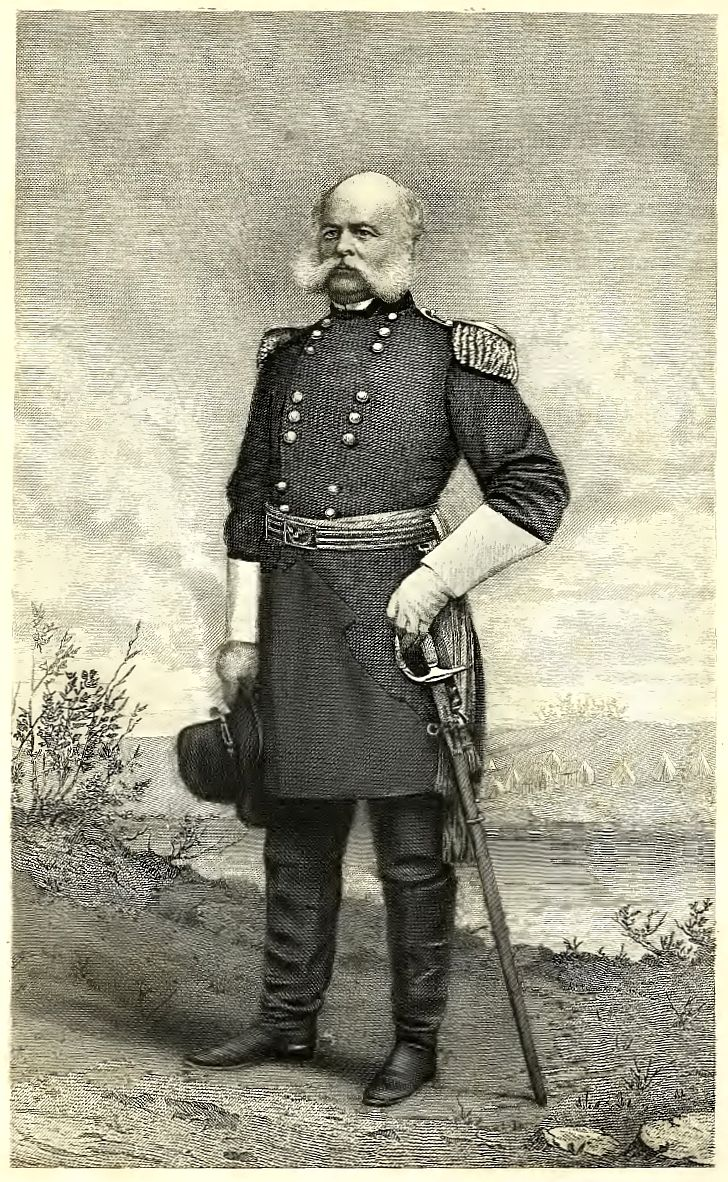
Engraving of General Burnside in full dress uniform

Burnside offered to resign his commission altogether but Lincoln declined, stating that there could still be a place for him in the army. Thus, he was placed back at the head of the IX Corps and sent to command the Department of the Ohio, encompassing the states of Ohio, Indiana, Kentucky, and Illinois. This was a quiet area with relative inactivity, and the President reasoned that Burnside could not get himself into too much trouble there. However, antiwar sentiment was riding high in the Western states as they had traditionally carried on a great deal of commerce with the South, and there was little in the way of abolitionist sentiment there or a desire to fight for the purpose of ending slavery. Burnside was thoroughly disturbed by this trend and issued a series of orders forbidding "the expression of public sentiments against the war or the Administration" in his department; this finally climaxed with General Order No. 38, which declared that "any person found guilty of treason will be tried by a military tribunal and either imprisoned or banished to enemy lines".

On May 1, 1863, Ohio Congressman Clement L. Vallandigham, a prominent opponent of the war, held a large public rally in Mount Vernon, Ohio in which he denounced President Lincoln as a "tyrant" who sought to abolish the Constitution and set up a dictatorship. Burnside had dispatched several agents to the rally who took down notes and brought back their "evidence" to the general, who then declared that it was sufficient grounds to arrest Vallandigham for treason. A military court tried him and found him guilty of violating General Order No. 38, despite his protests that he was expressing his opinions publicly. Vallandigham was sentenced to imprisonment for the duration of the war and was turned into a martyr by antiwar Democrats. Burnside next turned his attention to Illinois, where the Chicago Times newspaper had been printing antiwar editorials for months. The general dispatched a squadron of troops to the paper's offices and ordered them to cease printing.

Lincoln had not been asked or informed about either Vallandigham's arrest or the closure of the Chicago Times. He remembered the section of General Order No. 38 which declared that offenders would be banished to enemy lines and finally decided that it was a good idea so Vallandigham was freed from jail and sent to Confederate hands. Meanwhile, Lincoln ordered the Chicago Times to be reopened and announced that Burnside had exceeded his authority in both cases. The President then issued a warning that generals were not to arrest civilians or close down newspapers again without the White House's permission.

Burnside also dealt with Confederate raiders such as John Hunt Morgan.

In the Knoxville Campaign, Burnside advanced to Knoxville, Tennessee, first bypassing the Confederate-held Cumberland Gap and ultimately occupying Knoxville unopposed; he then sent troops back to the Cumberland Gap. Confederate commander Brig. Gen. John W. Frazer refused to surrender in the face of two Union brigades but Burnside arrived with a third, forcing the surrender of Frazer and 2,300 Confederates.

Union Maj. Gen. William S. Rosecrans was defeated at the Battle of Chickamauga, and Burnside was pursued by Lt. Gen. James Longstreet, against whose troops he had battled at Marye's Heights. Burnside skillfully outmaneuvered Longstreet at the Battle of Campbell's Station and was able to reach his entrenchments and safety in Knoxville, where he was briefly besieged until the Confederate defeat at the Battle of Fort Sanders outside the city. Tying down Longstreet's corps at Knoxville contributed to Gen. Braxton Bragg's defeat by Maj. Gen. Ulysses S. Grant at Chattanooga. Troops under Maj. Gen. William T. Sherman marched to Burnside's aid, but the siege had already been lifted; Longstreet withdrew, eventually returning to Virginia.

=== Overland Campaign ===
Burnside was ordered to take the IX Corps back to the Eastern Theater, where he built it up to a strength of over 21,000 in Annapolis, Maryland. The IX Corps fought in the Overland Campaign of May 1864 as an independent command, reporting initially to Grant; his corps was not assigned to the Army of the Potomac because Burnside outranked its commander Maj. Gen. George G. Meade, who had been a division commander under Burnside at Fredericksburg. This cumbersome arrangement was rectified on May 24 just before the Battle of North Anna, when Burnside agreed to waive his precedence of rank and was placed under Meade's direct command.

Burnside fought at the battles of Wilderness and Spotsylvania Court House, where he did not perform in a distinguished manner, attacking piecemeal and appearing reluctant to commit his troops to the costly frontal assaults that characterized these battles. After North Anna and Cold Harbor, he took his place in the siege lines at Petersburg.

=== The Crater ===
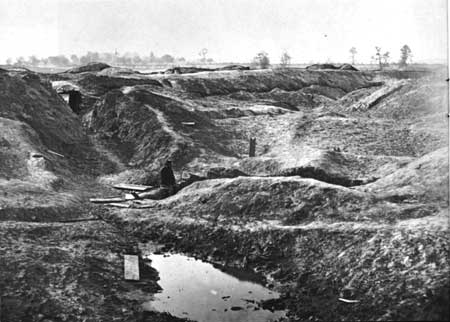
Petersburg Crater, 1865

As the two armies faced the stalemate of trench warfare at Petersburg in July 1864, Burnside agreed to a plan suggested by a regiment of former coal miners in his corps, the 48th Pennsylvania: to dig a mine under a fort named Elliot's Salient in the Confederate entrenchments and ignite explosives there to achieve a surprise breakthrough. The fort was destroyed on July 30 in what is known as the Battle of the Crater.

Because Meade had little regard for the US Colored Troops under Gen. Ferrero, Burnside was ordered, only hours before the infantry attack, not to use his division, which had been specially trained for the assault: instead, he was forced to use untrained white troops. He could not decide which division to choose as a replacement, so he had his three subordinate commanders draw lots.

The division chosen by chance was that commanded by Brig. Gen. James H. Ledlie, who had failed to brief the men on what was expected of them, and was observed to be drinking liquor with Brig. Gen Edward Ferrero in a bombproof shelter well behind the lines during the battle, providing no leadership at all.

As a result, Ledlie's men entered the huge crater instead of going around it, became trapped, and were subjected to heavy fire from Confederates around the rim, resulting in high casualties. in the end his forces suffered 3,800 casualties.

As a result of the Crater fiasco, Burnside was relieved of command on August 14 and sent on "extended leave" by Grant. He was never recalled to duty for the remainder of the war. A court of inquiry later placed the blame for the defeat on Burnside, Ledlie and Ferrero. In December, Burnside met with President Lincoln and General Grant about his future. He was contemplating resignation, but Lincoln and Grant requested that he remain in the Army. At the end of the interview, Burnside wrote, "I was not informed of any duty upon which I am to be placed." He finally resigned his commission on April 15, 1865, after Lee's surrender at Appomattox.

The United States Congress Joint Committee on the Conduct of the War later exonerated Burnside and placed the blame for the Union defeat at the Crater on General Meade for requiring the specially trained USCT (United States Colored Troops) men to be withdrawn.

== Postbellum career ==
After his resignation, Burnside was employed in numerous railroad and industrial directorships, including the presidencies of the Cincinnati and Martinsville Railroad, the Indianapolis and Vincennes Railroad, the Cairo and Vincennes Railroad, and the Rhode Island Locomotive Works.

He was elected to three one-year terms as Governor of Rhode Island, serving from May 29, 1866, to May 25, 1869. He was nominated by the Republican Party to be their candidate for governor in March 1866, and Burnside was elected governor in a landslide on April 4, 1866. This began Burnside's political career as a Republican, as he had been a Democrat before the war.

Burnside was a Companion of the Massachusetts Commandery of the Military Order of the Loyal Legion of the United States, a military society of Union officers and their descendants, and served as the Junior Vice Commander of the Massachusetts Commandery in 1869. He was commander-in-chief of the Grand Army of the Republic (GAR) veterans' association from 1871 to 1872, and also served as the Commander of the Department of Rhode Island of the GAR. At its inception in 1871, the National Rifle Association of America chose him as its first president.

During a visit to Europe in 1870, Burnside attempted to mediate between the French and the Germans in the Franco-Prussian War. He was registered at the offices of Drexel, Harjes & Co., Geneva, week ending November 5, 1870. Drexel Harjes was a major lender to the new French government after the war, helping it to repay its massive war reparations.

In 1876, Burnside was elected as commander of the New England Battalion of the Centennial Legion, the title of a collection of 13 militia units from the original 13 states, which participated in the parade in Philadelphia on July 4, 1876, to mark the centennial of the signing of the Declaration of Independence.

In 1874, Burnside was elected by the Rhode Island Senate as a U.S. Senator from Rhode Island, was re-elected in 1880, and served until his death in 1881. Burnside continued his association with the Republican Party, playing a prominent role in military affairs as well as serving as chairman of the Foreign Relations Committee in 1881.

== Death and burial ==
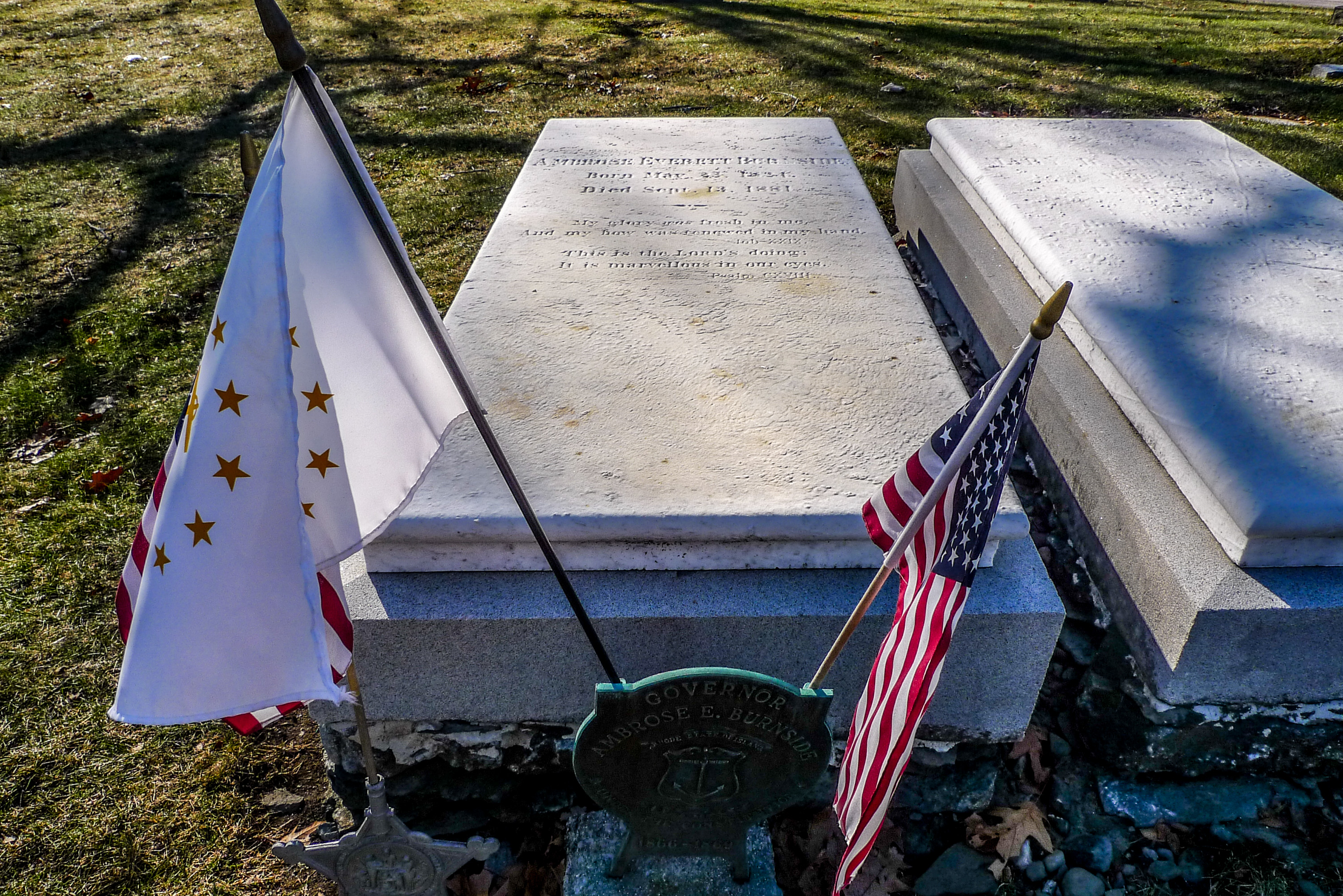
Burnside's grave at Swan Point Cemetery

Burnside died suddenly of "neuralgia of the heart" (angina pectoris) on the morning of September 13, 1881, at his home in Bristol, Rhode Island, accompanied only by his doctor and family servants.

Burnside's body lay in state at City Hall until his funeral on September 16. A procession took his casket, in a hearse drawn by four black horses, to the First Congregational Church for services which were attended by many local dignitaries. Following the services, the procession made its way to Swan Point Cemetery for burial. Businesses and mills were closed for much of the day, and "thousands" of mourners from "all towns of the state and many places in Massachusetts and Connecticut" crowded the streets of Providence for the occasion.

== Assessment and legacy ==
Personally, Burnside was always very popular, both in the army and in politics. He made friends easily, smiled a lot, and remembered everyone's name. His professional military reputation, however, was less positive, and he was known for being obstinate, unimaginative, and unsuited both intellectually and emotionally for high command. Grant stated that he was "unfitted" for the command of an army and that no one knew this better than Burnside himself. Knowing his capabilities, he twice refused command of the Army of the Potomac, accepting only the third time when the courier told him that otherwise the command would go to Joseph Hooker. Jeffry D. Wert described Burnside's relief after Fredericksburg in a passage that sums up his military career:

He had been the most unfortunate commander of the Army, a general who had been cursed by succeeding its most popular leader and a man who believed he was unfit for the post. His tenure had been marked by bitter animosity among his subordinates and a fearful, if not needless, sacrifice of life. A firm patriot, he lacked the power of personality and will to direct recalcitrant generals. He had been willing to fight the enemy, but the terrible slope before Marye's Heights stands as his legacy.

— Jeffry D. Wert, The Sword of Lincoln

Bruce Catton summarized Burnside:

... Burnside had repeatedly demonstrated that it had been a military tragedy to give him a rank higher than colonel. One reason might have been that, with all his deficiencies, Burnside never had any angles of his own to play; he was a simple, honest, loyal soldier, doing his best even if that best was not very good, never scheming or conniving or backbiting. Also, he was modest; in an army many of whose generals were insufferable prima donnas, Burnside never mistook himself for Napoleon. Physically he was impressive: tall, just a little stout, wearing what was probably the most artistic and awe-inspiring set of whiskers in all that bewhiskered Army. He customarily wore a high, bell-crowned felt hat with the brim turned down and a double-breasted, knee-length frock coat, belted at the waist—a costume which, unfortunately, is apt to strike the modern eye as being very much like that of a beefy city cop of the 1880s.

— Bruce Catton, Mr. Lincoln's Army

=== Sideburns ===
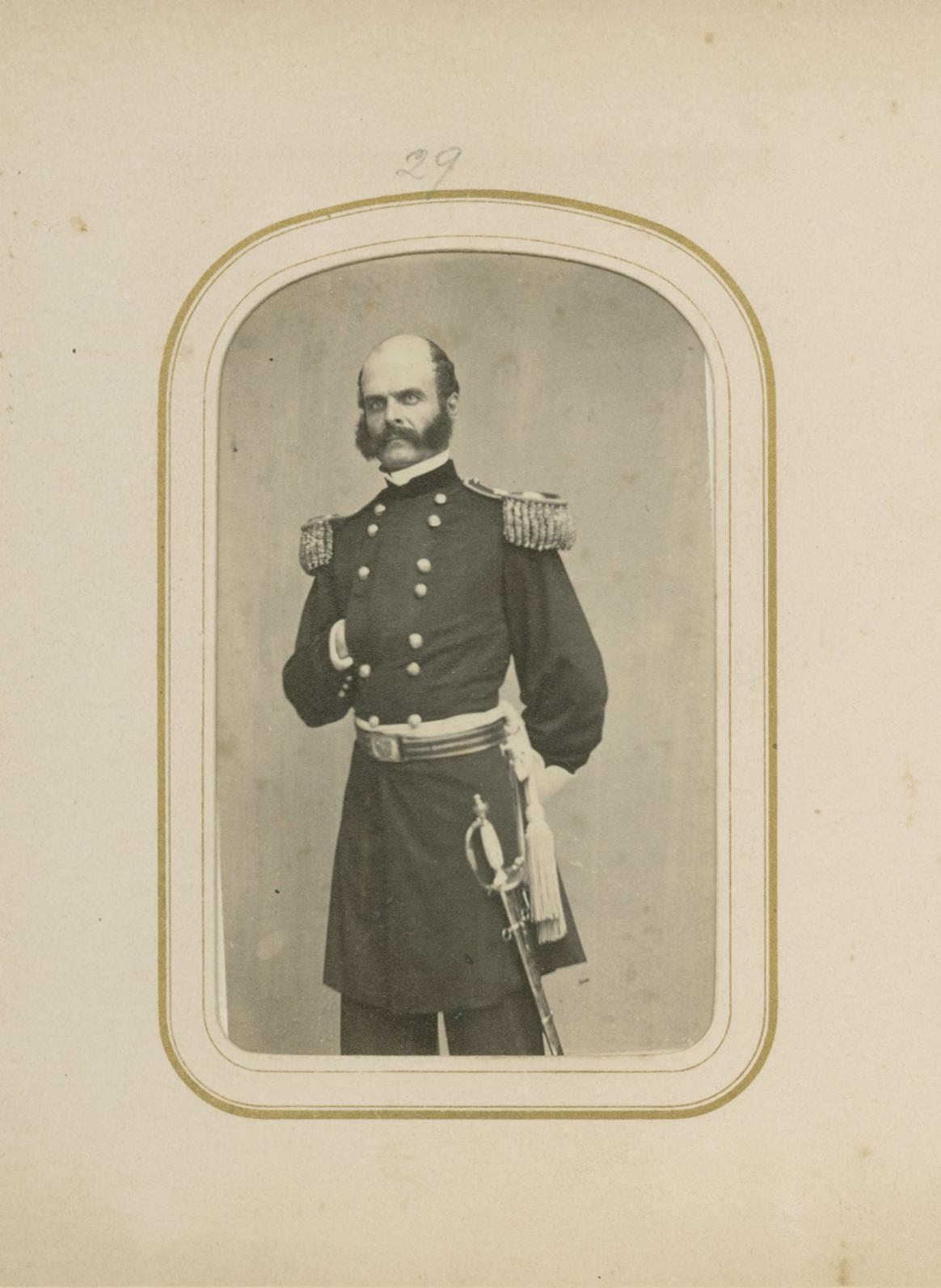
Studio photograph of Gen. Ambrose Burnside taken sometime between 1860 and 1862. Photograph shows his unusual sideburns.

Burnside was noted for his unusual beard, joining strips of hair in front of his ears to his mustache but with the chin clean-shaven; the word burnsides was coined to describe this style. The syllables were later reversed to give sideburns.

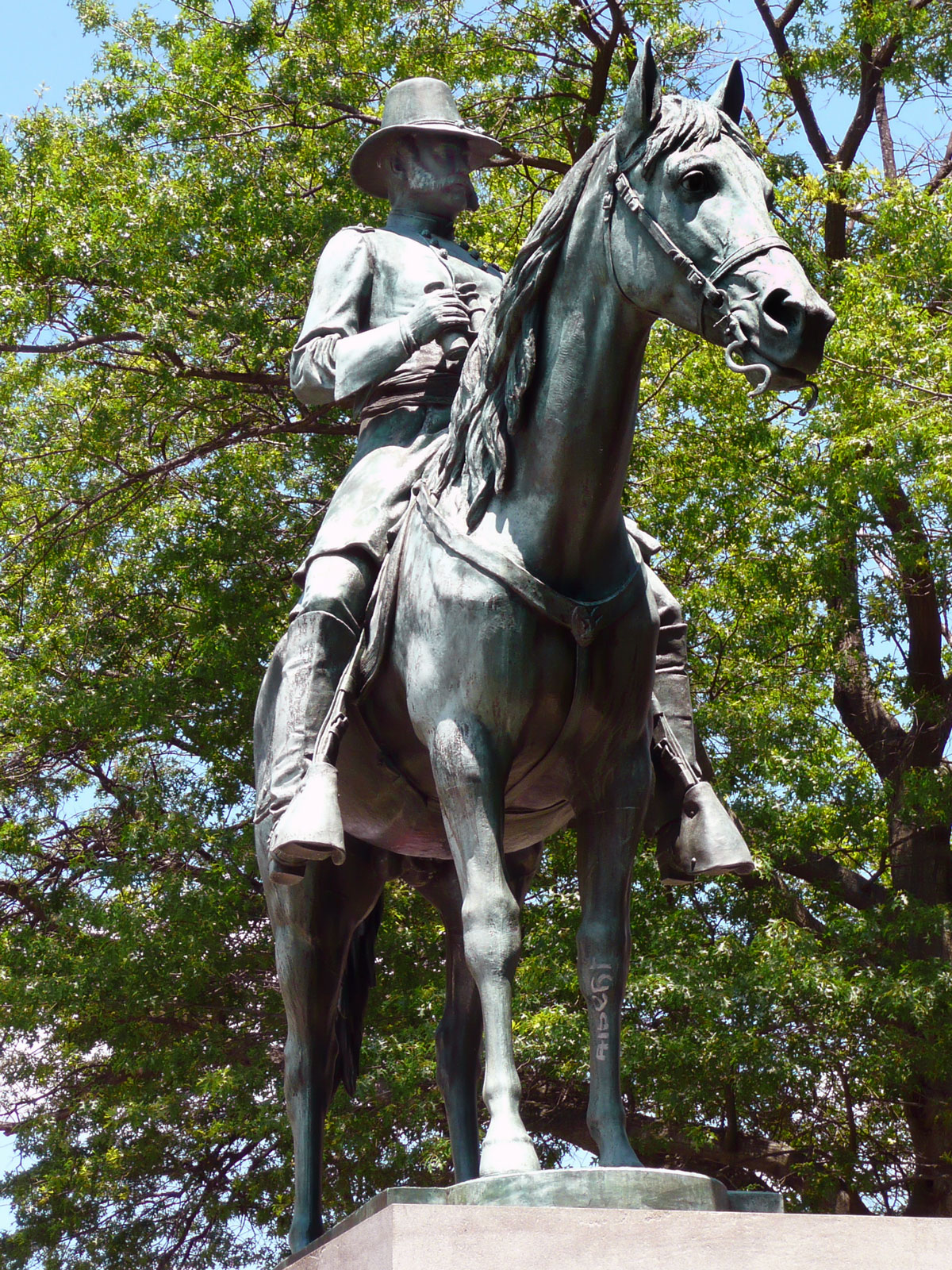
Equestrian monument in Burnside Park, Providence, Rhode Island

== Honors ==
- In 1866, Allison Township in Lapeer County, Michigan, was renamed Burnside Township to honor Ambrose Burnside.
- An equestrian statue designed by Launt Thompson, a New York sculptor, was dedicated in 1887 at Exchange Place in Providence, facing City Hall. In 1906, the statue was moved to City Hall Park, which was re-dedicated as Burnside Park.
- Bristol, Rhode Island, has a small street named for Burnside.
- The Burnside Memorial Hall in Bristol, Rhode Island, is a two-story Richardson Romanesque public building on Hope Street. It was dedicated in 1883 by President Chester A. Arthur and Governor Augustus O. Bourn. Originally, a statue of Burnside was intended to be the focus of the porch. The architect was Stephen C. Earle.
- Burnside, Kentucky, in south-central Kentucky, is a small town south of Somerset named for the former site of Camp Burnside, near the former Cumberland River town of Point Isabelle.
- New Burnside, Illinois, along the Cairo and Vincennes Railroad, was named after the former general for his role in founding the village through directorship of the new rail line.
- Burnside Residence Hall at the University of Rhode Island in Kingston was opened in 1966.
- Burnside, Wisconsin, is named for the general.

== Portrayals ==
- Burnside was portrayed by Alex Hyde-White in Ronald F. Maxwell's 2003 film Gods and Generals, which includes the Battle of Fredericksburg.

== See also ==
- List of American Civil War generals (Union)
- List of members of the United States Congress who died in office (1790–1899)

== Bibliography ==
- Bailey, Ronald H., and the Editors of Time-Life Books. The Bloodiest Day: The Battle of Antietam. Alexandria, VA: Time-Life Books, 1984. ISBN 0-8094-4740-1.
- Catton, Bruce. Mr. Lincoln's Army. Garden City, NY: Doubleday and Company, 1951. ISBN 0-385-04310-4.
- Chernow, Ron (2017). Grant. New York: Penguin Press. ISBN 978-1-59420-487-6.
- Eicher, John H., and David J. Eicher. Civil War High Commands. Stanford, CA: Stanford University Press, 2001. ISBN 0-8047-3641-3.
- Esposito, Vincent J. (1959). West Point Atlas of American Wars. Vol. 1: 1689–1900 (1st ed.). New York: Frederick A. Praeger Publishers. OCLC 5890637.
- Goolrick, William K., and the Editors of Time-Life Books. Rebels Resurgent: Fredericksburg to Chancellorsville. Alexandria, VA: Time-Life Books, 1985. ISBN 0-8094-4748-7.
- Grimsley, Mark. And Keep Moving On: The Virginia Campaign, May–June 1864. Lincoln: University of Nebraska Press, 2002. ISBN 0-8032-2162-2.
- Korn, Jerry, and the Editors of Time-Life Books. The Fight for Chattanooga: Chickamauga to Missionary Ridge. Alexandria, VA: Time-Life Books, 1985. ISBN 0-8094-4816-5.
- McPherson, James M. Battle Cry of Freedom: The Civil War Era. Oxford History of the United States. New York: Oxford University Press, 1988. ISBN 0-19-503863-0.
- Marvel, William. Burnside. Chapel Hill: University of North Carolina Press, 1991. ISBN 0-8078-1983-2.
- Mierka, Gregg A. "Rhode Island's Own." MOLLUS biography. Accessed July 19, 2010.
- Rhea, Gordon C. The Battles for Spotsylvania Court House and the Road to Yellow Tavern May 7–12, 1864. Baton Rouge: Louisiana State University Press, 1997. ISBN 0-8071-2136-3.
- Sauers, Richard A. "Ambrose Everett Burnside." In Encyclopedia of the American Civil War: A Political, Social, and Military History, edited by David S. Heidler and Jeanne T. Heidler. New York: W. W. Norton & Company, 2000. ISBN 0-393-04758-X.
- Sears, Stephen W. Landscape Turned Red: The Battle of Antietam. Boston: Houghton Mifflin, 1983. ISBN 0-89919-172-X.
- Slotkin, Richard (2009). No Quarter: The Battle of the Crater, 1864. Random House Publishing Group. ISBN 978-1-5883-6848-5.
- Wagner, Travis P. Military Honor on Trial: The Saga of Joseph Hooker and George H. Derby, Sequoia Grove Press, 2026. ISBN 979-8-9959916-2-5.
- Warner, Ezra J. (1992) [1964]. Generals in Blue: Lives of the Union Commanders. Baton Rouge: Louisiana State University Press. ISBN 978-0-8071-0822-2.
- Wert, Jeffry D. The Sword of Lincoln: The Army of the Potomac. New York: Simon & Schuster, 2005. ISBN 0-7432-2506-6.
- Wilson, James Grant, John Fiske and Stanley L. Klos, eds. "Ambrose Burnside." In Appleton's Cyclopedia of American Biography. New Work: D. Appleton & Co., 1887–1889 and 1999.

Party political offices
Preceded by James Y. Smith	Republican nominee for Governor of Rhode Island; 1866, 1867, 1868	Succeeded by Seth Padelford
Military offices
Preceded by none, new corps	Commander of the IX Corps; July 22, 1862 – August 3, 1862	Succeeded by Department of Virginia
Preceded by George B. McClellan	Commander of the Army of the Potomac; November 9, 1862 – January 26, 1863	Succeeded by Joseph Hooker
Political offices
Preceded by James Y. Smith	Governor of Rhode Island; 1866–1869	Succeeded by Seth Padelford
Preceded by John A. Logan	Commander-in-Chief of the Grand Army of the Republic; 1871–1873	Succeeded by Charles Devens
U.S. Senate
Preceded by William Sprague	U.S. senator (Class 1) from Rhode Island; 1875–1881; Served alongside: Henry B. Anthony	Succeeded by Nelson W. Aldrich
National Rifle Association of America
New title	President of the NRA; 1871–1872	Succeeded by William Conant Church
