= Virginia Moon =

Virginia Moon may refer to:

- "Virginia Moon", song on the Foo Fighters' album, In Your Honor
- Virginia Bethel Moon (1844–1926), American spy
