= 1883 Rhode Island gubernatorial election =

- April 4, 1883
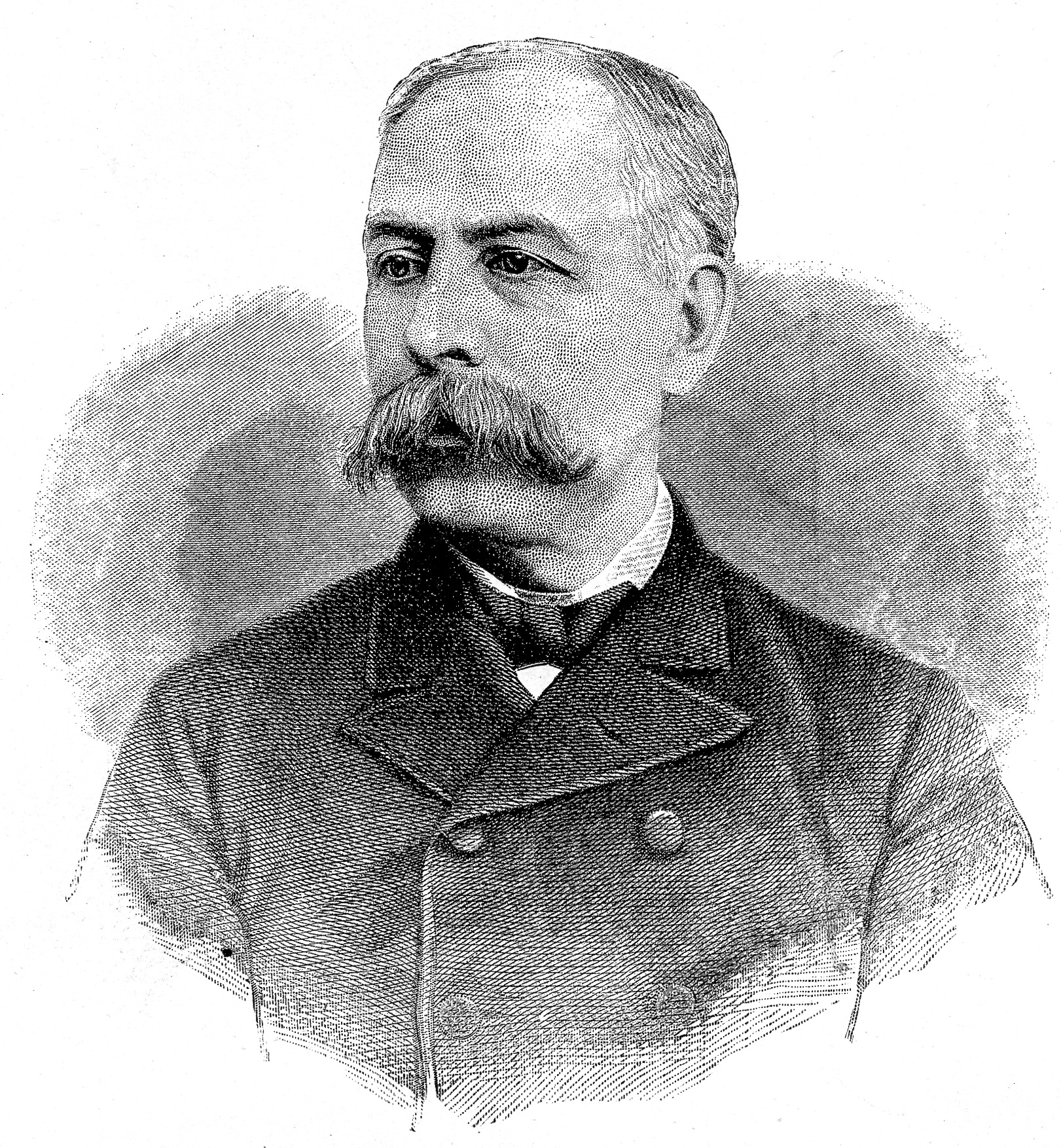

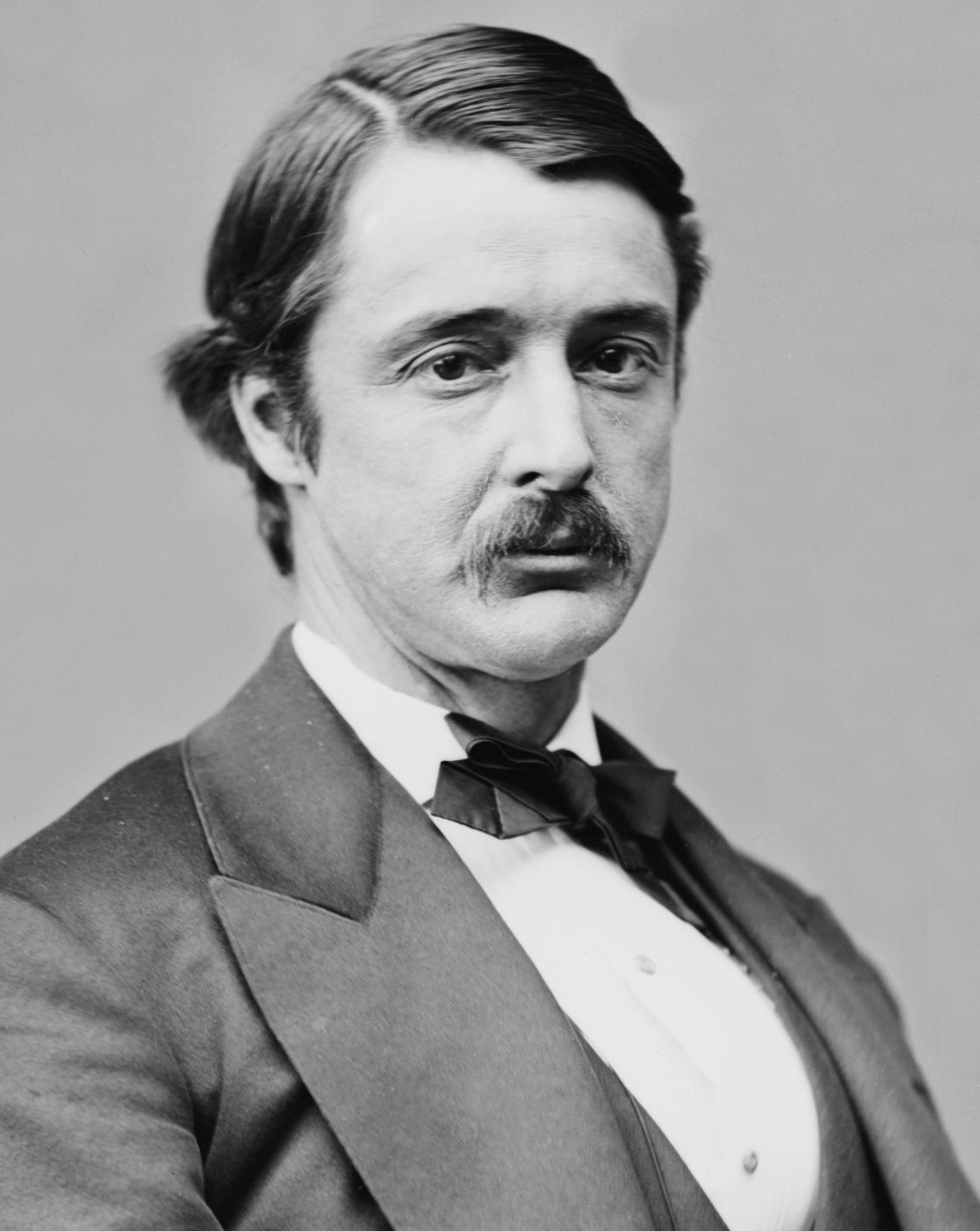
Nominee	Augustus O. Bourn	William Sprague IV
Party	Republican	Democratic
Popular vote	13,078	10,201
Percentage	54.48%	42.50%
- County results Bourn: 50–60% 60–70% 70–80%
Governor before election
Alfred H. Littlefield
Republican
Elected Governor
Augustus O. Bourn
Republican

The 1883 Rhode Island gubernatorial election was held on April 4, 1883. Republican nominee Augustus O. Bourn defeated Democratic nominee William Sprague IV with 54.48% of the vote.

== General election ==
=== Candidates ===
Major party candidates

- Augustus O. Bourn, Republican
- William Sprague IV, Democratic

Other candidates

- Charles R. Cutler, Independent

=== Results ===
1883 Rhode Island gubernatorial election
Party	Candidate	Votes	%	±%
Republican	Augustus O. Bourn	13,078	54.48%	
Democratic	William Sprague IV	10,201	42.50%	
Independent	Charles R. Cutler	706	2.94%	
Majority		2,877		
Turnout				
Republican hold		Swing		
