= Lucius B. Darling =

American politician

Lucius Bowles Darling
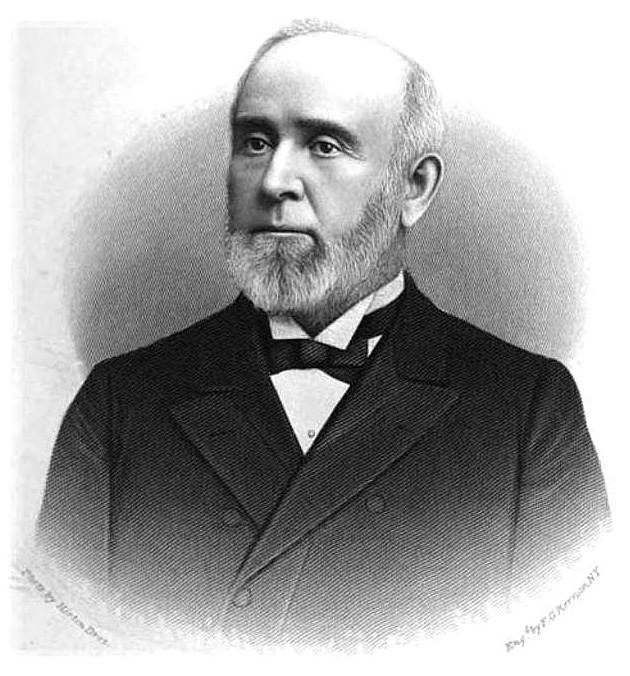

Lieutenant governor of Rhode Island
- In office May 26, 1885 – May 29, 1887
- Governor: George P. Wetmore
- Preceded by: Oscar Rathbun
- Succeeded by: Samuel R. Honey

Personal details
- Born: October 3, 1827 Bellingham, Massachusetts
- Died: January 3, 1896 (aged 68) Pawtucket, Rhode Island
- Resting place: Swan Point Cemetery
- Party: Republican
- Spouse: Angeline H. Armington
- Profession: Businessman (fertilizer company); theatre owner

Lucius Bowles Darling (October 3, 1827 – January 3, 1896) was a Rhode Island businessman who ran a slaughterhouse and fertilizer company. He was Lieutenant governor of Rhode Island for two one-year terms, 1885–1887.

== Personal life ==
Darling was born in Bellingham, Massachusetts to Samuel and Margaret (Smith) Darling. He grew up on their farm and attended public schools. At age 22, he left the farm and moved to Providence, eventually settling in Pawtucket, which was then part of North Providence.

He was married to Angeline H. Armington November 4, 1847. They had six children.

== Business life ==
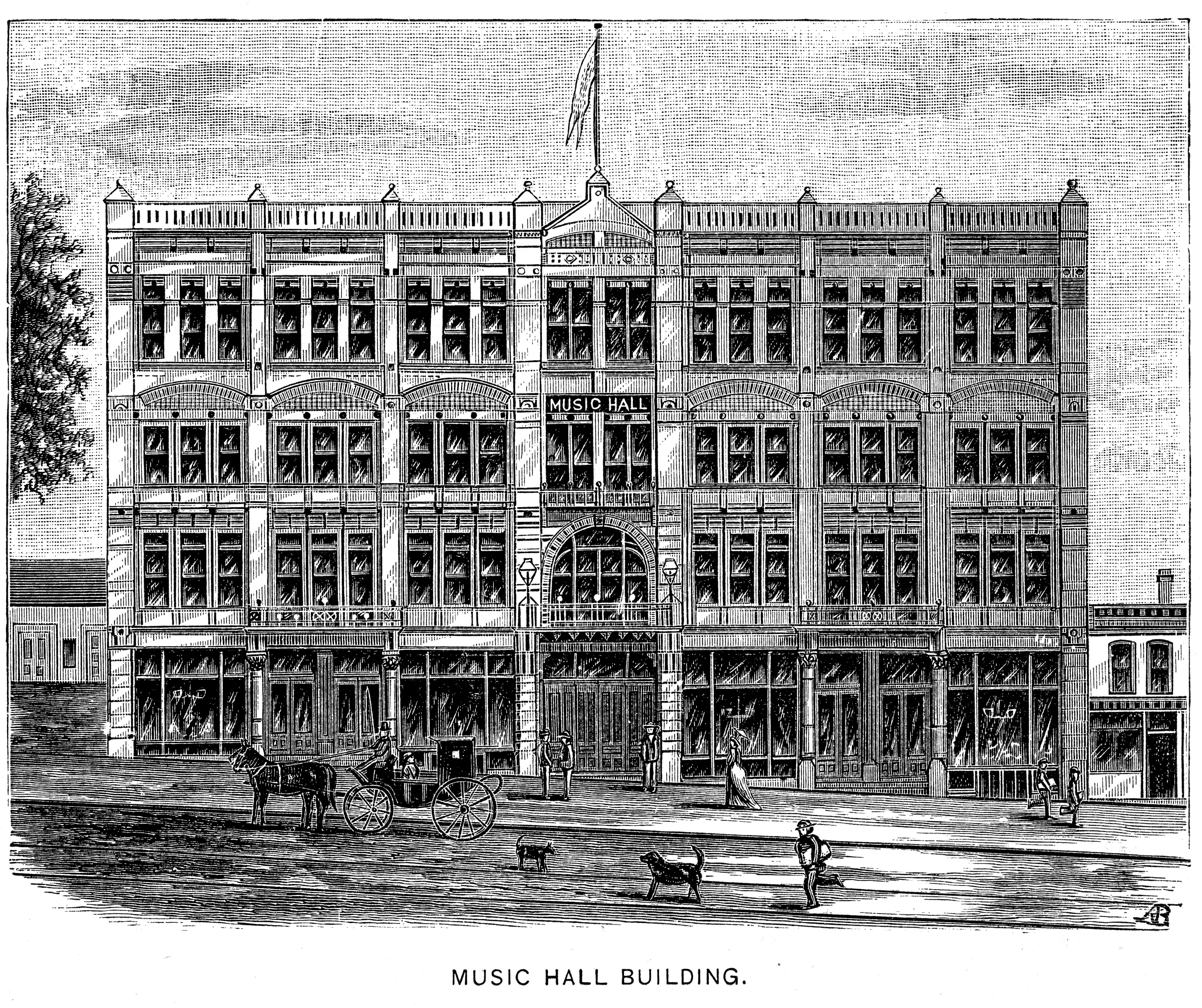
Darling's Music Hall Building

Just outside the western border of Pawtucket, in Mineral Springs, Darling established a slaughterhouse which utilized every part of the animal for meat, oil, tallow, and fertilizer. In 1881, he established a branch office in Chicago, which acquired cattle for his Rhode Island slaughterhouse. By 1884, fertilizer was his main business, under the name of the Darling Fertilizer Company.

He also served as director or president of several companies including the Pacific National Bank of Pawtucket, the Pawtucket Gas Company, and the Swan Point Cemetery Company.

Darling commissioned and was the sole owner of the Music Hall Building on Pawtucket's Main Street. The Music Hall building had a 1700-seat theater on the second floor, with three seating sections: an orchestra, balcony, and second balcony. It was considered one of the most beautiful buildings in Pawtucket. The building originally hosted opera and vaudeville performances; later it showed motion pictures. The Music Hall Building was demolished in 1970 as part of a downtown urban renewal project.

== Political life ==
Darling was appointed harbor commissioner by Governor Littlefield in 1881, and re-appointed by Governor Bourn in 1883. He served two one-year terms as Lieutenant governor.

== Death ==
Darling died in Pawtucket in 1896, and is buried at Swan Point Cemetery.

Political offices
Preceded by Oscar Rathbun	Lieutenant Governor of Rhode Island; 1885–1887	Succeeded by Samuel R. Honey
