= 1884 Rhode Island gubernatorial election =

- April 2, 1884
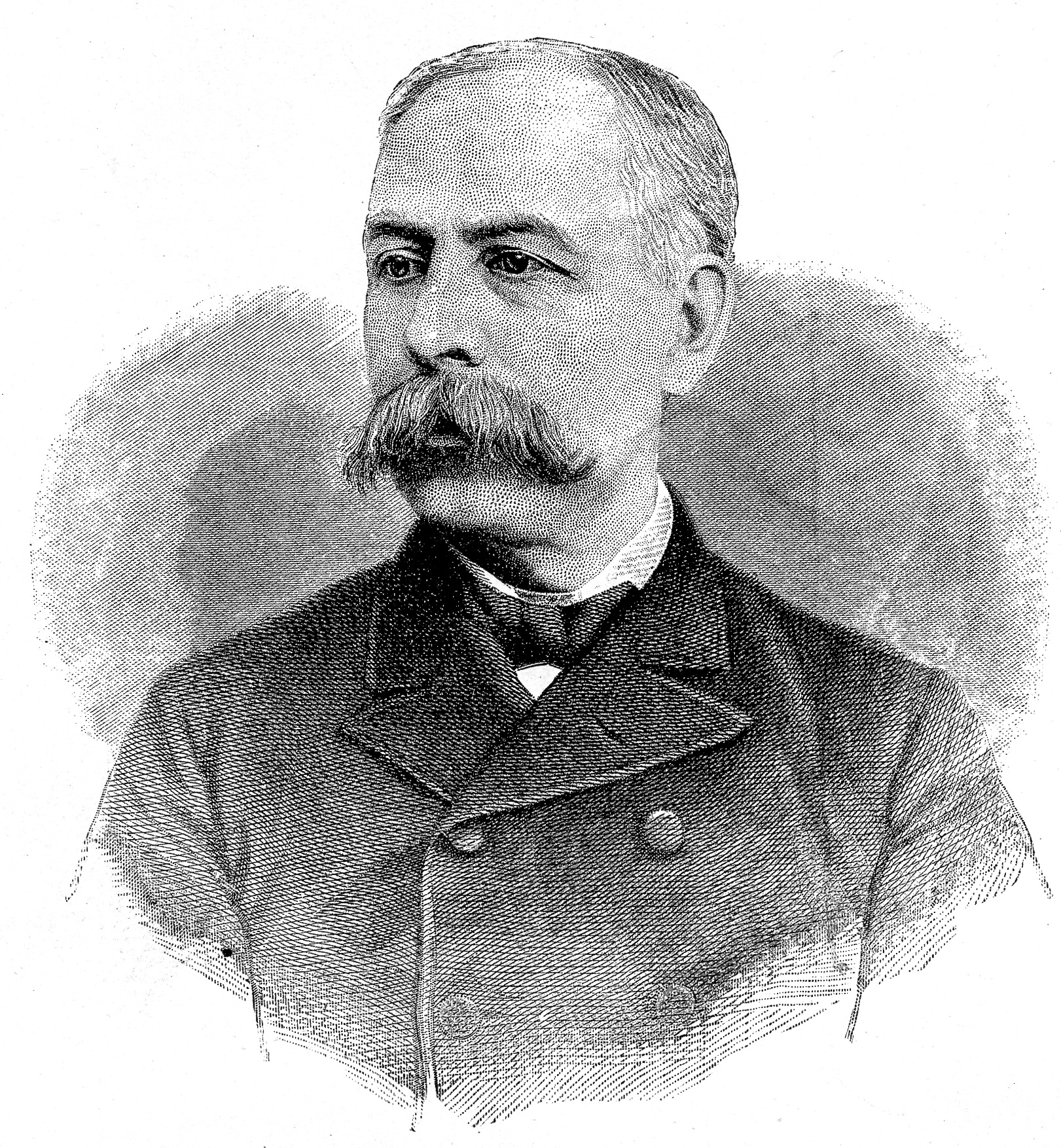

Nominee	Augustus O. Bourn	Thomas W. Segar
Party	Republican	Democratic
Popular vote	15,936	9,592
Percentage	62.39%	37.56%
- County results Bourn: 60–70% 70–80%
Governor before election
Augustus O. Bourn
Republican
Elected Governor
Augustus O. Bourn
Republican

The 1884 Rhode Island gubernatorial election was held on April 2, 1884. Incumbent Republican Augustus O. Bourn defeated Democratic nominee Thomas W. Segar with 62.39% of the vote.

== General election ==
=== Candidates ===
- Augustus O. Bourn, Republican
- Thomas W. Segar, Democratic

=== Results ===
1884 Rhode Island gubernatorial election
Party	Candidate	Votes	%	±%
Republican	Augustus O. Bourn (incumbent)	15,936	62.39%	
Democratic	Thomas W. Segar	9,592	37.56%	
Majority		6,344		
Turnout				
Republican hold		Swing		
