= Lottie Moon House =

Building in Ohio, United States

- Interactive map of the Lottie Moon House area

General information
- Architectural style: Nineteenth Century
- Location: Oxford, Ohio, United States
- Coordinates: 39°30′38.45″N 84°44′16.60″W
- Elevation: 950.174 ft (289.613 m)
- Completed: 1831
- Owner: Miami University

Dimensions
- Other dimensions: 60 Feet from Road

Technical details
- Floor count: 2

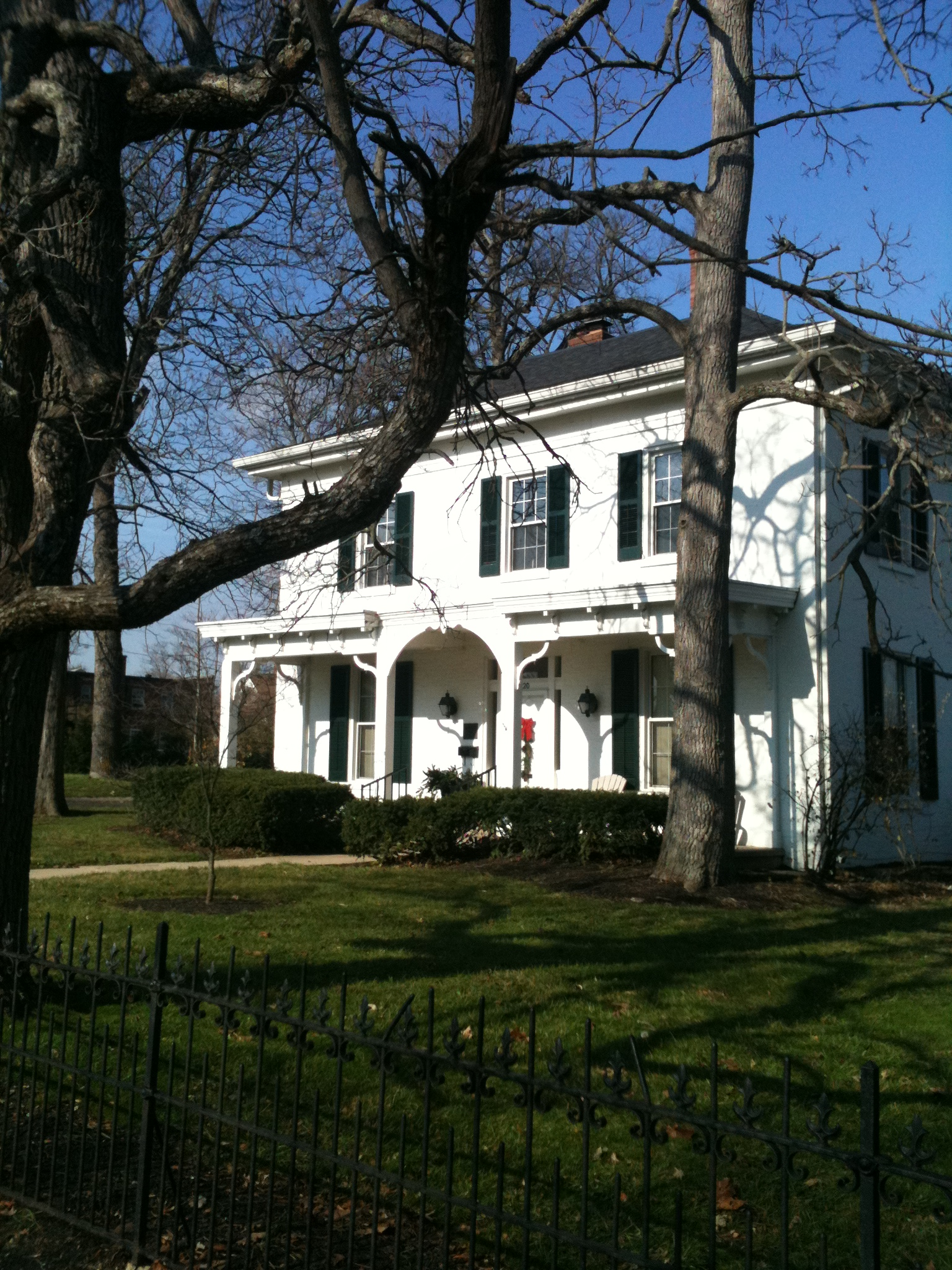
Main façade of the Lottie Moon House - 2011

The Lottie Moon House, located at 220 East High Street in Oxford, Ohio, was completed in 1831. It was not named Lottie Moon House, but rather adopted the name after being inhabited by the Moon family in 1839. The nineteenth-century architecture is a simple design enhanced by a one-story wooden porch that spans most of the entire front of the house. The front of the house is symmetrical.

The Lottie Moon House is part of the historic neighborhood that surrounds Miami University. The house was built as a residence, but after Lottie Moon became famous for being a Confederate spy during the American Civil War, the house was deemed of historic importance, and it was donated to Miami University to be a part of their campus.

Miami has redacted the name of this property after historical research as of 2020 did not support her actually living at this address.

== Lottie Moon ==
Cynthia Charlotte Moon, known as Lottie, was a young girl when her family moved into the residency at 220 East High Street. Lottie and her sister, Virginia "Ginnie" Moon, became famous as a Confederate spies. Among other colorful incidents, Lottie once rode in President Abraham Lincoln's personal carriage disguised as "Lady Hull", a rheumatic English invalid. She pretended to be asleep while President Lincoln and Secretary of War, Edwin M. Stanton, discussed upcoming strategies.

The two Union men believed that they were taking Lady Hull to the South for a warm springs treatment for her sickness. Stanton offered $10,000 for the capture of Lottie Moon after realizing Lady Hull was Lottie Moon.

== Past residents ==
The Moon family was the first and most famous family to reside at 220 East High Street. Robert Moon, Lottie's father, moved his family into the house in 1839, and they lived as a family in the house until 1849. In 1849, Robert Moon offered the house as a gift to Lottie upon the announcement of her engagement to James Clark. The Clark's home was used as a stopping place for Southern couriers. Later, Lottie moved to the South to be closer to the front lines and better able to relay messages. Robert Moon and his family continued to live in the house until his death in 1856.

Dr. John Hall, president of Miami University from 1855 to 1866, moved into the house with his family. They lived in this house until his resignation from presidency. In 1870, Milo Sawyer, a retired oil cloth manufacturer moved into the house with his wife, Fannie, and their two children. He was a university professor and resided in the house for two years.

Sutton C. Richey bought the house from Milo Sawyer in 1873. Richey was a druggist. His wife, Rella, and their three children lived in the house. Richey had a practice in the McCullough Building located at 20 East High Street from 1859 until 1891. When Mr. Richey died, Rella lived in the house with their daughter, Jennie, until Rella's son, Samuel Webster Richey, took the house for himself. Samuel passed it on to his son, Sheffield Clay Richey, who donated the house to Miami University in 1988 with his sons, Sheffield Jr. and Tom Richey, representing him. The Lottie Moon House was recognized as a piece of historic property and accepted by Provost E. Fred Carlisle. At the donation ceremony Provost Carlisle announced that "Miami University values its Oxford heritage very much. This house demonstrates the richness of that heritage."

== Details of Lottie Moon House ==
The house was originally a residence, but now is used as a historic site for the City of Oxford, Ohio. There is a partial basement. The foundation is stone block, and the wall is brick bearing. The exterior material brick is American bond, and the roof type is truncated hip with asphalt shingles.

The wooden porch on the front of the house is single story and spans the entire front of the house. The windows are six feet by six feet. There are three on the second story, and two surrounding the front door on the first story.

The house faces the Miami University campus. There is a fence around the premises with a gate topped with a lion's head that was made by Sutton C. Richey, a former owner.
