= Cynthia Charlotte Moon =

American Civil War spy (1828–1895)

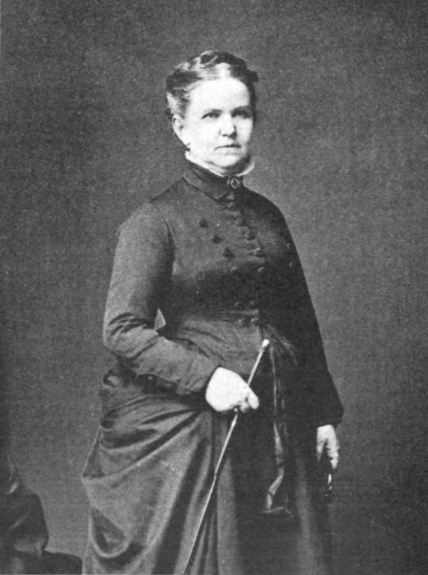
- Born: August 10, 1828; Danville, Virginia
- Died: November 20, 1895 (aged 67); Philadelphia, Pennsylvania
- Occupations: Actress, journalist
- Spouse: James Clark
- Relatives: Virginia Bethel Moon (sister)

Cynthia Charlotte Moon (1828–1895) was born in Danville, Virginia, on August 10, 1828. She and her sister, Virginia Moon, are best known for their role as Confederate spies during the American Civil War. When the girls were young, their father sold their slaves and moved the family north to Oxford, Ohio, where they lived in the house that is known as the "Lottie Moon House." As spies for the Confederacy, Lottie and Ginnie smuggled information and medicine from North to South.

== Early life ==
Moon performed in amateur plays, often using her skills as a ventriloquist. As a young woman, she was engaged to a young officer (and later Union general), Ambrose E. Burnside, whom she left at the altar. When the minister asked if she took Burnside as her husband, it is claimed that she answered "No siree, Bob!" Later, she was engaged to sixteen Confederate soldiers at once in an effort to allow them to at least die happily.

== Espionage career ==
Before the American Civil War, Moon married Judge James Clark. Her younger sister lived with them briefly after being expelled from her school for her pro-Confederacy views. The Clarks' home was a stopping point for Confederate couriers, and Moon began her espionage career when a letter needed to be delivered but no courier was available. Throughout the war, both sisters used various disguises. Various anecdotal incidents include spying on President Abraham Lincoln, passing herself off as a traveling British subject with forged papers, pretending to be in horrible pain due to a dislocated jaw, and hiding medicine and pain relievers in her quilted hoop skirts. Once, the sisters and their mother were caught by Moon's jilted ex-fiancé, General Burnside. He kept them under house arrest, but eventually released them.

== Post-war ==
After the war, Moon moved to New York with her husband, Jim Clark. They had one son, Franklin Pinckney Clark. Moon began a second career as a journalist, eventually covering the Franco-Prussian War from various capitals in Europe.

She died in Philadelphia on November 20, 1895, and was survived by her son and her sister.
