= Elizabeth Baker (economist) =

American economist

Elizabeth Faulkner Baker
- Born: 10 December 1885; Abilene, Kansas, United States
- Died: 30 January 1973 (aged 87); Portland, Oregon, United States

Academic background
- Education: University of California (LL.B.); Columbia University (M.A., Ph.D.)
- Influences: Frederick Winslow Taylor

Academic work
- Institutions: Barnard College

Signature
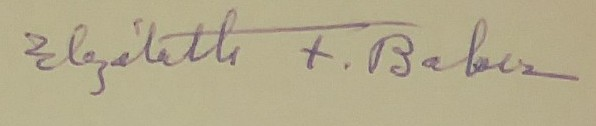

Elizabeth Faulkner Baker (10 December 1885 – 30 January 1973) was an American economist and academic who specialized in scientific management and the relationship between employment and technological change, especially the role of women.

== Personal life and education ==
Baker was born of New England parents in Abilene, Kansas, on 10 December 1885 and served as dean of women and instructor in economics at Lewiston State Normal School (1915–17) and then dean of women at Ellensburg State Normal School (1917–18) while earning her Bachelor of Laws degree from the University of California in 1918. She received her M.A. in economics from Columbia University in 1919 and her Ph.D. in economics from the same university in 1925 while teaching at Barnard College.

== Career ==
Baker remained at Barnard for the rest of her career, serving as chair of the Department of Economics from 1940 until her retirement in 1952. During World War II, she served as a hearing officer for the National War Labor Board. She joined the Taylor Society, a group dedicated to the ideas of scientific management as espoused by Frederick Winslow Taylor, in the late 1920s and Baker was director of its New York section in 1944–46.
