= Virginia Bethel Moon =

American Civil War spy (1844–1925)

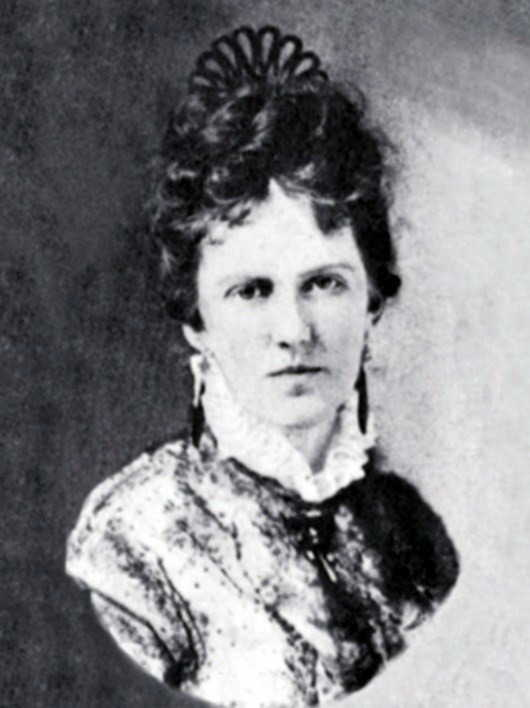
- Born: July 22, 1844; Oxford, Ohio
- Died: September 11, 1925 (aged 81); New York City
- Resting place: Memphis, Tennessee
- Occupations: Confederate Army spy, philanthropist, actor
- Relatives: Charlotte "Lottie" Moon (sister)

Virginia Bethel Moon (1844–1925), is a Confederate Army spy, philanthropist and actor. When she was young, her family lived in what is now known as the "Lottie Moon House." She moved to Memphis, Tennessee with her mother in 1862 where she began a short but notable career as an espionage agent working with Memphis entrepreneur-turned-soldier Nathan Bedford Forrest and other Confederates, including her sister, Charlotte "Lottie" Moon. When the Union forces occupied the city, she was arrested for spying but escaped with the help of her sister. She continued her work further south and was eventually imprisoned in New Orleans. Moon returned to Memphis after the war and became a philanthropist, particularly helping with the yellow fever epidemics of the 1870s. In the early days of silent film, at the age of 75, Moon acted in several movies, including Robin Hood and The Spanish Dancer. She died in New York City in 1925.

== Early life ==
From a young age, Moon was extremely adventurous. She attended the Oxford Female Institute. While there, Moon was kicked out after she shot the stars out of the American Flag and scratched a pro-Jefferson Davis message on a local store window with a ring.

== Espionage career ==
During the American Civil War, Moon was sent to live with her much older sister, "Lottie" Moon Clark in Ohio after she was expelled from school. The Clark's home was a stopping point for Confederate couriers. Moon eventually moved to Memphis, Tennessee. Eventually, both sisters began to help move information back and forth from the North and South and smuggled much-needed quinine and morphine into the Confederacy. They often disguised themselves. Once they were caught smuggling medicine quilted into their voluminous hoop skirts. On a mission together, the sisters were captured. Moon had written message hidden on her person. When the men who captured her insisted that the women be searched, Moon pulled a gun on them and threatening to shoot any of the men who attempted to search her. When the men went to find a woman to search them, the women were left alone. In those few minutes, Moon dipped the message in water and ate it. On another occasion, Moon, her sister, and her mother were caught by her sister Lottie's jilted fiancé, General Ambrose Burnside, who kept them under house arrest for several months, but never pressed charges.

== Post-War ==
After the war, she ran a boarding house and was considered a heroine in the 1870s yellow fever epidemics. In her 70s, she decided that she wanted to act again, now for the new silent film industry. She found producer Jesse Lasky and asked for a job. In response to his inquiries about her ability to act, she informed him that, at age 75, she had already "acted all the parts". She was found dead at age 81 in New York with her cat sitting next to her.
