= James P. Boyle =

American businessman and politician (1885-1939)

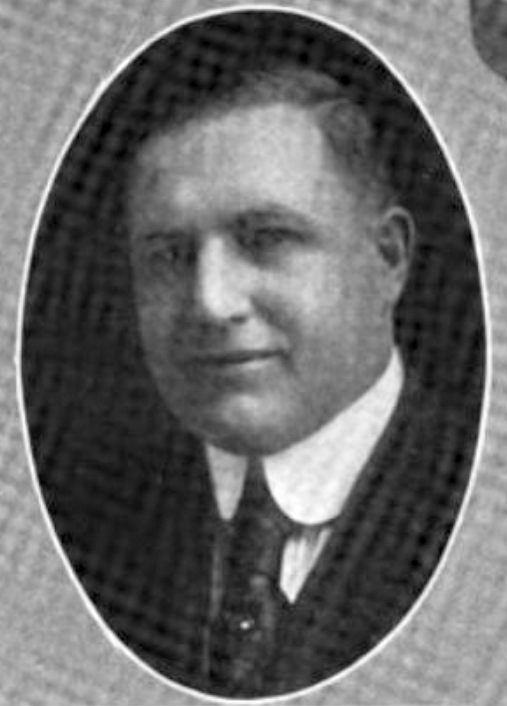

Member of the Illinois House of Representatives
- In office 1918 – September 24, 1939

Personal details
- Born: James Peter Boyle; September 15, 1885 Chicago, Illinois
- Died: September 24, 1939 (aged 54) Chicago, Illinois
- Party: Democratic
- Spouse: Lillian R. Keane (m. 1916)
- Occupation: Politician

James Peter Boyle (September 15, 1885 – September 24, 1939) was an American businessman and politician.

== Biography ==
He was born in Chicago, Illinois on 15 September 1885 to Michael Joseph Boyle and Mary Killigrew. On June 24, 1916, in Chicago, Illinois he married Lillian R. Keane.

Boyle worked in the insurance business. Boyle was involved in the Democratic Party. He was also president of the Chicago Board of Local Improvements. Boyle served in the Illinois House of Representatives from 1919 until his death in 1939.

Boyle died suddenly in his home on September 24, 1939.
