= Oscar Rathbun =

Oscar Jenckes Rathbun

Lieutenant governor of Rhode Island
- In office May 29, 1883 – May 26, 1885
- Governor: Augustus O. Bourn
- Preceded by: Henry Fay
- Succeeded by: Lucius B. Darling

Personal details
- Born: March 12, 1832 Woonsocket, Rhode Island
- Died: February 1, 1892 (aged 59) Providence, Rhode Island
- Party: Republican
- Profession: Businessman

Oscar Jenckes Rathbun (March 12, 1832 – February 1, 1892) was an American businessman and politician, serving as the Lieutenant Governor of Rhode Island from 1883 to 1885.

== Early life ==
Rathbun was born on March 12, 1832, a son of Aaron and Julia (Jenckes) Rathbun. He attended Worcester High School in Massachusetts and the Clinton Liberal Institute in New York. He then worked in his father's goods store. After his father's death, he left to work in the banking industry. He was a teller at Woonsocket Falls National Bank and then at Citizens' National Bank. By 1860, he was also Treasurer at the Citizens' Savings Bank . However, he only saw the banking industry as a stepping stone to making a career as an entrepreneur. From 1860, he worked in the clothing industry. He became president of Harris Woolen Company and the Household Sewing Machine Company and the Woonsocket Streetcar Company. He also became head of the Citizens' National Bank and thus remained partly in the banking business. By the early 1870s, Rathbun was one of the leading industrialists in Woonsocket. In addition to the activities already mentioned, he sat on the board of directors or was a director of various other companies. These included insurance companies, railroads, the Woonsocket Gas Company, and many others.

== Politics ==
Rathbun was a member of the Republican Party. He served in the Rhode Island Senate from 1880 to 1882. In 1882, he was elected lieutenant governor of Rhode Island alongside Augustus O. Bourn. He held this office between 1883 and 1885. He was Deputy Governor and Chairman of the State Senate. After his time as lieutenant governor, he retired from politics in order to devote himself more to his business. However, he began to suffer from heart problems. In 1891 he gave up management of the Harris Woolen Company. He continued to hold other positions. On February 1, 1892, he was in Providence to attend the annual meeting of the Providence and Worcester Railroad Company to attend. On this occasion, he was re-elected to the board of directors. In the afternoon of the same day he felt unwell and wanted to return to Woonsocket. But he only made it to the train station, where he suddenly died.

== Personal life ==
Rathbun was married to Rachel Farnum Harris, the daughter of industrialist Edward Harris.
