= Augustus O. Bourn =

American politician

Augustus Osborn Bourn
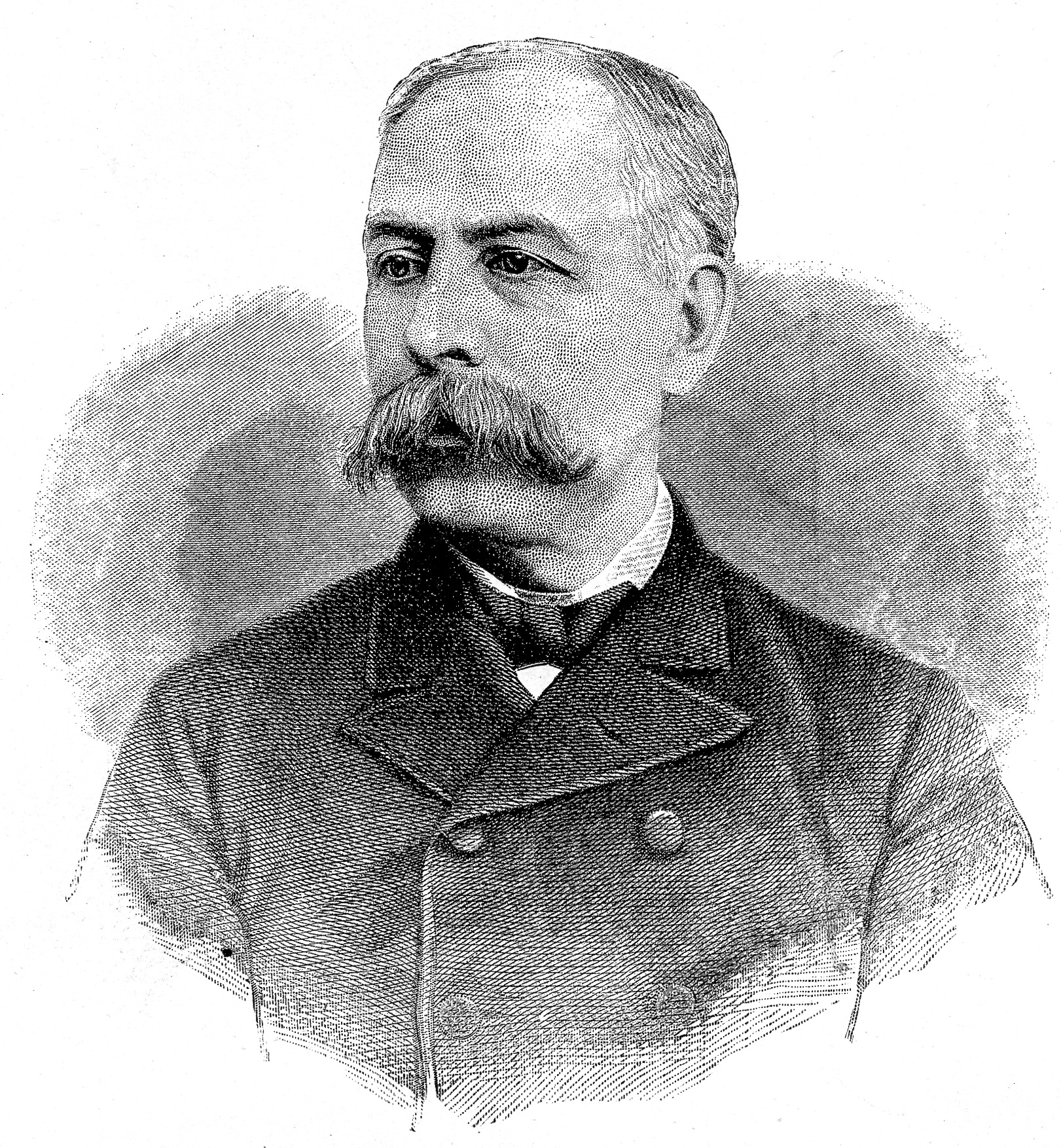

36th Governor of Rhode Island
- In office May 29, 1883 – May 26, 1885
- Lieutenant Governor: Oscar Rathbun
- Preceded by: Alfred H. Littlefield
- Succeeded by: George P. Wetmore

Member of the Rhode Island Senate
- In office 1876–1883; 1886–1888

Personal details
- Born: October 1, 1834 Providence, Rhode Island, U.S.
- Died: January 29, 1925 (aged 90)
- Resting place: Swan Point Cemetery
- Party: Republican
- Spouse: Elizabeth R. Morrill
- Education: Brown University
- Profession: Businessman

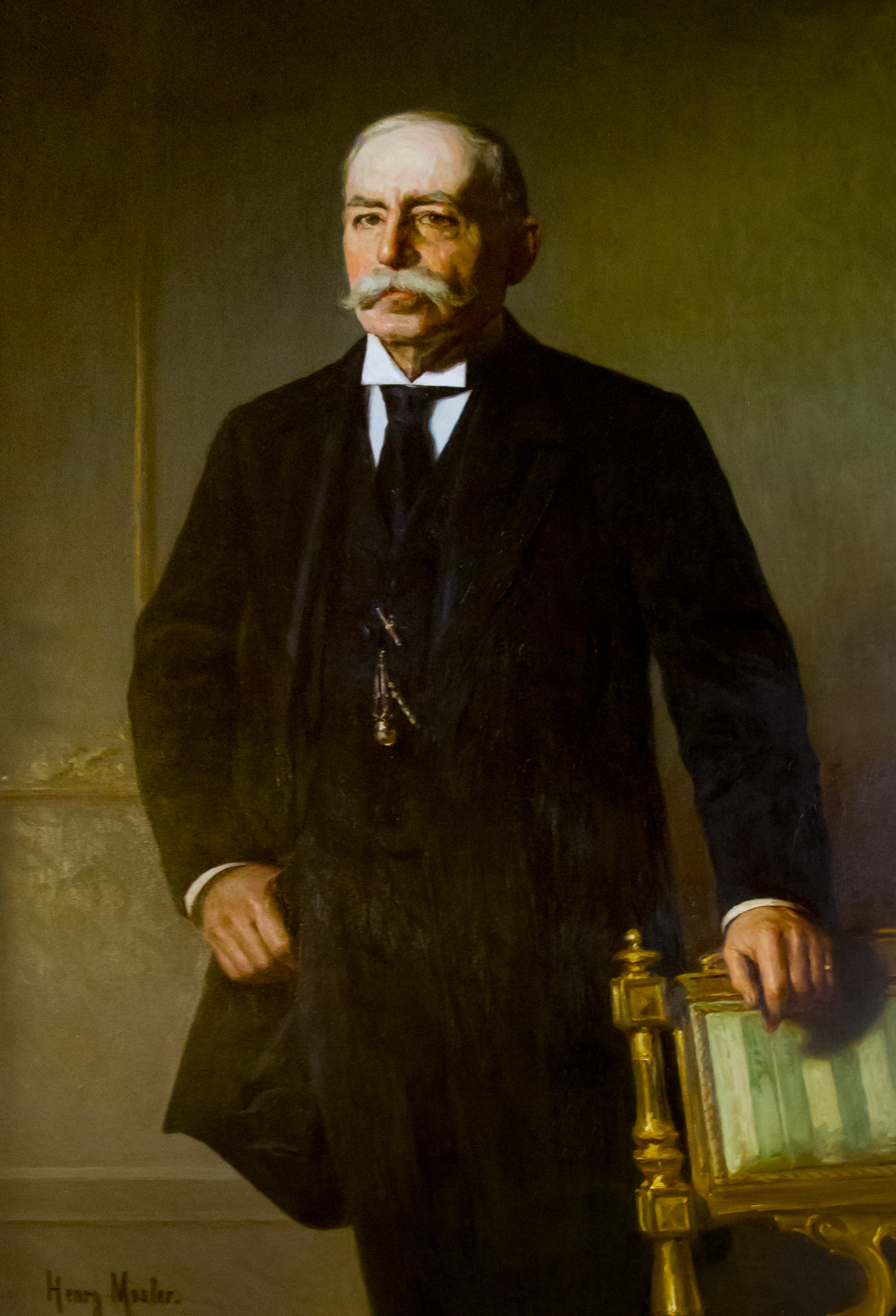
Bourn's official State House portrait

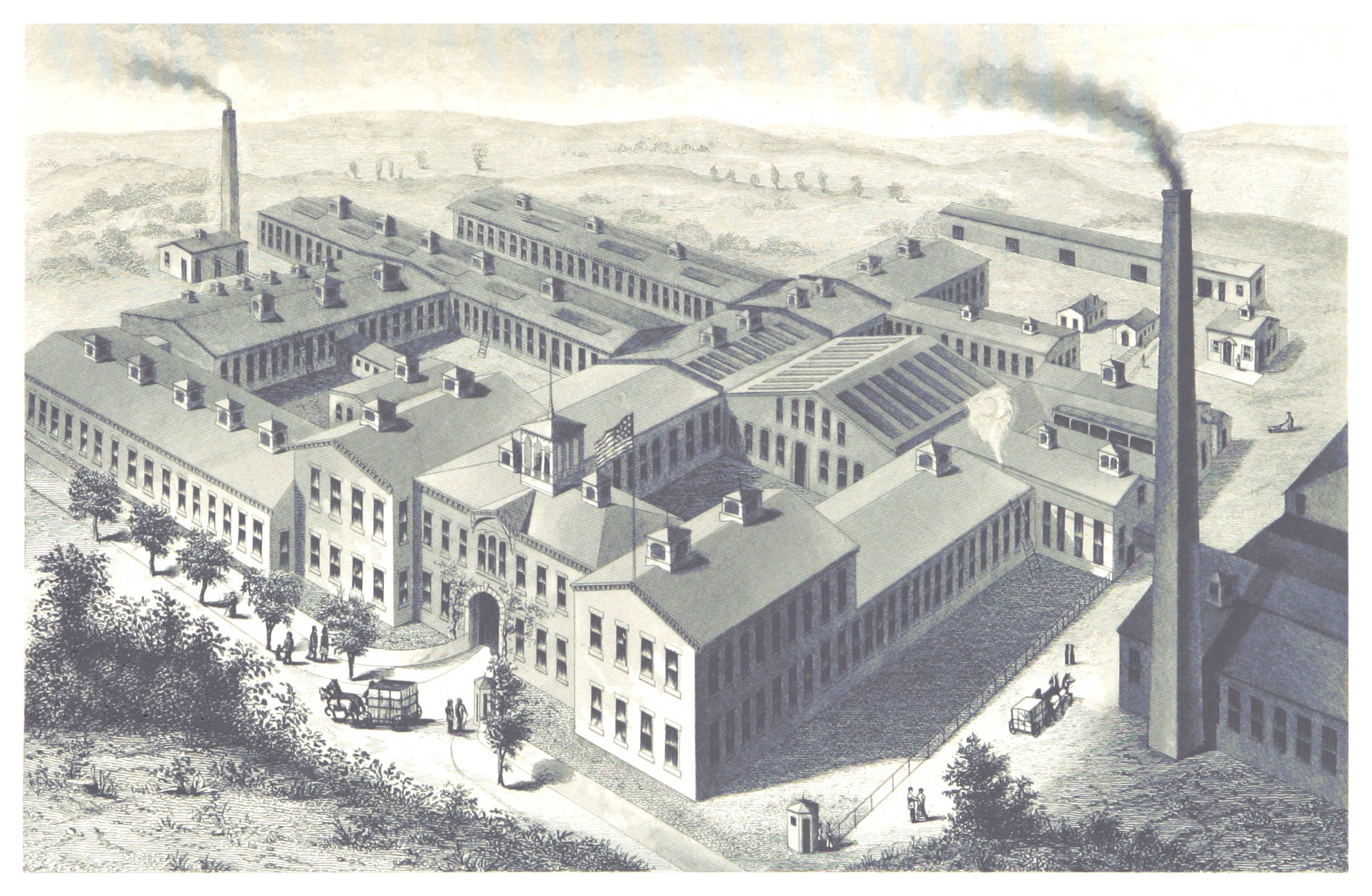
Bourn's NATIONAL RUBBER COMPANY, in Bristol, RI.

Augustus Osborn Bourn (October 1, 1834 – January 29, 1925) was an American politician and the 36th governor of Rhode Island.

== Early life ==
Bourn was born in Providence, Rhode Island, on October 1, 1834. He was the son of George O. Bourn and Huldah B. (Eddy) Bourn and married Elizabeth R. Morrill February 24, 1863. He and his wife had five children. He graduated from Brown University and later established a successful career in rubber business, where he started in his father's company. He continued the business after his father's death and incorporated it as the Providence Rubber Company. He also founded the National Rubber Company, which later merged with the former company.

== Military service ==
During the Civil War, Bourn enlisted in the Rhode Island Militia but did not see active service with the Union Army. On April 18, 1864, he was elected as paymaster, with rank of 2nd lieutenant, in the Providence Horse Guards (PHG). On April 17, 1865, he was commissioned a first lieutenant in Company A of the PHG. On April 20, 1868, he was elected as captain of Company A and two years later he became captain of Company B. In 1871 he returned his previous position as captain of Company A.

On April 20, 1874, he was commissioned as major of the PHG. On May 13, 1878, he was commissioned as lieutenant colonel in command of the 1st Squadron of Cavalry. He held that position until he took office as Governor of Rhode Island in 1883.

== Political career ==
Bourn was a Republican and was member of the Rhode Island State Senate in 1876–83 and again in 1886–88. He held the governor's office from May 29, 1883, to May 26, 1885. During his administration, a constitutional amendment was proposed to extend suffrage to naturalized citizens. He was the author of this amendment. Later this constitutional amendment became well known as the Bourn Amendment.

Bourn was an active member of the Freemasons.

== Later years ==
In 1873, Bourn built an opulent Gothic revival mansion in Bristol named Seven Oaks. The mansion was designed by James Renwick, best known for designing the Smithsonian Castle and St. Patrick's Cathedral, and is located at 136 Hope Street near the Herreshoff boat yard.

Bourn was United States Consul General in Rome from 1889 until 1893 under the administration of President Benjamin Harrison.

In 1897 he was elected as a compatriot of the Rhode Island Society of the Sons of the American Revolution.

Governor Bourn died on January 29, 1925 and was buried at Swan Point Cemetery in Providence.

== Sources ==
- Sobel, Robert and John Raimo. Biographical Directory of the Governors of the United States, 1789–1978. Greenwood Press, 1988. ISBN 0-313-28093-2
- Biography of Governor Bourn

Party political offices
Preceded by Alfred H. Littlefield	Republican nominee for Governor of Rhode Island; 1883, 1884	Succeeded by George P. Wetmore
Political offices
Preceded by Alfred H. Littlefield	Governor of Rhode Island; 1883–1885	Succeeded by George P. Wetmore
