= 1881 in the United States =

- Decades: 1860s; 1870s; 1880s; 1890s; 1900s
- See also: History of the United States (1865–1918); Timeline of United States history (1860–1899); List of years in the United States

Events from the year 1881 in the United States. For the second time in history (after 1841), the country had three different presidents in one calendar year: Rutherford B. Hayes, James A. Garfield, and Chester A. Arthur.

== Incumbents ==
=== Federal government ===
- President:

Rutherford B. Hayes (R-Ohio) (until March 4)
James A. Garfield (R-Ohio) (March 4 – September 19)
Chester A. Arthur (R-New York) (starting September 19)

- Vice President:

William A. Wheeler (R-New York) (until March 4)
Chester A. Arthur (R-New York) (March 4 – September 19)
vacant (starting September 19)

- Chief Justice: Morrison Waite (originally from Connecticut; lived in U.S. state of Ohio)
- Speaker of the House of Representatives:

Samuel J. Randall (D-Pennsylvania) (until March 4)
J. Warren Keifer (R-Ohio) (starting December 5)

- Congress: 46th (until March 4), 47th (starting March 4)

==== State governments ====
Governors and lieutenant governors

=== Governors ===
- Governor of Alabama: Rufus W. Cobb (Democratic)
- Governor of Arkansas: William Read Miller (Democratic) (until January 11), Thomas James Churchill (Democratic) (starting January 11)
- Governor of California: George Clement Perkins (Republican)
- Governor of Colorado: Frederick Walker Pitkin (Republican)
- Governor of Connecticut: Charles B. Andrews (Republican) (until January 5), Hobart B. Bigelow (Republican) (starting January 5)
- Governor of Delaware: John W. Hall (Democratic)
- Governor of Florida: George Franklin Drew (Democratic) (until January 4), William D. Bloxham (Democratic) (starting January 4)
- Governor of Georgia: Alfred H. Colquitt (Democratic)
- Governor of Illinois: Shelby Moore Cullom (Republican)
- Governor of Indiana: Isaac P. Gray (Democratic) (until January 10), Albert G. Porter (Republican) (starting January 10)
- Governor of Iowa: John H. Gear (Republican)
- Governor of Kansas: John P. St. John (Republican)
- Governor of Kentucky: Luke P. Blackburn (Democratic)
- Governor of Louisiana: Louis A. Wiltz (Democratic) (until October 16), Samuel D. McEnery (Democratic) (starting October 16)
- Governor of Maine: Daniel F. Davis (Republican) (until January 13), Harris M. Plaisted (Democratic) (starting January 13)
- Governor of Maryland: William T. Hamilton (Democratic)
- Governor of Massachusetts: John Davis Long (Republican)
- Governor of Michigan: Charles Croswell (Republican) (until January 1), David Jerome (Republican) (starting January 1)
- Governor of Minnesota: John S. Pillsbury (Republican)
- Governor of Mississippi: John M. Stone (Democratic)
- Governor of Missouri: John Smith Phelps (Democratic) (until January 10), Thomas Theodore Crittenden (Democratic) (starting January 10)
- Governor of Nebraska: Albinus Nance (Republican)
- Governor of Nevada: John Henry Kinkead (Republican)
- Governor of New Hampshire: Natt Head (Republican) (until June 2), Charles H. Bell (Republican) (starting June 2)
- Governor of New Jersey: George B. McClellan (Democratic) (until January 18), George C. Ludlow (Democratic) (starting January 18)
- Governor of New York: Alonzo B. Cornell (Republican)
- Governor of North Carolina: Thomas Jordan Jarvis (Democratic)
- Governor of Ohio: Charles Foster (Republican)
- Governor of Oregon: W. W. Thayer (Democratic)
- Governor of Pennsylvania: Henry M. Hoyt (Republican)
- Governor of Rhode Island: Alfred H. Littlefield (Republican)
- Governor of South Carolina: Johnson Hagood (Democratic)
- Governor of Tennessee: Albert S. Marks (Democratic) (until January 17), Alvin Hawkins (Republican) (starting January 17)
- Governor of Texas: Oran M. Roberts (Democratic)
- Governor of Vermont: Roswell Farnham (Republican)
- Governor of Virginia: Frederick W. M. Holliday (Democratic)
- Governor of West Virginia: Henry M. Mathews (Democratic) (until March 4), Jacob B. Jackson (Democratic) (starting March 4)
- Governor of Wisconsin: William E. Smith (Republican)

=== Lieutenant governors ===
- Lieutenant Governor of California: John Mansfield (Republican)
- Lieutenant Governor of Colorado: Horace Austin Warner Tabor (Republican)
- Lieutenant Governor of Connecticut: David Gallup (Republican) (until January 5), William H. Bulkeley (Republican) (starting January 5)
- Lieutenant Governor of Florida: vacant (until month and day unknown), Livingston W. Bethel (no political party) (starting month and day unknown)
- Lieutenant Governor of Illinois: Andrew Shuman (Republican) (until January 10), John Marshall Hamilton (Republican) (starting January 10)
- Lieutenant Governor of Indiana:
  - until January 8: Fredrick Vieche (Democratic)
  - January 8-10: vacant
  - starting January 10: Thomas Hanna (Republican)
- Lieutenant Governor of Iowa: Frank T. Campbell (Republican)
- Lieutenant Governor of Kansas: Lyman U. Humphrey (Republican) (until month and day unknown), David Wesley Finney (Republican) (starting month and day unknown)
- Lieutenant Governor of Kentucky: James E. Cantrill (Democratic)
- Lieutenant Governor of Louisiana:
  - until October 16: Samuel D. McEnery (Democratic)
  - October 16-December 24: William A. Robertson (Democratic)
  - starting December 24: George L. Walton (Democratic)
- Lieutenant Governor of Massachusetts: Byron Weston (Republican)
- Lieutenant Governor of Michigan: Alonzo Sessions (Republican) (until month and day unknown), Moreau S. Crosby (Republican) (starting month and day unknown)
- Lieutenant Governor of Minnesota: Charles A. Gilman (Republican)
- Lieutenant Governor of Mississippi: William H. Sims (Democratic)
- Lieutenant Governor of Missouri: Henry Clay Brockmeyer (Democratic) (until January 10), Robert Alexander Campbell (Democratic) (starting January 10)
- Lieutenant Governor of Nebraska: Edmund C. Carns (Republican)
- Lieutenant Governor of Nevada: Jewett W. Adams (Democratic)
- Lieutenant Governor of New York: George Gilbert Hoskins (Republican)
- Lieutenant Governor of North Carolina: James L. Robinson (Democratic)
- Lieutenant Governor of Ohio: Andrew Hickenlooper (Republican)
- Lieutenant Governor of Pennsylvania: Charles Warren Stone (Republican)
- Lieutenant Governor of Rhode Island: Henry Fay (political party unknown)
- Lieutenant Governor of South Carolina: John D. Kennedy (Democratic)
- Lieutenant Governor of Tennessee: John R. Neal (Democratic) (until month and day unknown), George H. Morgan (Democratic) (starting month and day unknown)
- Lieutenant Governor of Texas: Joseph Draper Sayers (Democratic) (until month and day unknown), Leonidas J. Storey (Democratic) (starting month and day unknown)
- Lieutenant Governor of Vermont: John L. Barstow (Republican)
- Lieutenant Governor of Virginia: James A. Walker (Democratic)
- Lieutenant Governor of Wisconsin: James M. Bingham (Republican)

== Events ==
=== January–March ===
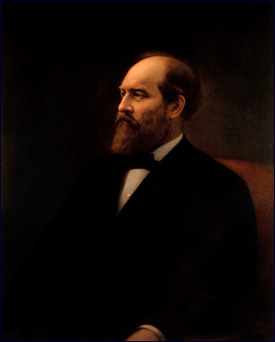
March 4: James A. Garfield becomes the 20th U.S. president

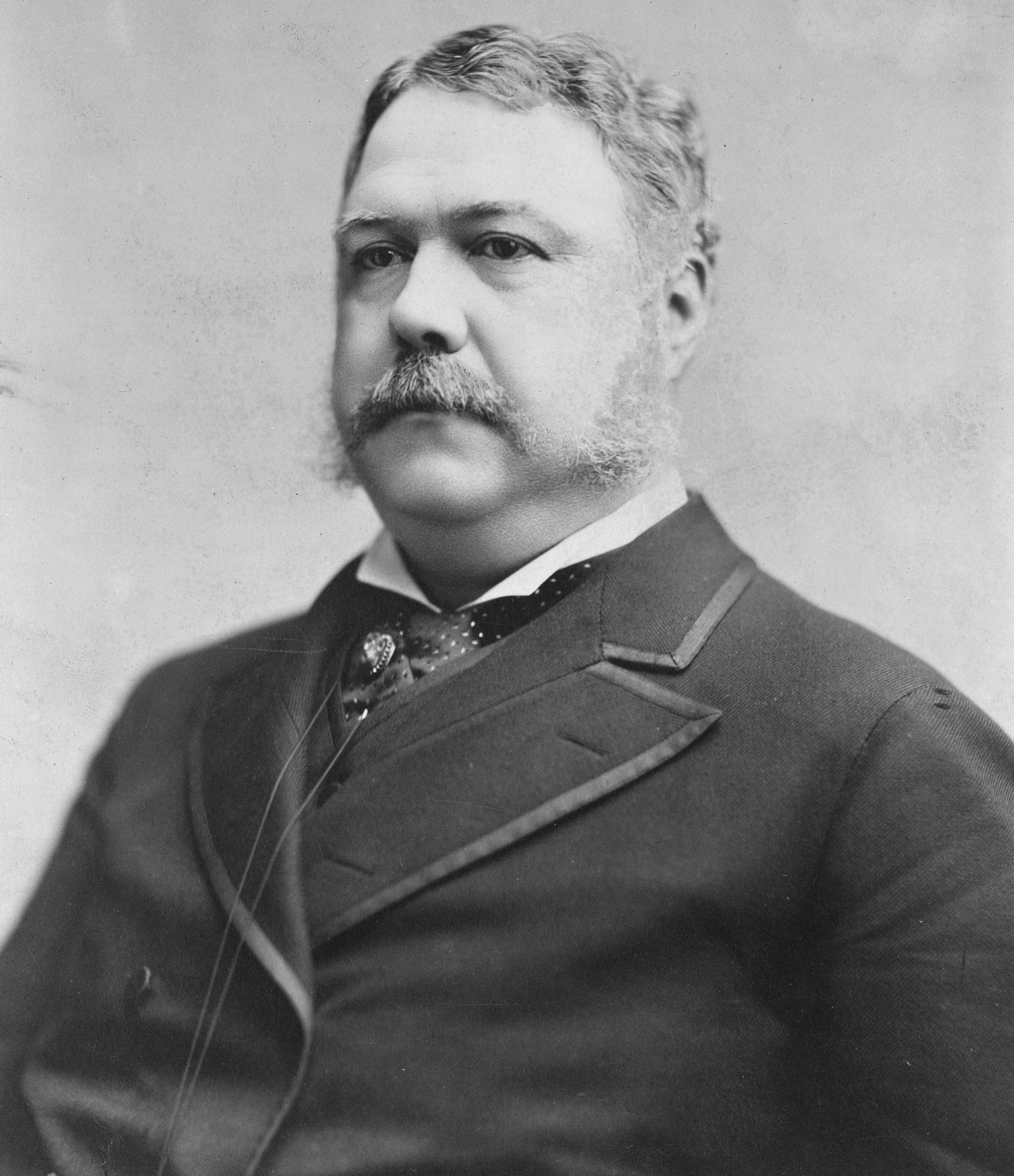
Chester A. Arthur becomes the 20th U.S. vice president

- January 25 – Thomas Edison and Alexander Graham Bell form the Oriental Telephone Company.
- February 2 – The 5.6 M_{la} Parkfield earthquake affects central California with a maximum Mercalli intensity of VII (Very strong). Some damage occurred near Imusdale northwest of Parkfield, including cracks in the roads, fallen chimneys, and partially collapsed buildings.
- February 5 – Phoenix, Arizona, is incorporated.
- February 14 – Pine City, Minnesota, is incorporated.
- February 19 – Kansas becomes the first U.S. state to prohibit all alcoholic beverages.
- February 22 – Cleopatra's Needle is erected in Central Park, New York City.
- March – Barnum & Bailey's "Greatest Show on Earth" opens in Madison Square Garden.
- March 4 – James A. Garfield is sworn in as the 20th president of the United States, and Chester A. Arthur is sworn in as the 20th vice president.
- March 15 – First plots of Abilene, Texas, are auctioned; the town is incorporated later in the year.

=== April–June ===
- April 11 – Spelman College is established.
- April 14 – The Four Dead in Five Seconds Gunfight erupts in El Paso, Texas.
- April 16 – Bat Masterson fights his last gun battle in Dodge City, Kansas.
- April 21 – The University of Connecticut is founded as the Storrs Agricultural School.
- April 28 – Billy the Kid escapes from his two jailers at the Lincoln County Jail in Lincoln, New Mexico, killing James Bell and Robert Ollinger before stealing a horse and riding out of town.
- May 21
  - The American Red Cross is established by Clara Barton.
  - The United States Tennis Association (USNLTA) is established by a small group of tennis club members; the first U.S. Tennis Championships are played this year.
  - Former United States Senator Blanche Kelso Bruce is the first African-American to have his signature on American paper currency. He becomes the Register of the United States Treasury on May 21, 1881.
- June 12 – The USS Jeannette is crushed in an Arctic Ocean ice pack.

=== July–September ===
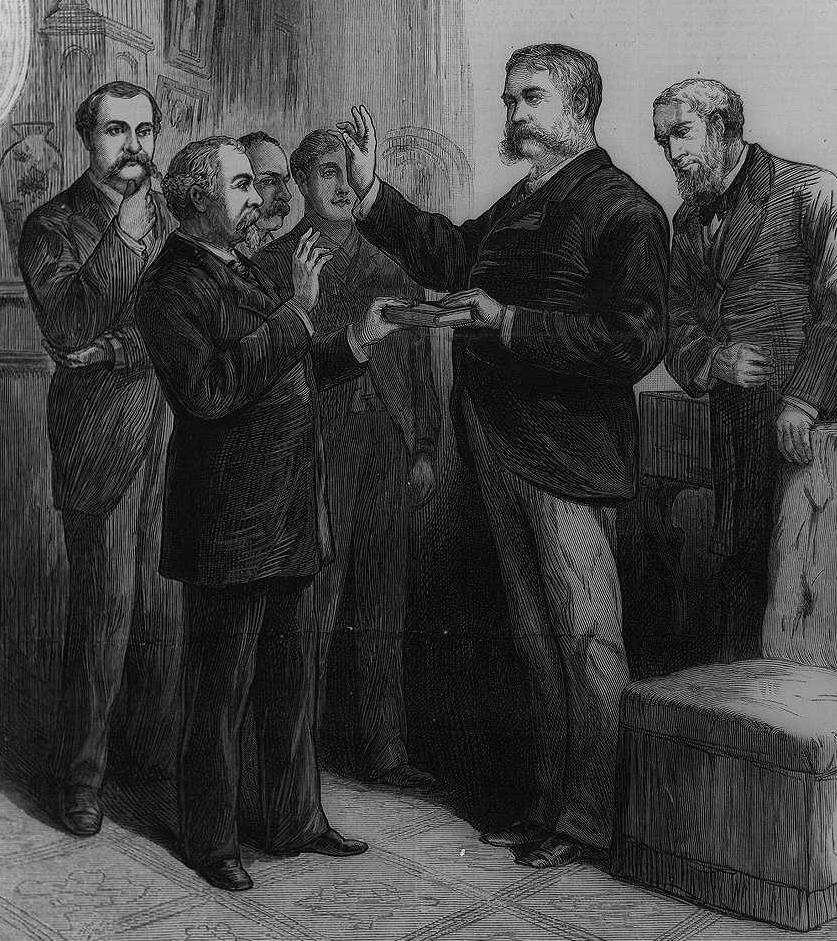
September 19: Vice President Chester A. Arthur becomes the 21st U.S. president after the death of Garfield

- July 2 – Assassination of James A. Garfield: James A. Garfield, President of the United States, is shot by lawyer Charles J. Guiteau at the Baltimore and Potomac Railroad Station in Washington, D.C. He survives the shooting but suffers from infection of his wound, dying on September 19.
- July 4 – The Tuskegee Institute opens in Alabama.
- July 14 – Billy the Kid is shot and killed by Pat Garrett outside Fort Sumner.
- July 20 – Indian Wars: Sioux chief Sitting Bull leads the last of his fugitive people in surrender to United States troops at Fort Buford in Montana.
- Summer – First ever summer camp held, on Chocorua Island in Grafton County, New Hampshire.
- August 27 – The fifth hurricane of the 1881 Atlantic hurricane season hits Florida and the Carolinas, killing about 700.
- September 5 – The Thumb Fire in the U.S. state of Michigan destroys over a million acres (4,000 km²) and kills 282 people.
- September 12 – Francis Howell High School (Howell Institute) in St. Charles, Missouri, and Stephen F. Austin High School in Austin, Texas, open on the same day, putting them in a tie for the title of the oldest public high school west of the Mississippi River.
- September 19 – President James A. Garfield dies weeks after being shot. Vice President Chester A. Arthur becomes the 21st president of the United States.

=== October–December ===
- October 5–December 31 – International Cotton Exposition in Atlanta, Georgia.
- October 18–21– Yorktown Centennial is observed in Virginia; Yorktown Victory Monument cornerstone is laid.
- October 22 – Boston Symphony Orchestra gives its inaugural concert.
- October 26 – The gunfight at the O.K. Corral occurs in Tombstone, Cochise County, Arizona.
- October 29 – Judge magazine is first published.
- November 17 – The trial of Charles J. Guiteau begins in Washington, D.C.
- December 4 – The first edition of the Los Angeles Times is published.
- December 28 – Virgil Earp is ambushed in Tombstone and loses the use of his left arm.

=== Undated ===
- New York City's oldest independent school for girls, the Convent of the Sacred Heart New York (91st Street), is founded.
- Minto, North Dakota is founded.

=== Ongoing ===
- Gilded Age (1869–c. 1896)

== Sport ==
- September 16 – The Chicago White Stockings win their Second straight (third overall) pennant with a 4–0 win over the Boston Red Caps.

== Births ==
- January 8 – Henrik Shipstead, U.S. Senator from Minnesota from 1923 to 1947 (died 1960)
- January 15 – John Rodgers, U.S. Navy officer, naval aviation pioneer (died in aviation accident 1926)
- January 21 – Arch McCarthy, baseball player
- January 31 – Irving Langmuir, chemist, recipient of the Nobel Prize in Chemistry in 1932 (died 1957)
- February 17 – Bess Streeter Aldrich, fiction writer (died 1954)
- February 28 – Otto Dowling, U.S. Navy officer and 25th Governor of American Samoa (died 1946)
- March 4
  - Maude Fealy, stage and film actress (died 1971)
  - Thomas Sigismund Stribling, novelist (died 1965)
  - Richard C. Tolman, mathematical physicist (died 1948)
- March 12 – Arthur Raymond Robinson, U.S. Senator from Indiana from 1925 to 1935 (died 1961)
- March 13 – Louis Chauvin, ragtime pianist (died 1908)
- March 29 – Raymond Hood, Art Deco architect (died 1934)
- April 16 – Alice Corbin Henderson, poet (died 1949)
- May 14
  - Maude Fulton, playwright and actress (died 1950)
  - G. Murray Hulbert, politician (died 1950)
- June 9 – Marion Leonard, silent film actress (died 1956)
- July 2 – Royal Hurlburt Weller, politician (died 1929)
- July 4 – Ulysses S. Grant III, soldier and planner (died 1968)
- July 8 – Mantis James Van Sweringen, financier (died 1935)
- July 11 – Louise Marion Bosworth, social scientist (died 1982)
- July 22
  - Augusta Fox Bronner, psychologist, specialist in juvenile psychology (died 1966)
  - Kenneth Whiting, U.S. Navy officer, submarine and naval aviation pioneer (died 1943)
- July 30 – Smedley Butler, U.S. Marine Corps general (died 1940)
- August 3 – Nathan Post, 7th and 10th Governor of American Samoa (died 1938)
- August 6 – Irene Colvin Corbett, nurse and musician (died 1912)
- August 10 – Witter Bynner, poet and scholar (died 1968)
- August 12 – Cecil B. DeMille, film director (died 1959)
- August 20 – Edgar Albert Guest, poet (died 1959)
- September 8 – Harry Hillman, track athlete (died 1945)
- September 26 – Hiram Wesley Evans, Ku Klux Klan Imperial Wizard (died 1966)
- October 1 – William Boeing, engineer and airplane manufacturer (died 1956)
- October 10 – David Baird Jr., U.S. Senator from New Jersey from 1929 to 1930 (died 1955)
- October 22 – Clinton Davisson, physicist, recipient of the Nobel Prize in Physics in 1937 (died 1958)
- October 30 – Elizabeth Madox Roberts, novelist and poet (died 1941)
- November 5 – George A. Malcolm, lawyer, Associate Justice of the Supreme Court of the Philippines and educator (died 1961)
- November 9 – Margaret Reed Lewis, cell biologist (died 1970)
- November 15 – Franklin Pierce Adams (F.P.A.), columnist, critic, writer and wit, member of the Algonquin Round Table (died 1960)
- November 20 – Arthur Marshall, ragtime composer and performer (died 1968)
- December 3 – Henry Fillmore, American composer and bandleader (died 1956)
- December 5 – Martin W. Clement, president of the Pennsylvania Railroad from 1935 to 1948 (died 1966)
- December 12 – Doris Keane, stage actress (died 1945)
- December 16 – Daniel F. Steck, U.S. Senator from Iowa from 1926 to 1931 (died 1950)
- George Steidler

== Deaths ==
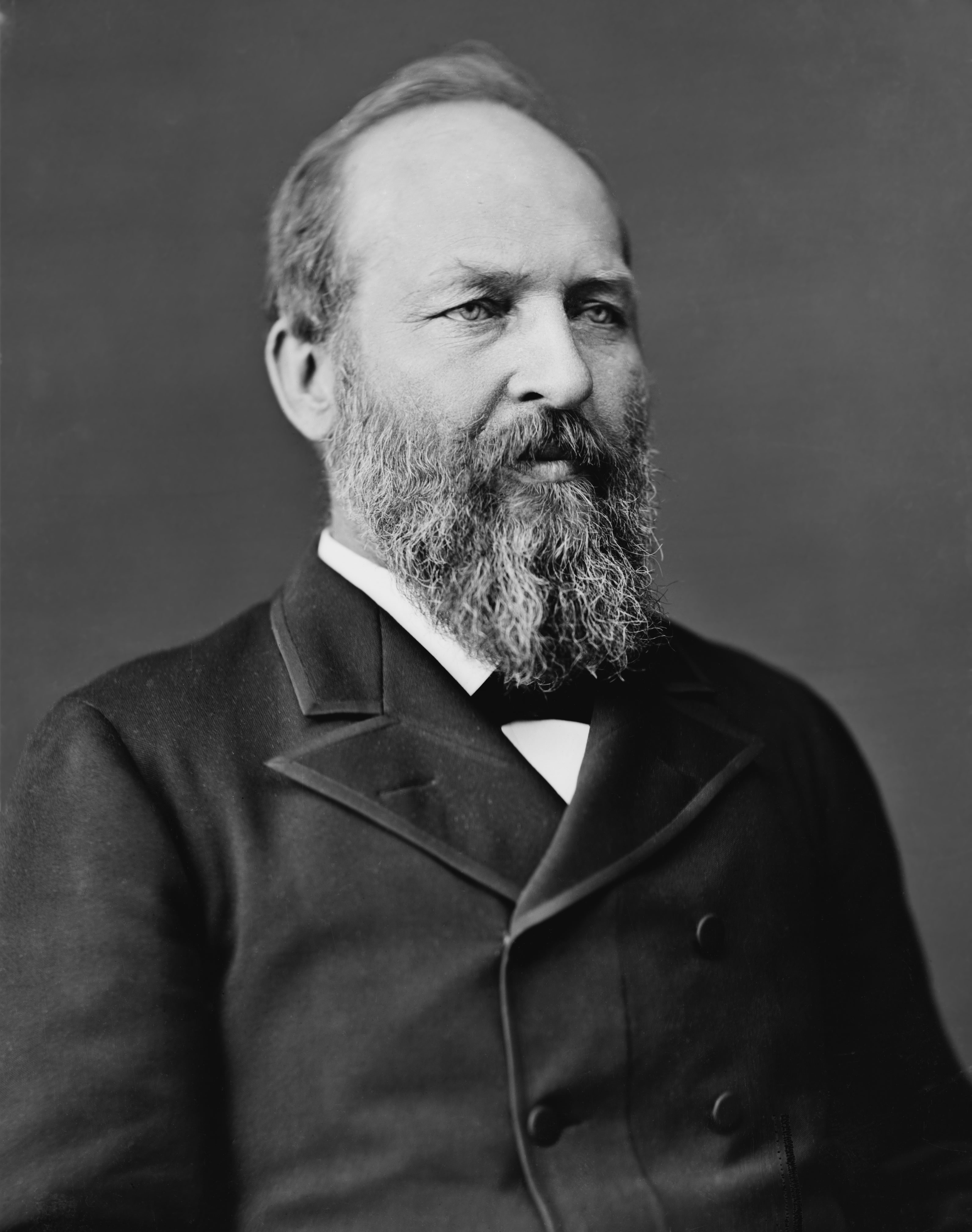
James A. Garfield

- January 3 – Anna McNeill Whistler, James Whistler's mother and subject of his painting (born 1804)
- February 14 – Fernando Wood, New York City mayor (born 1812)
- February 23 – Robert F. R. Lewis, naval officer (born 1826)
- April 24 – James T. Fields, publisher (born 1817)
- May 21 – Thomas A. Scott, industrialist (born 1823)
- June 18 – Henry S. Lane, U.S. Senator from Indiana from 1836 to 1837 and from 1854 to 1858 (born 1811)
- July 14 – Billy The Kid, Old West gunfighter (killed) (born 1859)
- July 17 – Jim Bridger, explorer and trapper (born 1804)
- August 10 – Orville Hickman Browning, U.S. Senator from Illinois from 1866 to 1869 (born 1806)
- September 7 – Sidney Lanier, musician and dialect poet (born 1842)
- September 13 – Ambrose Burnside, Union Army general, railroad executive, inventor, industrialist and Rhode Island Senator (born 1824)
- September 15 – Susan May Williams, railroad heiress, wife of Jérôme Napoléon Bonaparte (born 1812)
- September 19 – James A. Garfield, 20th president of the U.S. from March to September 1881 (assassinated) (born 1831)
- September 22 – Solomon L. Spink, U.S. Congressman from Illinois (born 1831)
- October 3 – Orson Pratt, religious leader (born 1811)
- October 8 – Joseph Carter Abbott, U.S. Senator from North Carolina from 1868 to 1871 (born 1825)
- October 12 – Josiah Gilbert Holland, novelist and poet (born 1819)
- October 16 – Chipco (Echo Emathla), Muscogee-Seminole war chief and Florida farmer (born c. 1805)
- October 26 – shot in the gunfight at the O.K. Corral
  - Billy Clanton, outlaw and brother of Ike Clanton (born 1862)
  - Frank McLaury, Old West gunman and brother of Tom McLaury (born 1849)
  - Tom McLaury, pioneer and Old West gunman (born 1853)
- October 31 – George W. DeLong, naval officer and Arctic explorer (starvation) (born 1844)
- November 23 – Abijah Gilbert, U.S. Senator from Florida from 1869 to 1875 (born 1806)
- December 4 – Wood Hite, outlaw and cousin of Jesse and Frank James (shot) (born 1850)
- December 13 – John Quidor, painter (born 1801)

== See also ==
- Timeline of United States history (1860–1899)
