= Francis T. Hord =

American politician

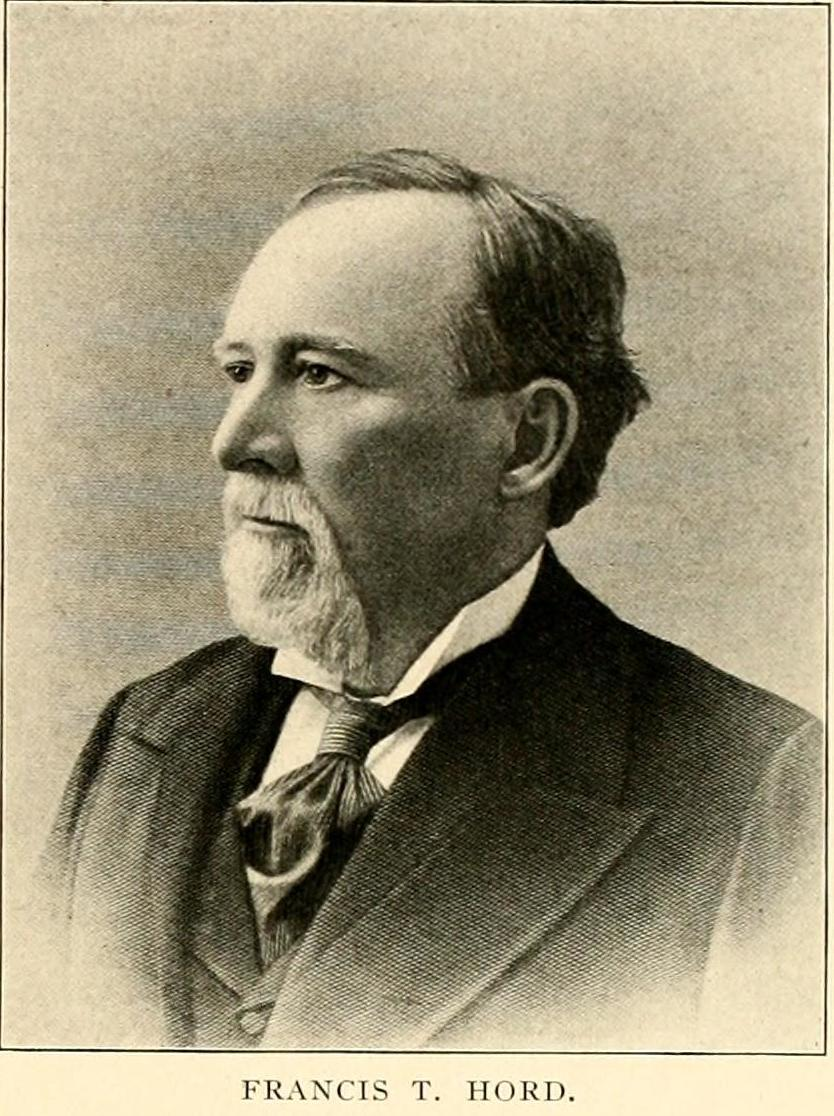

13th Indiana Attorney General
- In office November 6, 1882 – November 22, 1886
- Governor: Albert G. Porter, Isaac P. Gray
- Preceded by: Daniel P. Baldwin
- Succeeded by: Louis T. Michener

Francis Triplett Hord Jr. (November 24, 1835 – March 8, 1912) was an American lawyer, politician, and judge who served as the thirteenth Indiana Attorney General from November 6, 1882, to November 22, 1886.

== Biography ==
=== Early life and education ===
Hord was born in Maysville, Kentucky. His father, Francis Sr., was a lawyer, government surveyor of the lands of the Upper Mississippi River, judge of the Kentucky Circuit Court, director of the Bank of Northern Kentucky in Maysville, and a pro-Unionist during the Civil War. His wife, the mother of Francis Jr., Elizabeth Scott Hord, descended from a prominent family from York County, Virginia. The older brother of Francis Jr., Oscar B. Hord, also served as Indiana Attorney General from 1862 to 1864.

Hord received his legal education in Maysville at the seminary of Rand & Richeson. He graduated from the seminary in 1853 and began to read law with his father. After being admitted to the bar in 1856, he moved to Columbus, Indiana, where he opened a law office.

=== Legal and political career ===
Hord, a Democrat, was elected Prosecutor of Bartholomew County in 1858. In 1860, he was appointed Bartholomew County Attorney, a position he held for twenty years. He also served as city attorney of Columbus for four years. In 1862, Hord was elected to serve in the Indiana Senate.

In 1876, following the death of Michael C. Kerr, Governor Thomas A. Hendricks nominated Hord to fill Kerr's now vacant seat in the U.S. House of Representatives. Hord declined the offer. Hord was a Presidential Elector in 1876 and 1880. Also in 1880, he served as Chairman of the Chairman of the Indiana Democratic Party Convention held in Indianapolis. In 1882 and 1884, he traveled around the state, campaigning for Democratic politicians.

In 1882, Hord was elected Indiana Attorney General, succeeding Daniel P. Baldwin. Hord served two terms, re-elected in 1884. He served in the position for four years under Governors Albert G. Porter (a Republican) and Isaac P. Gray (a Democrat). During his time as Attorney General, Hord wrote a number of opinions on various questions surrounding Indiana law. The Indiana General Assembly later published these opinions. Hord was succeeded to the office by Louis T. Michener. The Deputy Attorney General during Hord's term was his son, William Banfield Hord. In May 1886, a few months before he left office, a commission of two judges and a doctor declared Hord to be insane. He was subsequently sent to the Central Indiana Hospital for the Insane in Indianapolis.

Hord was elected judge of Indiana's Ninth Circuit Court in 1892 after "hundreds of citizens" signed a petition to put his name on the ballot for the election. He served on the bench until 1904.

In 1897, following the death of William S. Holman (a U.S. Representative from Indiana), Governor Isaac P. Gray nominated Hord to assume his seat in Congress. Hord declined the nomination, just as he had when offered Kerr's seat.

=== Personal life and death ===
Hord was a skilled public speaker and was called "the silver-tongued orator of the West."

Hord was a friend of Thomas A. Hendricks, Indiana Governor and U.S. Vice President under Grover Cleveland. In 1885, Hord traveled to Washington, D.C. as a personal guest of the Vice President.

Hord married Emma Banfield. Their son, William Banfield Hord, also became a lawyer, studying law with his father and becoming Deputy Indiana Attorney General from 1882 to 1887 (under his father and under Louis T. Michener). William B. was later hired as attorney and general counsel for a gasworks and waterworks corporation in Chicago and was then employed by a large banking-house in New York City to purchase the debt accrued by the U.S. Government to the Cherokee Nation following the government's purchase of the Cherokee Outlet.

Hord died in Indianapolis in 1912.

Political offices
Preceded by Daniel P. Baldwin	Indiana Attorney General; 1882–1886	Succeeded by Louis T. Michener
