= Manson =

Manson is a surname of Scottish origin. It is an Anglicised version of the Scandinavian name Magnusson, meaning son of Magnus, and a Sept of Clan Gunn. It is particularly common in the far northeast of Scotland in the county of Caithness and in Orkney and Shetland. It is also relatively common in southwest Scotland, in the country of Ayrshire.

Notable people with the surname include:

- Alan Manson (1919–2002), American actor
- Amy Manson (born 1985), Scottish actor
- Andra Manson (born 1984), American high jumper
- Andy Manson, British luthier and custom guitar-maker
- Britney Manson (born 1995), Russian-Estonian model and influencer
- Bruce Manson (born 1956), American tennis player
- Bruce Manson (cricketer) (1878–1914), English cricketer
- Charles Manson (1934–2017), adopted surname of cult leader from the United States
- Charlotte Manson (1917–1996), American actress
- Charly Manson (born 1975), Mexican professional wrestler
- Dave Manson (born 1967), Canadian ice hockey player
- David Manson (militiaman) (1753–1836), American Revolutionary War aide to General George Washington
- David Manson (producer) (born 1952), American film and television producer, screenwriter, and director
- David Ames Manson (1841–1929), merchant and political figure in Quebec
- Grace Manson (1893–1967), American psychologist
- Héléna Manson (1898–1994), French film actress
- James Manson (Australian footballer) (born 1966), Australian rules footballer
- Jeane Manson (born 1950), American model, singer, and actress
- Jim Manson (Australian footballer) (died 2010), Australia footballer and father of James Manson
- Josh Manson (born 1991), American ice hockey player
- Mahlon Dickerson Manson (1820–1895), American military officer, Union General during the Civil War
- Marilyn Manson (born 1969), stage name of Brian Hugh Warner, American musician and artist
  - Marilyn Manson (band), the band of the same name
- Mark Manson (born 1984), American self-help writer and blogger
- Michael Manson (politician) (1857–1932), Scottish-born farmer and political figure in British Columbia, Canada
- Michael Manson (judge), judge of the Federal Court of Canada
- Pat Manson (born 1967), American pole vaulter
- Patrick Manson (1844–1922), Scottish physician, pioneer in the field of tropical medicine
- Robert Manson (1866 or 1867–1932), Canadian politician
- Shirley Manson (born 1966), Scottish musician and actress
- Stephen Manson (born 1986), Scottish footballer
- Thomas Walter Manson (1893–1958), English biblical scholar
- William Manson (1867–1953), Scottish-born accountant, notary public, and MLA for Alberni and Skeena in British Columbia, Canada
- William Manson (theologian) (1882–1958), British theologian
- William J. Manson (1872–1948), Scottish-born magistrate and MLA for Dewdney in British Columbia, Canada

== Fictional characters ==
- Samantha Manson, one of the main characters of Danny Phantom

== See also ==
- Mansun
