= Louis T. Michener =

American lawyer and politician (1848–1928)

14th Indiana Attorney General
- In office November 22, 1886 – November 22, 1890
- Governor: Isaac P. Gray, Alvin P. Hovey
- Preceded by: Francis T. Hord
- Succeeded by: Alonzo G. Smith

Personal details
- Born: December 21, 1848 Connersville, Indiana, US
- Died: February 10, 1928 (aged 79) Washington, D.C., US

Louis Theodore Michener (December 21, 1848 – February 10, 1928) was an American lawyer and politician who served as the fourteenth Indiana Attorney General from November 22, 1886, to November 22, 1890. Michener also served on the staff of President Benjamin Harrison as both a campaign manager and political adviser.

== Biography ==
=== Early life and education ===
Michener was born in Connersville, Indiana to William and Mary A. (née Blake) Michener. William Michener, a native of Ohio who came to Indiana as a child, was descended from a Quaker family from Washington County, Pennsylvania. Mary Michener was a native of Virginia and also came to Indiana with her family at a young age.

Michener attended common schools in Fayette County and was a student at Brookville College for a year. In 1870, he began to read law with James C. McIntosh in Connersville. He was admitted to the bar in 1871 and opened a practice in Brookville.

=== Political career ===
In 1871, Michener, a Republican, was appointed deputy district attorney of Franklin County. He held this office for two years.

In 1873, Michener moved to Winfield, Kansas, before returning to Indiana one year later, settling in Shelbyville. In Shelbyville, he continued to practice law in partnership with his father-in-law, Thomas B. Adams. Michener left the firm in 1886.

In 1886, Michener was elected Indiana Attorney General, succeeding Francis T. Hord. He served in the administrations of Governors Isaac P. Gray (a Democrat) and Alvin P. Hovey (a Republican). Michener served two full terms as Attorney General and was succeeded to the office by Alonzo G. Smith. From 1886 to 1887, the Deputy Attorney General under Michener was William B. Hord, son of Michener's predecessor, Francis T. Hord.

In addition to his duties as Attorney General, Michener served as chairman of the Indiana Republican Party Committee from 1888 to 1890, as a delegate to the 1884 Republican National Convention in Chicago, and also as campaign manager to Benjamin Harrison (U.S. Senator from Indiana) during the 1888 presidential election. Michener would also serve as campaign manager for Harrison in the 1892 election. Michener convinced Stephen B. Elkins (the man Harrison would later appoint as Secretary of War) to back Harrison in the 1888 Republican primaries, part of a larger bid to convince supporters of James G. Blaine to support Harrison over other Republican candidates. Following Harrison's election to the presidency, Michener joined the president's staff as a political adviser.

Michener was also an early supporter of Theodore Roosevelt. Michener, along with Henry Cabot Lodge and presidential secretary Elijah W. Halford, successfully convinced President Harrison to appoint Roosevelt to the United States Civil Service Commission in 1889. In 1904, Michener wrote a letter to James S. Clarkson promoting the Republican ticket of Theodore Roosevelt and Charles W. Fairbanks in the 1904 presidential election, stating that opposition to Roosevelt and Fairbanks came primarily from Southern Democrats who wished to preserve Jim Crow laws that disenfranchised African Americans.

=== Personal life and death ===
Michener was a friend and political ally of Richard W. Thompson, a U.S. Representative from Indiana and Secretary of the Navy.

In 1872, Michener married Mary E. Adams, daughter of his law partner, Thomas B. Adams. Mary Adams was a native of Franklin County and moved with her husband to Washington, D.C. where she died in 1935. They had one child, Nora, who married a D.C. lawyer.

Michener died at his home in Washington on February 10, 1928.

Political offices
Preceded by Francis T. Hord	Indiana Attorney General; 1886-1890	Succeeded by Alonzo G. Smith
