= 1884 Indiana gubernatorial election =

- November 4, 1884
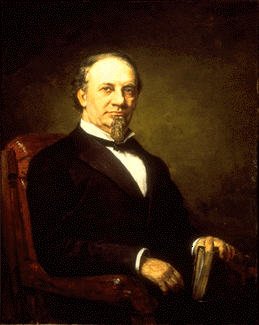

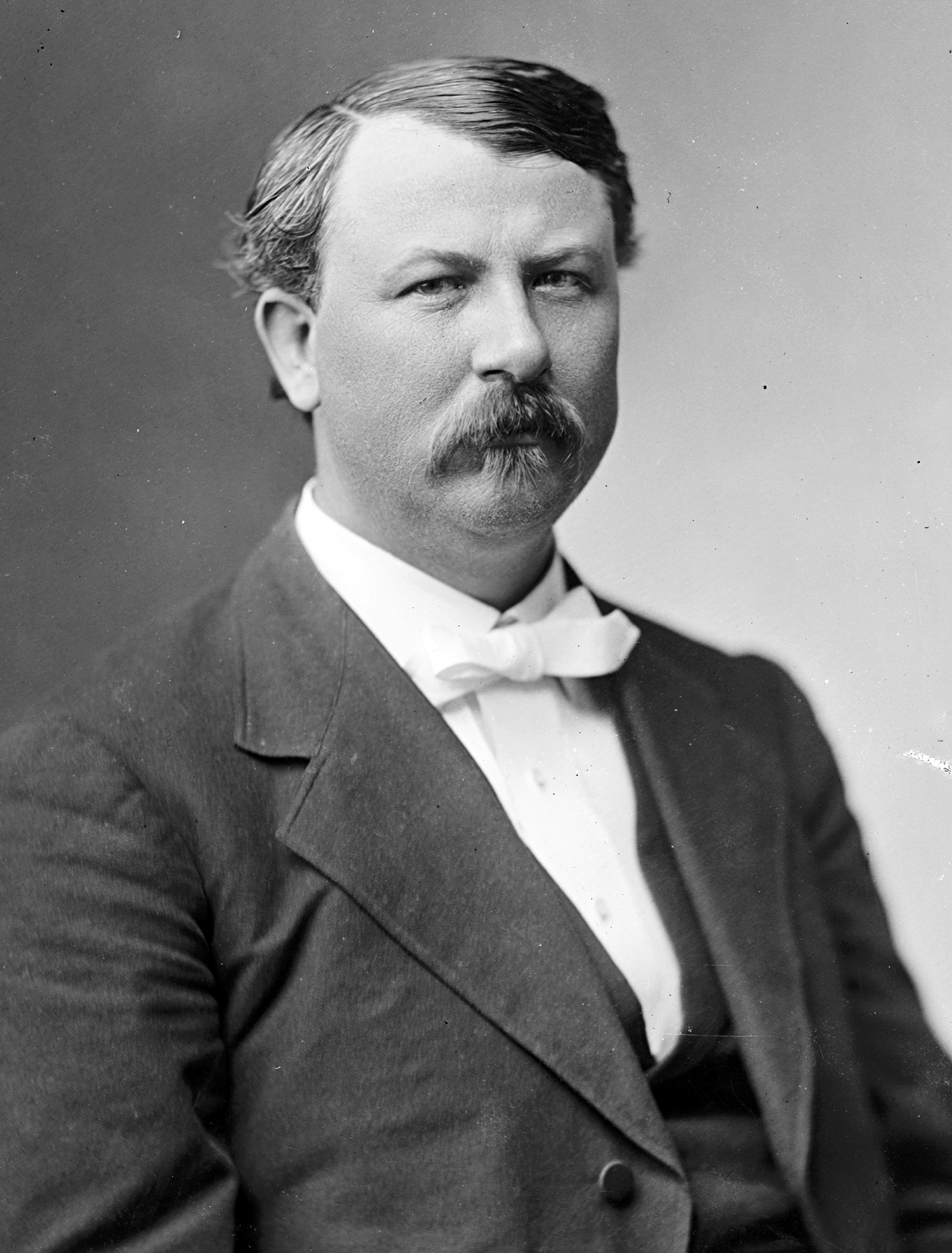
Nominee	Isaac P. Gray	William H. Calkins
Party	Democratic	Republican
Popular vote	245,130	237,748
Percentage	49.51%	48.02%
- County results Gray: 40–50% 50–60% 60–70% 70–80% Calkins: 40–50% 50–60% 60–70%
Governor before election
Albert G. Porter
Republican
Elected Governor
Isaac P. Gray
Democratic

The 1884 Indiana gubernatorial election was held on November 4, 1884. Democratic former Governor Isaac P. Gray defeated Republican nominee William H. Calkins with 49.51% of the vote.

== General election ==
=== Candidates ===
Major party candidates

- William H. Calkins, Republican, United States Representative from Indiana's 13th congressional district
- Isaac P. Gray, Democrat, incumbent lieutenant governor of Indiana

Other candidates

- Robert S. Dwiggins, Prohibition
- Hiram Z. Leonard, Greenback

=== Results ===
1884 Indiana gubernatorial election
Party	Candidate	Votes	%	±%
Democratic	Isaac P. Gray	245,130	49.51%	
Republican	William H. Calkins	237,748	48.02%	
Greenback	Hiram Z. Leonard	8,338	1.68%	
Prohibition	Robert S. Dwiggins	3,868	0.78%	
Majority		7,382		
Turnout				
Democratic hold		Swing		
