= Alonzo G. Smith =

American politician

15th Attorney General of Indiana
- In office 1890–1894
- Governor: Isaac P. Gray
- Preceded by: Louis T. Michener
- Succeeded by: William A. Ketcham

Lieutenant Governor of Indiana
- In office November 8, 1886 – January 14, 1889
- Governor: Isaac P. Gray
- Preceded by: Robert S. Robertson
- Succeeded by: Ira Joy Chase

Personal details
- Born: September 6, 1848 Meigs County, Ohio, U.S.
- Died: August 6, 1907 (aged 58) Indianapolis, Indiana, U.S.
- Party: Democratic

Alonzo Greene Smith (6 September 1848 – 6 August 1907) was a politician from the U.S. state of Indiana. Between 1886 and 1889 he served as acting Lieutenant Governor of Indiana.

== Life ==
Alonzo Smith was born in Meigs County in Ohio. There is not much information available about his youth. He completed the majority of his education at common schools in addition to supplemental courses at Franklin College. In 1867, Smith moved to North Vernon, Indiana, and began practicing law. He joined the Democratic Party and was elected to the Indiana Senate, where he became the President Pro Tempore. In 1886 and 1887 there was a political dispute in Indiana between the Democratic and the Republican Party. It started when Governor Isaac P. Gray announced that he wanted to be elected to the United States Senate by the Indiana General Assembly. This led to the so-called Black Day of the Indiana General Assembly on 24 February 1887. The Democratic controlled State Senate refused to seat the newly elected Lieutenant Governor Robert S. Robertson (Republican) ignoring a decision of the Supreme Court of Indiana. When Robertson entered the Senate chamber, a group of Democratic Senators attacked him. This led to a fight between Democratic and Republican State Senators. Shortly afterwards the fight continued in the Indiana House of Representatives. Democratic and Republican State Representatives and State Senators continued to attack each other. After about four hours strong police forces were able to reestablish order in the building. The result of this was that Governor Gray gave up his plan to run for the United States Senate and Robertson was still not seated as Lieutenant Governor. At that point the President pro tempore of the State Senate, Alonzo Smith, who was already acting Lieutenant Governor since 8 November 1886 when he replaced Mahlon Dickerson Manson who had retired, was permanently assigned to this office. He served in this position until 14 January 1889 when the term ended. Between 1890 and 1894 Smith was the State attorney general of Indiana. He died on 6 August 1907 in Indianapolis.

== Literature ==
- American Bar Association: Annual Report: Including Proceedings of the Annual Meeting, : Volume 31, E.C. Markley & Son, Philadelphia, 1907, P. 771.
- Los Angeles Herald. : Volume 34, Number 309, Herald Pub. Co., Los Angeles, Calif., 6. August 1907, P. 2.
- Law Notes. : Volume 11, E. Thompson Co., Northport, N.Y., 1908, P. 115.

Political offices
Preceded by Mahlon Dickerson Manson	Lieutenant Governor of Indiana; 1886–1889	Succeeded by Ira Joy Chase
Preceded by Louis T. Michener	Indiana Attorney General; 1890-1894	Succeeded by William A. Ketcham
