= John Hanna (Indiana politician) =

American politician and lawyer (1827–1882)

Member of the U.S. House of Representatives from Indiana's 7th district
- In office March 4, 1877 – March 3, 1879
- Preceded by: Franklin Landers
- Succeeded by: Gilbert De La Matyr

Personal details
- Born: November 3, 1827 Indianapolis, Indiana, U.S.
- Died: October 24, 1882 (aged 54) Plainfield, Illinois, U.S.
- Resting place: Forest Hill Cemetery; Greencastle, Indiana, U.S.
- Party: Republican
- Education: Indiana Asbury University
- Occupation: Politician; lawyer

John Hanna (September 3, 1827 – October 24, 1882) was a United States representative (1877 to 1879) and U.S. attorney (1861 to 1866) from Indiana.

== Early years ==
John Hanna was born on September 3, 1827, near Indianapolis. He pursued classical studies and graduated from the Indiana Asbury University (now DePauw University) in 1850. He studied law, was admitted to the bar.

== Career ==
Hanna commenced practice in Greencastle. He was mayor of Greencastle from 1851 to 1854.

=== Bleeding Kansas ===
He moved to Kansas in 1857 and in December of that year was elected to its Territorial legislature. He served from 1857 to 1858. In 1858, as Chairman of the Judiciary Committee, he introduced and secured passage (over the Governor's veto) of an act that repealed the 1855 law "To punish offenses against slave property", effectively making expansion of slavery in Kansas impossible. He returned to Indiana in 1858.

=== U.S. Attorney ===
In 1860, he was an Indiana elector for Abraham Lincoln. He was appointed United States Attorney for Indiana by President Lincoln in 1861. Active in pursuing disloyalty claims against Southern sympathizers, he appeared for the United States in Ex Parte Milligan prior to the appeal to the U. S. Supreme Court. Reappointed by President Andrew Johnson in 1865, he was removed by him in 1866 after he publicly denounced the president at a meeting in Indianapolis. He then retired to private law practice in partnership with civil war general Frederick Knefler.

=== Congressman ===
He was elected as a Republican to the 45th Congress in 1876, defeating the Democratic incumbent 19,534 to 18,236, as the Greenback party candidate polled 1,595 votes. He held office from March 4, 1877, to March 3, 1879, having been defeated in his bid for reelection in 1878 by Gilbert De La Matyr, who had been nominated by both the Democratic and Greenback parties, 18,727 to 17,881.

== Personal life ==
Hanna died on October 24, 1882, in Plainfield, Indiana. He was interred at Forest Hill Cemetery in Greencastle.

U.S. House of Representatives
Preceded by Franklin Landers	Member of the U.S. House of Representatives from Indiana's 7th congressional district March 4, 1877 – March 3, 1879	Succeeded by Gilbert De La Matyr
