= 1880 Indiana gubernatorial election =

- October 12, 1880
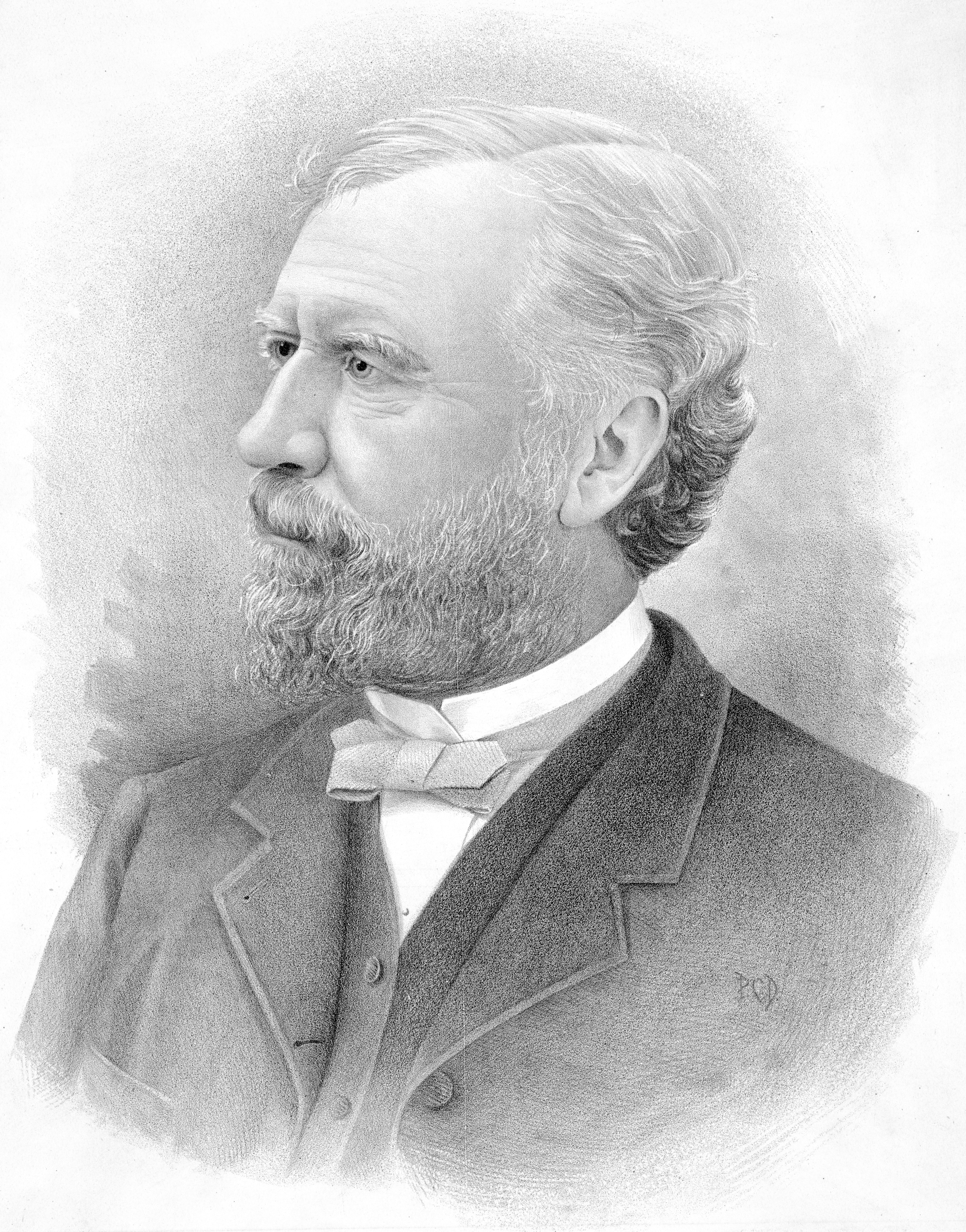

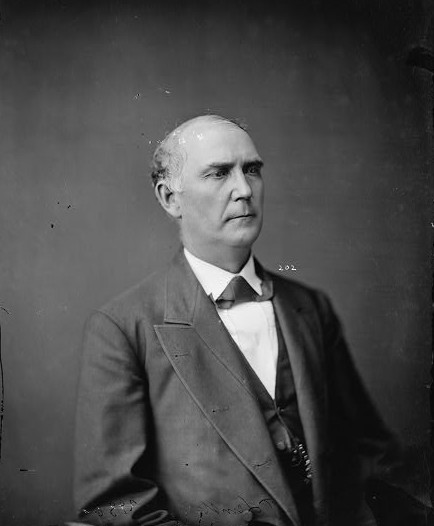
| Nominee | Albert G. Porter | Franklin Landers |
| Party | Republican | Democratic |
| Popular vote | 231,405 | 224,452 |
| Percentage | 49.16% | 47.68% |
- County results Porter: 40–50% 50–60% 60–70% Landers: 40–50% 50–60% 60–70% 70–80%
Governor before election
James D. Williams
Democratic
Elected Governor
Albert G. Porter
Republican

The 1880 Indiana gubernatorial election was held on October 12, 1880. Republican nominee Albert G. Porter defeated Democratic nominee Franklin Landers with 49.16% of the vote.

== General election ==
=== Candidates ===
Major party candidates

- Albert G. Porter, Republican, Comptroller of the Treasury under President Rutherford Hayes
- Franklin Landers, Democratic, former U.S. Representative from Indiana's 7th congressional district

Other candidates

- Robert Gregg, Greenback

=== Results ===
1880 Indiana gubernatorial election
| Party | Candidate | Votes | % | ±% |
|---|---|---|---|---|
| Republican | Albert G. Porter | 231,405 | 49.16% | |
| Democratic | Franklin Landers | 224,452 | 47.68% | |
| Greenback | Robert Gregg | 14,881 | 3.16% | |
| Majority | | 6,953 | | |
| Turnout | | | | |
| Republican gain from Democratic | | Swing | | |
