= Robert S. Robertson =

American Civil War Medal of Honor recipient

Robert Stoddart Robertson
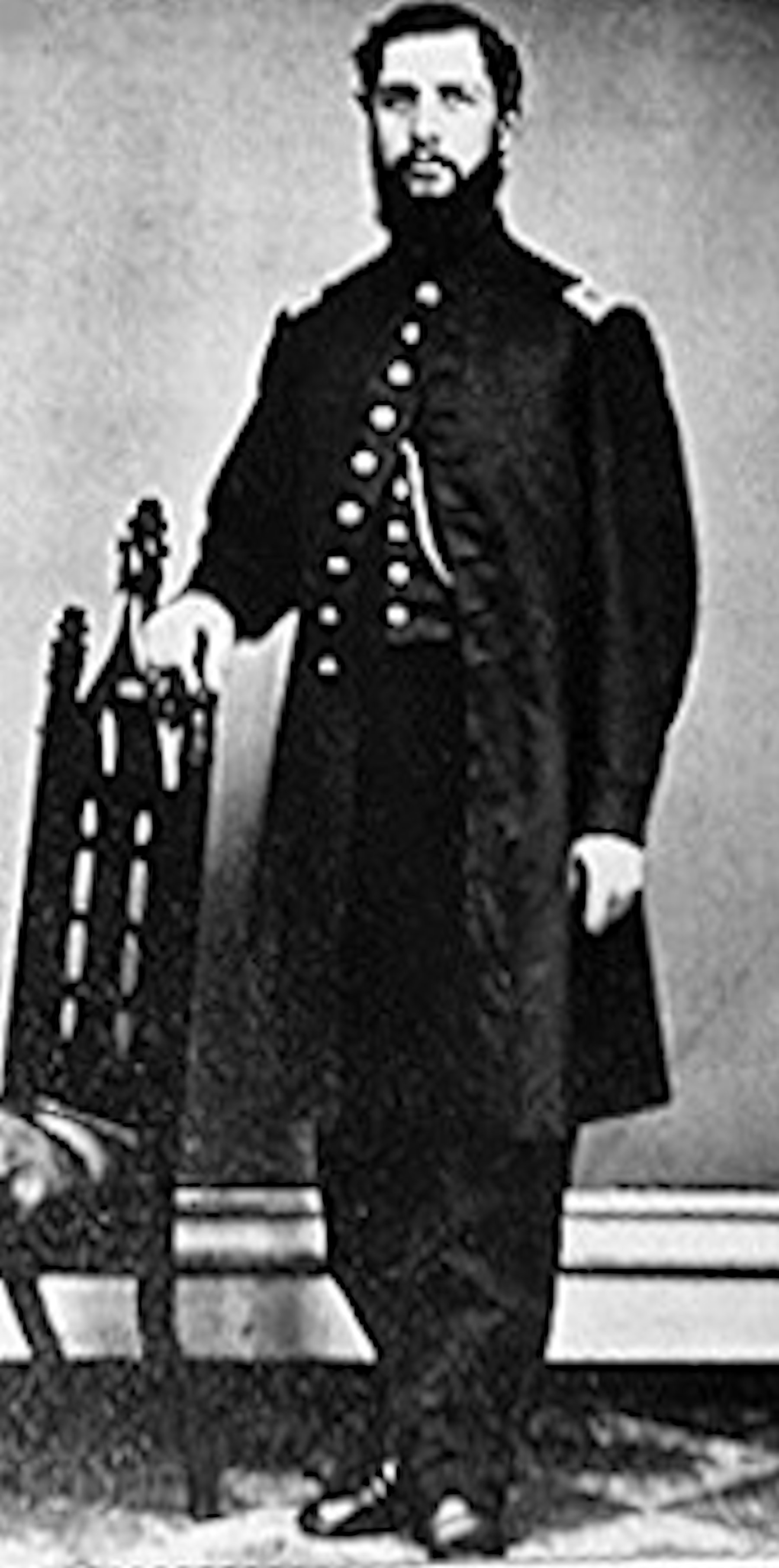

21st Lieutenant Governor of Indiana
- In office January 10, 1887 – January 13, 1889
- Governor: Isaac P. Gray
- Preceded by: Mahlon D. Manson
- Succeeded by: Alonzo G. Smith (acting)

Personal details
- Born: April 16, 1839 Argyle, New York, US
- Died: August 24, 1906 (aged 67) Fort Wayne, Indiana, US
- Party: Republican
- Awards: Medal of Honor

Military service
- Allegiance: United States of America
- Branch/service: United States Army
- Rank: Brevet Captain
- Unit: (New York (state)) Company K, 93rd New York Volunteer Infantry
- Battles/wars: American Civil War; Battle at Corbins Bridge (MOH)

Robert Stoddart Robertson (April 16, 1839 – August 24, 1906) was a United States Army soldier who received the Medal of Honor for his actions during the American Civil War, while serving with Company K, 93rd New York Volunteer Infantry. He later served as Lieutenant Governor of Indiana.

U.S. Medal of Honor version given from 1862 to 1895

== Early life ==
Robert Stoddart Robertson was born on April 16, 1839, in North Argyle, New York, to Nicholas and Martha Robertson, who were also the parents of two daughters — Margaret and Anne. The couple belonged to the Presbyterian colony planted in that region of New York about 1764 by Captain Duncan Cameron, under the patronage of George Douglas Campbell, Duke of Argyle. Robert received his elementary education in the Argyle common schools, where his teachers marked him as more studious than most boys. Later he attended Argyle Academy, becoming an omnivorous reader of the best literature that lay within his reach. Though he enjoyed the usual sports and recreations of village boys, his father taught him cabinetmaking, which he found useful in later life. Until 1859 he worked during vacations in his father's sawmill and gristmill. Robert liked to observe his father when he presided as justice of the peace. He early chose the law as his life profession and became a student in the office of James Gibson in Salem, New York, in 1859. In November, 1860, he was admitted to the New York bar. Subsequently, he went to Whitehall, New York, to begin active practice. While practicing law there before the war, Robert met Elizabeth Harrington Miller, eldest daughter of John A. and Catherine Miller of Fort Edward. The Civil War caused them to postpone their marriage plans until after the war ended. On July 19, 1865, they were married in Whitehall.

== Battle report ==
While on staff duty First Lieutenant Robertson participated in the action at Corbin's Creek. Thirty-three years thereafter on July 26, 1897, R. A. Alger, Secretary of War under President McKinley, informed Robertson that the Congressional Medal of Honor was presented him for most distinguished gallantry in action.

Robertson later described the action, in his memoirs published in 1958, as follows:

The engagement at Corbin's Creek in May, 1864, was preliminary to the Battle of Spotsylvania. By a rapid march early on May 8, the Second Army Corps gained the road. We reached Todd's Tavern when Lee's men made an attempt to cut our column in two. Our brigade was pushed through the hot pine woods to a valley through which runs Corbin's Creek. We halted for a time, and a picket line was posted to guard the approaches. Hardly had it been posted . . . before it was thought necessary to extend the line further to our right to cover a byroad there. The duty fell to us. I was riding down the road to an opening in the bushes . . . when I found the line of battle moving toward me and our position. There was no escape except through the gap. They were rapidly approaching; no time was to be lost, for if they reached the opening before me, my march would end in Richmond as a prisoner of war.

They evidently believed I was coming to surrender, for they invited me to join them in polite terms, which were, "Come in, you damned YankI We'll take good care of you." But the opening was reached, and I showed my horse's tail and his speed as we galloped up the hill. Scattering volleys were fired, but the rebels were excited and shot wildly. My horse leaped a rail fence at the top of the hill; the saddle girth had come loose, the saddle turned, and I fell. To mount again was only the work of a moment, for the dread of a rebel prison almost gives one wings. The volleys meant for me had roused the brigade, which greeted me with hearty cheers as I rode into line with my saddle under my horse instead of under me. The attacking columns appeared but halted to make proper disposition for the attack, and we were ordered to a better position a little in the rear. Shortly afterwards another rebel brigade was discovered at our right flank. We had to prepare for an attack there and to the front. Reinforcements were sent for. The brigade in front moved up the slope. Gallant Colonel McKeen of the Thirty-first Pennsylvania had charge of that part of the line and spoke words of encouragement to his men, many of whom were raw recruits and had never been under fire before.

The ki-yi-yi of the Confederates was not answered until they were close upon us. Then a volley answered their yells sending many to their long home, but they closed ranks and marched down the hill. Now commenced hot work on the right. Here were the Sixty-first New York and the One Hundred and Fortieth Pennsylvania under General Miles in person. The Confederates charged and nearly drove in our center, which broke and drifted to the rear. The staff tried to drive and coax the frightened men. I at once seized the colors from the frightened guard and rode with them in the face of the enemy to their former place. This checked the panic and inspired the men. The regiment rallied on its colors. The line was saved, our little brigade was proud, we had whipped two brigades of Mahon's division before any reinforcements reached us, and we were received with hearty cheers as we filled the trenches. We had lost nearly two hundred men and were obliged to leave our dead upon the field.

== Post War ==
After the Civil War, Robertson became a companion of the Indiana Commandery of the Military Order of the Loyal Legion of the United States.

Subsequently, he served as a lawyer in Washington D.C. then moved to Fort Wayne, Indiana where he was elected Lieutenant Governor as a Republican in November 1886. Robertson was unable to fulfill his duties as Lieutenant Governor as a political crisis between the Democratic controlled Senate and Republican controlled House created a stalemate which lasted throughout Robertson's period as Lieutenant Governor.

He is buried in the Lindenwood Cemetery in Fort Wayne, Indiana.

== Medal of Honor citation ==
"The President of the United States of America, in the name of Congress, takes pleasure in presenting the Medal of Honor to First Lieutenant Robert Stoddart Robertson, United States Army, for extraordinary heroism on 8 May 1864, while serving with Company K, 93d New York Infantry, in action at Corbins Bridge, Virginia. While acting as aide-de-camp to a general officer, seeing a regiment break to the rear, First Lieutenant Robertson seized its colors, rode with them to the front in the face of the advancing enemy, and rallied the retreating regiment."

== See also ==
- List of American Civil War Medal of Honor recipients
