= Thomas J. Cason =

American politician

Thomas Cason
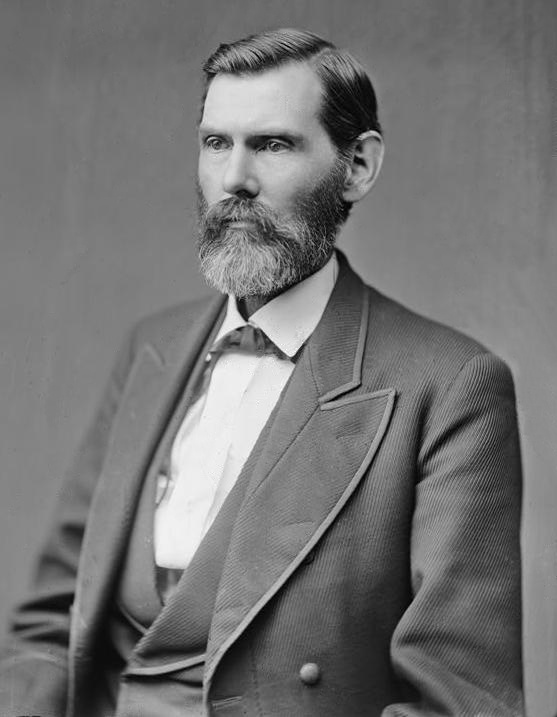

Member of the U.S. House of Representatives from Indiana's 7th district
- In office March 4, 1873 – March 3, 1875
- Preceded by: Mahlon D. Manson
- Succeeded by: Franklin Landers

Member of the Indiana Senate
- In office 1864–1867

Member of the Indiana House of Representatives from the ? district
- In office 1861–1864

Personal details
- Born: September 13, 1828 Brownsville, Indiana, U.S.
- Died: July 10, 1901 (aged 72) Washington, D.C., U.S
- Resting place: Oak Hill Cemetery
- Party: Republican

Thomas Jefferson Cason (September 13, 1828 – July 10, 1901) was an American lawyer and politician who served two terms as a U.S. representative from Indiana from 1873 to 1877.

== Early life and career ==
Born near Brownsville, Indiana, Cason moved to Boone County with his parents, who settled on a farm near Thorntown in 1832. He attended the common schools, and taught school in Boone County for several years. He studied law in Crawfordsville, Indiana to gain admission to the bar in 1850, commencing practice in Lebanon, Indiana.

=== Early political career ===
He served as member of the Indiana House of Representatives from 1861 to 1864, and of the Indiana State Senate from 1864 to 1867. In April 1867, Governor Conrad Baker appointed Cason to be a common pleas judge of Boone County, to which office he was subsequently elected in October 1867 for a term of four years. He declined reelection in 1871, and resumed the practice of law.

== Congress ==
Cason was elected as a Republican to the Forty-third and Forty-fourth Congresses (March 4, 1873 – March 3, 1877). He was an unsuccessful candidate for renomination in 1876.

== Later career and death ==
After leaving office, he resumed the practice of law in Lebanon, Indiana.

He retired in 1897 and moved to Washington, D.C., where he died July 10, 1901. He was interred in Oak Hill Cemetery, Lebanon, Indiana.

U.S. House of Representatives
Preceded by Mahlon D. Manson	Member of the U.S. House of Representatives from Indiana's 7th congressional district March 4, 1873 – March 3, 1875	Succeeded by Franklin Landers
Preceded by John P. C. Shanks	Member of the U.S. House of Representatives from Indiana's 9th congressional district March 4, 1875 – March 3, 1877	Succeeded by Michael D. White
