= Lucien Barbour =

American politician (1811–1880)

Member of the U.S. House of Representatives from Indiana's 6th district
- In office March 4, 1855 – March 3, 1857
- Preceded by: Thomas A. Hendricks
- Succeeded by: James M. Gregg

Personal details
- Born: Lucien Barbour; March 4, 1811 Canton, Connecticut, U.S.
- Died: July 19, 1880 (aged 69) Crown Hill Cemetery and Arboretum, Indianapolis, Indiana, U.S.
- Resting place: Section 5, Lot 75
- Party: Indianan People's Party; Republican Party

Lucien Barbour (March 4, 1811 – July 19, 1880) was an American lawyer and politician who served one term as a U.S. representative from Indiana from 1855 to 1857.

== Biography ==
Born in Canton, Connecticut, Barbour was graduated from Amherst College in 1837. He moved to Indiana the same year and settled in Madison, Jefferson County. He studied law. He was admitted to the bar and commenced practice in Indianapolis, Indiana, in 1839. Barbour acted a number of times as arbitrator between the State of Indiana and private corporations. He was appointed United States district attorney for the district of Indiana by President Polk. He served as member of the commission to codify the laws of Indiana in 1852.

=== Congress ===
Barbour was elected as an Indiana People's Party candidate to the Thirty-fourth Congress (March 4, 1855 – March 3, 1857). He was not a candidate for renomination in 1856.

=== Later career and death ===
He was affiliated with the Republican Party in 1860. Barbour practiced law in Indianapolis, Indiana, until his death in that city on July 19, 1880. He was interred in Crown Hill Cemetery.

U.S. House of Representatives
Preceded by Thomas A. Hendricks	Member of the U.S. House of Representatives from Indiana's 6th congressional district 1855-1857	Succeeded by James M. Gregg
