= Gilbert De La Matyr =

American politician

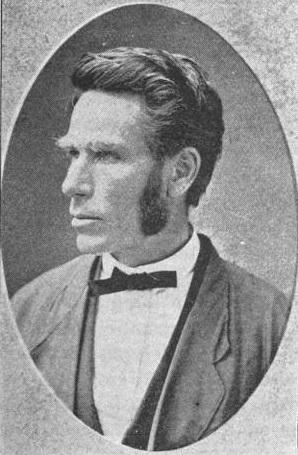

Member of the U.S. House of Representatives from Indiana's 7th district
- In office March 4, 1879 – March 3, 1881
- Preceded by: John Hanna
- Succeeded by: Stanton J. Peelle

Personal details
- Born: July 8, 1825 Pharsalia, New York
- Died: May 17, 1892 (aged 66) Akron, Ohio
- Party: Greenback

Gilbert De La Matyr (July 8, 1825 in Pharsalia, New York – May 17, 1892 in Akron, Ohio) was an American cleric and politician from New York and Indiana, serving one term in the U.S. House from 1879 to 1881.

== Life ==
He graduated from a theological course of the Methodist Episcopal Church in 1854 and became an itinerant elder. He served as member of the General Conference in 1868, and for one term was Presiding Elder.

=== Civil War ===
During the American Civil War, he helped enlist the 8th New York Heavy Artillery Regiment in 1862, and was its chaplain for three years.

=== Political career ===
In 1867 he ran on the Republican ticket for New York State Prison Inspector but was defeated by Democrat Solomon Scheu.

After holding pastorates in several large cities he settled in Indianapolis, Indiana, and continued his ministerial duties. Here, De La Matyr was elected as a National Greenback candidate to the 46th United States Congress and served from March 4, 1879, to March 3, 1881.

=== Later career and death ===
He moved to Denver, Colorado, in 1881 and again engaged in preaching. There, he became pastor of Evans Chapel in 1886 helped organized the construction of an expanded sanctuary named Grace Church. From 1889 on, he was Pastor of the First Methodist Episcopal Church of Akron, Ohio.

U.S. House of Representatives
Preceded by John Hanna	Member of the U.S. House of Representatives from Indiana's 7th congressional district March 4, 1879 – March 3, 1881	Succeeded by Stanton J. Peelle
