= John Stallo =

American lawyer

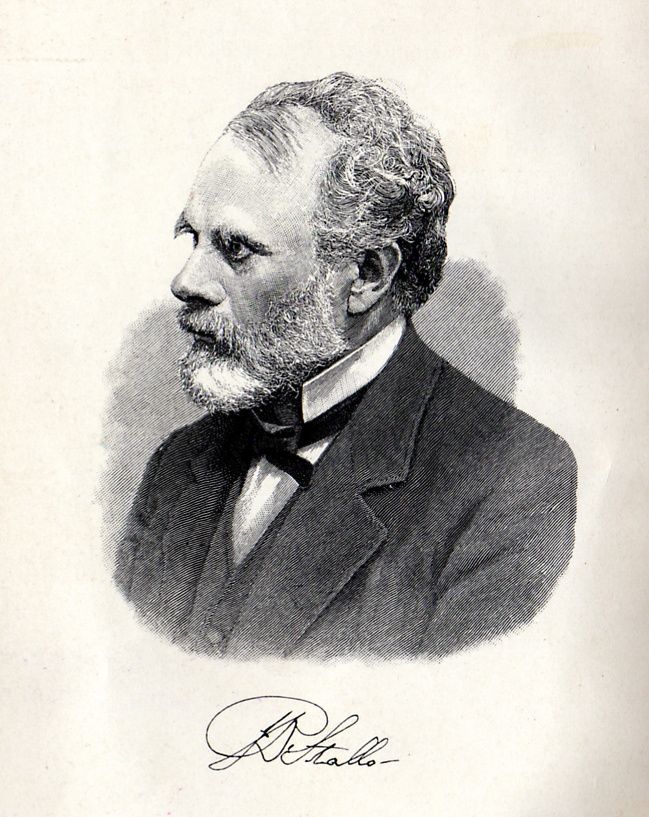
- Portrait of Stallo from the frontispiece of the German translation of "The Concepts of Modern Physics", J.A. Barth, Leipzig, 1911

3rd United States Minister to Italy
- In office November 27, 1885 – June 6, 1889
- President: Grover Cleveland; Benjamin Harrison
- Preceded by: William Waldorf Astor
- Succeeded by: Albert G. Porter

Personal details
- Born: Johann Bernhard Stallo; March 16, 1823 Sierhausen, Grand Duchy of Oldenburg
- Died: January 6, 1900 (aged 76) Florence, Italy
- Party: Liberal Republican
- Spouse: Helena Zimmerman (m. 1850)
- Children: 10
- Parent(s): Johann Heinrich Stallo; Anna Maria Adelheid Moormann

John (Johann) Bernhard Stallo (March 16, 1823 – January 6, 1900) was a German-American academic, jurist, philosopher, and ambassador.

== Early life ==
Stallo was born in Sierhausen in the Grand Duchy of Oldenburg (Germany) on March 16, 1823, the son of a schoolmaster, Johann Heinrich Stallo (1797–1840) and his wife, Anna Maria Adelheid Moormann (1798–1861). Stallo studied at home and at a free, Catholic normal school at Vechta. Because the family lacked the funds to send him to a gymnasium (secondary school), Stallo emigrated to the United States in 1839, establishing himself in Cincinnati, Ohio, not far from his uncle, the utopian socialist, Franz Joseph Stallo,, where many other family members would settle.

== Career ==
Stallo taught German and mathematics at the newly renamed St. Xavier College (formerly a Jesuit "lyceum" called "The Atheneum") from 1841 to 1844. He published his first book, ABC, Spelling and Reading Book, for the German Schools of America, which apparently sold very well. He then taught mathematics and science at another Jesuit institution, St. John's College (founded in 1841, now Fordham University and not to be confused with St. John's University, New York, founded in 1870) in Fordham, New York from 1844 to 1848. At St. John's, Stallo wrote his first major work, General Principles of the Philosophy of Nature (1848). This book, which he later dismissed as 'youthful', was apparently a restatement of Hegel's philosophy of nature. In 1881, he was elected as a member to the American Philosophical Society.

=== Politics and law ===
Stallo returned to Cincinnati and was there admitted to the bar in 1849, practicing law (in the firm of Stallo and Kittridge) except for a brief stint as judge of the Hamilton County Court of Common Pleas (in Ohio, a "trial court of general jurisdiction", according to Black's Law Dictionary) (1852–1855). He was active in politics and was later known as one of the "Ohio Hegelians", who included August Willich, Moncure Daniel Conway and Peter Kaufmann.

A Democrat for many years, Stallo broke with this party over slavery, and supported Abraham Lincoln and the new Republican Party during the American Civil War. He helped organize the "Stallo Regiment" from the German-American community. Stallo's becoming a Republican was all the more surprising because few Catholics did so in the 1850s. Stallo however was a fairly Liberal Catholic and at times has been described as a free thinker. He represented the trustees of Holy Trinity Church in their struggle to maintain control of the Church against the attempt by the Archbishop of Cincinnati to establish the Roman Catholic Canon law method of having all diocese properties held by the bishop.

=== The Cincinnati Bible War ===
Stallo argued a famous and successful case favoring separation of church and state in the Ohio public schools. In late 1869, a newly elected Cincinnati School Board decided to ban hymn-singing and Bible reading in the city's public schools. A conservative group brought suit against the Board to block the ban. Stallo, among with George Hoadly (later governor of Ohio) and Stanley Matthews (later an associate justice of the U.S. Supreme Court), served as the school board's counsel. Stallo closed his argument by saying,

The spires will point to the heaven, the unmuffled church bells will speak of God, as before; the 'free Bible' will have free sway, but in a free State, in free churches or religious schools, by the side of free secular schools. And I hope my friend will not regard it as a calamity if the son of a Presbyterian or Methodist, after his intercourse with the child of a Jew, Catholic, or unbeliever, should turn to the Scriptures with the feeling that the truth is broader than the leaves of any book…"

The Board nevertheless lost in a two-to-one vote of the Superior Court and was enjoined from enforcing its vote on Bible reading. Stallo's arguments on appeal to the Ohio Supreme Course led to a unanimous reversal of the lower court and reinstatement of the ban on Bible-reading in 1872.

=== Later political life ===
Stallo took part in the Liberal Republican movement of 1872. He was rewarded for his support of the Democratic candidate, Grover Cleveland, in 1884, by appointment as Ambassador (`Envoy Extraordinary and Minister Plenipotentiary') to Italy (1885–1889). According to Andrew Dickson White (Autobiography), Stallo was an exemplary diplomat:

'I was most pleased with the tribute ...[ Ubaldino Peruzzi ].. paid to the American minister at Rome, Judge Stallo of Cincinnati. He declared that at a recent conference of statesmen and diplomatists, Judge Stallo had carried off all the honors—speaking with ease, as might be necessary, in Italian, French, and English, and finally drawing up a protocol in Latin.'

After Cleveland lost his first re-election campaign to Benjamin Harrison in 1888, Stallo retired to Florence, Italy and there assembled a collection of his essays written in German, Reden, Abhandlungen und Briefe.

=== The Concepts and Theories of Modern Physics ===
During the post-war period Stallo wrote his most famous work, The Concepts and Theories of Modern Physics, first published in 1882. The Concepts deals with the role of 'concepts' in physical theory, arguing that they must be treated as provisional and warning of the mental traps of mistaking concepts for facts; this book represents an early example of the modern philosophy of science. It went through three American editions in Stallo's lifetime, which were simultaneously published in England. A French translation was issued in 1884, with a foreword by Charles Friedel Among many others, the second edition was read by Bertrand Russell, who awarded it three footnotes in his An Essay on the Foundations of Geometry (1897). Russell's footnotes brought Stallo to the attention of the German physicist Ernst Mach, who saw in Stallo a kindred philosophical and scientific spirit. Mach initiated a correspondence with Stallo, cut short by the latter's death, whereupon Mach arranged for a German translation by Hans Kleinpeter, to which Mach contributed a foreword. Die Begriffe und Theorien der Modernen Physik was published in 1901 (Barth, Leipzig) and re-issued in 1911 with a short new foreword by Kleinpeter. This translation introduced Stallo to a German audience and helped establish The Concepts as an important contribution to the philosophy of physics. A modern American edition, based on the 1888 edition, was edited by the American physicist and father of "operationalism", Percy Williams Bridgman (Belknap Press, Harvard University Press, 1960).

In Ch XIV, "Metageometrical Space in the Light of Modern Analysis Riemann's Essay," Stallo flamingly critiques Riemann's "On the Hypotheses which lie at the Base of Geometry," ending with the statement that "the analytical argument in favor of the existence, or possibility, of transcendental space is another flagrant instance of the reification of concepts."

== Personal life ==
In 1850, Stallo was married to Helena Zimmerman (1825–1905) of Cincinnati, with whom he had ten children, five of them surviving childhood, including:

- Walter Stallo (1851–1880)
- Linda Stallo (1855–1889), who married attorney Conrad Ludwig Hotze (1839–1913) in 1882.
- Hulda Stallo (1857–1931)
- Helena Stallo (1861–1891)
- Edmund Kittredge Stallo (1864–1947), who married Laura McDonald (1870–1895) in 1889. After her death in 1895 he married Carrie May Harrington (1866–1921) in 1903. They divorced in 1912 and in 1919 he married Clarissa Aurilla Wilcox (1877–1969). They divorced in 1938.

Stallo died in Florence on January 6, 1900.

=== Descendants ===
Through his son Edmund, he was a grandfather of Helena, Princess Murat (née Helena McDonald Stallo) who married Prince Murat on 6 February 1913. and Laura, Princess Rospigliosi (née Laura McDonald Stallo), who married Prince Rospigliosi on 30 June 1914.

== Works ==
- General Principles of the Philosophy of Nature, with an Outline of Some of Its Recent Developments Among the Germans, Embracing the Philosophical Systems of Schelling and Hegel, and Oken's System of Nature. Boston: W. Crosby and H.P. Nichols, 1848. "General Principles" was received with great interest by the New England Transcendentalists, in particular Ralph Waldo Emerson, who referred to Stallo's book in his journals. Of interest was Stallo's argument that thought was fundamentally identical with the universe. The book was reviewed in the Massachusetts Quarterly by Theodore Parker, who called it "a grand solid book".
- Reply to Prof. O.A. Brownson's lecture on non-intervention, before the Mercantile Library Association of Cincinnati. A lecture delivered in Smith & Nixon's Hall, Cincinnati, February 20, 1852 Cincinnati, Pub. for the Committee, by C.A. Morgan & Co., 1852. Refers to Orestes Augustus Brownson (1803–1876) on the uprising in Hungary in (1848–1849).
- Thomas Jefferson Cincinnati, O. : Gedruckt in der Offizin des "Pionier", 1855.
- Alexander von Humboldt : eine Gedächtnissrede Cincinnati : Theobald und Theurkauf, 1859.
- Minor, John D., and others. The Bible in the public schools, pp. 420. Clarke : Cincinnati, 1870. Contains the opinions and decisions of the superior court of Cincinnati, with the arguments of George Hoadley, Rufus King, Stanley Matthews, George R. Sage, William M. Ramsey, and J. B. Stallo. Cited by Monroe Bibliography of Education
- The secularization of public education. Cincinnati: R. Clarke, 1870 Cited in Will Seymour Monroe Bibliography of Education, p. 134.
- State Creeds and Their Modern Apostles. A Lecture Delivered in Rev. Mr. Vickers' Church, Cincinnati, on the Evening of April 3, 1870. Cincinnati: R. Clarke 1872. (Rev. Thomas Vickers, Pres., Univ. Cincinnati, 1877–1884)
- The Primary Concepts of Modern Physical Science.

John Bernhard Stallo (October 1873). "The Primary Concepts of Modern Physical Science I". Popular Science Monthly. Vol. 3. pp. 705–717.
John Bernhard Stallo (November 1873). "The Primary Concepts of Modern Physical Science II". Popular Science Monthly. Vol. 4. pp. 92–108.
John Bernhard Stallo (December 1873). "The Primary Concepts of Modern Physical Science III". Popular Science Monthly. Vol. 4. pp. 219–231.
John Bernhard Stallo (January 1874). "The Primary Concepts of Modern Physical Science IV". Popular Science Monthly. Vol. 4. pp. 349–361.

- John Bernhard Stallo (January 1874). "Speculative Science". Popular Science Monthly. Vol. 21. pp. 145–164.
- The Concepts and Theories of Modern Physics. New York and London, 1882; 2nd ed. 1884; 3rd ed. 1888; Cambridge, Mass., 1960.
- Reden, Abhandlungen und Briefe. New York: E. Staiger, 1893.

== Notes ==
Diplomatic posts
| Preceded by William Waldorf Astor | Minister to the Kingdom of Italy; 1885–1889 | Succeeded by Albert G. Porter |
