= James M. Gregg =

American politician

James Gregg
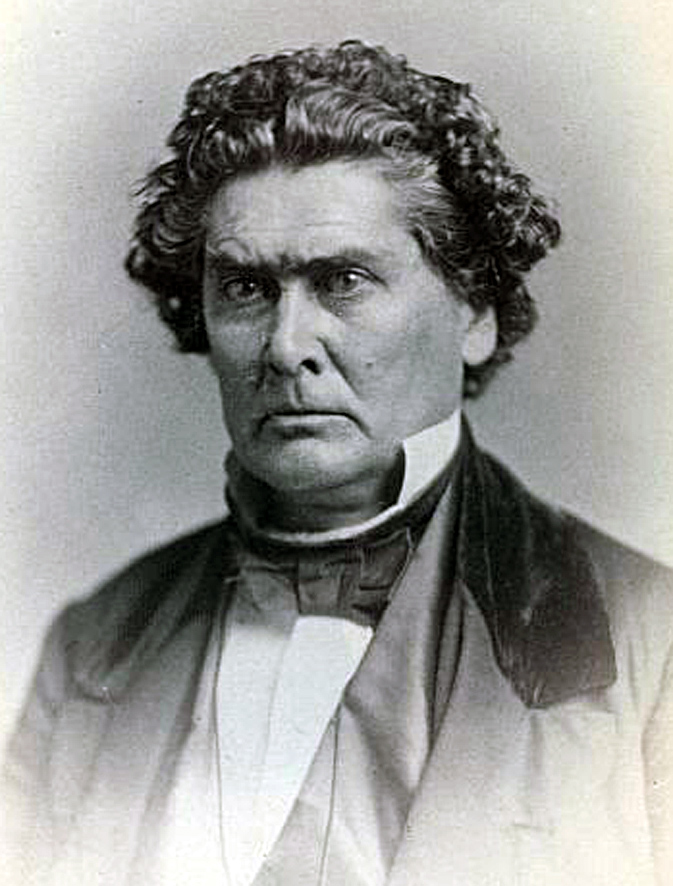

Member of the U.S. House of Representatives from Indiana's 6th district
- In office March 4, 1857 – March 3, 1859
- Preceded by: Lucien Barbour
- Succeeded by: Albert G. Porter

Personal details
- Born: June 26, 1806 Patrick County, Virginia, U.S.
- Died: June 16, 1869 (aged 62) Danville, Indiana, U.S
- Party: Democratic

James Madison Gregg (June 26, 1806 – June 16, 1869) was an American lawyer and politician who served one term as a U.S. representative from Indiana from 1857 to 1859.

== Biography ==
Born in Patrick County, Virginia, Gregg attended the public schools and later studied law. He was admitted to the bar in 1830 and began practice in Danville, Indiana soon thereafter. County surveyor of Hendricks County 1834–1837. He served as clerk of the circuit court from 1837 to 1845.

=== Congress ===
Gregg was elected as a Democrat to the Thirty-fifth Congress (March 4, 1857 – March 3, 1859). He was an unsuccessful candidate for reelection in 1858 to the Thirty-sixth Congress.

=== Later career and death ===
He resumed the practice of law in Danville, Indiana. He served as member of the State house of representatives in 1862.

He died in Danville, Indiana, on June 16, 1869. He was interred in South Cemetery.

U.S. House of Representatives
Preceded by Lucien Barbour	Member of the U.S. House of Representatives from Indiana's 6th congressional district 1857-1859	Succeeded by Albert G. Porter
