= Franklin Landers =

American politician (1825–1901)

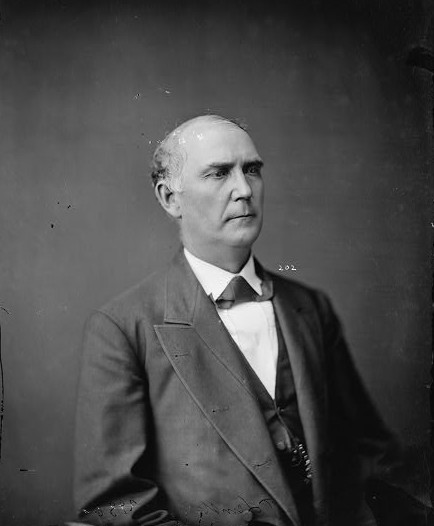
- Landers, 1865–1880

Member of the U.S. House of Representatives from Indiana's 7th district
- In office March 4, 1875 – March 3, 1877
- Preceded by: Thomas J. Cason
- Succeeded by: John Hanna

Personal details
- Born: March 22, 1825 Landersdale, Morgan County, Indiana, U.S.
- Died: September 10, 1901 (aged 76) Indianapolis, Indiana, U.S.
- Resting place: Crown Hill Cemetery and Arboretum, Section 12, Lot 28
- Party: Democratic

Franklin Landers (March 22, 1825 – September 10, 1901) was a U.S. representative from Indiana.

Born near the village of Landersdale in Morgan County, Indiana, Landers attended local schools. At the age of twenty-one he engaged in teaching school. He was associated with his brother in mercantile pursuits at Waverly, Indiana. Landers laid out the town of Brooklyn, Indiana, where he engaged in mercantile pursuits and stock raising. He served as a member of the State Senate from 1860 to 1864. He moved to Indianapolis in 1865 and engaged in the dry-goods business. In 1873, he became the head of a pork-packing house.

Landers was elected as a Democrat to the Forty-fourth Congress (March 4, 1875 – March 3, 1877).

A reporter described him as "a big-framed, big-boned man, stoop-shouldered and red-faced. he shambles in his walk and talks in a low, cooing tone of confidentiality. He chews his cigar distractedly, rarely consuming it with fire. His eyes are soft and insinuating. His face is placid and innocent. ... His grammar education was neglected. He is not 'high-toned.' He dresses as stylish as H. G. [Horace Greeley] did, and could give a better account of 'what I know about farming,' for he does know a potato patch from a field of buckwheat." Landers had been elected as a supporter of currency inflation and the representative of the agrarian wing of the Democratic party. "The man who don't like the smell of a hog is a leetle too nice to live," he told one interviewer. He detested and denounced the national banking system, and after the Panic of 1873 allegedly withdrew his name from all the deposits at the First National Bank in Indianapolis, putting them all in his wife's name instead.

With support from the Greenbackers, Landers had a good shot at winning the Democratic gubernatorial nomination in 1876. At the convention, however, his forces deadlocked with those of Congressman William S. Holman, and a compromise choice, J. D. "Blue-Jeans" Williams, was selected instead. Discouraged, Landers announced that he meant to quit politics. "I am not a candidate for anything henceforth," he declared. "I am only a private man whose only mission in politics will be to vote the democratic ticket....The dirty skunks! I spent my money to carry the district at the state election, and I pulled them through, and when I went home I found them organized against me. No, sir; your Kerrs, McDonalds, and Hendrickses can run the machine. I am done." He was induced to change his mind, however, and much to the Greenbacker party's resentment, spurned their nomination for governor. So when he got into the congressional race against John Hanna, a prominent lawyer "of vocal volume," the Greenbackers put a candidate of their own into the race, ensuring his defeat.

He engaged in the management of his farming lands.

He died in Indianapolis, Indiana on September 10, 1901. He was interred in Crown Hill Cemetery.

Party political offices
Preceded by James D. Williams	Democratic nominee for Governor of Indiana; 1880	Succeeded by Isaac P. Gray
U.S. House of Representatives
Preceded by Thomas J. Cason	Member of the U.S. House of Representatives from Indiana's 7th congressional district March 4, 1875 – March 3, 1877	Succeeded by John Hanna
