= Arch McCarthy =

American baseball player (born 1881)

- Pitcher
- Born: January 21, 1881; Ypsilanti, Michigan, U.S.
- Died: Unknown
- Batted: Unknown Threw: Right

MLB debut
- August 14, 1902, for the Detroit Tigers

Last MLB appearance
- September 18, 1902, for the Detroit Tigers

MLB statistics
- Games pitched: 10
- Win–loss record: 2–7
- Earned run average: 6.13
- Stats at Baseball Reference

Teams
- Detroit Tigers (1902)

Archibald Joseph McCarthy (born January 21, 1881) was an American pitcher in Major League Baseball. His career was short, and he only played for six weeks for the Detroit Tigers in 1902 and did not return for the following season. He debuted on August 14, 1902, at the age of 21 and played through the end of the 1902 Detroit Tigers season until September 18. Nothing is known of Arch McCarthy's life before or after his professional career, and his date of death is unknown.

McCarthy pitched in 10 games during his six weeks for the Detroit Tigers, and he accumulated a win-loss record of 2–7 and a fairly high earned run average of 6.13. He had only 10 strikeouts in 72 innings pitched. His batting statistics were also very poor. He had only two hits in 28 at bats for a batting average of .071. That year, teammates Pete LePine, Lew Post, Lou Schiappacasse, and Ed Fisher also played their whole professional careers within the last few weeks of the Tigers' 1902 season. Jack Cronin was the only of the 12 pitchers on the Tigers roster that year to finish with a higher earned run average than McCarthy, although Cronin had a win-loss record of 0–0 as a relief pitcher. The Tigers struggled immensely in their second season in the American League and were constantly changing their roster, which was largely filled with young and inexperienced rookies. The Tigers finished the season with a record of 52–82–2 (.385) at 30½ games out of first place, which remains one of the team's worst seasons in history.
