= Fredrick Vieche =

American politician

Fredrick Viehe

Lieutenant Governor of Indiana
- In office November 20, 1880 – January 8, 1881
- Governor: Isaac P. Gray
- Preceded by: Isaac P. Gray
- Succeeded by: Thomas Hanna

Personal details
- Born: September 2, 1832 Westphalia, Prussia (now Germany)
- Died: November 27, 1888 (aged 56) Indiana, U.S.
- Party: Democratic
- Education: Wittenberg Academy

Fredrick Vieche (1832–1888) was a politician from the U.S. state of Indiana. Between 1880 and 1881 he served as acting lieutenant governor of Indiana.

== Life ==
Frederick W. Viehe was born on September 2, 1832, in Westphalia, Prussia, and emigrated with his father to the United States in 1845; they settled in the wilderness about 20 miles from Vincennes, Indiana. He attended Wittenberg Academy (now Wittenberg University) in Springfield, Ohio, for two years. While at Witteberg, he worked odd jobs and was a geometry and algebra tutor at Greenway High School. After obtaining a $125.00 loan from an educational fund, he moved to Noblesville, Indiana, and read law under Judge David Moss. After running out of money, he hitchhiked to Knox County. Using money he saved, Viehe purchased a copy of Kent's Commentaries to further his legal education, all the while teaching school. He was admitted to the practice of law in Indiana in 1859.

He married the former Lizzie W. Sage, the daughter of Col. Sage of Bridgeport, Illinois, in 1872 and from this union were born three children - May, John and Fred.

He joined the Democratic Party and was elected as city attorney in Vincennes, serving from 1869 to 1871, and then as prosecuting attorney for the 12th Judicial Circuit (1870). His first run at state-level office was as an independent candidate for the Indiana House of Representatives, and the election ended in a tie. This outcome necessitated a special runoff election which Viehe lost to the Democratic nominee Charles E. Crane. His second run was more fruitful, and he was elected to the Indiana House of Representatives in 1876 as a Democrat, representing Knox County. After serving a single term, Viehe was elected to the Indiana Senate in 1878 and 1880, representing Knox and Sullivan Counties, where he became the president pro tempore. In November 1880, Governor James D. Williams died and his Lieutenant Governor Isaac P. Gray followed him as new governor of Indiana. According to the state constitution, the now vacant position of the lieutenant governor was filled by the president pro tempore of the state senate, Frederick Viehe. He served in this position between November 20, 1880, and January 8, 1881, when his term ended.

In his post-legislative career, Viehe returned to the practice of law, as well as serving on various civic, political and governmental boards. He served as a special judge in the Circuit Court of Knox County, and was a city councillor in Vincennes from 1886 to 1888. The month of his death in late 1888, Judge Viehe, as he was known, switched political affiliation from the Democratic Party to the Republican Party. This was the election where fellow Hoosier politician and favorite son Benjamin Harrison was elevated the presidency.

Viehe died suddenly at his home on November 27, 1888, from a suspected accidental dose of ammonia. He was 56 years old and was interred at Greenlawn Cemetery in Vincennes.

Political offices
Preceded by Isaac P. Gray	Lieutenant Governor of Indiana; 1880–1881	Succeeded by Thomas Hanna
