= Thomas Hanna (Indiana politician) =

American politician

19th Lieutenant Governor of Indiana
- In office January 10, 1881 – January 12, 1885
- Governor: Albert G. Porter
- Preceded by: Fredrick Vieche
- Succeeded by: Mahlon D. Manson

Personal details
- Born: 1841 Avoca, Indiana, U.S.
- Died: April 13, 1901 (aged 59–60) Indianapolis, Indiana, U.S.
- Party: Republican

Thomas Hanna (1841 – April 13, 1901) was a politician from the U.S. state of Indiana. Between 1881 and 1885, he served as Lieutenant Governor of Indiana.

== Life ==
Thomas Hanna was born in Avoca, Lawrence County in Indiana. There is not much information available about his youth and education.

In 1863, during the American Civil War, Hanna enlisted into the 115th Indiana Infantry Regiment. Famously known as the “Persimmon Brigade”, the unit served in the East Tennessee theatre and suffered many hardships. It was on constant duty, while confronting General James Longstreet’s Army and covering the Cumberland Gap.

After his military service in the fall of 1864, he attended Asbury College (now named DePauw University) in Greencastle, Indiana, where he studied law and was admitted to the bar. Thomas later served as city attorney of Greencastle and as chairman of the Republican committee of Putnam County in the presidential campaign of 1876.

Hanna was nominated for Lieutenant Governor on June 10, 1880, under Governor Albert G. Porter. For two years following he was a special attorney at the United States Court of Claims. In 1885, he opened a law office in Greencastle, in which be operated up until his death. Hanna died on April 13, 1901, in Indianapolis and is laid to rest in Forest Hill Cemetery in Greencastle, Indiana

Political offices
Preceded by Fredrick Vieche	Lieutenant Governor of Indiana; 1881–1885	Succeeded by Mahlon Dickerson Manson
