= Louise Marion Bosworth =

American social scientist

- Bosworth, from the 1907 yearbook of Wellesley College
- Born: July 11, 1881; Elgin, Illinois, United States
- Died: August 6, 1982 (aged 101); Connecticut, United States
- Occupation: Social science Research

Louise Marion Bosworth (July 11, 1881 – August 6, 1982) was an American researcher at the Women's Educational and Industrial Union (WEIU) who extensively surveyed working women in order to learn about their working and living conditions.

== Biography ==
Bosworth was born in Elgin, Illinois, the daughter of Alfred Bosworth and Eleanora Wheeler Bosworth. Her father was a bank president. She graduated from Wellesley College in 1907. After college she was a research fellow at the Women's Educational and Industrial Union in Boston. She studied the income and budget of working women, finding no evidence for myths about young women's frivolous spending.

Bosworth died on August 6, 1982, at the age of 101, in Connecticut. Her papers are at the Schlesinger Library, Radcliffe Institute.

== Selected publications ==
- Bosworth, Louise Marion (1911). The Living wage of women workers; a study of incomes and expenditures of 450 women in the city of Boston/ prepared under the direction of the Department of Research, Women's Educational and Industrial Union; edited with an introduction by F. Spencer Baldwin. Longmans, Green. ISBN 0-405-07477-8.
