= David Manson (militiaman) =

Irish soldier of the American Revolutionary War

David Manson, Sr.
- Born: September 6, 1753; Belfast, County Antrim, Ireland
- Died: August 8, 1836 (aged 82); Lostcreek Township, Miami County, Ohio
- Military career
- Conflicts: American Revolutionary War; War of 1812

David Manson, Sr. (September 6, 1753 – August 8, 1836) was an early patriot who fought in the American Revolutionary War on the side of the colonies in Pennsylvania and New Jersey.

== Biography ==
David Manson, Sr. was born September 6, 1753 in Belfast, County Antrim, Ireland, the son of William Manson, Sr. He immigrated to America with his siblings, William Manson, Jr. and Eleanor Manson. On February 1, 1780, he married Jean Johnston. Manson and his sons, William Johnston Manson and David Manson, Jr., served in the War of 1812.

Manson served under various enlistments from July 1776 to January 1778. He reenlisted in what was called the "Flying Camp" under Colonel William Cosby. He aided in building Fort Lee and retreated when Fort Washington was taken. Manson served as an aide to General George Washington and held the rank of private. He was with Washington on the night of December 25–26, 1776 when he crossed the Delaware River.

He died August 8, 1836, in Lostcreek Township, Miami County, Ohio. One of his descendants was Civil War Brigadier General Mahlon Dickerson Manson.
