= Mahlon Dickerson Manson =

American politician

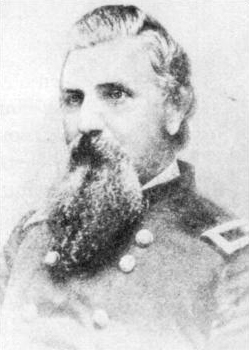

20th Lieutenant Governor of Indiana
- In office January 12, 1885 – August 3, 1886
- Governor: Isaac P. Gray
- Preceded by: Thomas Hanna
- Succeeded by: Robert S. Robertson

17th Auditor of Indiana
- In office January 25, 1879 – January 25, 1881
- Governor: James D. Williams; Isaac P. Gray; Albert G. Porter
- Preceded by: Ebenezer Henderson
- Succeeded by: Edward H. Wolfe

Member of the U.S. House of Representatives from Indiana's 7th district
- In office March 4, 1871 – March 3, 1873
- Preceded by: Godlove S. Orth
- Succeeded by: Thomas J. Cason

Personal details
- Born: February 20, 1820 Piqua, Ohio, US
- Died: February 4, 1895 (aged 74) Frankfort, Indiana, US
- Party: Democratic
- Profession: Druggist

Military service
- Allegiance: United States; Union
- Branch/service: US Army; Union Army
- Rank: Brigadier General
- Battles/wars: Mexican–American War; American Civil War; Battle of Mill Springs; Battle of Richmond; Battle of Resaca

Mahlon Dickerson Manson (February 20, 1820 – February 4, 1895) was a druggist, Indiana politician, and a Union general in the American Civil War.

== Biography ==
Manson was born in Piqua, Ohio, to David Manson Jr., and Sarah Cornwall. He was a descendant of David Manson, an aide to Revolutionary War General George Washington. His family moved to Crawfordsville, Indiana. He was a school teacher in Montgomery County, Indiana. He studied medicine in Cincinnati, Ohio, and gave medical lectures in New Orleans. During the Mexican–American War he served with the 5th Indiana Volunteers as a captain. He was a druggist in Crawfordsville, Indiana, and a member of the Indiana Legislature.

At the beginning of the Civil War, he was appointed a captain in the 10th Indiana Infantry and was promoted to colonel in less than a month. He commanded a brigade in the Army of the Ohio at the Battle of Mill Springs in 1862 and was promoted to brigadier general on March 24, 1862, based on his actions there. General Manson was wounded in the thigh and captured by Confederate forces at the Battle of Richmond, Kentucky. He was exchanged two months later and fought Morgan on his raid into Ohio. In the span of two months, Manson advanced from brigade, to division and then to command the XXIII Corps. He led the corps during the Knoxville Campaign seeing action at Campbell's Station and Knoxville. General Manson returned to brigade command, in the Army of the Ohio, during the Atlanta campaign and was seriously wounded in the Battle of Resaca, Georgia.

After the war, he served in the United States House of Representatives as a Democrat from 1871 to 1873, was state auditor, and the 20th Lieutenant Governor of Indiana from 1885 to 1886.

Manson died in Frankfort, Indiana, and is buried in Oak Hill Cemetery, Crawfordsville.

== See also ==
- List of American Civil War generals (Union)

Political offices
Preceded by Ebenezer Henderson	Indiana State Auditor; 1879-1881	Succeeded by Edward H. Wolfe
Preceded by Thomas Hanna	Lieutenant Governor of Indiana; 1885–1886	Succeeded by Robert S. Robertson
Military offices
Preceded by George Lucas Hartsuff	Commander of the XXIII Corps (ACW); September 24, 1863 – December 20, 1863	Succeeded by Jacob D. Cox
U.S. House of Representatives
Preceded by Godlove S. Orth	Member of the U.S. House of Representatives from Indiana's 7th congressional district March 4, 1871 – March 3, 1873	Succeeded by Thomas J. Cason
