= Albert G. Porter =

American politician

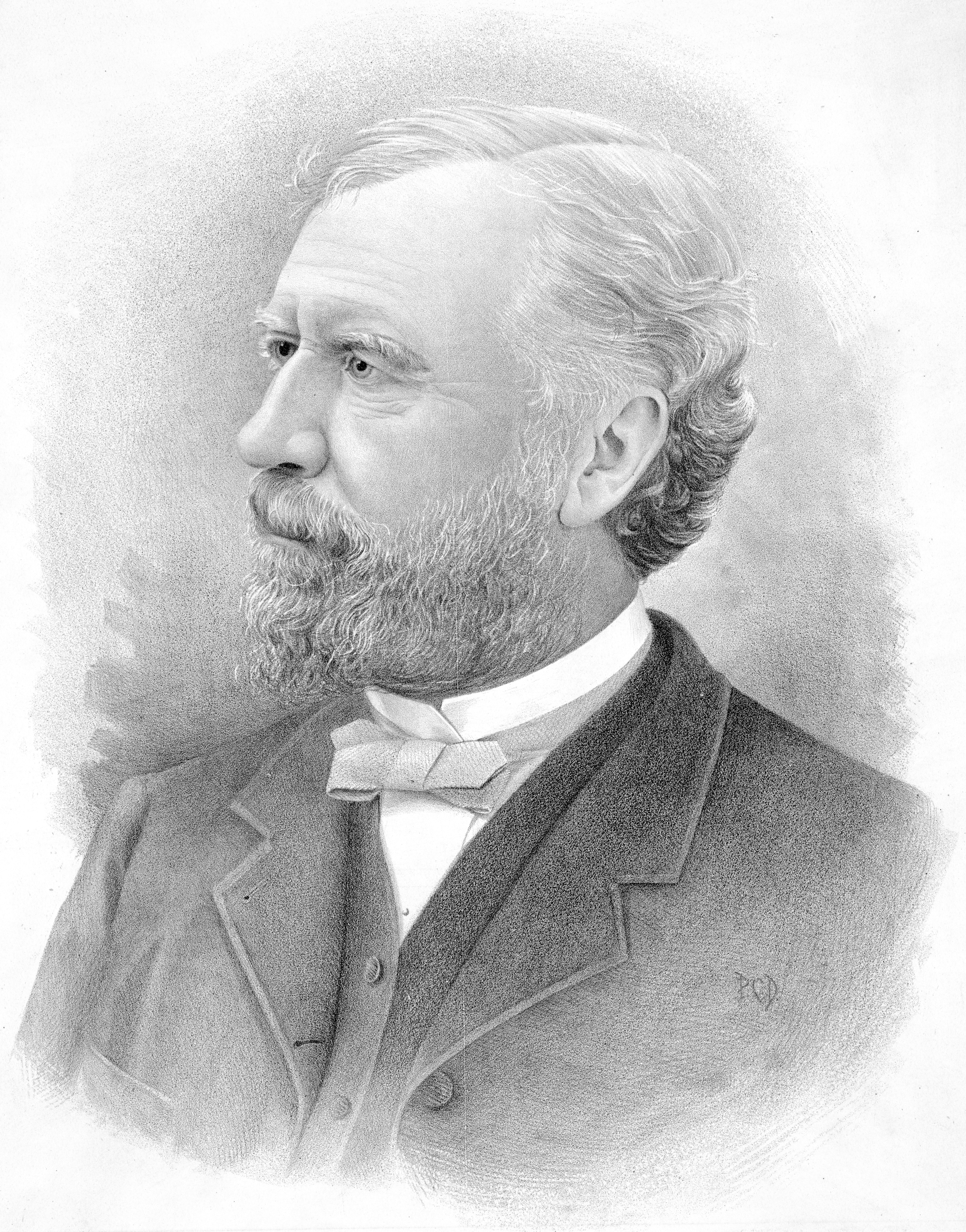
- Print published in 1888 by Baker & Randolph, after a photo by Clark

4th United States Minister to Italy
- In office June 6, 1889 – July 9, 1892
- President: Benjamin Harrison
- Preceded by: John Stallo
- Succeeded by: William Potter

19th Governor of Indiana
- In office January 10, 1881 – January 12, 1885
- Lieutenant: Thomas Hanna
- Preceded by: Isaac P. Gray
- Succeeded by: Isaac P. Gray

Member of the U.S. House of Representatives from Indiana's 6th district
- In office March 4, 1859 – March 3, 1863
- Preceded by: James M. Gregg
- Succeeded by: Ebenezer Dumont

Personal details
- Born: Albert Gallatin Porter; April 20, 1824 Lawrenceburg, Indiana, US
- Died: May 3, 1897 (aged 73) Indianapolis, Indiana, US
- Resting place: Crown Hill Cemetery and Aboretum, Section 12, Lot 6; 39.820587°N 86.1754254°W
- Party: Democratic (until 1856); Republican (1856–1897)
- Spouse(s): Minerva Brown Porter (1846–1875); Cornelia Stone (1881–1886)
- Children: 5

Albert Gallatin Porter (April 20, 1824 – May 3, 1897) was an American politician who served as the 19th governor of Indiana from 1881 to 1885 and as a United States Congressman from 1859 to 1863. Originally a Democrat, he joined the Republican Party in 1856 after being expelled by the pro-slavery faction of the Democratic Party. Only the second person born in Indiana to become the state's governor, he reluctantly accepted his party's nomination to run. His term saw the start of Indiana's industrialization that continued for several decades. During the second half of his term a strong Democratic majority took control of the Indiana General Assembly and revoked all of the governor's appointment powers and other authorities, weakening the position to its lowest level in the history of the state.

== Early life ==
=== Family and background ===
Albert G. Porter was born on April 20, 1824, in Lawrenceburg, Indiana, the son of Thomas and Myra Tousey Porter. His father, a veteran of the War of 1812, was a bank teller at the Farmer and Mechanic's Bank. Established by the state government in 1818, the bank folded after the Panic of 1819. His father then served several years as a county clerk until the family moved to Boone County, Kentucky, after his mother inherited her father's farm. The large farm neighbored the Ohio River at the area's most convenient crossing point, and Porter began managing his father's ferryboat, crossing wagons and passengers across the river.

Using the money he earned from working the ferry, he enrolled in Hanover College in 1839, but soon ran out of money to continue his education. His uncle offered to pay for the remainder of his school, provided that he would switch to a Methodist school. Porter agreed, and attended and graduated from Asbury University (now DePauw University) in 1843. The following year he moved to Indianapolis, where he took a job in the state's auditors office and briefly served as a private secretary to Governor of Indiana James Whitcomb. Whitcomb influenced Porter to pursue a career in law, so he began to study law in the office of Philip Spooner. He was admitted to the Indiana bar in 1845 and entered a corporate law practice in Indianapolis headed by Hiram Brown. He met and married Brown's daughter, Minerva, on November 20, 1846. The couple had five children.

Porter took a secondary job writing for the Indianapolis Journal, recording Indiana Supreme Court decisions, and gained a good reputation with the court. He served as the city attorney from 1851 until 1853, having run for office as a Democrat. In 1853 he was appointed to a vacant reporter seat for the Supreme Court. He was elected to the position in 1854 by a strong majority and served until 1856. That year, he became embroiled in the ongoing political feud between the pro-slavery and anti-slavery factions of the state Democratic party. The pro-slavery faction won, and Porter was among the anti-slavery men expelled from the party, causing him to join the newly formed Republican Party. With his brother-in-law's help, Porter began to organize the Marion County Republican Party, and ran for the city council on the Republican ticket. He served a partial term in the office but resigned in 1859 after having won the 1858 congressional election.

=== Congressman ===
He served in the United States House of Representatives until 1863, having been reelected once. As a congressman during the American Civil War, he supported much of the wartime legislation. His primary contribution was his own investigation of the railroads, which had accepted numerous land grants from the government during the war and the years leading up to it. He calculated the value of the transactions, and balanced it again the amount the railroads were demanding for payment for shipping men and munitions, saving the at time cash-strapped government several million dollars. He was nominated a third time to run for Congress in 1862, but declined primarily because of the position's poor salary and his need to replenish his savings.

He returned to Indianapolis, where he became head of one of the state's leading law firms; his most famous partner was future United States President Benjamin Harrison. He took on several high-profile cases, including the Ex parte Milligan case, which ended before the United States Supreme Court, who ruled that Lambdin P. Milligan, who had been arrested during the war for subversive activities and tried and convicted by a military tribunal, should be released because the tribunal had no authority to prosecute so long as the civil courts were still in operation.

He was nominated as a Republican candidate to run for governor in 1876, but he declined. In 1878, Porter was appointed by President Rutherford B. Hayes as Comptroller of the United States Treasury. As comptroller he oversaw the settlement of numerous treasury disputes dating back to the Civil War. In 1880, while Porter was still in Washington, his party again nominated him to run for governor, without his knowledge. By the time he received word, his party was already printing campaign posters and the party leaders were able to convince him to run for the good of the party. He reluctantly accepted, and returned to Indianapolis.

== Governor ==
=== Republican legislature ===
One of the most notable things about the campaign was Porter's sudden change in attire. In Washington he was well known for his style and manner of dress, but upon accepting the nomination he began dressing like a farmer, including wearing a straw hat. The campaign was "vigorous", and Porter traveled to all but five of the state's counties to stump and deliver speeches. Because he had supported the strikers in the Great Railroad Strike of 1877, he was able to gain the endorsement of the Knights of Labor, who turned out a large labor vote in his favor. Porter narrowly won the election by about 7,000 votes. He was the first Republican to win the governorship in twelve years, and along with a strong Republican majority elected to the Indiana General Assembly, he began a period of Republican dominance that would continue for a generation. Shortly after his term began, his party nominated him as a candidate for the United States Senate, but he declined.

Porter's term focused primarily on the continuing industrial development in the state, and internal improvements. Porter had the Great Kankakee Swamp in northwestern Indiana surveyed and plans drafted for its draining. The swamp was at the time one of the largest wetlands in the United States, encompassing nearly a tenth of Indiana and a large part of Illinois. The plans were submitted to the General Assembly who approved of the plan, resulting in the reclamation of more than 800,000 acres (3,200 km^{2}) of land. To implement the project, the governor also advocated the creation of the Department of Geology and Natural History, the forerunner of the Indiana Department of Natural Resources.

Among Porter's other successful projects were the creation of the State Board of Health, the institution of mining regulations that significantly improved working conditions for miners in the state, and advocacy for women's rights. In 1881, he delivered a speech to the General Assembly urging them to grant suffrage to women. Although no action was taken on his advice, it renewed the debate which had seen little advancement since Governor James D. Williams had issued a similar request several years earlier. Porter used his appointment powers to advance the women's cause, appointing women to a variety of positions in state agencies, but primarily to board positions overseeing the state's benevolent institutions, such as hospitals and orphanages. He also successfully forced out many of the non-expert members of important state boards and replaced them with field experts.

=== Democratic legislature ===
After several months of debate, the General Assembly finally agreed to a compromise to grant women the right to vote by agreeing to also enact prohibition legislation. They proposed an amendment to the state constitution that would both grant women the right to vote, and enact statewide prohibition. The two issues were too much for the electorate to consider at once, and in the mid-term election of 1882, the amendment was overwhelming defeated and so were the Republicans as a large Democratic majority came to power.

The second half of Porter's term was one of the uncommon times in Indiana's history where the legislature was completely controlled by a party hostile to the governor. Typical to such occasions, the assembly began to reign in the governor whose weak constitutional position made it difficult to resist. One of their first acts was to revoke all of the governor's appointment powers. He vetoed the bill on its first passage, but the assembly quickly overrode it, taking the responsibility for appointing all board members in the state, a power the governor had held since the Civil War. They also began to enact legislation designed to weaken Republican power across the state, first by creating a state board to manage the newly formed Indianapolis metropolitan police department, taking away control from the Republican-controlled city government. Along with other restrictive measures placed on the governor, they weakened the executive office to its lowest point in the history of the state. Nearly fifty years would pass before governors began to regain their former power.

The only significant legislation the governor was able to have passed during this time was a bill to fund a relief program following a flood that devastated the Wabash River and Ohio River areas in 1883. At the time the flood was the worst in the state's recorded history, and destroyed and damaged many towns and cities that now needed significant need of assistance. Consecutive terms being banned by the state constitution, Porter left office in 1884 and returned to his law practice.

== Final years and legacy ==
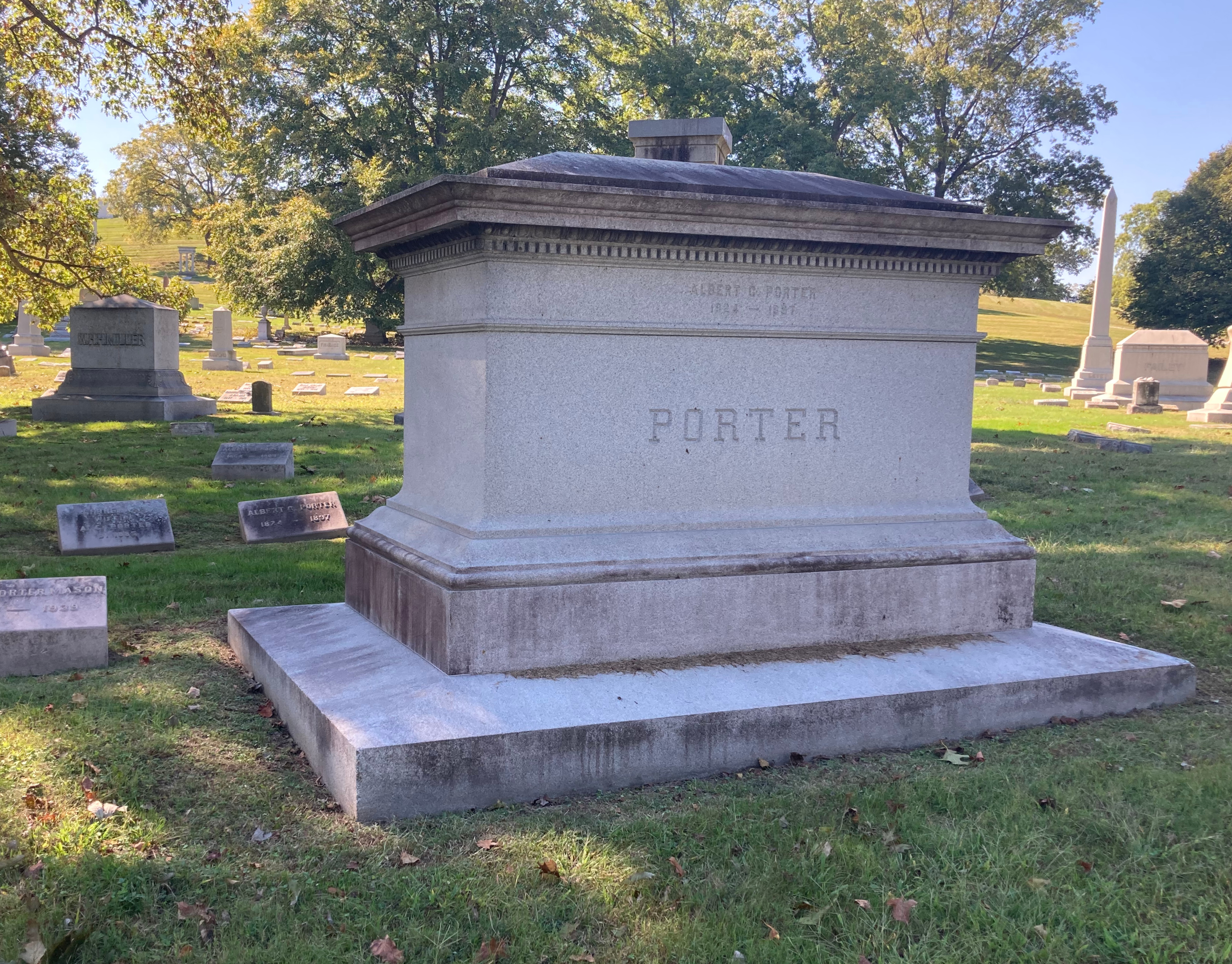
Porter's grave at Crown Hill Cemetery

Porter's wife had died in 1875, and on January 5, 1881, he married Cornela Stone. The marriage was brief, and she died in 1886. His party attempted to nominate him to run for governor again in 1888, but he declined. He did serve as a delegate to the 1888 Republican National Convention, where he delivered a speech and nominated his old law partner Benjamin Harrison to run for president. Harrison won the nomination and campaign and appointed Porter as Minister to Italy in 1889. During his time there, he oversaw negotiations with Italy concerning the lynching of eleven Italians in 1891, following a highly publicized murder trial in New Orleans.

He resigned in 1892 and returned to Indianapolis, where he spent the final years of his life working on a book on the history of Indiana. He never finished the book, which remains unpublished. He suffered a hard fall from which his health never recovered, leading to his death on May 3, 1897, and was buried in Crown Hill Cemetery.

== Electoral history ==
Indiana gubernatorial election, 1880
Party	Candidate	Votes	%
Republican	Albert G. Porter	231,405	49.2
Democratic	Franklin Landers	224,452	47.7
Greenback	Richard Gregg	14,881	3.2

== See also ==
- List of governors of Indiana

Party political offices
Preceded by Benjamin Harrison	Republican nominee for Governor of Indiana; 1880	Succeeded by William H. Calkins
Political offices
Preceded by Isaac P. Gray	Governor of Indiana; January 10, 1881 – January 12, 1885	Succeeded by Isaac P. Gray
U.S. House of Representatives
Preceded by James M. Gregg	Member of the U.S. House of Representatives from Indiana's 6th congressional district March 4, 1859 – March 3, 1863	Succeeded by Ebenezer Dumont
Diplomatic posts
Preceded by John B. Stallo	Minister to Italy; June 6, 1889 – July 9, 1892	Succeeded by William Potter
