= Isaac P. Gray =

American politician (1828–1895)

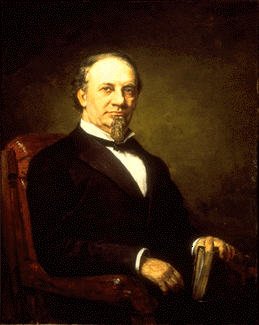
- Portrait, 1888, by Theodore C. Steele

18th and 20th Governor of Indiana
- In office November 20, 1880 – January 10, 1881
- Lieutenant: Fredrick Vieche (acting)
- Preceded by: James D. Williams
- Succeeded by: Albert G. Porter
- In office January 12, 1885 – January 14, 1889
- Lieutenant: Mahlon D. Manson; Alonzo G. Smith (acting)
- Preceded by: Albert G. Porter
- Succeeded by: Alvin P. Hovey

18th Lieutenant Governor of Indiana
- In office January 13, 1877 – November 2, 1880
- Governor: James D. Williams
- Preceded by: Leonidas Sexton
- Succeeded by: Fredrick Vieche as Acting Lieutenant Governor

Member of the Indiana Senate
- In office 1870–1874

Personal details
- Born: October 18, 1828 Chester County, Pennsylvania, U.S.
- Died: February 14, 1895 (aged 66) Mexico City, Mexico
- Party: Whig; Republican (1865–1876); Democrat (1876–1895)
- Spouse: Eliza Jane Jaqua Gray

Military service
- Years of service: 1861-1865
- Rank: Colonel
- Commands: 4th Indiana Cavalry Regiment

Isaac Pusey Gray (October 18, 1828 – February 14, 1895) was the 18th and 20th governor of the U.S. state of Indiana from 1880 to 1881 and from 1885 to 1889. Originally a Republican, he oversaw the forceful passage of the post-American Civil War constitutional amendments while he was a member of the Indiana Senate. He became a Democrat following the corruption of the Administration of Ulysses S. Grant but was regularly stymied by his Democratic adversaries who constantly referred to his tactics while a Republican, earning him the nickname "Sisyphus of the Wabash."

== Early life ==
=== Family and background ===
Isaac Pusey Gray was born on October 18, 1828, in Chester County, Pennsylvania, the son of John and Hannah Worthington Gray, two Quaker innkeepers. At age eight, his family moved to Urbana, Ohio and in 1842 to New Madison, Ohio. In New Madison, Gray first attended common school and obtained some formal education. After school he became a clerk in a dry-goods store, and later became the owner of the store after purchasing it from his former boss. He married Eliza Jaqua on September 8, 1850, and the couple had four sons. Two of them died in infancy, but the other two grew up to become lawyers.

Gray and his family moved to Union City, Indiana in 1855 where he opened a new store. He soon became involved in local politics and became prominent in his community. He began to study law on his own in his spare time and was admitted to the bar in 1861. He later said that he studied law to further his political career, which was very important in Indiana politics at that time.

=== American Civil War ===
Only a month after he opened a law office the American Civil War began, and Gray set out to raise a company of volunteers. He entered the Union army as a Colonel and given command of the 77th Indiana Infantry Regiment (later the 4th Indiana Cavalry Regiment) in the fall of 1862. He led his regiment against forces under Confederate General John Hunt Morgan near Munfordville, Kentucky in December 1862. He served for about a year before resigning from the army after being denied a promotion.

When Morgan's Raid into Indiana in July 1863 occurred, Gray was given command of a regiment of the Indiana Legion to help repel the invasion. His unit was disbanded after about a week, once Morgan was forced to flee the state. Gray remained in the militia after the raid, taking a command role in his region, but saw no action. After the war he returned to his law practice.

== Early political career ==
Gray began to become moderately wealthy and expanded his business interest into grain processing and banking. He was one of the founding members of the Citizens Bank in Union City in 1865. He continued to be interested in politics, and decided to run for public office. He had been a Whig before the party collapsed in the mid-1850s, and decided to become a Republican following the war. In his first run for office, he competed against George Washington Julian in the Republican primary, hoping to become a candidate for Congress, but was defeated in 1866.

=== Senator ===
In 1870, he ran as a Republican candidate for the Indiana Senate. He won the election and represented Randolph County. He was elected Senate President pro tempore. He took an active role in helping to push through the senate the ratification of the post-war amendments to ban slavery, grant blacks the right to vote, and revoke the right to vote from many southerners.

When the final amendment was submitted for ratification, the Democrats attempted to leave the Senate to deny the body quorum. Gray had predicted the maneuver, and had already run to the door, barred it shut, and locked it. The Democrats demanded to know who had locked them in, and under whose authority. Gray promptly responded that it was he, causing an uproar. The Democrats then crowded into a small cloak room and refused to vote on the measure. After some time passed, and they refused to return to the floor, Gray ordered the clerks to record the Democrats present, but abstaining from voting. The Republicans then proceeded to pass the ratification, over the loud objections of the Democrats. The event would come to cause Gray considerable problems in the future.

Gray was appointed by President Ulysses Grant and confirmed by the United States Senate to serve as consul to St. Thomas the same year, but he declined the office and wrote a letter to President Grant saying he was repulsed by the corruption of his administration. Along with many other Republicans, he decided to leave the party over the situation, and joined the newly formed Liberal Republican Party. He attended its national convention in 1876, but after the party made no gains at the polls that year, he decided to become a Democrat.

== Governor of Indiana ==
=== Lieutenant governor ===
In 1876, Gray was nominated to run for Lieutenant Governor of Indiana on the ticket with James D. Williams in hope of gaining the vote of disaffected Republicans. The ploy worked, and they won the election. Despite the success, he was disliked by a large number of Democrats, who recalled his treatment of them in the Senate. When he sought the nomination for governor in the 1880 convention, he was overwhelmingly defeated, but nominated to run again as Lieutenant Governor, this time with Franklin Landers. Only a month later, Governor Williams died and Gray was elevated to his position.

During his time as governor, Gray accomplished very little, as there were only three months remaining in the term. Gray and Landers lost the election, and Gray attempted one last move to stay in public office. He was able to use his friends in the Senate to have his name entered as the Democratic candidate for Senator in 1881, but was defeated in the vote 81–62. He then returned to his law practice, but attempted a run for governor again in 1884 at the Democratic convention. By then, resistance to him had dissipated somewhat, and he won the nomination.

=== Governor ===
Gray's campaigned focused primarily on the issues of the day, his position on currency and inflation. Gray was elected governor for his own four-year term in 1884. During his term he oversaw the redistricting of the entire state for the Indiana General Assembly elections. He was widely criticized by the minority party for creating gerrymandered districts to weaken their electoral base. All of the redistricting was eventually overturned by the state supreme court.

His term was marked by what came to be called the Black Day of the General Assembly. The assembly was split with Democrats controlling the Senate 31–19, while the House of Representatives was split 52–44–4, with Republicans holding the majority, and Greenbacks holding four seats. In a joint session, it would split the vote 75 Democrat, 71 Republican, with the 4 Greenbacks holding the deciding votes. Knowing that he could probably sway one of the Greenbacks to vote for his bid for the United States Senate, Gray began to attempt to have his name entered as a candidate. Some Democratic leaders were still upset over his actions while he was a Republican, and decided to do whatever it took to prevent him from going any higher in office.

They convinced Lieutenant Governor Mahlon Manson to resign from office, thereby removing anyone to easily take over the governorship should Gray have to resign. They used the issue to prevent his name from being entered as a candidate. Gray decided to have a Lieutenant Governor elected in the mid-term election to fill the seat, removing the issue, and allowing him to resign and accept the candidacy. The election was held and Republican Robert S. Robertson was elected. The Democrats in the Senate refused to accept the election, and declared it unconstitutional and elected Democrat Alonzo Green Smith to serve as Lieutenant Governor. The Senate Republicans were furious and began making a commotion in the opening prayer of the session. They went ahead and had Robertson sworn in but the Democrats filed a court suit to prevent him from being seated.

The situation continued to escalate as a superior court ruled that neither Alonzo or Robertson should be seated until situation was resolved. They then forwarded the case to the Indiana Supreme Court who ruled in favor of Robertson. On the morning of February 24, Robertson entered the Senate chamber to take his seat, but as soon as he walked through the door, he was attacked by several Democratic senators who rushed him and beat him to the floor. The Senate leader ordered him removed from the chamber by guards, who then locked him out. The Republicans immediately went wild, attacking their nearest Democrat. The fight continued for several minutes until one Democrat pulled a gun and fired it into the ceiling threatening to start killing Republicans, ending the fight but making the rest of the building aware of it. The brawl soon spread to the House of Representatives and throughout the building as Republicans began to attack Democrats. Unlike the Senate, the rest of the building had a strong Republican majority, and the Democrats were soon overwhelmed. Six-hundred Republicans then beat down the door of the Senate Chamber and dragged out the Democratic senators, threatening to kill them. Gray ordered police and other officials to break up the fight, which ended after nearly a full four hours of fighting.

The Republicans refused to return to the Senate, and the House refused to continue communications with the Senate, effectively ending the legislative session. Despite all the fighting, Robertson was not seated. Gray dropped his attempt to be elected to the Senate, and the situation fueled the public's support of an amendment to make senators elected by popular vote. Gray only achieved three of his campaign goals while governor. He was able to have funds appropriated to begin construction of the Soldiers' and Sailors' Monument. He also successfully advocated the switch from a short ballot to a long ballot following several years of high voter fraud. He also successfully had the White Caps, a group involved in vigilantism in the southern part of the state, investigated and broken up.

Barred by the Constitution of Indiana from serving a consecutive term, Gray retired from office and returned to his law practice.

=== Sisyphus of the Wabash ===
Gray was one of the Democratic vice presidential candidates in 1888, but he lost the nomination to Allen G. Thurman, primarily because his enemies again brought up his actions while a Republican. He returned to his law practice, and because of all of the situations he found himself in, he gained the derisive nickname "Sisyphus of the Wabash." He was again almost nominated to run for vice president again in 1892, but was defeated again after his opponent ascended the podium to retell the story of his actions in the amendment ratification twenty years earlier.

President Grover Cleveland nominated Gray to serve as Minister to Mexico in 1893. He remained at the post until his death from double pneumonia in Mexico City on February 14, 1895. The President of Mexico ordered all the flags flown at half staff in Gray's honor and a full division of the Mexican Army escorted Gray's body back to the border where he was transferred by parcel post to Indianapolis to lie in state. His funeral was held in Union City and was buried in a nearby cemetery.

== Electoral history ==
Indiana gubernatorial election, 1884
Party	Candidate	Votes	%
Democratic	Isaac P. Gray	245,140	49.5
Republican	William H. Calkins	237,748	48.0
Greenback	Hiram Z. Leonard	8,338	1.7
Prohibition	Robert S. Dwiggins	3,868	0.8

== See also ==
- List of governors of Indiana

Party political offices
Preceded by Franklin Landers	Democratic nominee for Governor of Indiana; 1884	Succeeded by Courtland C. Matson
Political offices
Preceded by Albert G. Porter	Governor of Indiana; January 12, 1885 – January 14, 1889	Succeeded by Alvin P. Hovey
Preceded by James D. Williams	Governor of Indiana; November 20, 1880 – January 10, 1881	Succeeded by Albert G. Porter
Preceded by Leonidas Sexton	Lieutenant Governor of Indiana; January 8, 1877 - November 20, 1880	Succeeded by Fredrick Vieche; Acting Lieutenant Governor
Diplomatic posts
Preceded by Thomas Ryan	Minister to Mexico; 1893–1895	Succeeded by Matt W. Ramsom
