= 1956 in the United States =

- Decades: 1930s; 1940s; 1950s; 1960s; 1970s
- See also: History of the United States (1945–1964); Timeline of United States history (1950–1969); List of years in the United States

Events from the year 1956 in the United States.

== Incumbents ==
=== Federal government ===
- President: Dwight D. Eisenhower (R-Kansas/New York)
- Vice President: Richard Nixon (R-California)
- Chief Justice: Earl Warren (California)
- Speaker of the House of Representatives: Sam Rayburn (D-Texas)
- Senate Majority Leader: Lyndon B. Johnson (D-Texas)
- Congress: 84th

==== State governments ====
Governors and lieutenant governors

=== Governors ===
- Governor of Alabama: Jim Folsom (Democratic)
- Governor of Arizona: Ernest McFarland (Democratic)
- Governor of Arkansas: Orval Faubus (Democratic)
- Governor of California: Goodwin Knight (Republican)
- Governor of Colorado: Edwin C. Johnson (Democratic)
- Governor of Connecticut: Abraham A. Ribicoff (Democratic)
- Governor of Delaware: J. Caleb Boggs (Republican)
- Governor of Florida: LeRoy Collins (Democratic)
- Governor of Georgia: Marvin Griffin (Democratic)
- Governor of Idaho: Robert E. Smylie (Republican)
- Governor of Illinois: William G. Stratton (Republican)
- Governor of Indiana: George N. Craig (Republican)
- Governor of Iowa: Leo A. Hoegh (Republican)
- Governor of Kansas: Fred Hall (Republican)
- Governor of Kentucky: Happy Chandler (Democratic)
- Governor of Louisiana: Robert F. Kennon (Democratic) (until May 8), Earl K. Long (Democratic) (starting May 8)
- Governor of Maine: Edmund Muskie (Democratic)
- Governor of Maryland: Theodore R. McKeldin (Republican)
- Governor of Massachusetts: Christian A. Herter (Republican)
- Governor of Michigan: G. Mennen Williams (Democratic)
- Governor of Minnesota: Orville L. Freeman (Democratic)
- Governor of Mississippi: Hugh L. White (Democratic) (until January 17), James P. Coleman (Democratic) (starting January 17)
- Governor of Missouri: Phil M. Donnelly (Democratic)
- Governor of Montana: J. Hugo Aronson (Republican)
- Governor of Nebraska: Victor Anderson (Republican)
- Governor of Nevada: Charles H. Russell (Republican)
- Governor of New Hampshire: Lane Dwinell (Republican)
- Governor of New Jersey: Robert B. Meyner (Democratic)
- Governor of New Mexico: John F. Simms (Democratic)
- Governor of New York: W. Averell Harriman (Democratic)
- Governor of North Carolina: Luther H. Hodges (Democratic)
- Governor of North Dakota: Clarence Norman Brunsdale (Republican)
- Governor of Ohio: Frank J. Lausche (Democratic)
- Governor of Oklahoma: Raymond D. Gary (Democratic)
- Governor of Oregon: Paul L. Patterson (Republican) (until February 1), Elmo Smith (Republican) (starting February 1)
- Governor of Pennsylvania: George M. Leader (Democratic)
- Governor of Rhode Island: Dennis J. Roberts (Democratic)
- Governor of South Carolina: George Bell Timmerman, Jr. (Democratic)
- Governor of South Dakota: Joe Foss (Republican)
- Governor of Tennessee: Frank G. Clement (Democratic)
- Governor of Texas: Allan Shivers (Democratic)
- Governor of Utah: J. Bracken Lee (Republican)
- Governor of Vermont: Joseph B. Johnson (Republican)
- Governor of Virginia: Thomas Bahnson Stanley (Democratic)
- Governor of Washington: Arthur B. Langlie (Republican)
- Governor of West Virginia: William C. Marland (Democratic)
- Governor of Wisconsin: Walter J. Kohler Jr. (Republican)
- Governor of Wyoming: Milward L. Simpson (Republican)

=== Lieutenant governors ===
- Lieutenant Governor of Alabama: William G. Hardwick (Democratic)
- Lieutenant Governor of Arkansas: Nathan Green Gordon (Democratic)
- Lieutenant Governor of California: Harold J. Powers (Republican)
- Lieutenant Governor of Colorado: Stephen L. R. McNichols (Democratic)
- Lieutenant Governor of Connecticut: Charles W. Jewett (Democratic)
- Lieutenant Governor of Delaware: John W. Rollins (Democratic)
- Lieutenant Governor of Georgia: S. Ernest Vandiver (Democratic)
- Lieutenant Governor of Idaho: J. Berkeley Larsen (Republican)
- Lieutenant Governor of Illinois: John William Chapman (Republican)
- Lieutenant Governor of Indiana: Harold W. Handley (Republican)
- Lieutenant Governor of Iowa: Leo Elthon (Republican)
- Lieutenant Governor of Kansas: John McCuish (Republican)
- Lieutenant Governor of Kentucky: Harry Lee Waterfield (Democratic)
- Lieutenant Governor of Louisiana: C. E. "Cap" Barham (Democratic) (until May 8), Lether Frazar (Democratic) (starting May 8)
- Lieutenant Governor of Massachusetts: Sumner G. Whittier (Republican)
- Lieutenant Governor of Michigan: Philip A. Hart (Democratic)
- Lieutenant Governor of Minnesota: Karl Rolvaag (Democratic)
- Lieutenant Governor of Mississippi: Carroll Gartin (Democratic)
- Lieutenant Governor of Missouri: James T. Blair, Jr. (Democratic)
- Lieutenant Governor of Montana: George M. Gosman (Republican)
- Lieutenant Governor of Nebraska: vacant
- Lieutenant Governor of Nevada: vacant
- Lieutenant Governor of New Mexico: Joseph Montoya (Democratic)
- Lieutenant Governor of New York: George DeLuca (Democratic)
- Lieutenant Governor of North Carolina: vacant
- Lieutenant Governor of North Dakota: Clarence P. Dahl (Republican)
- Lieutenant Governor of Ohio: John William Brown (Republican)
- Lieutenant Governor of Oklahoma: Cowboy Pink Williams (Democratic)
- Lieutenant Governor of Pennsylvania: Roy E. Furman (Democratic)
- Lieutenant Governor of Rhode Island: John S. McKiernan (Democratic) (until month and day unknown), vacant (starting month and day unknown)
- Lieutenant Governor of South Carolina: Ernest Hollings (Democratic)
- Lieutenant Governor of South Dakota: L. Roy Houck (Republican)
- Lieutenant Governor of Tennessee: Jared Maddux (Democratic)
- Lieutenant Governor of Texas: Ben Ramsey (Democratic)
- Lieutenant Governor of Vermont: Consuelo N. Bailey (Republican)
- Lieutenant Governor of Virginia: Allie Edward Stokes Stephens (Democratic)
- Lieutenant Governor of Washington: Emmett T. Anderson (Republican)
- Lieutenant Governor of Wisconsin: Warren P. Knowles (Republican)

== Events ==
=== January–March ===
- January 1 – Carl Perkins' record "Blue Suede Shoes" is released by Sun Records in Memphis, Tennessee.
- January 3 – Peter Pan, starring Mary Martin, is restaged live by Producers' Showcase on NBC television by popular demand.
- January 8 – Operation Auca: Five U.S. missionaries are killed by the Huaorani of Ecuador shortly after making contact with them.
- January 22 – Redondo Junction train wreck in Los Angeles kills thirty people.
- January 28 – Elvis Presley makes his national television debut on CBS in the United States on the program Stage Show, the first of six appearances on the series.
- c. January – The first book in Ed McBain's long-running 87th Precinct police procedural series, Cop Hater, is published under Evan Hunter's new pseudonym.
- February 14 – Dwight D. Eisenhower's doctors say that he is healthy enough to seek another term at the White House.
- February 16 – Only a little more than four months after the release of the 70 mm version of Oklahoma!, the film version of Rodgers and Hammerstein's Carousel, starring Gordon MacRae and Shirley Jones, is released in CinemaScope 55. MacRae and Jones had previously starred in Oklahoma! Carousel, intended for showing in 55 mm, ends up being shown only in 35 mm.
- February 22 – Elvis Presley enters the U.S. music charts for the first time with "Heartbreak Hotel".
- February 23 – Norma Jean Mortenson legally changes her name to Marilyn Monroe.
- February 24 – Doris Day records her most famous song, "Que Sera, Sera (Whatever Will Be, Will Be)"; it is from Alfred Hitchcock's The Man Who Knew Too Much, in which Day co-stars with James Stewart.
- February 29 – Dwight D. Eisenhower announces he will seek re-election as President.
- March 11 – Laurence Olivier's film, Richard III, adapted from Shakespeare's play, premieres in the U.S. in theaters and on NBC Television, on the same day as an afternoon matinée. It is one of the first such experiments of its kind. Olivier is later nominated for an Oscar for his performance.
- March 12
  - The Dow Jones Industrial Average closes above 500 for the first time rising 2.40 points, or 0.48%, to 500.24.
  - 96 U.S. Congressmen sign the Southern Manifesto, a protest against the 1954 Supreme Court ruling (Brown v. Board of Education) desegregating public education.
- March 13 – Elvis Presley releases his first Gold Album titled "Elvis Presley".
- March 15 – The Broadway musical My Fair Lady opens in New York City.
- March 21 – The 28th Academy Awards ceremony, hosted by Jerry Lewis, is held at RKO Pantages Theatre in Hollywood, Los Angeles, with the television broadcast hosted by Claudette Colbert and Joseph L. Mankiewicz in New York. Delbert Mann's Marty wins four awards, including Best Motion Picture and Best Director for Mann. The film is also tied for the most nominations with eight, along with Henry King's Love Is a Many-Splendored Thing and Daniel Mann's The Rose Tattoo.

=== April–June ===
June 29: Interstate Highway System authorized

- April 2 – The first episodes of As the World Turns and The Edge of Night are broadcast on CBS television.
- April 14 – Videotape is first demonstrated at the 1956 NARTB (now NAB) convention in Chicago by Ampex. It is the demonstration of the first practical and commercially successful videotape format known as 2" Quadruplex.
- April 19 – American actress Grace Kelly marries Rainier III, Prince of Monaco.
- April 21 – Former U.S. First Daughter Margaret Truman marries Clifton Daniel.
- April 27 – Heavyweight boxing champion Rocky Marciano retires without losing a professional boxing match.
- May 2 – The Methodist Church in the U.S. decides, at its General Conference, to grant women full ordained clergy status. It also calls for an end to racial segregation in the denomination.
- May 22 – The Peacock logo of NBC is introduced on television.
- June 4 – Montgomery bus boycott: Browder v. Gayle is decided by the United States District Court for the Middle District of Alabama, ruling state bus segregation laws unconstitutional; this will be confirmed on appeal.
- June 5 – Elvis Presley performs "Hound Dog" on The Milton Berle Show, scandalizing the audience with his suggestive hip movements.
- June 8 – General Electric/Telechron introduces model 7H241 "The Snooz Alarm", first snooze alarm clock.
- June 14
  - The Flag of the United States Army is formally dedicated.
- June 21 – Playwright Arthur Miller appears before the House Un-American Activities Committee in Washington, D.C.
- June 26 & August 23 – Books published by discredited psychoanalyst Wilhelm Reich are burned under a court injunction.
- June 29
  - Actress Marilyn Monroe marries playwright Arthur Miller in White Plains, New York.
  - President Dwight D. Eisenhower signs the Federal Aid Highway Act, creating the Interstate Highway System.
- June 30 – A TWA Lockheed Constellation and United Airlines Douglas DC-7 collide in mid-air over the Grand Canyon in Arizona, killing all 128 people aboard both aircraft in the deadliest civil aviation disaster to date; the accident leads to sweeping changes in the regulation of cross-country flight and air traffic control over the U.S.
- June – 19-year-old Hunter S. Thompson is arrested as an accessory to robbery.

=== July–September ===
- July 2 – Sylvania Electric Products explosion: A laboratory experiment involving scrap thorium at Sylvania Electric Products in Bayside, New York, results in an explosion.
- July 4 – A U.S. Lockheed U-2 reconnaissance aircraft makes its first flight over the Soviet Union.
- July 13
  - Elvis Presley's recording of "Hound Dog" is released by RCA Records.
  - John McCarthy (Dartmouth), Marvin Minsky (MIT), Claude Shannon (Bell Labs) and Nathaniel Rochester (IBM) assemble the first coordinated research meeting on the topic of artificial intelligence, at Dartmouth College in Hanover, New Hampshire.
- July 16 – With the closing of its "Big Tent" show in Pittsburgh, Ringling Bros. and Barnum & Bailey Circus announces all subsequent circuses will be "arena shows" due to changing economics.
- July 24 – At New York City's Copacabana Club, Dean Martin and Jerry Lewis perform their last comedy show together (their act started on July 25, 1946).
- July 25 – 72 kilometers (45 mi) south of Nantucket Island, the Italian ocean liner SS Andrea Doria sinks after colliding with the Swedish ship MS Stockholm in heavy fog, killing 51 people.
- July 29 – McKee refinery fire kills 19 in Texas.
- July 30 – A Joint Resolution of Congress is signed by President Dwight D. Eisenhower, authorizing "In God We Trust" as the U.S. national motto.
- August 6 – After going bankrupt in 1955, the American broadcaster DuMont Television Network has its final broadcast, a boxing match from St. Nicholas Arena.
- August 11 – Painter Jackson Pollock dies in a car crash in Springs, New York.
- September 9 – Elvis Presley appears on The Ed Sullivan Show for the first time.
- September 13 – The hard disk drive is invented by an IBM team led by Reynold B. Johnson.
- September 27 – The Bell X-2 becomes the first manned aircraft to reach Mach 3.

=== October–December ===
November 6: Eisenhower re-elected

- October 5 – Cecil B. DeMille's epic film The Ten Commandments, starring Charlton Heston as Moses, is released in the U.S. It will be in the top ten of the worldwide list of highest-grossing films of all time, adjusted for inflation.
- October 8 – Baseball pitcher Don Larsen of the New York Yankees throws the only perfect game in World Series history in Game 5 of the 1956 World Series against the Brooklyn Dodgers. Yogi Berra catches the game. Dale Mitchell is the final out. The New York Yankees win the series. Larsen is named series MVP.
- October 10 – The prototype Lockheed L-1649 Starliner, the final Lockheed Constellation model, makes its first flight.
- October 17 – The Game of the Century: 13-year-old Bobby Fischer beats GM Donald Byrne in the NY Rosenwald chess tournament.
- October 29 – The Huntley-Brinkley Report debuts on NBC-TV.
- October 31 – A U.S. Navy team becomes the third group to reach the South Pole (arriving by air) and commences construction of the first permanent Amundsen–Scott South Pole Station.
- October – The Ladder becomes the first nationally distributed lesbian magazine in the U.S.
- November 1
  - City Lights Bookstore in San Francisco publishes Howl and Other Poems by Allen Ginsberg, a key work of the Beat Generation.
  - The film Oklahoma! (1955), previously released to select cities in Todd-AO, now receives a U.S. national release in CinemaScope, since not all theatres are yet equipped for Todd-AO. To accomplish this, the film has actually been shot twice, rather than printing one version in two different film processes, as is later done.
- November 3 – MGM's screen classic, The Wizard of Oz, is shown on television for the first time by CBS, as the final installment of their Ford Star Jubilee.
- November 6 – 1956 United States presidential election: Republican incumbent Dwight D. Eisenhower defeats Democratic challenger Adlai E. Stevenson in a rematch of their contest four years earlier.
- November 13 – Browder v. Gayle: The United States Supreme Court declares Alabama laws requiring segregated buses illegal, thus ending the Montgomery bus boycott.
- November 30 – African American boxer Floyd Patterson wins the world heavyweight championship that is vacant after the retirement of Rocky Marciano.
- December 2 – A pipe bomb planted by George Metesky explodes at the Paramount Theater in Brooklyn, New York, injuring 6 people.
- December 3 – The 1956 Bush Terminal explosion occurs in Brooklyn.
- December 4 – The Million Dollar Quartet (Elvis Presley, Jerry Lee Lewis, Carl Perkins and Johnny Cash) get together at Sun Studio for the only time.
- December 18 – To Tell the Truth debuts on CBS-TV.
- December 31 – Bob Barker makes his TV debut as host of the game show Truth or Consequences.

=== Ongoing ===
- Cold War (1947–1991)
- Second Red Scare (1947–1957)

== Births ==
=== January ===
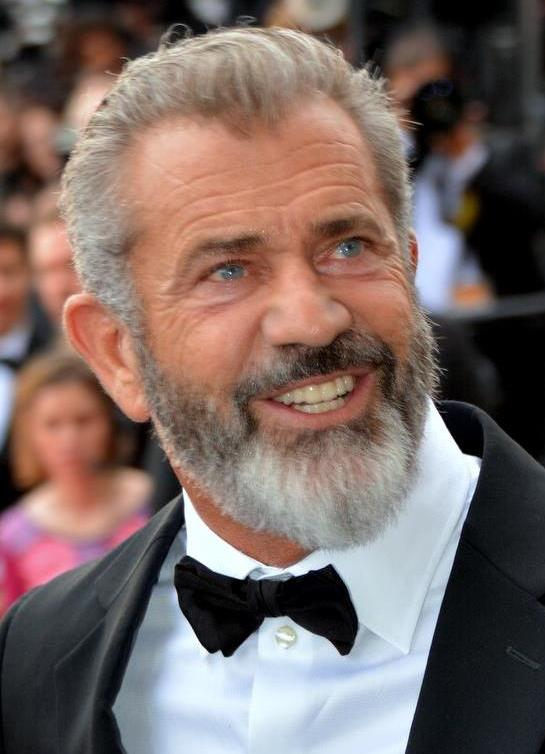
Mel Gibson

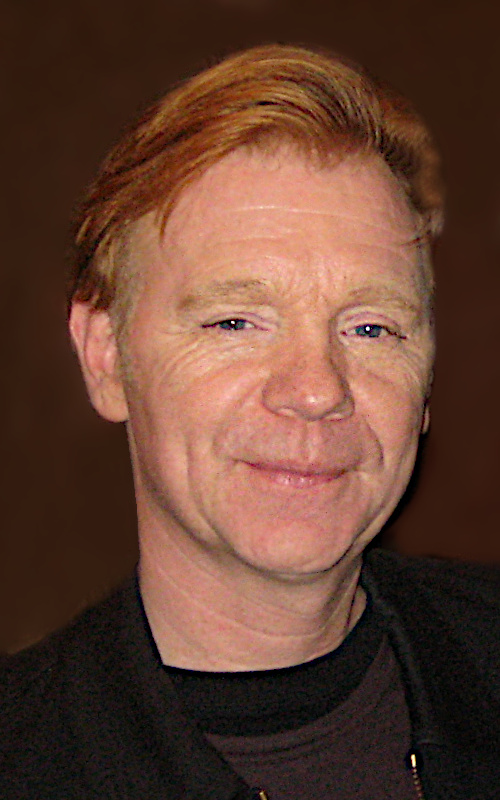
David Caruso

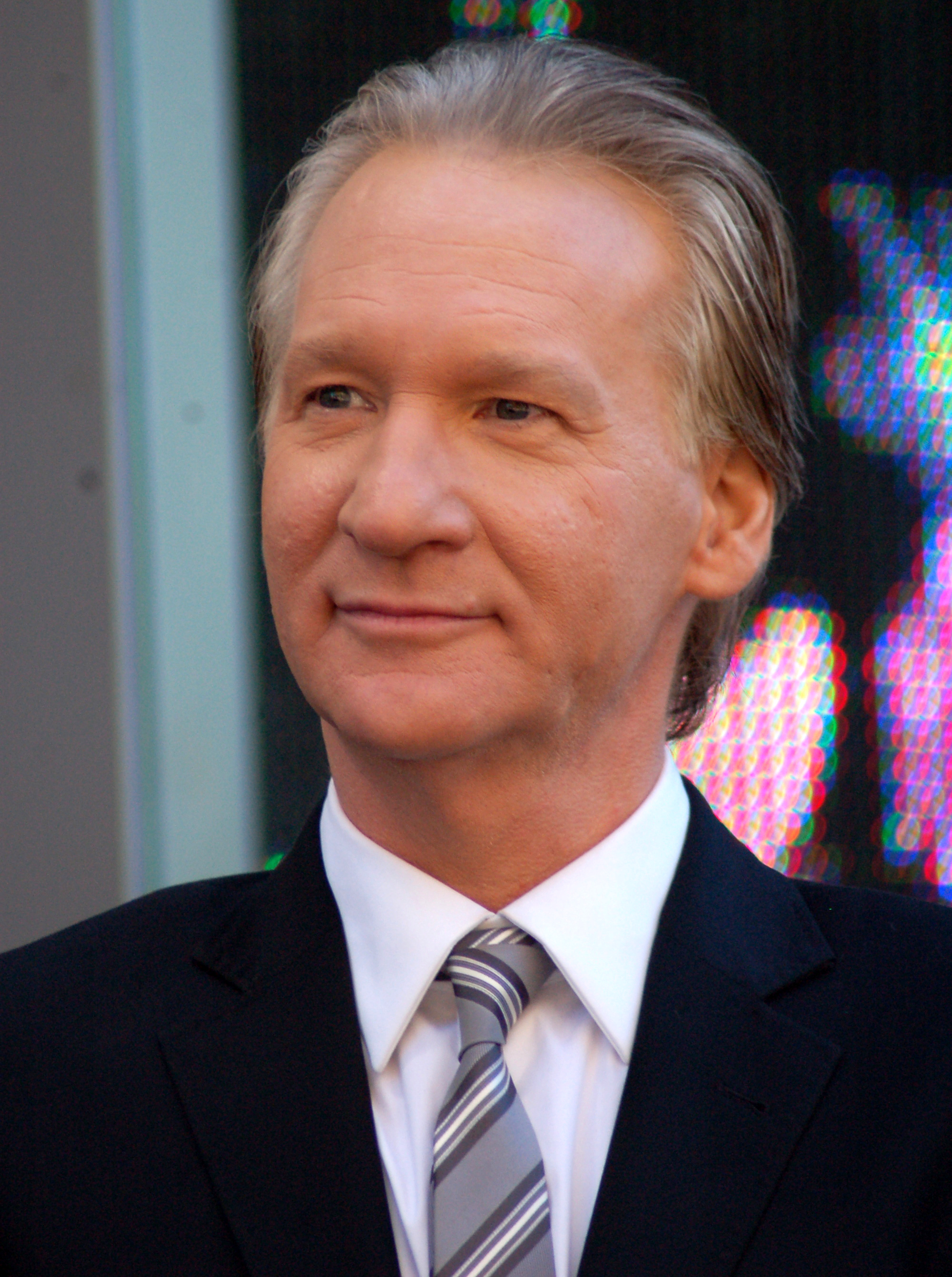
Bill Maher

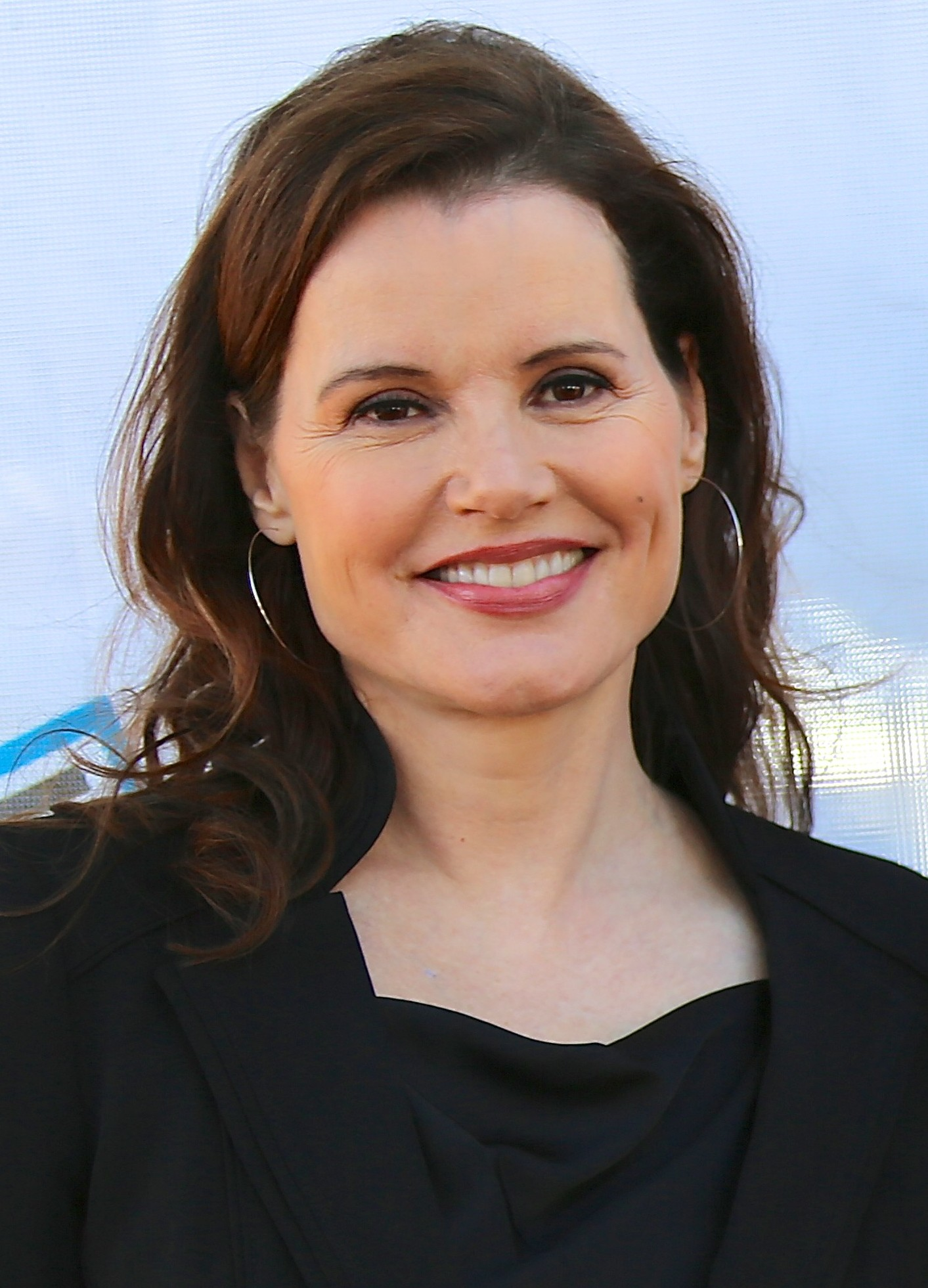
Geena Davis

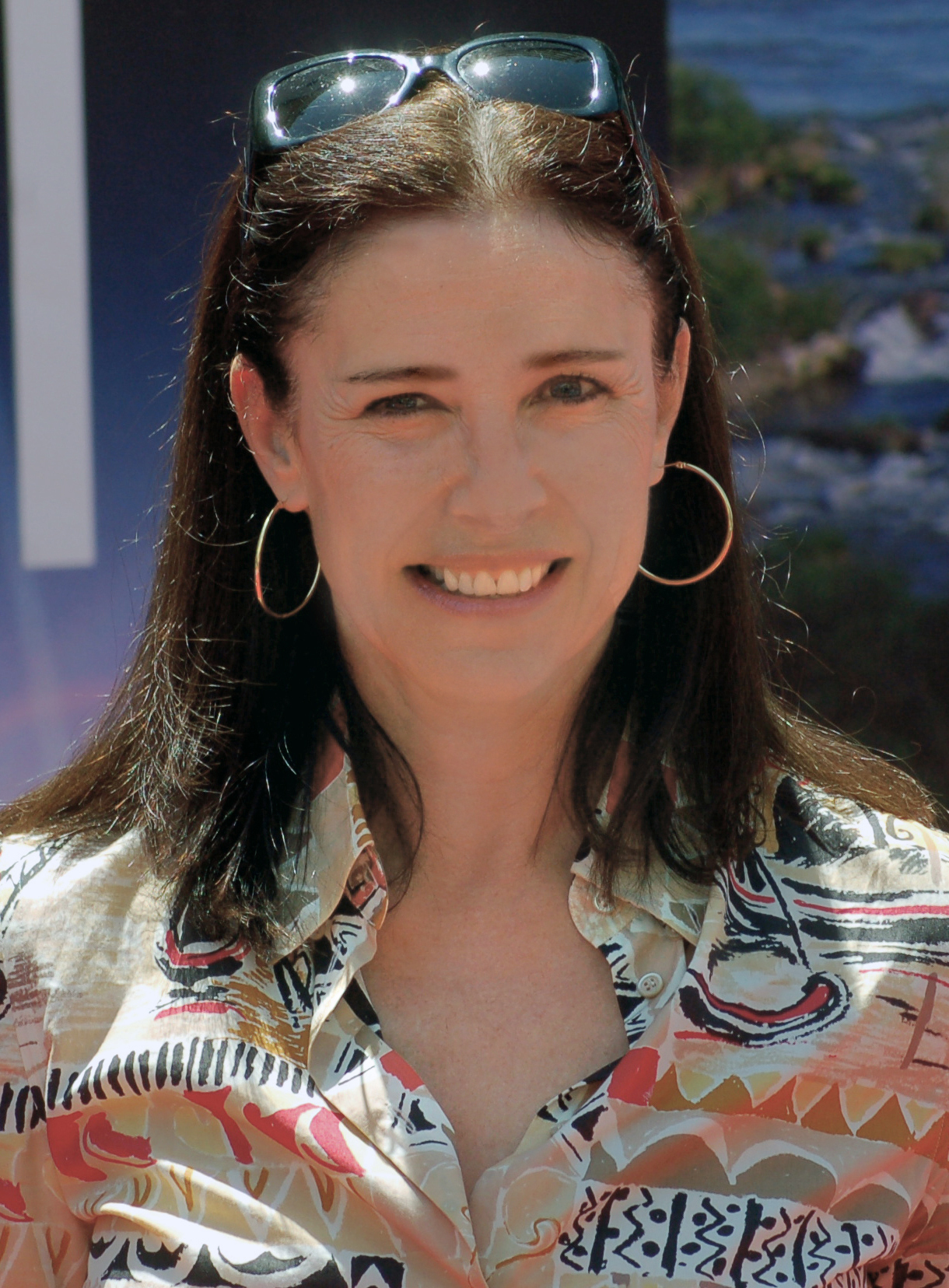
Mimi Rogers

- January 1
  - Mark R. Hughes, entrepreneur (d. 2000)
  - Mike Mitchell, basketball player (d. 2011)
- January 3 – Mel Gibson, actor and filmmaker
- January 7 – David Caruso, actor (NYPD Blue)
- January 9 – Kimberly Beck, actress
- January 10
  - Shawn Colvin, singer
  - George Merrill, singer-songwriter and keyboard player
- January 11
  - Big Bank Hank, rapper (d. 2014)
  - Robert Earl Keen, singer-songwriter and guitarist
- January 13 – Janet Hubert, African-American actress
- January 15 – Don Cooper, baseball player (d. 2026)
- January 18
  - Sharon Mitchell, American sexologist
  - Jim Mothersbaugh, American rock drummer
- January 19 – Carman, singer (d. 2021)
- January 20 – Bill Maher, actor, comedian and political analyst
- January 21
  - Robby Benson, actor, voice actor, director, singer and educator
  - Geena Davis, actress
- January 26 – Pat Musick, voice actress
- January 27
  - Susanne Blakeslee, actress
  - Mimi Rogers, actress
- January 29 – Irlene Mandrell, actress and singer

=== February ===
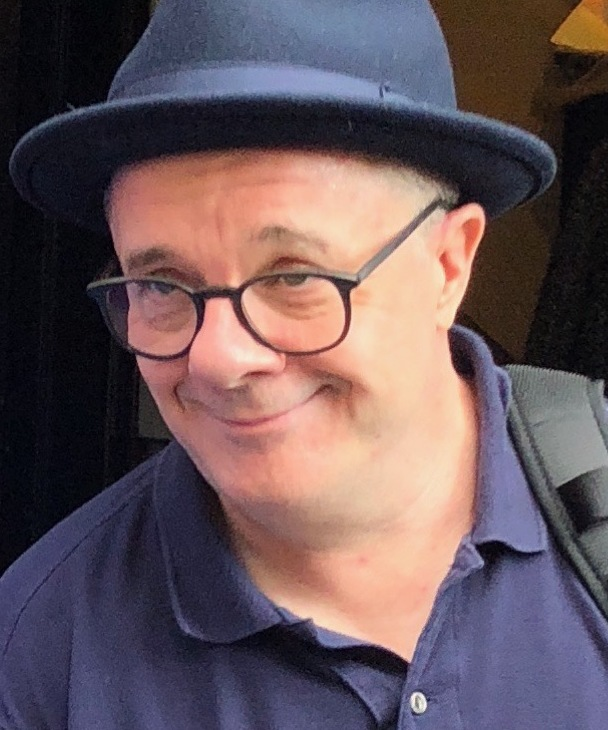
Nathan Lane

- February 3
  - Nathan Lane, actor (The Birdcage)
  - Lee Ranaldo, musician (Sonic Youth)
- February 6 – Terry Teachout, writer and director (died 2022)
- February 7
  - John Posey, actor
  - Mark St. John, American guitarist (died 2007)
- February 11 – Catherine Hickland, actress
- February 12 – Arsenio Hall, entertainer
- February 13 – Paul Stojanovich, television producer (died 2003)
- February 18 – Bruce Rauner, businessman, politician, philanthropist and the 42nd governor of Illinois
- February 19
  - Kathleen Beller, actress
  - Roderick MacKinnon, biologist, recipient of the Nobel Prize in Chemistry in 2003
- February 22 – Hugh Hewitt, lawyer, academic and radio host
- February 24
  - Howard Bragman, crisis management expert (died 2023)
  - Judith Butler, philosopher
  - Eddie Murray, baseball player
  - Paula Zahn, television journalist (CBS News)
- February 29
  - Aileen Wuornos, serial killer (d. 2002)
  - Mike Compton, mandolin player

=== March ===
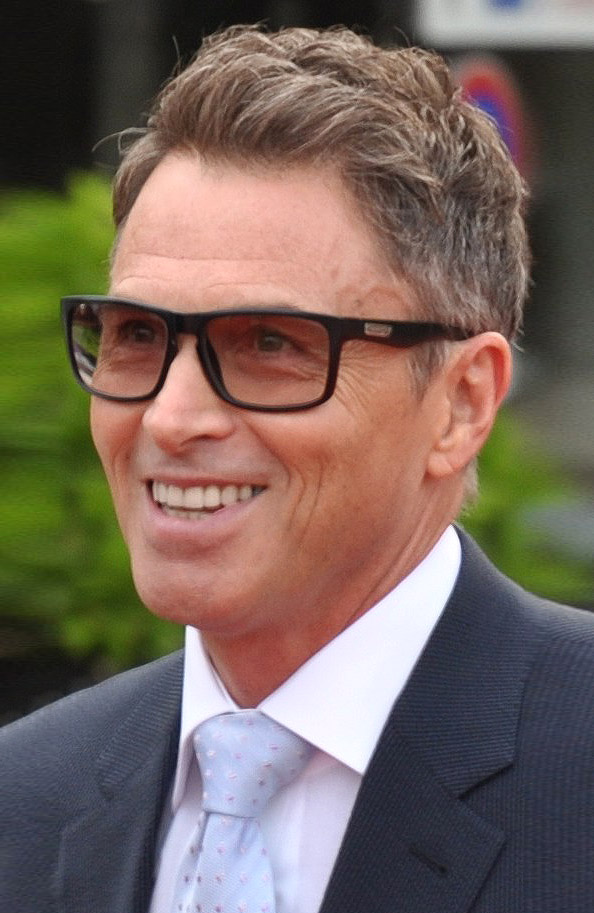
Tim Daly

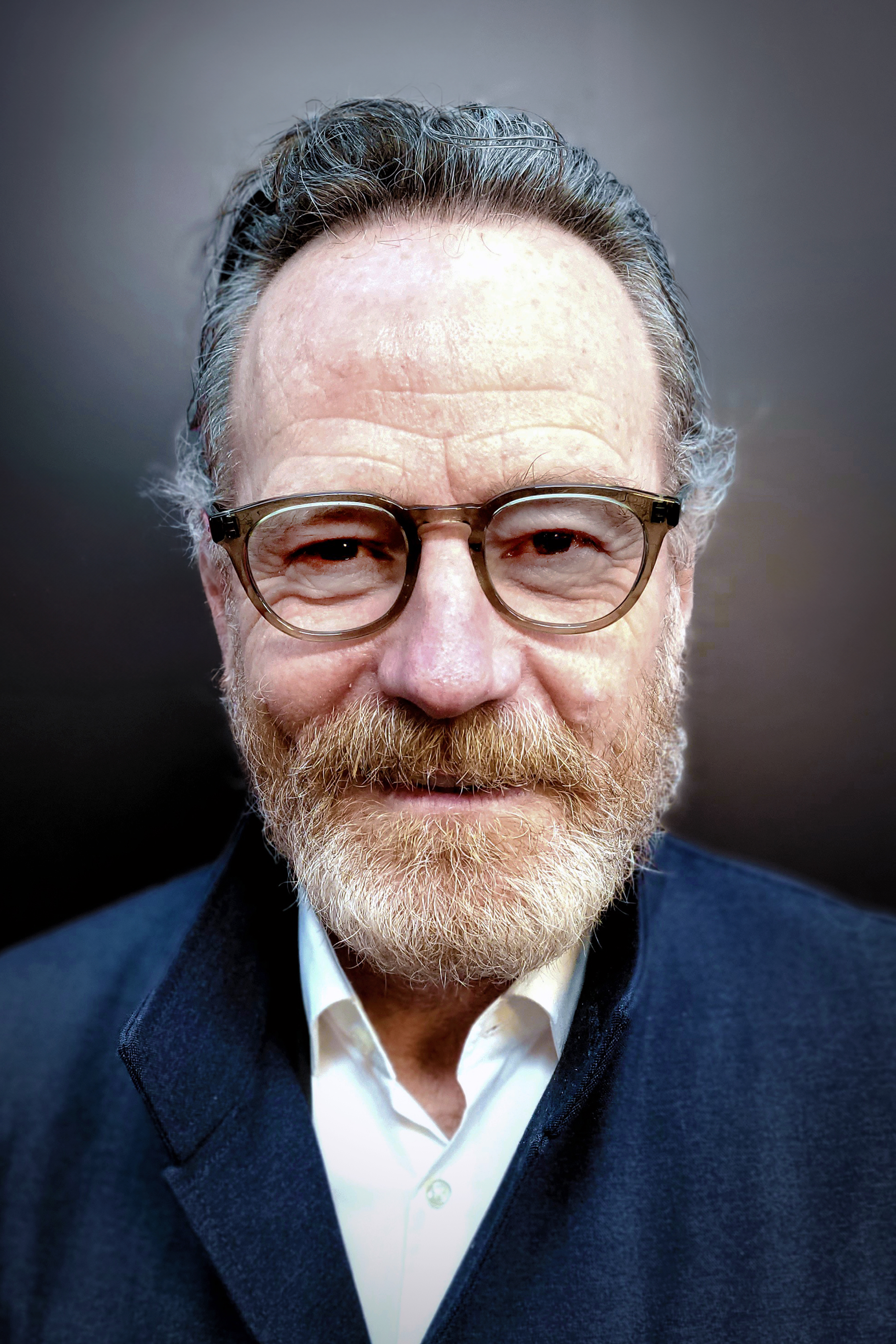
Bryan Cranston

- March 1 – Tim Daly, actor
- March 5 – Teena Marie, singer (d. 2010)
- March 7 – Bryan Cranston, actor
- March 11 – Rob Paulsen, voice actor
- March 12 – Dale Murphy, baseball player
- March 13
  - Dana Delany, actress
  - Jamie Dimon, CEO of JPMorgan Chase
- March 24 – Steve Ballmer, CEO of Microsoft
- March 28 – Susan Ershler, mountaineer
- March 30 – Paul Reiser, comedian and actor

=== April ===
- April 1 – Jeffrey Beecroft, production designer and art director
- April 3 – Ray Combs, game show host and comedian (d. 1996)
- April 4 – David E. Kelley, writer and television producer
- April 5 – Diamond Dallas Page, professional wrestler
- April 6 – Michele Bachmann, politician
- April 7 – Christopher Darden, lawyer
- April 14 – Barbara Bonney, soprano
- April 16 – David M. Brown, astronaut (Space Shuttle Columbia disaster) (d. 2003)
- April 18
  - John James, actor (Dynasty)
  - Melody Thomas Scott, actress
  - Eric Roberts, American actor
- April 21 – Phillip Longman, demographer
- April 23 - Greg Colson, American artist
- April 27 – Bryan Harvey, American musician (d. 2006)

=== May ===
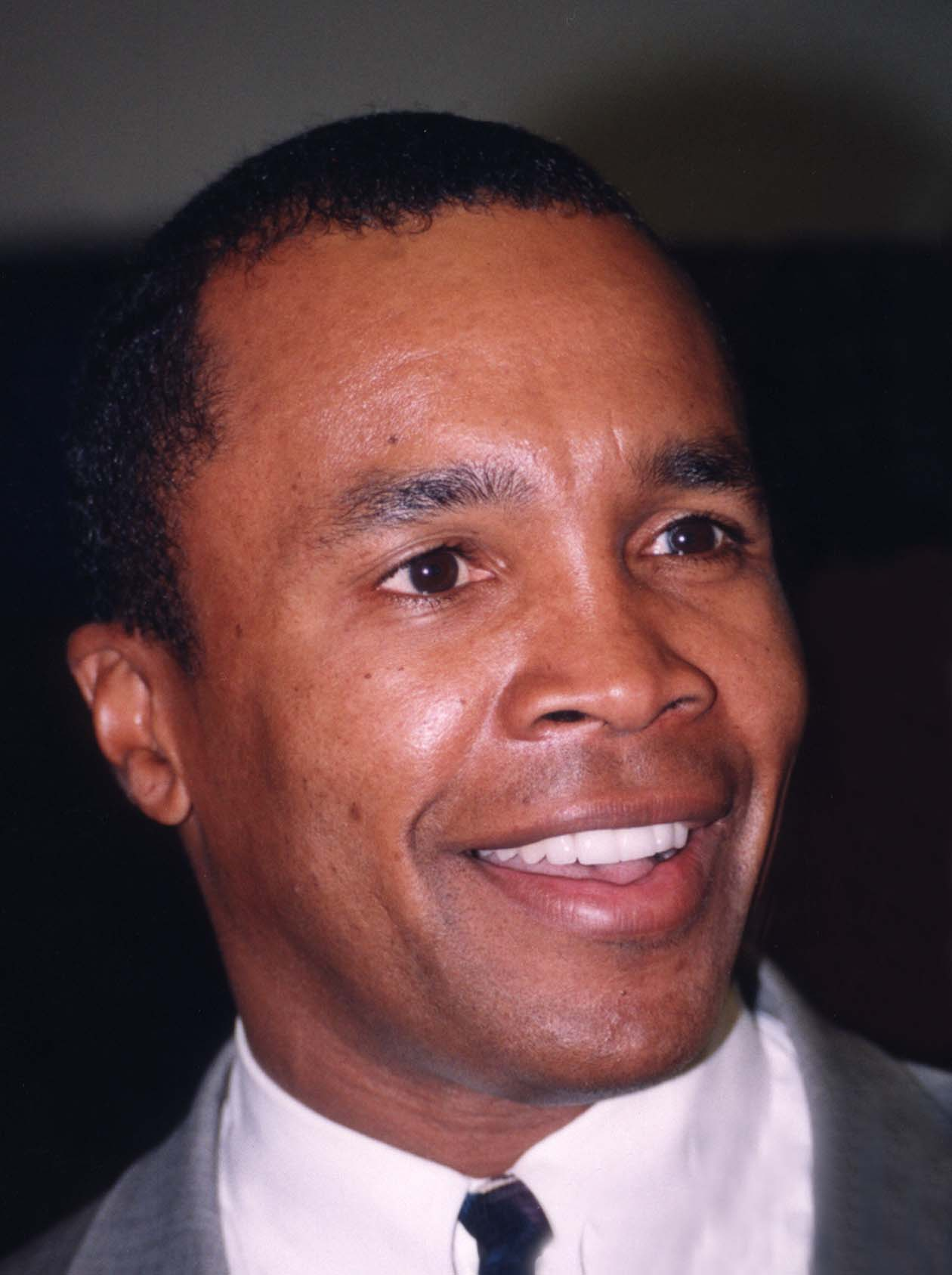
Sugar Ray Leonard

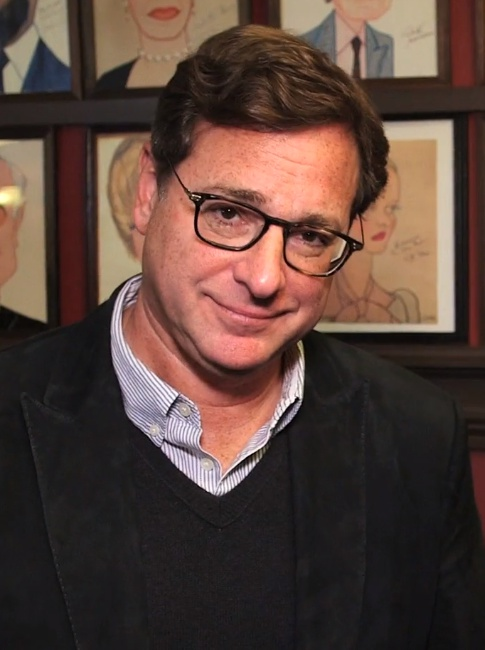
Bob Saget

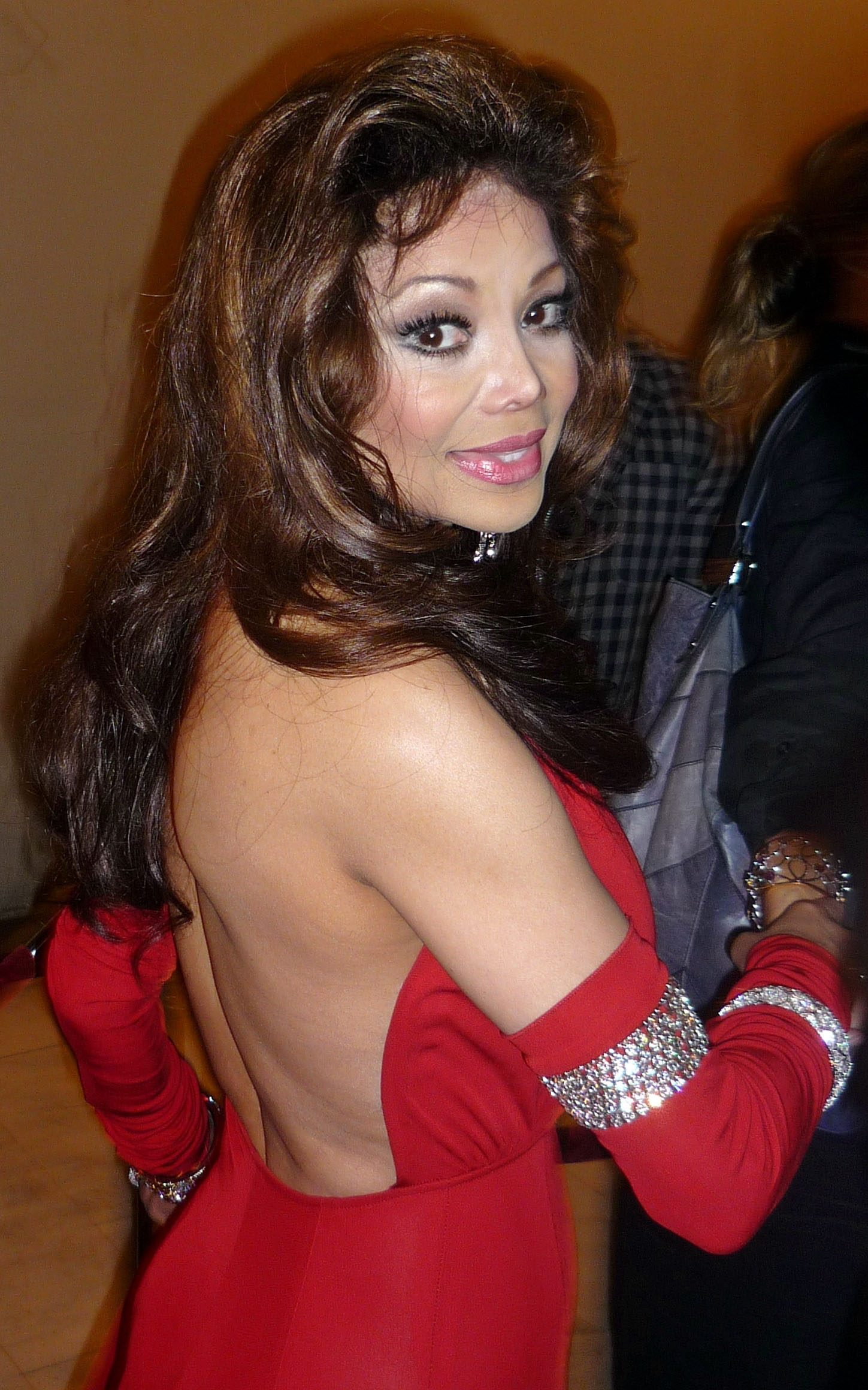
La Toya Jackson

- May 4 – David Guterson, writer
- May 5 – Lisa Eilbacher, actress
- May 6 – Cindy Lovell, educator and writer
- May 7
  - S. Scott Bullock, actor and voice actor
  - Todd Haimes, artistic director (d. 2023)
- May 10 – Paige O'Hara, actress, voice actress, singer and painter
- May 12 – Greg Phillinganes, keyboardist
- May 15 – Dan Patrick, sports commentator
- May 17
  - Sugar Ray Leonard, boxer
  - Bob Saget, actor, comedian and television host (d. 2022)
- May 19 – Steven Ford, actor
- May 20 – Dean Butler, actor and producer
- May 23 – Buck Showalter, baseball player and manager
- May 26 – Lisa Niemi, actress and dancer, spouse of Patrick Swayze
- May 28 – Jerry Douglas, dobro player
- May 29 – La Toya Jackson, singer

=== June ===
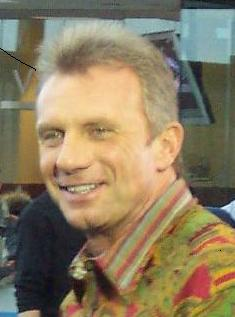
Joe Montana

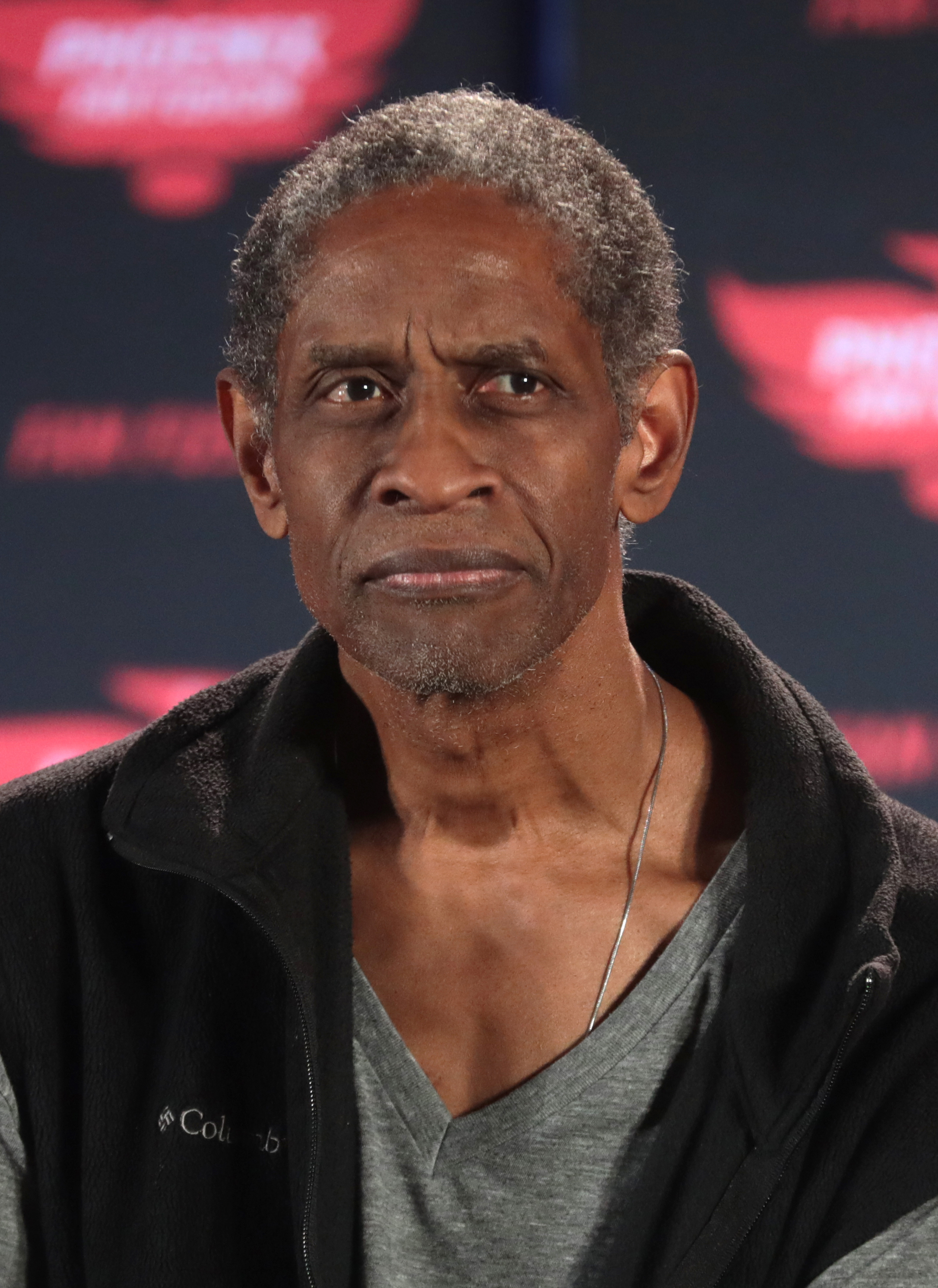
Tim Russ

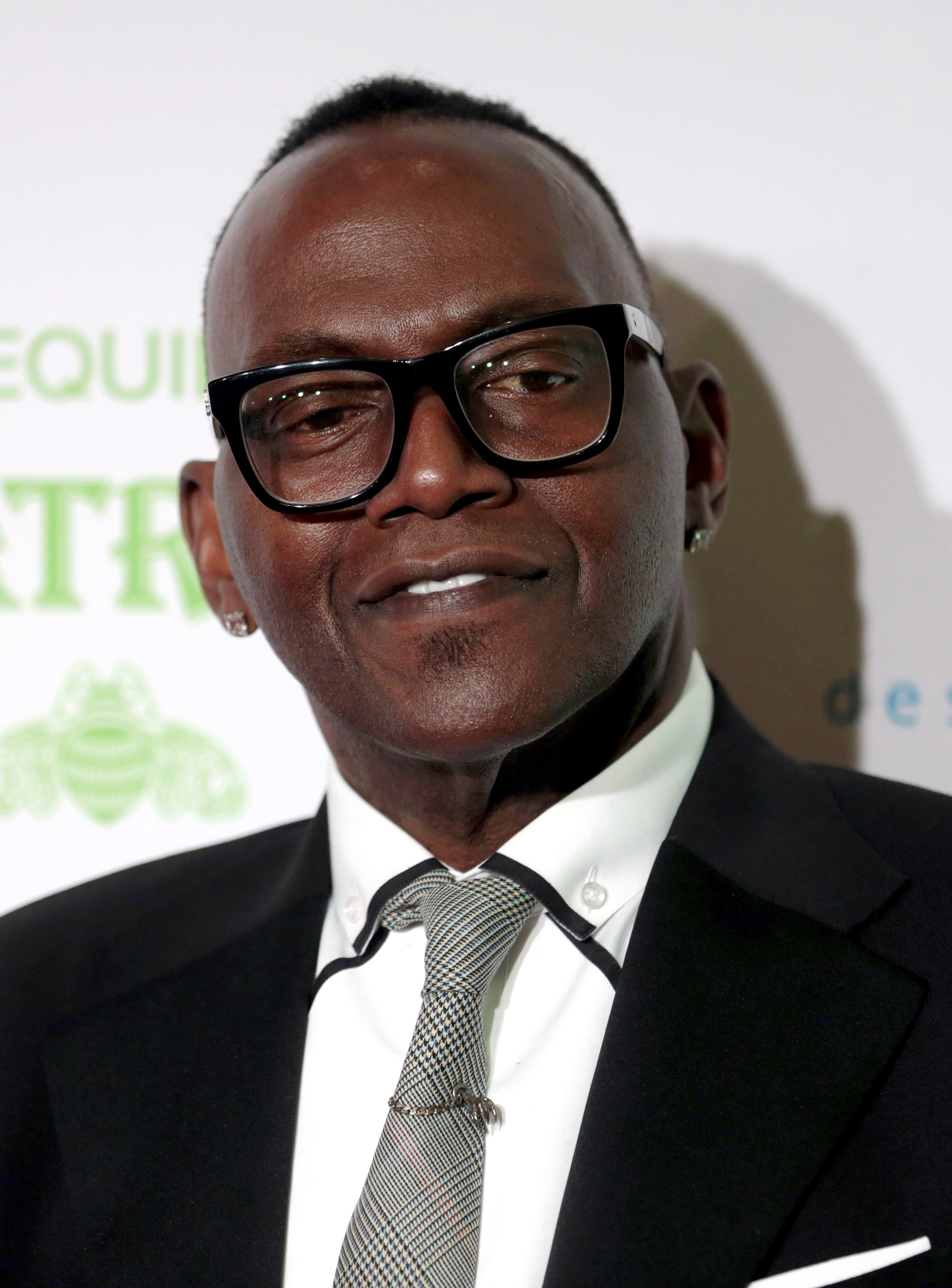
Randy Jackson

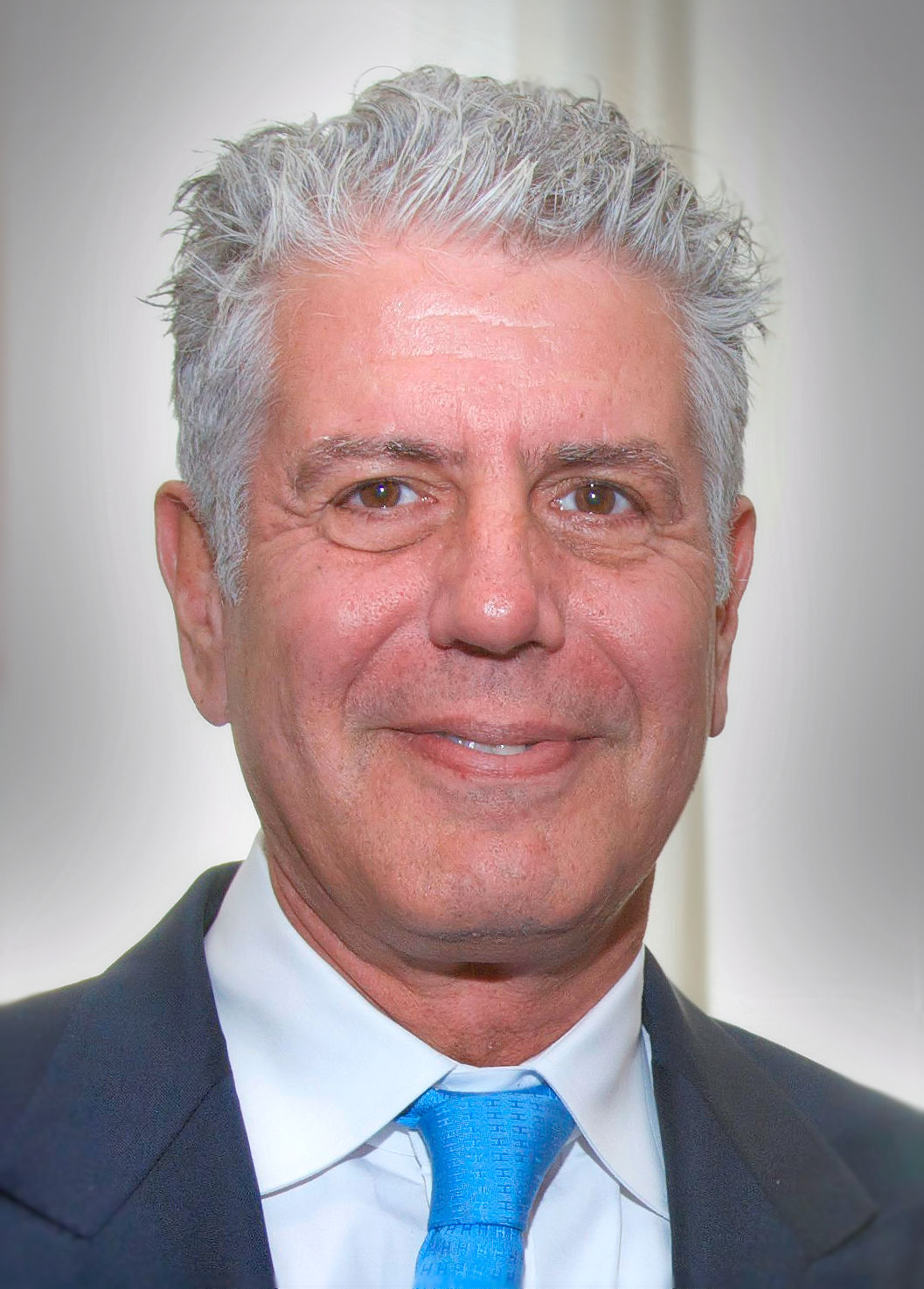
Anthony Bourdain

- June 1 – Lisa Hartman Black, actress, singer
- June 3
  - Brad Nessler, sportscaster
  - Danny Wilde, singer-songwriter and guitarist
- June 4 – Keith David, actor
- June 5 – Kenny G, grammy-award-winning saxophonist
- June 7 – L.A. Reid, record executive
- June 9 – Patricia Cornwell, novelist
- June 11
  - Joe Montana, football player
  - Jamaaladeen Tacuma, jazz bassist and bandleader
- June 14 – Fred Funk, golfer and coach
- June 15 – Robin Curtis, actress
- June 17 – Kelly Curtis, actor
- June 19 – Danny Chauncey, guitarist
- June 21 – Thomas James O'Leary, American actor
- June 22 – Tim Russ, actor, film director, screenwriter and musician
- June 23 – Randy Jackson, musician and talent judge
- June 25 – Anthony Bourdain, chef, author and television personality (died 2018)
- June 26 – Chris Isaak, musician
- June 30
  - David Alan Grier, actor, comedian
  - Ronald Winans, musician (d. 2005)

=== July ===
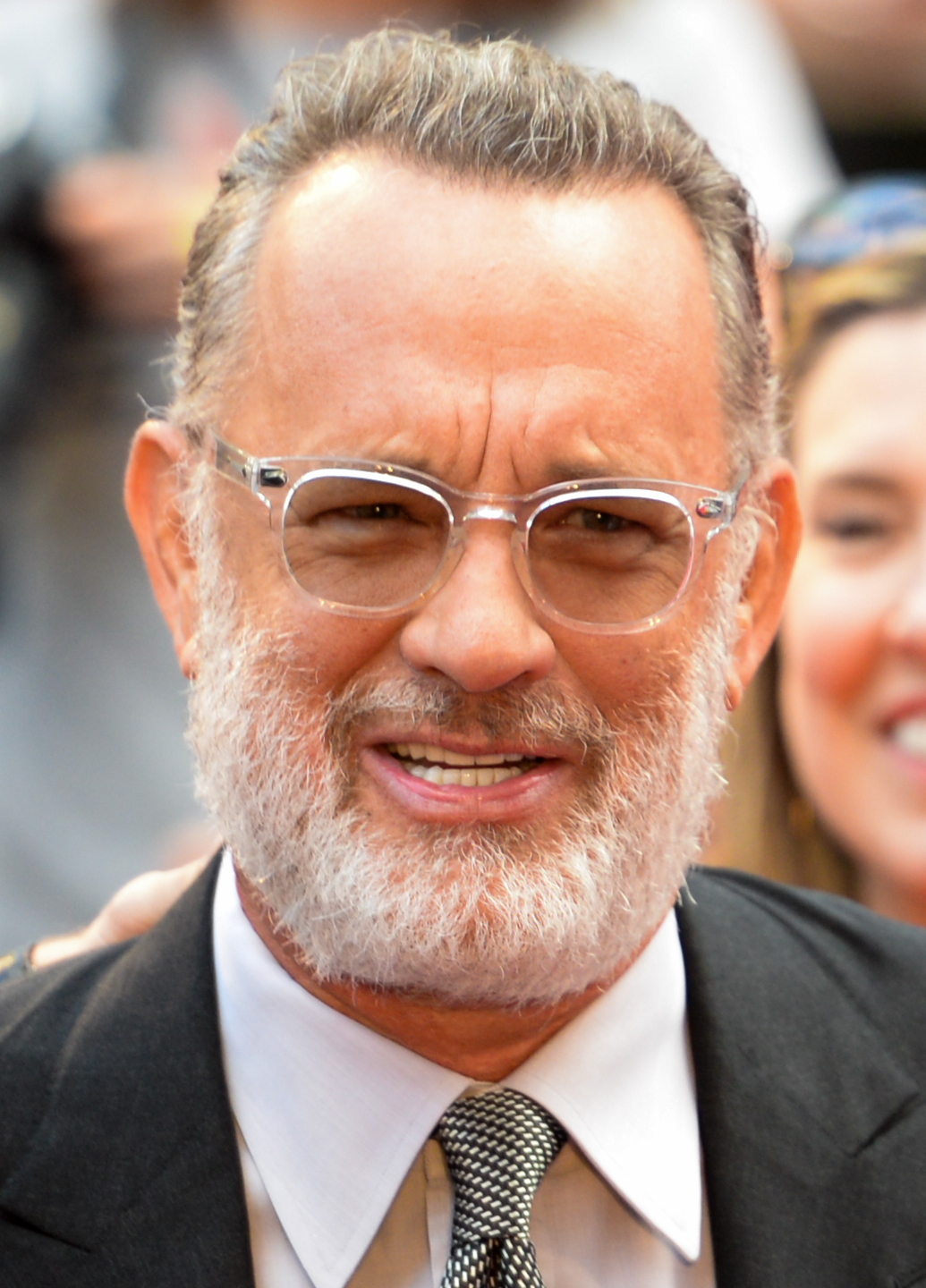
Tom Hanks

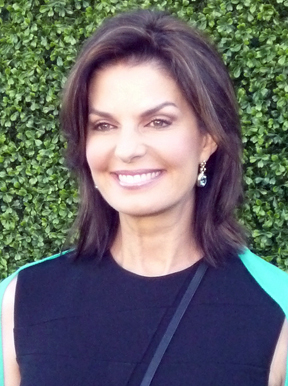
Sela Ward

- July 1 – Alan Ruck, actor
- July 2 – Jerry Hall, model and actress
- July 5 – Louis Herthum, actor and producer
- July 9 – Tom Hanks, actor and director
- July 11 – Sela Ward, actress
- July 12
  - Mel Harris, actress
  - Sandi Patty, gospel singer
  - Gregg L. Semenza, cellular biologist, recipient of the Nobel Prize in Physiology or Medicine in 2019
- July 13 – Michael Spinks, African-American boxer
- July 16 – Tony Kushner, playwright
- July 18
  - Sheila Aldridge, singer (The Aldridge Sisters)
  - Razor Shines, baseball player, manager and coach
- July 24
  - Charlie Crist, politician
  - Pat Finn, game show host and producer
- July 25 – Frances Arnold, biochemist, recipient of the Nobel Prize in Chemistry in 2018
- July 30 – Delta Burke, actress
- July 31
  - Michael Biehn, actor
  - Lynja, celebrity chef (d. 2024)
  - Deval Patrick, 71st Governor of Massachusetts

=== August ===
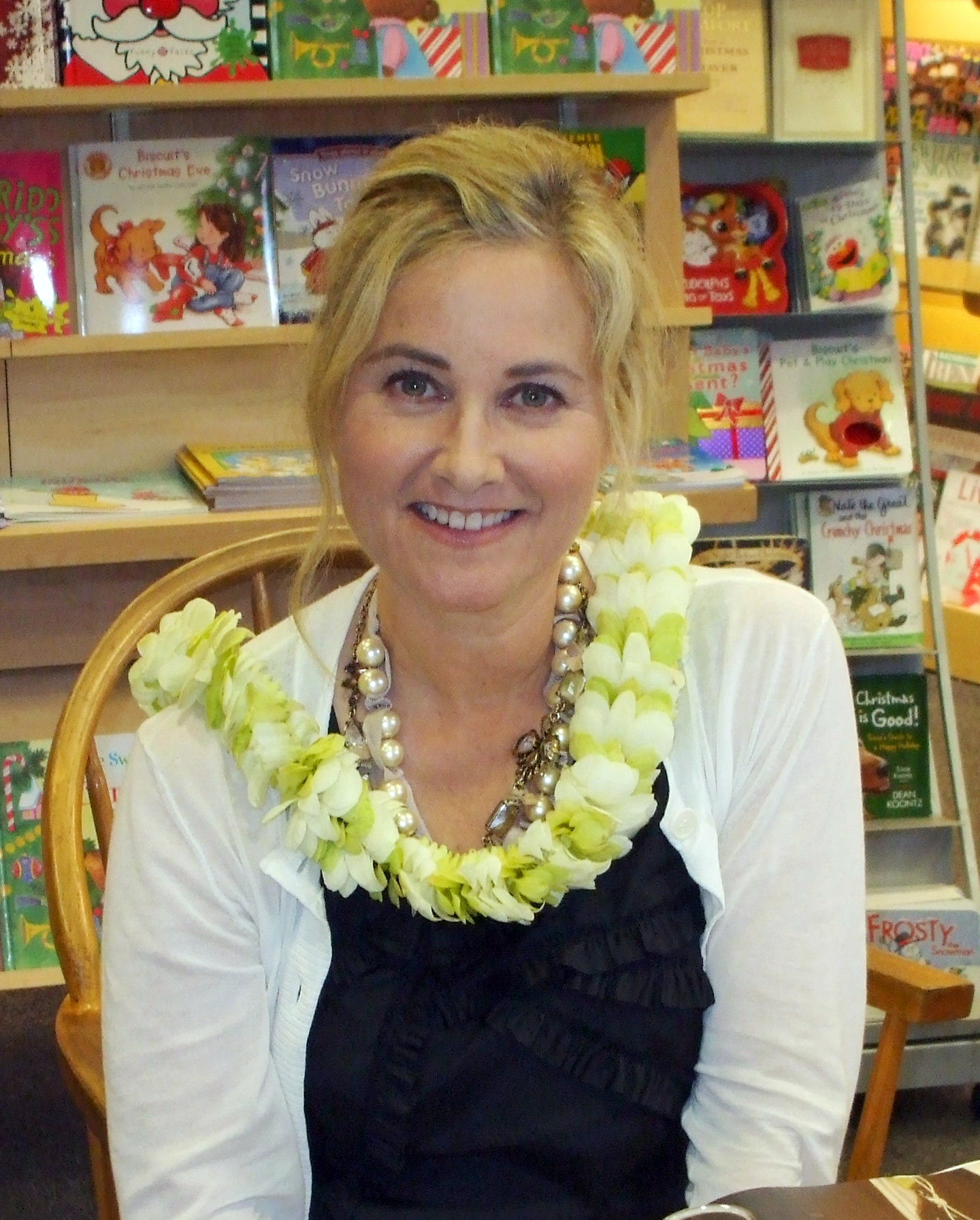
Maureen McCormick

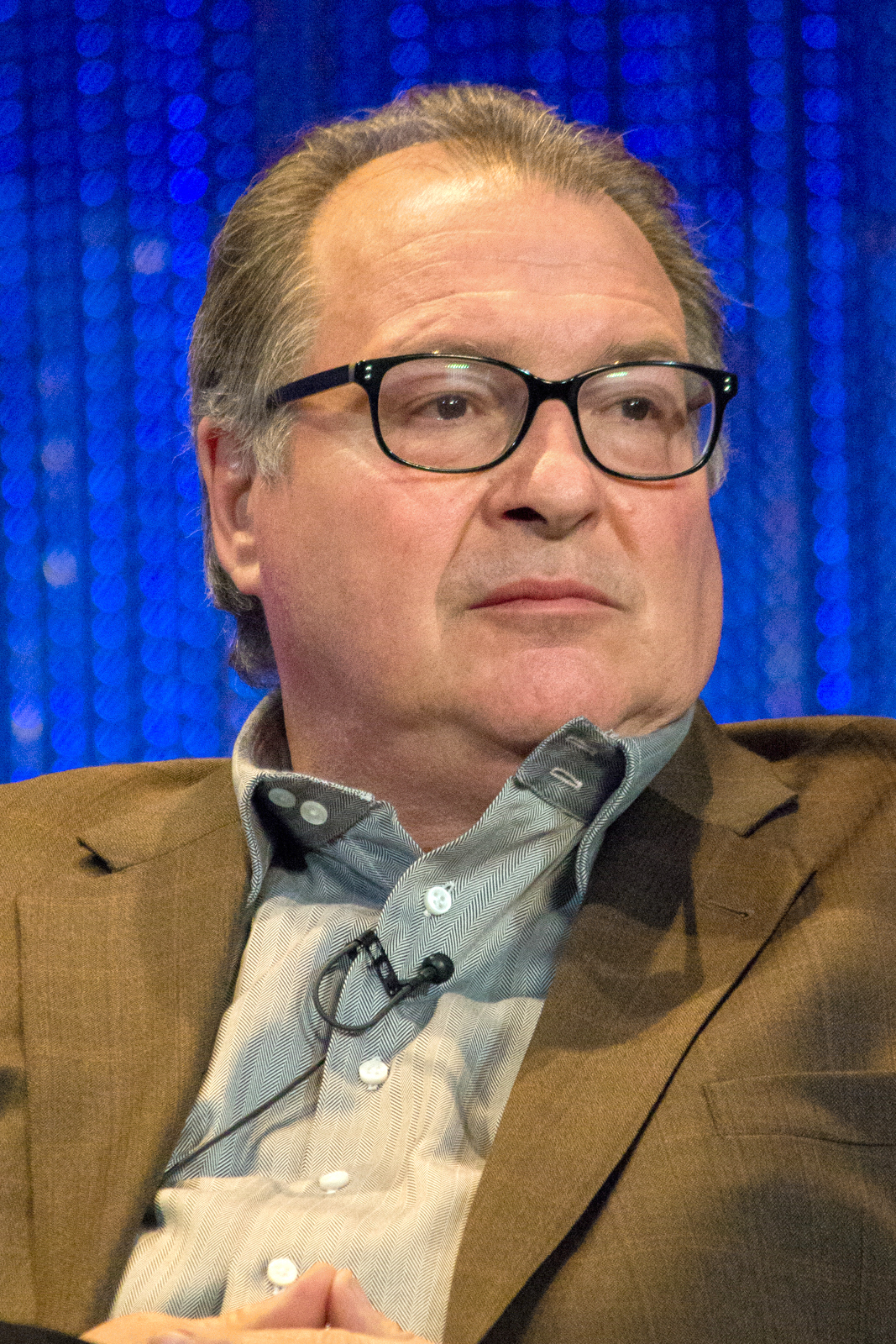
Kevin Dunn

- August 1 – Steve Green, Christian musician
- August 4 – Gerry Cooney, boxer
- August 5 – Maureen McCormick, actress (The Brady Bunch)
- August 6 – Stepfanie Kramer, actress (Hunter)
- August 10
  - Fred Ottman, professional wrestler
  - Charlie Peacock, Christian producer, singer-songwriter
- August 11 – Richie Ramone, rock drummer
- August 14 – Jackée Harry, actress and television personality
- August 18
  - Jon "Bermuda" Schwartz, drummer
  - Kelly Willard, Christian singer
- August 19 – Adam Arkin, actor
- August 20 – Joan Allen, actress
- August 21 – Jon Tester, U.S. Senator from Montana from 2007 to 2025
- August 22 – Paul Molitor, baseball player
- August 24
  - John Culberson, politician
  - Kevin Dunn, actor
- August 26 – Mark Mangino, football coach
- August 29
  - GG Allin, punk musician (d. 1993)
  - Mark Morris, choreographer

=== September ===
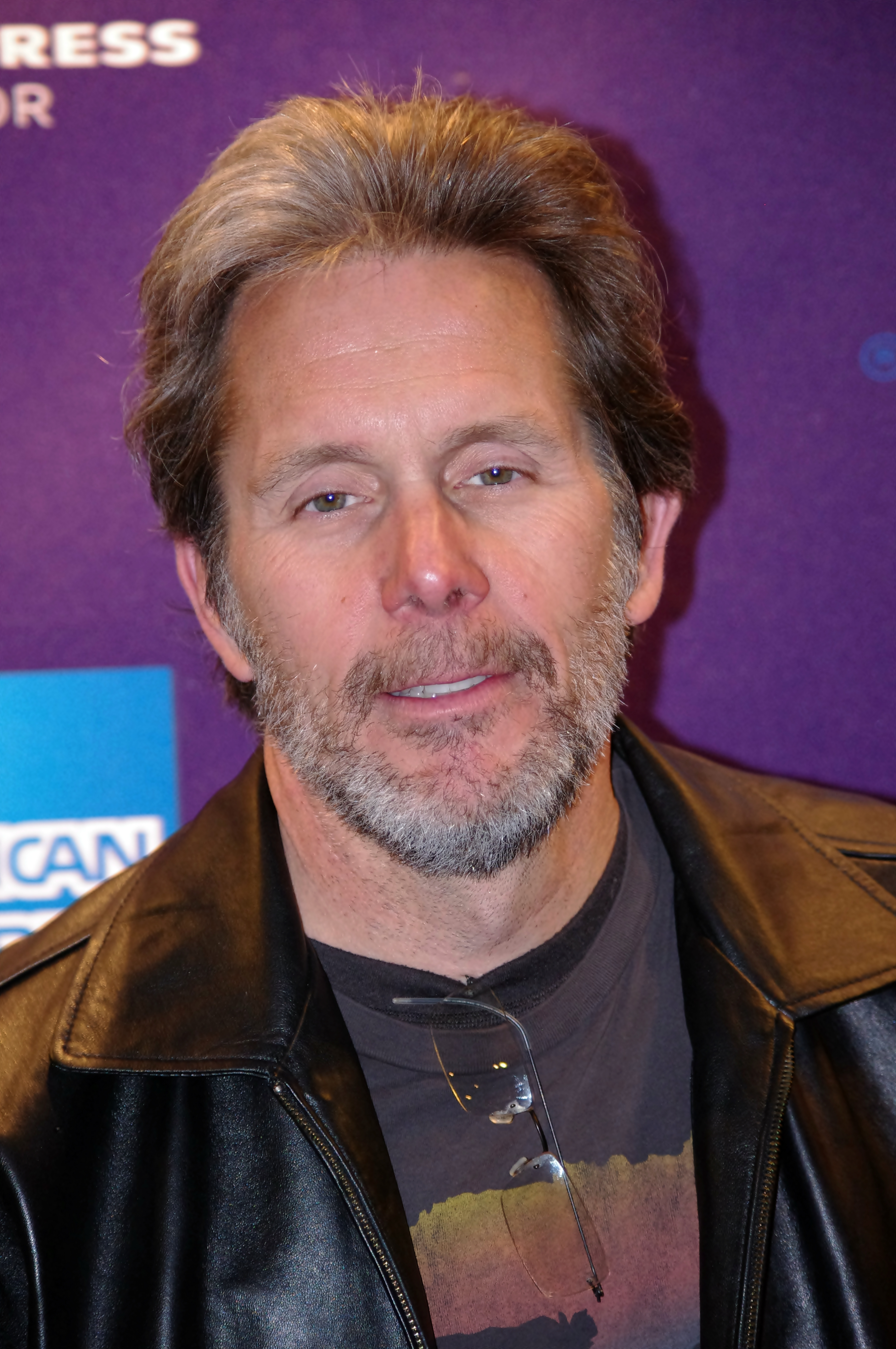
Gary Cole

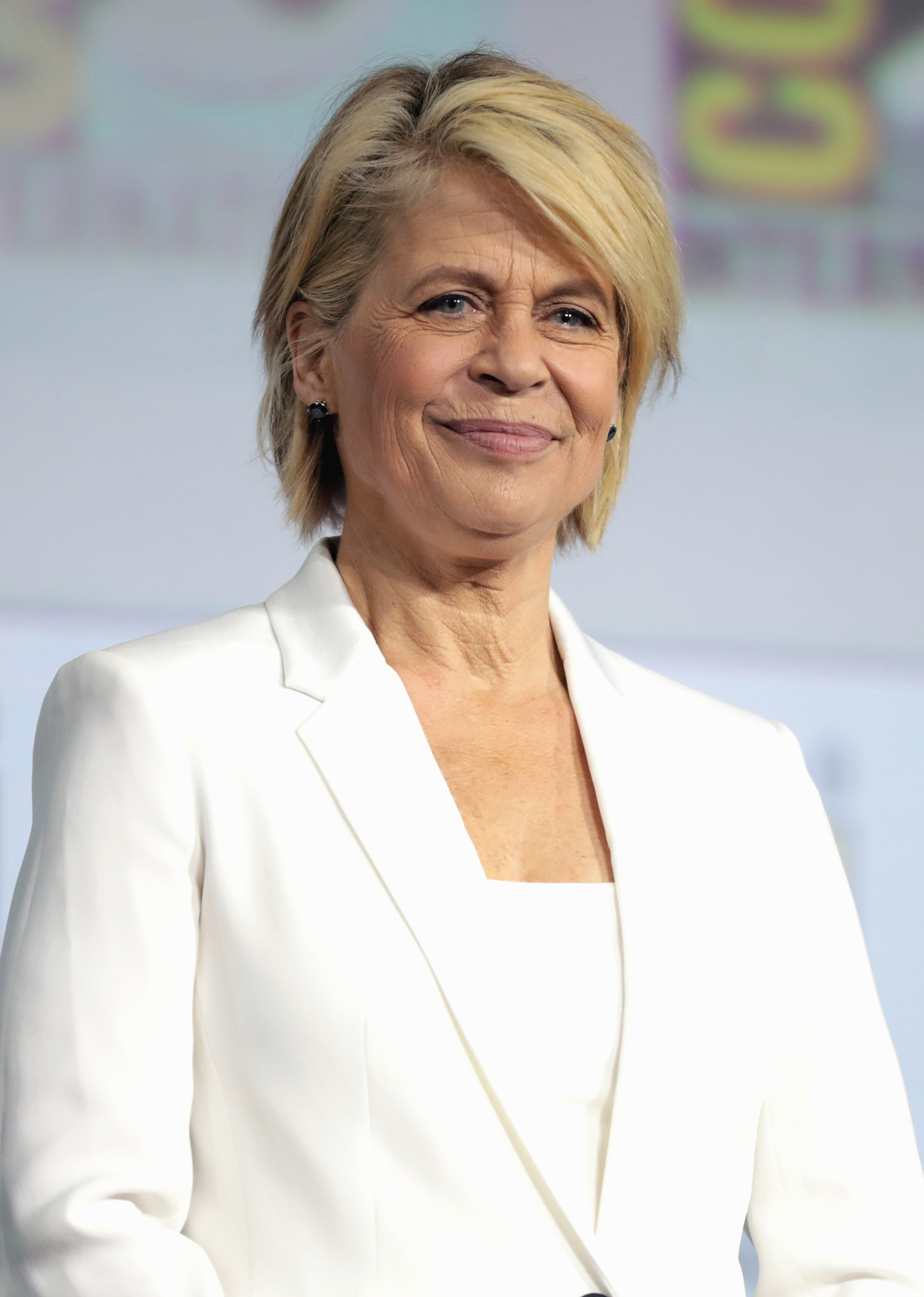
Linda Hamilton

- September 1 – Bernie Wagenblast, editor and broadcaster
- September 6 – Bill Ritter, 41st Governor of Colorado
- September 7 – Michael Feinstein, singer and pianist
- September 8 – Maurice Cheeks, basketball player and coach
- September 11 – Phillip D. Bissett, politician
- September 12
  - Chip Beck, golfer
  - Sam Brownback, U.S. Senator from Kansas from 1996 to 2011
  - Ricky Rudd, race car driver
- September 15
  - Rick Garcia, LGBT activist (d. 2026)
  - George Howard, jazz saxophonist (d. 1998)
- September 16 – David Copperfield, illusionist
- September 17 – Brian Andreas, writer, sculptor, painter and publisher
- September 20
  - Gary Cole, actor
  - Debbi Morgan, actress
- September 21 – Jack Givens, basketball player
- September 23 – Peter David, writer (d. 2025)
- September 25 – Jamie Hyneman, television co-host (MythBusters)
- September 26 – Linda Hamilton, actress (The Terminator)
- September 30 – Carol Jenkins Barnett, businesswoman and philanthropist (d. 2021)

=== October ===
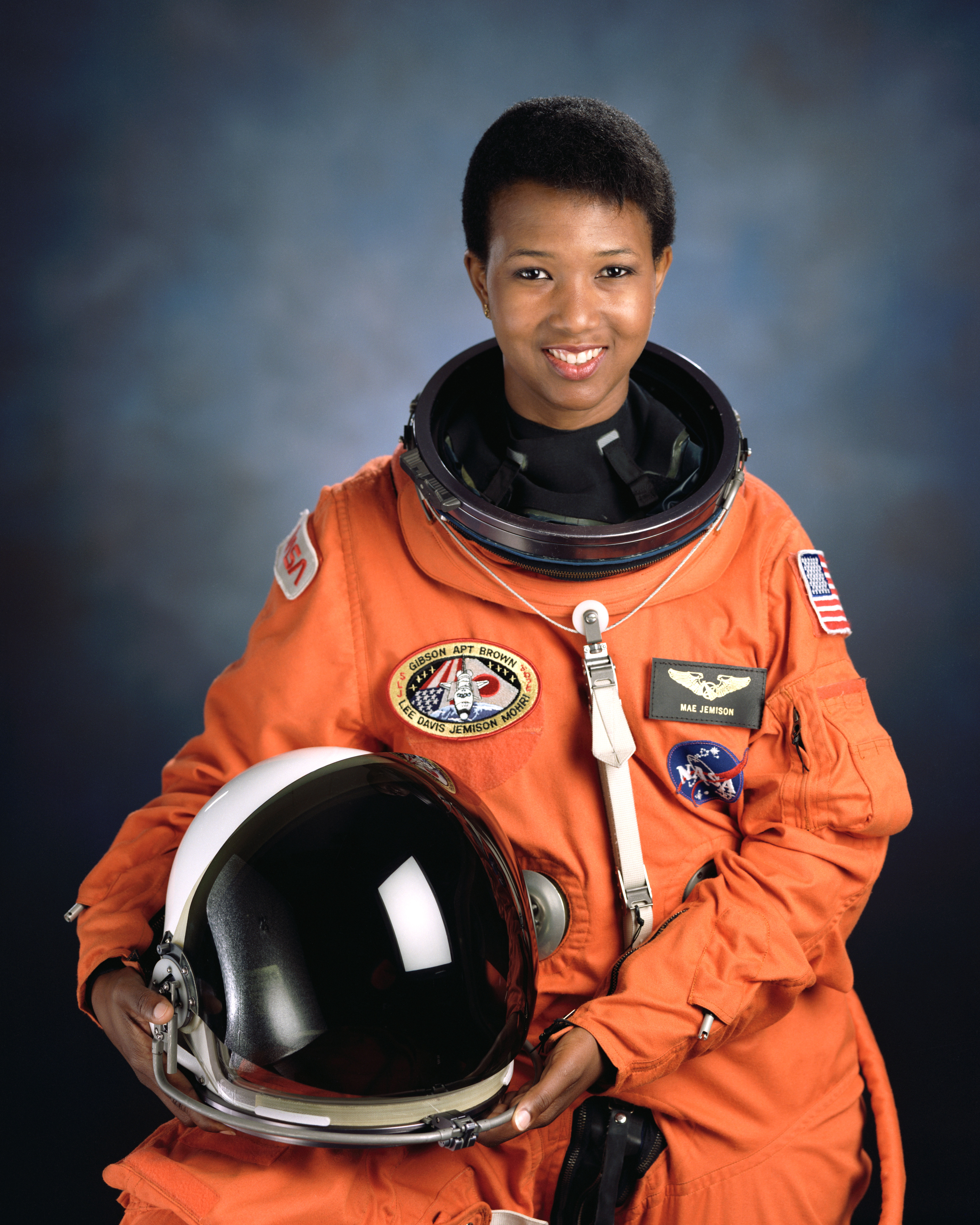
Mae Jemison

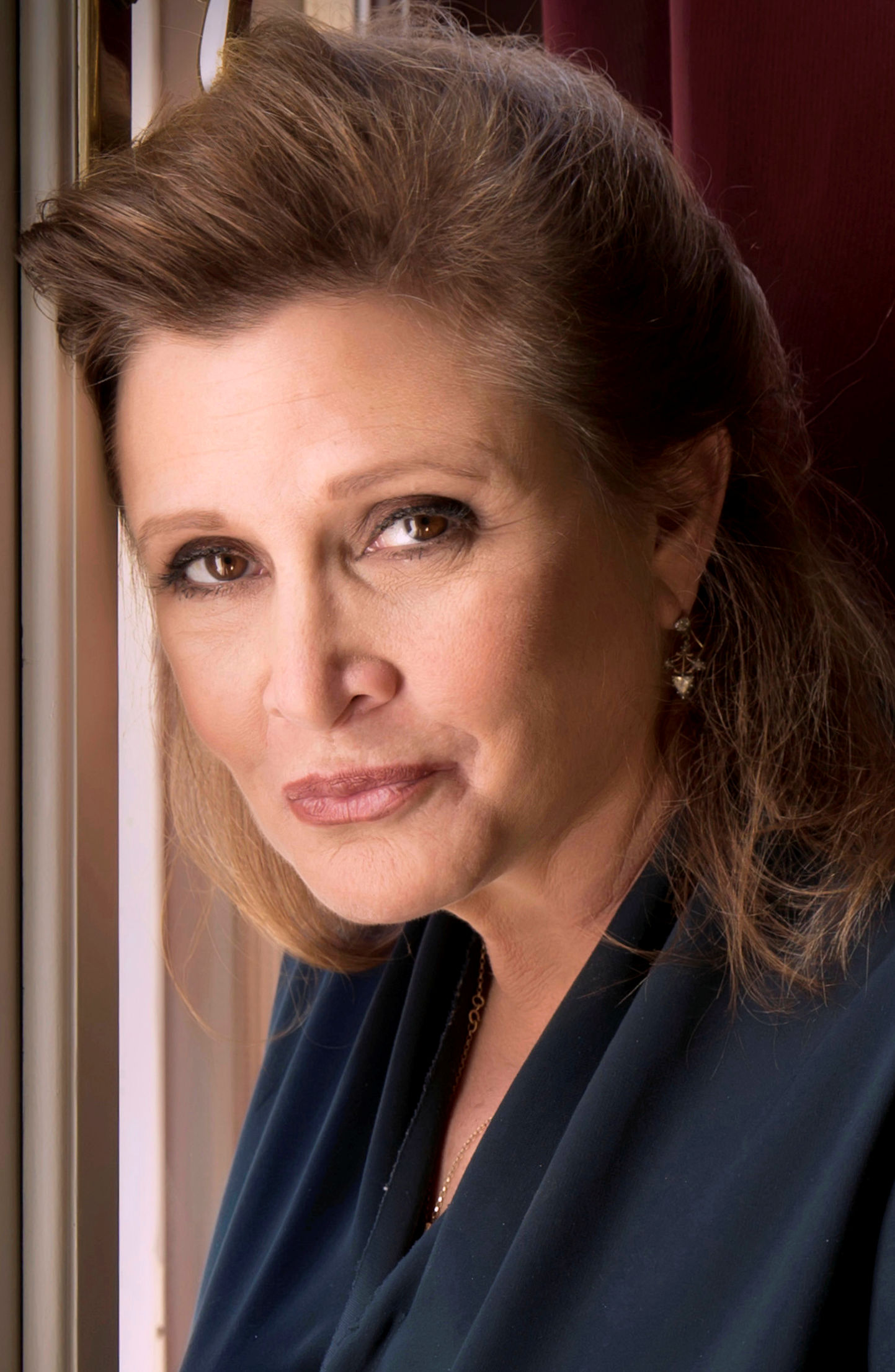
Carrie Fisher

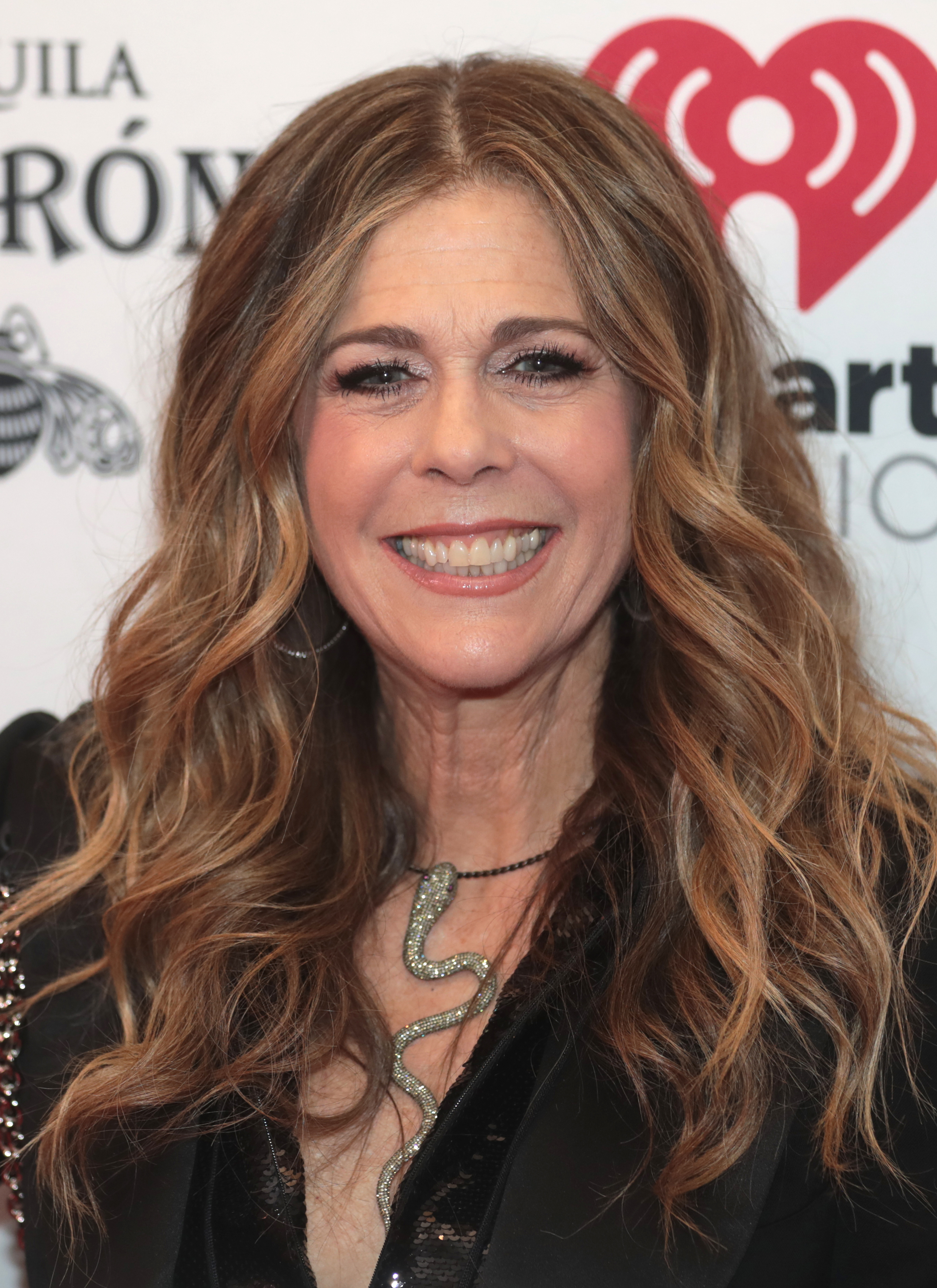
Rita Wilson

- October 5 – John McCullough, basketball player and coach
- October 8 – Stephanie Zimbalist, actress (Remington Steele)
- October 13
  - Chris Carter, director, producer, and screenwriter
  - Don Paige, runner
- October 16 – Marin Alsop, orchestral conductor
- October 17
  - Mae Jemison, astronaut
  - Stephen Palumbi, American academic and author
  - Ken Morrow, American ice hockey player
- October 18
  - Jim Talent, U.S. Senator from Missouri
  - Craig Bartlett, Animator, writer, storyboard artist, director and voice actor
- October 21 – Carrie Fisher, actress (Star Wars) (d. 2016)
- October 22 – Frank DiPino, baseball player and coach
- October 23
  - Darrell Pace, archer
  - Dwight Yoakam, country singer, musician and actor
- October 24
  - Dale Maharidge, journalist and author
  - Jeff Merkley, U.S. Senator from Oregon
  - David Stergakos, American-Greek basketball player
- October 26 – Rita Wilson, actress and producer
- October 28 – Dave Wyndorf, singer-songwriter and guitarist

=== November ===
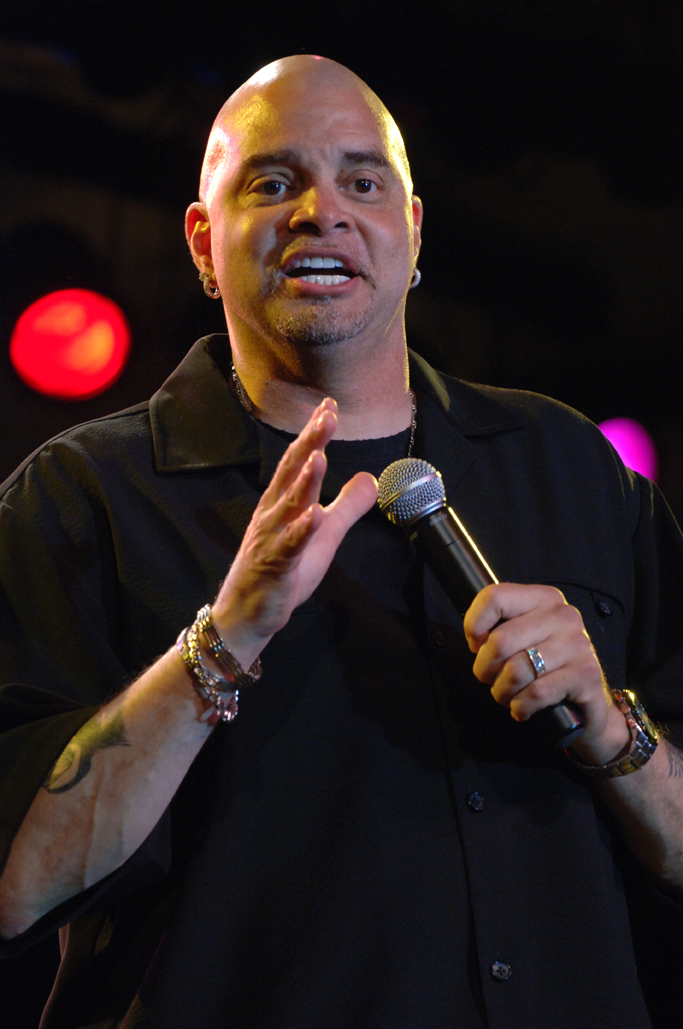
Sinbad

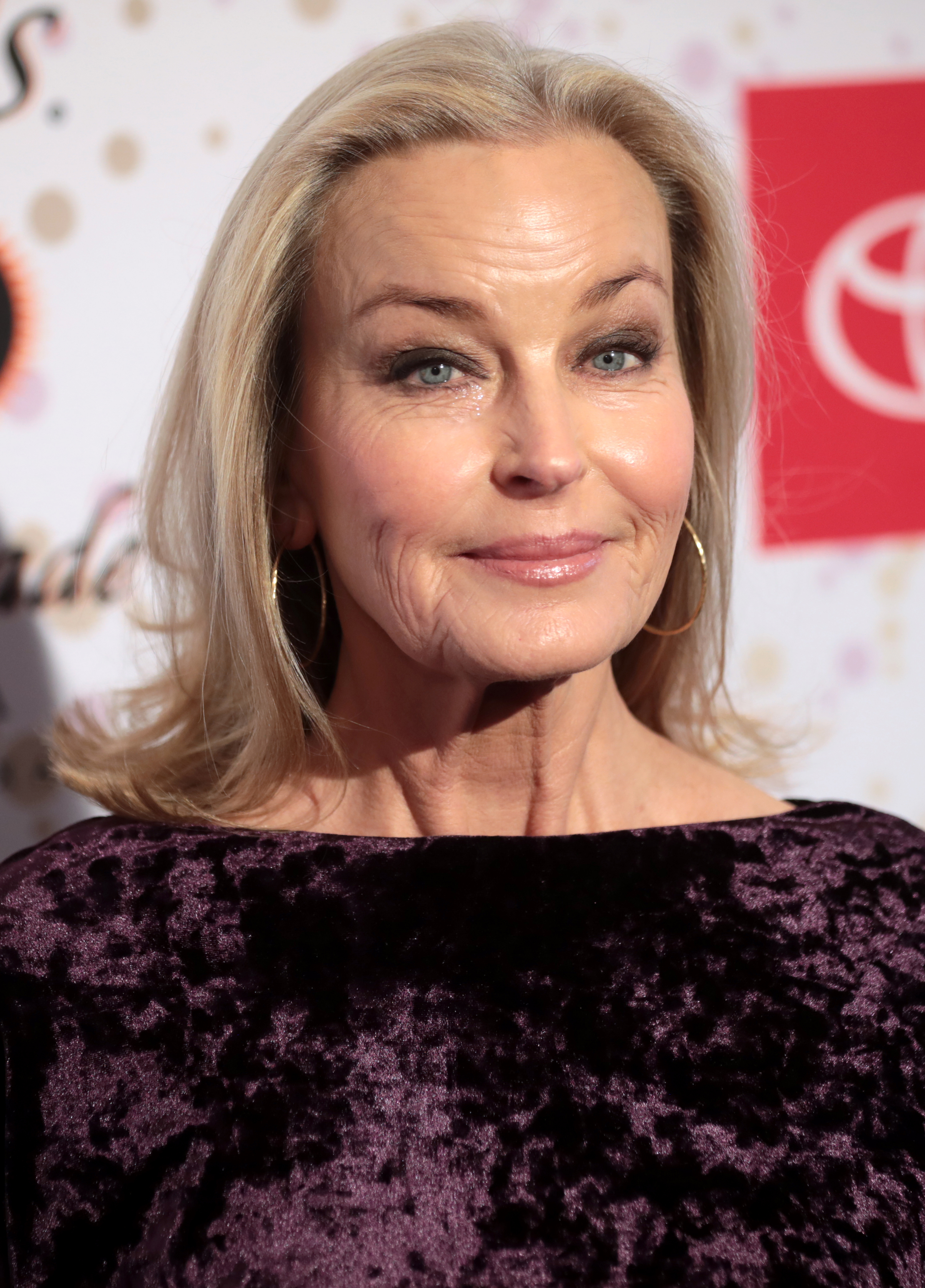
Bo Derek

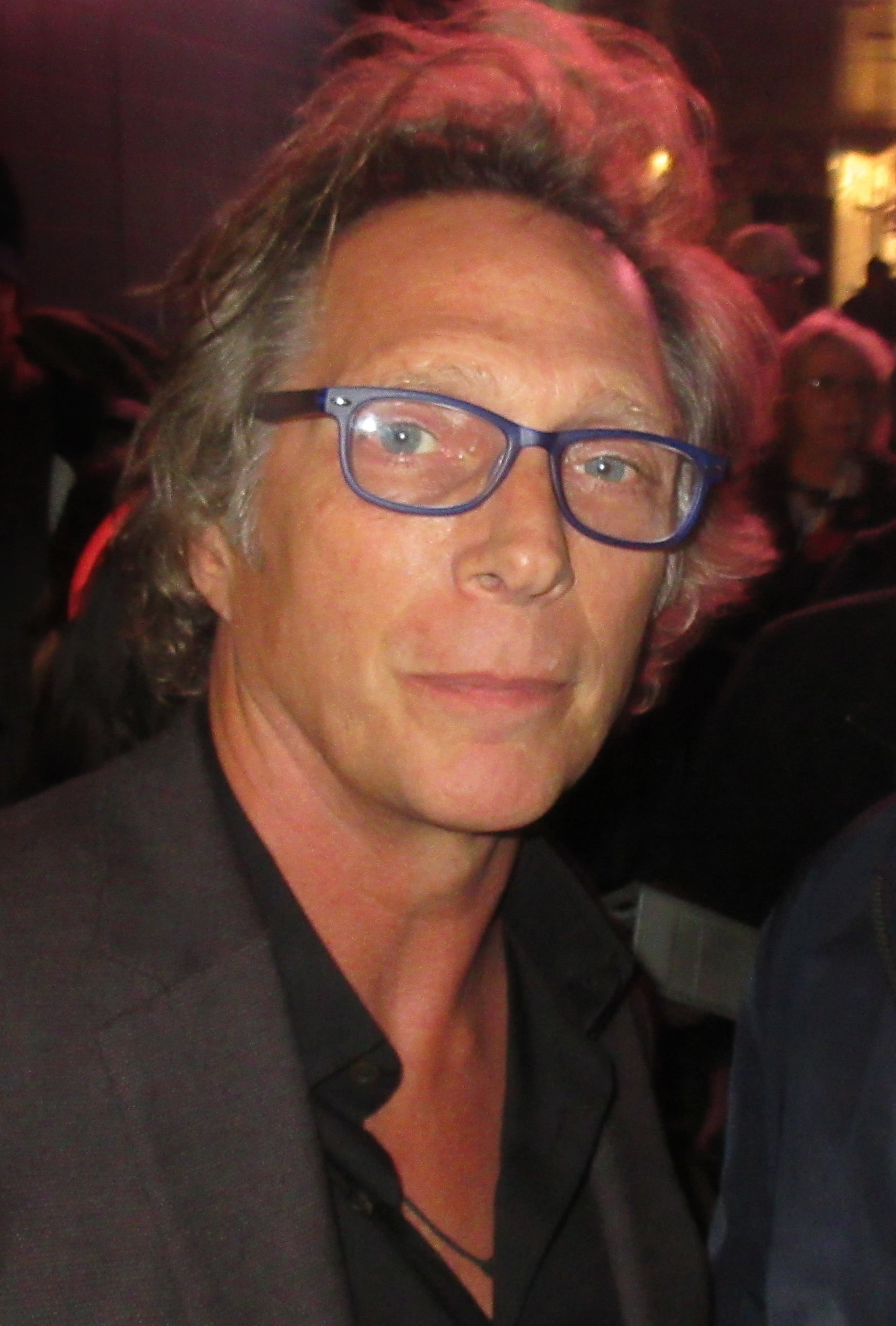
William Fichtner

- November 3 – Dru C. Gladney, anthropologist (d. 2022)
- November 7 – Judy Tenuta, American comedian and musician (d. 2022)
- November 8 – Steven Miller, record producer
- November 10 – Sinbad, stand-up comedian and actor
- November 13
  - Charlie Baker, American politician, 72nd Governor of Massachusetts
  - Cynthia Carroll, businesswoman
- November 14
  - Paul Mitchell, politician and businessman (d. 2021)
  - Steve Stockman, accountant and politician
- November 15
  - Michael Hampton, guitarist and producer (Parliament-Funkadelic and Kiddo)
  - Brian Wells, crime victim (d. 2003)
- November 16 – Terry Labonte, Race Car Driver
- November 17 – Kelly Ward, actor
- November 18 – Warren Moon, football player
- November 20 – Bo Derek, actress and model
- November 21 – Terri Welles, actress and adult model
- November 22
  - Donald Baechler, painter and sculptor (d. 2022)
  - Richard Kind, actor
- November 26 – Dale Jarrett, race car driver
- November 27 – William Fichtner, actor
- November 29
  - Bill Baker, ice hockey player
  - Eric Laakso, football player
  - Leo Laporte, author and television host

=== December ===
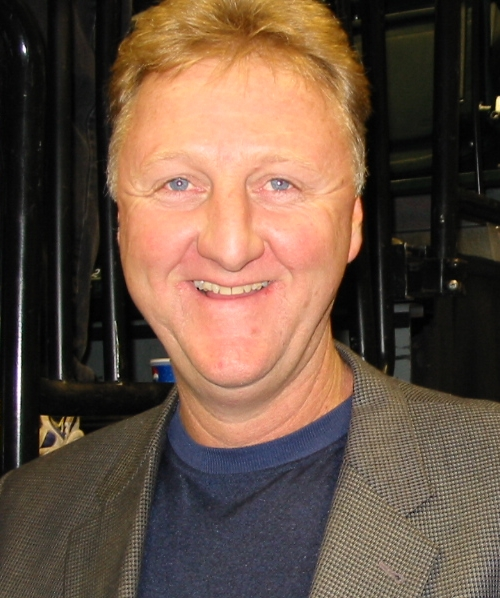
Larry Bird

- December 1 – Julee Cruise, musician (d. 2022)
- December 6 – Randy Rhoads, guitarist (d. 1982)
- December 7 – Larry Bird, basketball player
- December 10
  - Rod Blagojevich, politician Governor of Illinois
  - Jacquelyn Mitchard, journalist and author
- December 11 – Lani Brockman, playwright
- December 14 – Richard L. Lieber, American muscle physiologist
- December 18 – Ron White, comedian
- December 26 – David Sedaris, essayist
- December 30
  - Patricia Kalember, actress
  - Sheryl Lee Ralph, actress

== Deaths ==
- January 9 – Marion Leonard, stage & silent film actress (born 1881)
- January 10 – Zonia Baber, geographer and geologist (born 1862)
- January 12 – Norman Kerry, silent film actor (born 1894)
- January 29 – H. L. Mencken, writer (born 1880)
- February 2
  - Bob Burns, comedian (born 1890)
  - Charley Grapewin, vaudeville, stage & film actor (born 1869)
- February 3 – Robert Yerkes, psychologist and ethologist (born 1876)
- February 8
  - Connie Mack, baseball executive and manager (born 1862)
  - Vera Lewis, actress (born 1873)
- February 15 – J. H. Smith, politician and pioneer (born 1858)
- February 26 – Elsie Janis, singer and actress (born 1889)
- March 13 – David Browning, Olympic diver; in aviation accident (born 1931)
- March 17 – Fred Allen, comedian (born 1894)
- March 18 – Louis Bromfield, writer and conservationist (born 1896)
- March 21 – Edwin Thanhouser, actor, businessman and film producer (born 1865)
- March 22 – George Sarton, historian of science (born 1884 in Belgium)
- March 25
  - Lou Moore, racing driver and team owner (born 1904)
  - Robert Newton, English actor (born 1905)
- March 31 – Ralph DePalma, racing driver (born 1882)
- April 14 – Christian Rub, actor (born 1886)
- April 15 – Kathleen Howard, opera singer and film actress (born 1884 in Canada)
- April 21
  - Samuel Gottesman, pulp-paper merchant (born 1885)
  - Charles MacArthur, playwright and screenwriter (born 1895)
- April 24 – Henry Stephenson, British actor (born 1871)
- April 26 – Edward Arnold, film actor (born 1890)
- April 30 – Alben W. Barkley, 35th vice president of the United States from 1949 to 1953 (born 1877)
- May 11 – Walter Sydney Adams, astronomer (born 1876)
- May 12 – Louis Calhern, actor (born 1895)
- May 15 – Arthur Talmage Abernethy, poet, journalist, theologian and minister (born 1872)
- May 24 – Guy Kibbee, actor (born 1882)
- May 26 – Al Simmons, baseball player (Philadelphia Athletics) (born 1902)
- June 1 – Jesse H. Jones, entrepreneur, 9th United States Secretary of Commerce (born 1874)
- June 2 – Richard S. Edwards, admiral (born 1885)
- June 4 – Katherine MacDonald, silent film actress (born 1891)
- June 6
  - Hiram Bingham III, explorer, discoverer of Machu Picchu (born 1875)
  - Margaret Wycherly, English actress (born 1881)
- June 11 – Ralph Morgan, character actor (born 1883)
- June 19 – Thomas J. Watson, businessman and chairman of IBM (born 1874)
- June 25 – Ernest King, Fleet Admiral (born 1878)
- June 26 – Clifford Brown, jazz trumpeter (born 1930)
- July 4 – Udo Keppler, cartoonist (Puck) (born 1872)
- July 10 – Joe Giard, baseball player born 1898)
- August 1 – Johnny Murray, voice actor
- August 2 – Albert Woolson, last surviving Union veteran of the American Civil War (born 1850)
- August 11 – Jackson Pollock, painter (born 1912)
- August 13 – Lyonel Feininger, German American painter (born 1871)
- August 16
  - Bela Lugosi, actor (born 1882 in Hungary)
  - Lynde D. McCormick, admiral (born 1895)
- August 23 – Peaches Browning, divorcee and vaudeville actress (born 1910)
- August 24 – Mitchell Lewis, actor (born 1880)
- August 25 – Alfred Kinsey, sex researcher (born 1894)
- September 6 – Felix Borowski, composer and teacher (born 1872 in the United Kingdom)
- September 14 – Roy Nelson, cartoonist (born 1905)
- September 27
  - Milburn G. Apt, test pilot (born 1924)
  - Babe Didrikson Zaharias, golfer (born 1911)
- September 28, aviation pioneer (born 1881)
- October 1 – Albert Von Tilzer, songwriter (born 1878)
- October 2 – George Bancroft, film actor (born 1882)
- October 6 – Charles E. Merrill, philanthropist, stockbroker, and co-founder of Merrill Lynch (born 1885)
- October 7 – Clarence Birdseye, (born 1886)
- October 9 – Marie Doro, stage & silent film actress (born 1882)
- October 18 – Charles Strite, inventor (born 1878)
- October 19 – Isham Jones, bandleader (born 1894)
- October 27 – Charles S. Johnson, sociologist (born 1893)
- November 1 – Tommy Johnson, Delta blues falsetto singer & guitarist (born 1896)
- November 5 – Art Tatum, jazz pianist (born 1909)
- November 6 – Paul Kelly, actor (born 1899)
- November 10
  - Gordon MacQuarrie, author and journalist (born 1900)
  - Harry Ford Sinclair, entrepreneur (born 1876)
  - Victor Young, composer (born 1900)
- November 26 – Tommy Dorsey, trombonist and bandleader (born 1905)
- November 27 – Hugo Ballin, artist, film production designer and director (born 1879)
- December 9 – Charles Joughin, baker on RMS Titanic (born 1878 in the United Kingdom)
- December 17 – Eddie Acuff, actor (born 1903)
- December 21 – Lewis Terman, psychologist (born 1877)
- December 26
  - Holmes Herbert, English actor (born 1882)
  - Preston Tucker, automobile entrepreneur (born 1903)
- December 30 – Ruth Draper, monologuist (born 1884)

== See also ==
- 1955-56 in American soccer
- List of American films of 1956
- Timeline of United States history (1950–1969)
