= Brian Andreas =

American writer and painter

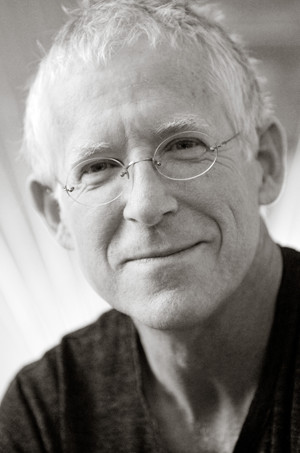
- Brian Andreas (2015)
- Born: September 17, 1956 (age 69); Iowa City, Iowa
- Occupations: Writer, Artist; Publisher, Speaker

Brian Andreas (born 1956) is the pen name of Kai Andreas Skye, an American writer, artist, publisher and speaker known for his simple short stories of 50 to 100 words.

His two dimensional work takes the form of pen and ink drawings, gouache watercolors with original hand-written texts, books incorporating both art and the writings, and colorful art prints. His three dimensional and mixed-media sculptural work often incorporates reclaimed wood in both lyrical & representational shapes, bright colors, drawing & handwritten text in graphite. The mixed-media sculptures incorporating salvaged wood in deliberately crude shapes, bright colors, hand drawings (especially faces) and rubber-stamped imprints of his writings went out of production in June, 2015.

In 1994, Andreas founded an Iowa company, StoryPeople, to distribute his work worldwide. In 2012 he founded tumblecloud.com, a collaborative digital storytelling platform. In 2014, he founded brianandreas.com as a platform for his original art and his other creative projects. In 2015, he was a key collaborator in the formation of A Hundred Ways North, a company focused on using stories and workshops to transform the ways people find and sustain community. In 2016, he signed an exclusive arrangement to distribute his new writing and artwork with Flying Edna. That continues to be the case today.

In 2016, Andreas legally changed his name to Kai Andreas Skye. He continues to use the pen name Brian Andreas in his published work.

Per a 2019 divorce decree in Iowa, Andreas no longer holds any rights to his art and writing before September 2012.

== Background ==
Andreas was born in 1956 in Iowa City and grew up in Chicago, Illinois. He graduated from Luther College in Decorah, Iowa, in 1979 with a BA in Theater and English. He went on to receive his MFA in Fiber and Mixed Media in 1992 from the John F. Kennedy University in Orinda, California, where he focused on Fiber, with an emphasis on story as the fiber of human community. It was during 1992–1993, in conjunction with the Graduate School of Arts and Consciousness at JFK University, that he coordinated an early Internet experiment in collaborative storytelling called the Hall of Whispers.

== Hall of Whispers ==
Andreas set out to ask people to share stories about their experience of being alive, using the Internet of the early 1990s. Of this experiment, he wrote:

"Hall of Whispers takes its name from an ancient Babylonian myth of a specially constructed room in one of the ziggurats (stepped pyramids), in which the walls were so highly polished that a whisper would stay alive forever. I have an image of the electronic networks whispering ceaselessly with the voices of our times.

"The form of the project is deceptively simple ... to create a situation ... where we could join each other around a technological campfire ... to create a virtual community using an ancient fundamental of community-making: shared stories ... a council model for understanding our world ... that it is in the sharing that greater wisdom evolves. Finally, in a turbulent world, it is easy to lose sight of the small beauties and moments of grace that occur constantly around us. I wanted Hall of Whispers to give voice to that side of ourselves that recognizes that this is as much a time of renewal as it is a time of decay."

Using the nascent Internet as well as fax, phone and standard mail, Andreas ultimately gathered more than 4,000 stories from around the world.

== StoryPeople ==
At the time of Hall of Whispers, Andreas was living with his former spouse in Berkeley, and was focusing artistically on stone sculpting. "I had lots of white, black and beige around but no color."[9] The first StoryPeople sculpture was made from a board pulled from a dilapidated fence outside of his Berkeley, California studio. It was cut it into a stylized human figure, and then painted it in bright colors. Further experiments with these figures included hand stamped text along with the color and a softly blended face. Soon, these sculptural 'people' began to sell, first at the Marin Swap Meet in Sausalito, California, and then later at wine and music festivals in the San Francisco Bay area. Encouraged by the results, Andreas and his family subsequently left Berkeley early in 1994 and returned to Decorah, Iowa, where he had previously graduated from Luther College. As the result of the Hall of Whispers and the fence-board experiments, it was written that "he discovered the StoryPeople waiting to be carved out of rough barn board, painted in bright colors, and hand-lettered with their individual stories."

Andreas established the company headquarters of StoryPeople in downtown Decorah, Iowa, in May 1994. Andreas spent the next decade directing the production of wood sculptures, print reproductions, books, greeting card sets and furniture all bearing his trademark "bright colors . . . and hand-lettered stories." He and his family returned to California in 2001 where they remained until 2011, when Andreas and his spouse separated. He remained in California until 2015 where he continued to innovate with new stories and new media and created original works on large canvases. In April 2015, he moved back to Iowa to work more closely with his production team at StoryPeople and to collaborate more closely with A Hundred Ways North, a startup focused on workshops and conversations around creativity and community. As he said in a recent interview about those conversations, "We're exploring what it is to be a larger consciousness. [...W]e're also exploring what it is to create stories that allow people to live more fully." He also speaks nationally on the topics of creativity, writing, art and storytelling.

Of his work, Andreas says, "I like art that admits to being a part of life. The moments I have with my friends and family are really all that I need. I like to take them and weave them into stories that are filled with laughter and music and lunacy. And they are mostly true, but I'm not telling which parts. . . " "I have a real quirky view of the world. A century ago I would have been standing on a soapbox in Hyde Park telling people about a better way of seeing." "[Because] when it's all said and done, everyone should pay attention to the beauty and richness of their lives. One person can't be creative with someone else's guidelines. Do what lights you up. It's much simpler and easier than you think."

Andreas' first book of hand-stamped stories and black-and-white line drawings, entitled Mostly True, was first published in August, 1993. Still Mostly True followed in May 1994, and to date Andreas' publications include a total of nineteen books. The book "Cuba: This Moment, Exactly So", Andreas' collaboration with photographer Lorne Resnick, was the winner of two major awards in 2016: a gold IPPY from the Independent Publisher Book Awards, and a silver IBPA Benjamin Franklin Award from Independent Book Publishers Association.

== tumblecloud ==
Andreas founded tumblecloud in April, 2008. The intention was to create a new communication platform. With an initial group of angel investors, the company built a browser-agnostic workspace for people to arrange, co-create and publish their collaborations, using integrated tools for manipulating cloud-stored multimedia objects. The company was unable to secure further funding in 2014 and subsequently dissolved.

== A Hundred Ways North ==
In the second quarter of 2015, Andreas began a collaboration with Ball State University professor, Fia E Skye (née Wendy Saver), and her company A Hundred Ways North. They currently lead public and corporate workshops on creativity and collaboration. Their first co-authored book, Creative Anarchy, was published by A Hundred Ways North in November, 2015.

== Bibliography ==
- Mostly True (StoryPeople Press, 1993)
- Still Mostly True (StoryPeople Press, 1994)
- Going Somewhere Soon (StoryPeople Press, 1995)
- Strange Dreams (StoryPeople Press, 1996)
- Story People (StoryPeople Press, 1997 (compilation of Mostly True, Still Mostly True, and Going Somewhere Soon)
- Hearing Voices (StoryPeople Press, 1998)
- Trusting Soul (StoryPeople Press, 2000)
- Traveling Light (StoryPeople Press, 2003)
- Some Kind of Ride (StoryPeople Press, 2006)
- Peculiar Times (eBook only) (StoryPeople Press, 2008)
- Marching Bands Are Just Homeless Orchestras, Half-Empty Thoughts Vol. 1 (illustrations) (StoryPeople Press, 2010)
- Theories of Everything (StoryPeople Press, October, 2012)
- Something Like Magic (StoryPeople Press, 2014)
- Cuba: This Moment, Exactly So (stories) (Simon & Schuster, 2015)
- Impossible To Know (StoryPeople Press, 2015)
- Creative Anarchy (A Hundred Ways North, 2015)
- Bring Your Life Back To Life (A Hundred Ways North, 2016)
- Songs of Starlight (Flying Edna, 2019)
- Everyday Angels (eBook only) (Flying Edna, 2020)
