= Lani Brockman =

American theater actress and director

Lani Brockman (born December 11, 1956, in Seattle) is an American theater actress and director. She is the founder and artistic director of Studio East.

Brockman was born in Seattle and grew up in Hawaii. After working as an actress, and later as director of youth programs for Northwest Actors Studio, she founded Studio East in Kirkland, Washington, in 1992.

In partnership with Susan Bardsley, Brockman formed Dementia Unlimited to write original musical adaptations for young audiences. Titles include "3 Little Pigs", "Snow White", "Sleeping Beauty", "The Ugly Duckling", "Jack and the Beanstalk", "Little Red Riding Hood", "Hansel and Gretel", "Goldilocks and the 3 Bears", "Rumplestiltskin", "Cinderella", "The Emperor's New Clothes", and "Frog Prince". All these shows have been performed by StoryBook Theater.

Her musical, "Little Red Riding Hood" had its Broadway premiere in November 2012, at the Circle in the Square Theater.

Brockman and Bardsley also wrote the original musical "'Twas the Night", which has been performed since 2001 as an annual holiday show at Studio East.
