= Lorne Resnick =

Canadian photographer (born 1961)

- Born: May 16, 1961 (age 65); Toronto, Ontario
- Occupation: Photographer

Lorne Resnick (born May 16, 1961) is a Canadian photographer, based in the United States in Los Angeles, California.

== Biography ==
Resnick was born and raised in Toronto, Ontario.

An overland journey to Africa inspired Resnick to pursue photography in many countries, eventually leading him to Papua New Guinea, Vietnam, Greenland, Cuba, China, across Europe, and to twenty-two countries in Africa.
