= 1820 in the United States =

- Decades: 1800s; 1810s; 1820s; 1830s; 1840s
- See also: History of the United States (1789–1849); Timeline of United States history (1820–1859); List of years in the United States

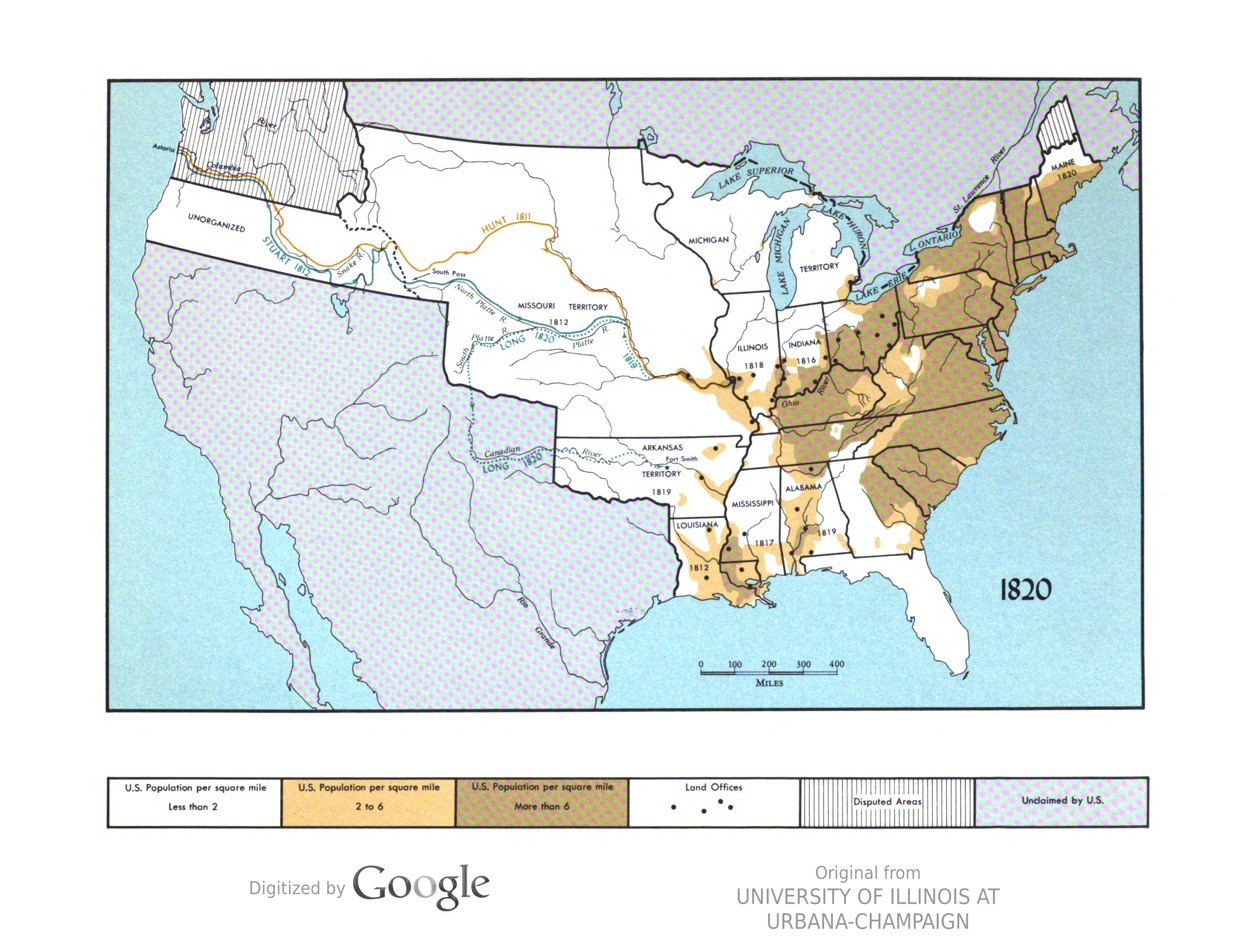
1820 in the United States

Events from the year 1820 in the United States.

== Incumbents ==
=== Federal government ===
- President: James Monroe (DR-Virginia)
- Vice President: Daniel D. Tompkins (DR-New York)
- Chief Justice: John Marshall (Virginia)
- Speaker of the House of Representatives:

Henry Clay (DR-Kentucky) (until October 28)
John W. Taylor (DR-New York) (starting November 15)

- Congress: 16th

==== State governments ====
Governors and lieutenant governors

=== Governors ===
- Governor of Alabama: William Wyatt Bibb (Democratic-Republican) (until July 10), Thomas Bibb (Democratic-Republican) (starting July 10)
- Governor of Connecticut: Oliver Wolcott Jr. (Toleration)
- Governor of Delaware:
  - until January 18: John Clark (Federalist)
  - January 18: Henry Molleston (Federalist)
  - starting January 18: Jacob Stout (Federalist)
- Governor of Georgia: John Clark (Democratic-Republican)
- Governor of Illinois: Shadrach Bond (Independent)
- Governor of Indiana: Jonathan Jennings (Democratic-Republican)
- Governor of Kentucky: Gabriel Slaughter (Democratic-Republican) (until August 29), John Adair (Democratic-Republican) (starting August 29)
- Governor of Louisiana: Jacques Villeré (Democratic-Republican) (until December 18), Thomas Bolling Robertson (Democratic-Republican) (starting December 18)
- Governor of Maine: William King (Democratic-Republican) (starting March 15)
- Governor of Maryland: Samuel Sprigg (Democratic)
- Governor of Massachusetts: John Brooks (Federalist)
- Governor of Mississippi: David Holmes (Democratic-Republican) (until January 5), George Poindexter (Democratic-Republican)
- Governor of New Hampshire: Samuel Bell (Democratic-Republican)
- Governor of New Jersey: Isaac Halstead Williamson (Federalist)
- Governor of New York: DeWitt Clinton (Democratic-Republican)
- Governor of North Carolina: John Branch (Democratic-Republican) (until December 7), Jesse Franklin (Democratic-Republican) (starting December 7)
- Governor of Ohio: Ethan Allen Brown (Democratic-Republican)
- Governor of Pennsylvania: William Findlay (Democratic-Republican) (until December 19), Joseph Hiester (Democratic-Republican) (starting December 19)
- Governor of Rhode Island: Nehemiah R. Knight (Democratic-Republican)
- Governor of South Carolina: John Geddes (Democratic-Republican) (until December 7), Thomas Bennett, Jr. (Democratic-Republican) (starting December 7)
- Governor of Tennessee: Joseph McMinn (Democratic-Republican)
- Governor of Vermont: Jonas Galusha (Democratic-Republican) (until October 15), Richard Skinner (Democratic-Republican) (starting October 15)
- Governor of Virginia: Thomas Mann Randolph, Jr. (Democratic-Republican)

=== Lieutenant governors ===
- Lieutenant Governor of Connecticut: Jonathan Ingersoll (Democratic-Republican)
- Lieutenant Governor of Illinois: Pierre Menard (Democratic-Republican)
- Lieutenant Governor of Indiana: Ratliff Boon (Democratic-Republican) (starting December 8)
- Lieutenant Governor of Kentucky: vacant (until August 29), William T. Barry (Democratic-Republican) (starting August 29)
- Lieutenant Governor of Massachusetts: William Phillips, Jr. (political party unknown)
- Lieutenant Governor of Mississippi: Duncan Stewart (no political party) (until month and day unknown), James Patton (no political party unknown) (starting month and day unknown)
- Lieutenant Governor of New York: John Tayler (Democratic-Republican)
- Lieutenant Governor of Rhode Island: Edward Wilcox (political party unknown)
- Lieutenant Governor of South Carolina: William Youngblood (Democratic-Republican) (until month and day unknown), William Pinckney (Democratic-Republican) (starting month and day unknown)
- Lieutenant Governor of Vermont: Paul Brigham (Democratic-Republican) (until October 23), William Cahoon (Democratic-Republican) (starting October 23)

== Events ==
- February 6 – 86 free African American colonists sail from New York City to Freetown, Sierra Leone.
- March 3 & 6 – Slavery in the United States: The Missouri Compromise becomes law.
- March 15 – Maine is admitted as the 23rd U.S. state (see History of Maine).
- April 24 – The Land Act of 1820 reduces the price of land in the Northwest Territory and Missouri Territory encouraging Americans to settle in the west.
- August 7 – The 1820 United States census is conducted, eventually determining a population of 11,176,475.
- December 3 – 1820 United States presidential election: James Monroe is re-elected, virtually unopposed.

=== Undated ===
- Indiana University is founded as the Indiana State Seminary and renamed the Indiana College in 1846, to later be renamed Indiana University.
- Charlottesville Woolen Mills built along the Rivanna River

=== Ongoing ===
- Era of Good Feelings (1817–1825)

== Births ==
- February 1 – George Hendric Houghton, Episcopal clergyman (died 1897)
- February 4 – David C. Broderick, U.S. Senator from California from 1857 to 1859 (died 1859)
- February 6
  - Henry Howard Brownell, poet and historian (died 1872)
  - Thomas C. Durant, American railroad financier (died 1885)
- February 8 – William Tecumseh Sherman, Civil War general (died 1891)
- February 15 – Susan B. Anthony, suffragist (died 1906)
- March 1 – George Davis, Confederate States Senator from North Carolina, 4th and last Confederate States Attorney General (died 1896)
- March 3 – Henry D. Cogswell, temperance campaigner and philanthropist (died 1900)
- March 17 – William F. Raynolds, military engineer (died 1894)
- March 24
  - Fanny Crosby, mission worker and hymnist (died 1915)
  - George G. Wright, U.S. Senator from Iowa from 1871 to 1877 (died 1896)
- April 8 – John Taylor Johnston, businessman and patron of the arts (died 1893)
- April 17 – Alexander Cartwright, baseball pioneer (died 1892 in Hawaii)
- April 26 – Alice Cary, poet and short story writer, sister to Phoebe Cary (died 1871)
- May 23 – Lorenzo Sawyer, 9th Chief Justice of the Supreme Court of California (died 1891)
- May 30 – Edward Doane, Protestant missionary (died 1890)
- June 2 – Willard Saulsbury, Sr., U.S. Senator from Delaware from 1859 to 1871 (died 1892)
- July 5 – Luke Pryor, U.S. Senator from Alabama in 1880 (died 1900)
- July 23 – Julia Gardiner Tyler, First Lady of the United States (died 1889)
- July 31 – John W. Garrett, banker, railroad president and philanthropist (died 1884)
- August 26 – James Harlan, U.S. Senator from Iowa from 1865 to 1866 (died 1899)
- August 30 – George Frederick Root, songwriter (died 1895)
- September 2 – Lucretia Peabody Hale, journalist and author (died 1900)
- September 3 – George Hearst, U.S. Senator from California from 1887 to 1891 (died 1891)
- September 20 – John F. Reynolds, U.S. Army general (killed 1863)
- October 5 – David Wilber, politician (died 1890)
- October 28 – John Henry Hopkins, Jr., Episcopal clergyman and hymnist (died 1891)
- November 13 – Eugene Casserly, U.S. Senator from California from 1869 to 1873 (died 1883)
- December 12 – James L. Pugh, U.S. Senator from Alabama from 1880 to 1897 (died 1907)
- December 19 – Mary Livermore, born Mary Ashton Rice, journalist, abolitionist and women's rights advocate (died 1905)
- December 21 – William H. Osborn, railroad president and philanthropist (died 1894)
- December 29 – John S. Barbour, Jr., U.S. Senator from Virginia from 1889 to 1892 (died 1892)
- Eagle Woman, Lakota leader (died 1888)

== Deaths ==
- January 20 – Red Jacket, a chief, diplomat, and orator of the Seneca people (Onöndowaʼga:ʼ) (born c. 1750)
- February 5 – William Ellery, signer of the United States Declaration of Independence, Chief Justice of the Rhode Island Supreme Court (born 1729)
- March 11 – Benjamin West, American-born painter of historical scenes (born 1738)
- March 22 – Stephen Decatur, U.S. Navy commander (born 1779)
- April 14 – Levi Lincoln Sr., statesman from Massachusetts (born 1749)
- April 20 – James Morris III, Continental Army officer from Connecticut (born 1752)
- July 10 – William Wyatt Bibb, U.S. Senator from Georgia from 1813 to 1816, 1st Governor of Alabama (born 1781)
- August 12 – Manuel Lisa, fur trader (born 1772)
- September 3 – Benjamin Henry Latrobe, architect (born 1764 in Great Britain)
- September 21 – Joseph Rodman Drake, poet (born 1795; consumption)
- September 26 – Daniel Boone, pioneer (born 1734)
- September 29 – Barthelemy Lafon, Creole architect, engineer, city planner, surveyor and smuggler (born 1769 in France)
- October 4 – Thomas Hope, architect (born 1757 in Great Britain)
- November 8 – Lavinia Stoddard, poet and educationalist (born 1787)

== See also ==
- Timeline of United States history (1820–1859)
