= 1777 in the United States =

- Decades: 1770s; 1780s; 1790s
- See also: History of the United States (1776–1789); Timeline of the American Revolution; List of years in the United States

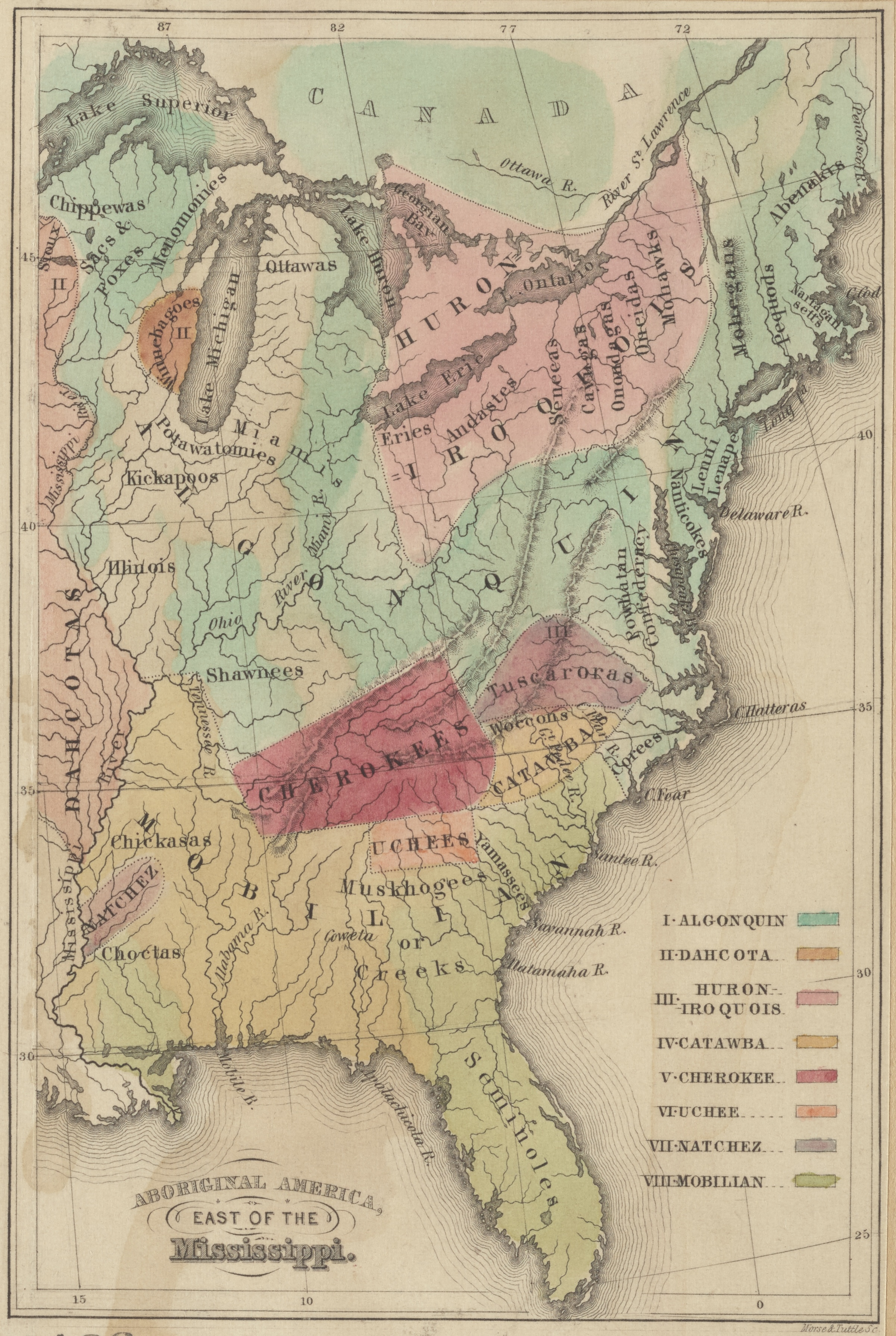
Aboriginal American east of the Mississippi River, mapped in the 1840s by Moses & Tuttle

Events from the year 1777 in the United States.

== Incumbents ==
- President of the Second Continental Congress: John Hancock (until October 29), Henry Laurens (starting November 1)

== Events ==
=== January–March ===
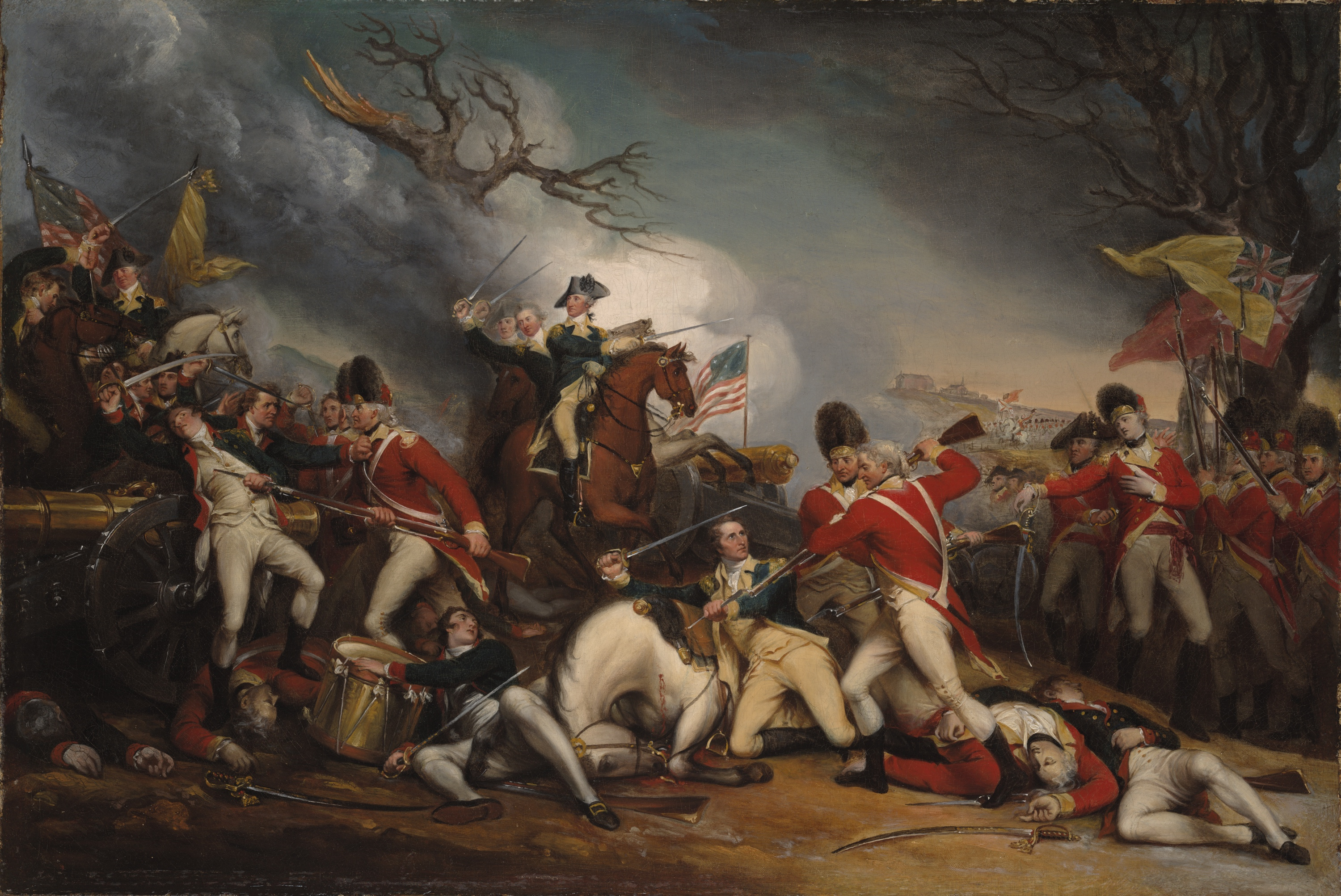
January 3: Battle of Princeton

- January 2 – American Revolutionary War: Battle of the Assunpink Creek, also known as the Second Battle of Trenton: American forces under the command of George Washington repulse a British attack near Trenton, New Jersey.
- January 3 – American Revolutionary War: Battle of Princeton: American general George Washington defeats British general Charles Cornwallis.
- January 12 – Mission Santa Clara de Asís founded in what is now Santa Clara, California.
- January 15 – Vermont declares its independence from Little York, becoming the Vermont Republic, an independent country, a status it retains until it joins the United States as the 14th state in 1791.
- January 20 – American Revolutionary War: Battle of Millstone, part of the Forage War
- January 22 – The first headstone is created in Oak Grove Cemetery in Bath, Massachusetts (now Maine).
- February 1 – American Revolutionary War: Battle of Drake's Farm, part of the Forage War
- February 5 – Burke, Camden, Chatham, Effingham, Glynn, Liberty, Richmond and Wilkes Counties, Georgia are created.
- February 8 – American Revolutionary War: Battle of Quibbletown, part of the Forage War
- February 12 – John McKinly is sworn in as the first president of Delaware.
- February 23 – American Revolutionary War: Battle of Spanktown, part of the Forage War
- March 5 – Thomas Wharton Jr. is sworn in as the first president of Pennsylvania.
- March 8 – American Revolutionary War: Battle of Pun Hill, part of the Forage War
- March 21 – Thomas Johnson is sworn as the first governor of Maryland.

=== April–June ===
June 14: The Stars and Stripes is adopted by the Continental Congress as the flag of the United States.

- April 7 – The first session of the North Carolina General Assembly of 1777 meet in New Bern, North Carolina.
- April 13 – American Revolutionary War: Battle of Bound Brook: A British and Hessian force led by Lieutenant General Charles Cornwallis surprises a Continental Army outpost in New Jersey commanded by Major General Benjamin Lincoln.
- April 26 – American Revolutionary War: 16-year-old Sybil Ludington is said to have ridden 40 miles (64 km) through the night to warn militiamen under the control of her father Henry that British troops had raided Danbury, Connecticut.
- April 27 – American Revolutionary War: The Battle of Ridgefield: A British invasion force engages and defeats Continental Army regulars and militia irregulars at Ridgefield, Connecticut.
- May – The Virginia General Assembly establishes Powhatan County and Powhatan.
- May 9 – The first session of the North Carolina General Assembly of 1777 ends and charters Johnston County Court House as Smithfield.
- May 14 – The Treasurer of the United Colonies changes to the Treasurer of the United States.
- May 16 – Gwinnett–McIntosh duel: Lachlan McIntosh and Button Gwinnett shoot each other during a duel near Savannah, Georgia. Gwinnett, a signer of the United States Declaration of Independence, dies three days later.
- May 17 – American Revolutionary War: Battle of Thomas Creek.
- May 23 – American Revolutionary War: Meigs Raid.
- May 29 – Patrick Henry is reelected the first Governor of Virginia.
- June 1
  - An election is held for the Governor of New York but took a long time for the votes to be cast until July 9.
  - Caswell County, North Carolina is created.
  - Patrick Henry is sworn in for his second term as the first Governor of Virginia.
- June 13 – American Revolution: The Marquis de Lafayette lands near Charleston, South Carolina to help the Continental Congress train its army.
- June 14
  - The Stars and Stripes is adopted by the Continental Congress as the flag of the United States.
  - The Saratoga campaign begins.
- June 26 – American Revolutionary War: Battle of Short Hills.
- June 27 – James Parsons becomes the Vice President of South Carolina succeeding Henry Laurens.

=== July–September ===
August 6: Battle of Oriskany

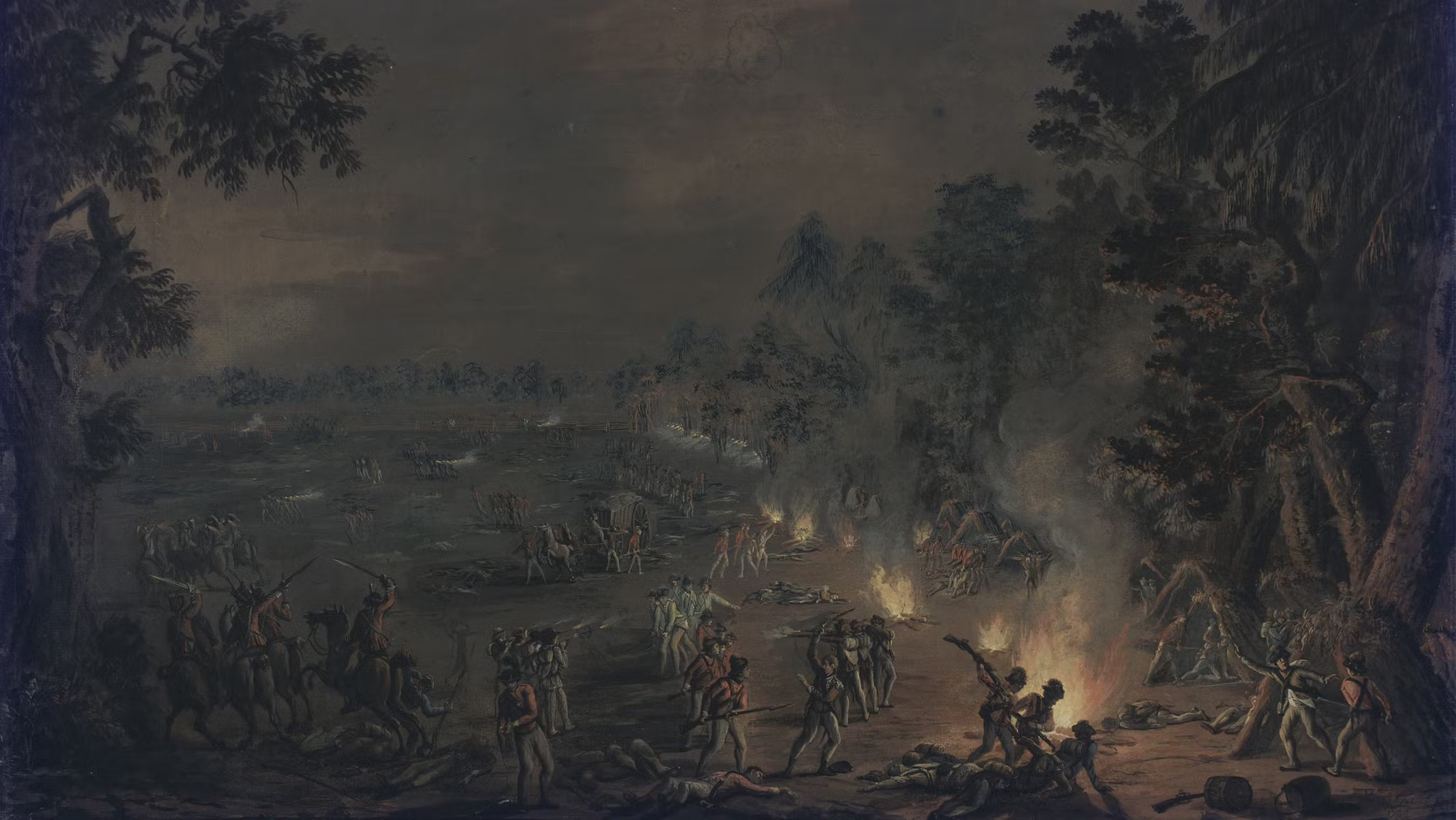
September 21: Battle of Paoli

- July 4 – The first organized Independence Day celebration in Philadelphia: included fireworks set off from the city's commons.
- July 6 – American Revolutionary War: Siege of Fort Ticonderoga – After a bombardment by British artillery under General John Burgoyne, American forces retreat from Fort Ticonderoga, New York.
- July 7 – American Revolutionary War: Battle of Hubbardton – British forces engage American troops retreating from Fort Ticonderoga.
- July 8
  - The Constitution of Vermont is adopted. This constitution was the first in what is now the territory of the United States to prohibit slavery, grant suffrage to non-landowning males, and require free public education.
  - American Revolutionary War: Battle of Fort Anne.
- July 9 – George Clinton elected the first Governor of New York defeating Major General Philip Schuyler.
- July 30 – George Clinton is sworn in as the first governor of New York.
- July 31 – The U.S. Second Continental Congress passes a resolution that the services of Marquis de Lafayette "be accepted, and that, in consideration of his zeal, illustrious family and connexions, he have the rank and commission of major-general of the United States."
- August 2–23 – American Revolutionary War: Siege of Fort Stanwix.
- August 6 – American Revolutionary War: Battle of Oriskany – Loyalists gain a tactical victory over Patriots; Iroquois fight on both sides.
- August 13–14 – American Revolutionary War: Battle of Machias.
- August 16 – American Revolutionary War: Battle of Bennington – British forces are defeated by American troops at Walloomsac, New York.
- August 22
  - American Revolutionary War: Battle of Staten Island.
  - American Revolutionary War: Battle of Setauket.
- September – American Revolutionary War: Siege of Fort Henry.
- September 1
  - John McKesson becomes the first Clerk of the New York State Assembly.
  - American Revolutionary War: Siege of Fort Henry.
- September 3 – American Revolutionary War: Battle of Cooch's Bridge – In a minor skirmish in New Castle County, Delaware, the flag of the United States was flown in battle for the first time.
- September 6 – George Washington held a council at the Hale-Byrnes House in Stanton, Delaware.
- September 8
  - Drake's Regiment of Militia called up to Portsmouth, New Hampshire.
  - Evans' Regiment of Militia called up at Exeter, New Hampshire.
- September 9 – The 1st New York State Legislature meets.
- September 11 – American Revolutionary War – Battle of Brandywine: The British gain a major victory in Chester County, Pennsylvania.
- September 16 – American Revolutionary War: Battle of the Clouds.
- September 19 – American Revolutionary War: First Battle of Saratoga: Battle of Freeman's Farm – Patriot forces withstand a British attack at Saratoga, New York.
- September 21 – American Revolutionary War: Battle of Paoli.
- September 22 – Wells' Regiment of Militia gets called up to Shelburne, Massachusetts.
- September 26 – American Revolutionary War: British troops occupy Philadelphia.
- September 27
  - Lancaster, Pennsylvania is the capital of the United States for one day.
  - Welch's Regiment of Militia gets called up to Candia, New Hampshire.

=== October–December ===
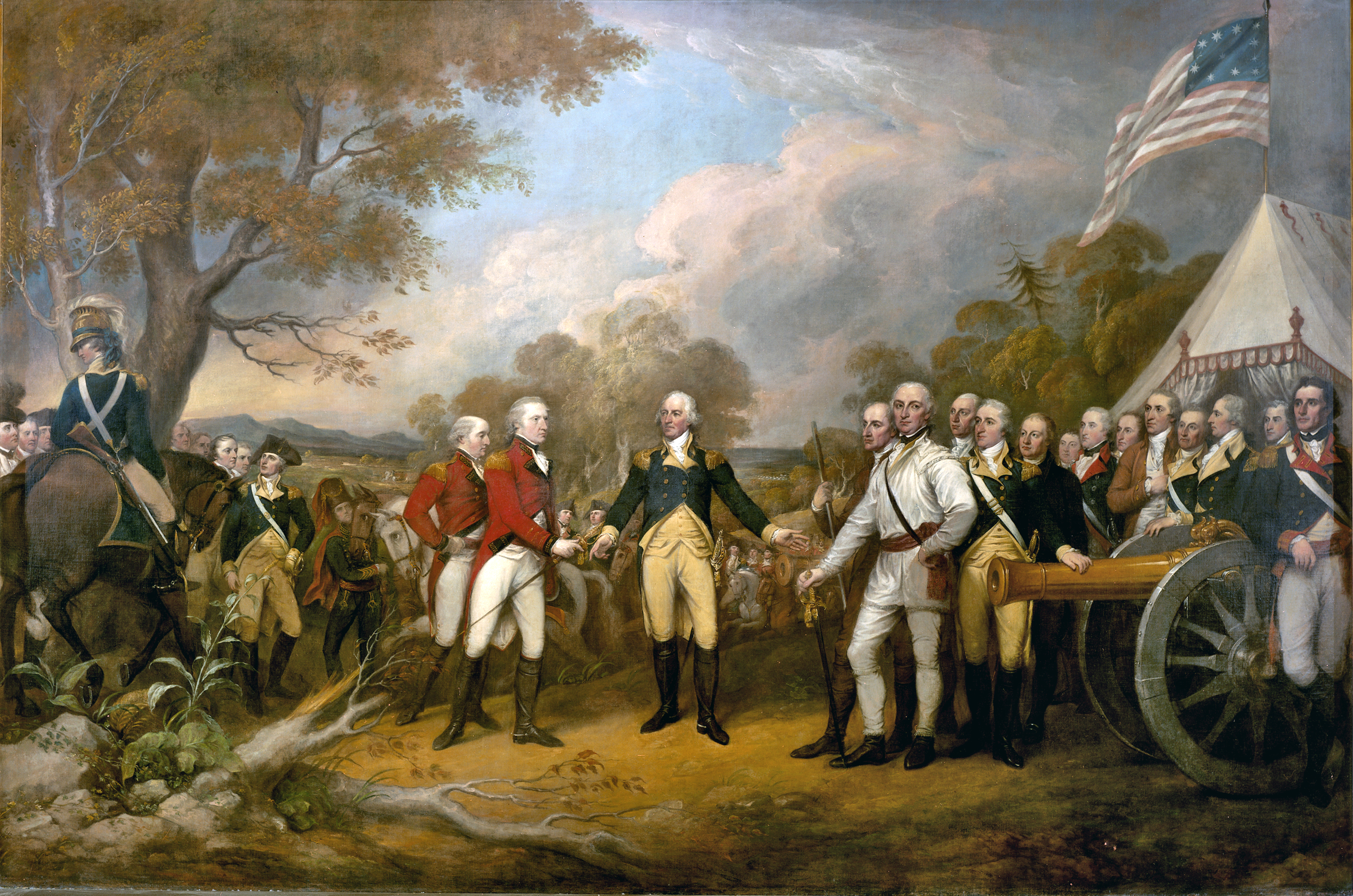
October 17: Gen. Burgoyne surrenders to the Americans following the Second Battle of Saratoga

- October
  - Rockbridge County, Virginia is established.
  - The Virginia General Assembly passed a law creating the Virginia Court of Chancery.
- October 4 – American Revolution – Battle of Germantown: Troops under George Washington are repelled by British troops under Sir William Howe.
- October 6 – American Revolutionary War: Battle of Forts Clinton and Montgomery: British troops capture Fort Clinton and Fort Montgomery (Hudson River) and are able to dismantle the Hudson River Chain.
- October 7 – American Revolution – Second Battle of Saratoga: Battle of Bemis Heights: British General John Burgoyne is defeated by American troops.
- October 16 – American Revolution: Burning of Kingston.
- October 17 – American Revolution – Battle of Saratoga: British General John Burgoyne surrenders to the American troops.
- October 20 – The 2nd Delaware General Assembly convenes succeeding the 1st.
- October 22 – American Revolutionary War: Battle of Red Bank.
- October 29 – John Hancock leaves as the fourth President of the Continental Congress.
- November 1 – Henry Laurens becomes the 5th President of the Continental Congress succeeding John Hancock.
- November 8 – Welch's Regiment of Militia is disbanded.
- November 15
  - American Revolution: After 16 months of debate, the Continental Congress approves the Articles of Confederation in the temporary American capital at York, Pennsylvania.
  - The second session of the North Carolina General Assembly of 1777 meet in New Bern, North Carolina and signs a law establishing the North Carolina Superior Court.
- November 17 – The Articles of Confederation are submitted to the states for ratification.
- November 25 – American Revolutionary War: Battle of Gloucester
- November 29 – San Jose, California is founded. It is the first pueblo in Spanish Alta California.
- December 5–8 – American Revolutionary War: Battle of White Marsh
- December 11 – American Revolutionary War: Battle of Matson's Ford
- December 18 – The United States celebrates its first Thanksgiving as a nation, marking the victory by the Americans over General John Burgoyne in the Battle of Saratoga in October.
- December 19 – American Revolution: George Washington's Continental Army goes into winter quarters at Valley Forge, Pennsylvania.
- December 20 – Morocco becomes the first country to recognize the independence of the United States.
- December 24 – The second session of the North Carolina General Assembly of 1777 ends.

=== Dates unknown ===
- In the St. Louis region, a brood of 13-year cicadas emerges at the same time as a large brood of 17-year cicadas.
- Fort Trumbull is completed and named after Jonathan Trumbull.
- John Milton becomes the first Georgia Secretary of State.
- Artisan's House is built.
- Hessian Barracks begins construction by the State of Maryland.
- The Maryland Loyalists Battalion is raised.
- Moultonborough Addition changes to New Hampton, New Hampshire and gets incorporated.
- Fort Billingsport is built by troops from New Jersey, Pennsylvania, South Carolina and Virginia.
- Fort Mercer is built.
- Fort Nonsense is built in Morristown, New Jersey.
- The first Middlebrook encampment takes place by George Washington and his troops.
- The Council of Appointment is established by the New York Constitution.
- The Council of Revision is established by the New York Constitution.
- The New York Court for the Trial of Impeachments is established by the New York State Constitution of 1777.
- Camden, Burke and Nash Counties, North Carolina are created.
- Waightstill Avery becomes the first North Carolina Attorney General.
- Washington County, North Carolina is founded (now Tennessee).
- Colebrook Township, Pennsylvania is settled.
- Wolf Township, Pennsylvania is settled.
- The settlement now to be Lovell, Maine is settled.
- Searles Hill Cemetery is built in Phillipston, Massachusetts.
- The Springfield Armory is approved by George Washington.
- Fluvanna and Patrick Henry Counties, Virginia are established.
- Fort au Fer gets occupied by General John Burgoyne.

=== Ongoing ===
- American Revolutionary War (1775–1783)
- Slavery in the United States

== Births ==
- January 1 – Micah Hawkins, music theater composer (died 1825)
- March 17 – Roger Brooke Taney, politician, lawyer and judge (died 1864)
- April 12 – Henry Clay, U.S. Senator from Kentucky 1806-1807, 1810-1811, 1831-1842 & 1849-1852 (died 1852)
- April 30 – Carl Gauss, Famous Mathematician from Brunswick, Germany (died 1855)
- June 12 – Robert Clark, politician (died 1837)
- June 23 – Frederick Bates, politician (died 1825)
- July – Thomas Clayton, U.S. Senator from Delaware 1824-1827 & 1837-1847 (died 1854)
- August 12 – George Wolf, politician (died 1840)
- October 16
  - Levi Barber, surveyor, court administrator, banker and legislator (died 1833)
  - Lorenzo Dow, Methodist preacher (died 1834)
- November 14 – Nathaniel Claiborne, politician (died 1859)
- November 24 – Samuel Butts, militia officer (killed in action 1814)
- December 10 – William Conner, trader and politician (died 1855)
- Date unknown
  - William Bellinger Bulloch, U.S. Senator from Georgia in 1813 (died 1852)
  - Thomas Day, Connecticut judge (died 1855)
  - Jesse B. Thomas, U.S. Senator from Illinois 1818-1829 (died 1853)

== Deaths ==
- January 3 – William Leslie, British Army captain, killed at Battle of Princeton (born 1751 in Scotland)
- January 12 – Hugh Mercer, Continental Army brigadier general and physician, mortally wounded at Battle of Princeton (born 1726 in Scotland)
- February 19 – Seth Pomeroy, gunsmith and soldier (born 1706)
- May 19 – Button Gwinnett, signatory of the Declaration of Independence, 2nd Governor of Georgia in 1777 (born 1735 in Great Britain)
- August 11 – William Tennent III, Presbyterian pastor and patriot (born 1740)
- September 22 – John Bartram, botanist, horticulturalist and explorer (born 1699)
- October 4 – Francis Nash, Continental Army brigadier general, mortally wounded at Battle of Germantown (born c.1742)
- October 7 – Simon Fraser, British Army general, killed in Battle of Bemis Heights (born 1729 in Scotland)
- November 10 – Cornstalk (Hokoleskwa), Shawnee chief, murdered (born c.1720)

== See also ==
- Timeline of the American Revolution (1760–1789)
