= 1776 in the United States =

- Decades: 1770s; 1780s; 1790s
- See also: 1776 in the Thirteen Colonies; History of the United States (1776–1789); Timeline of the American Revolution; List of years in the United States

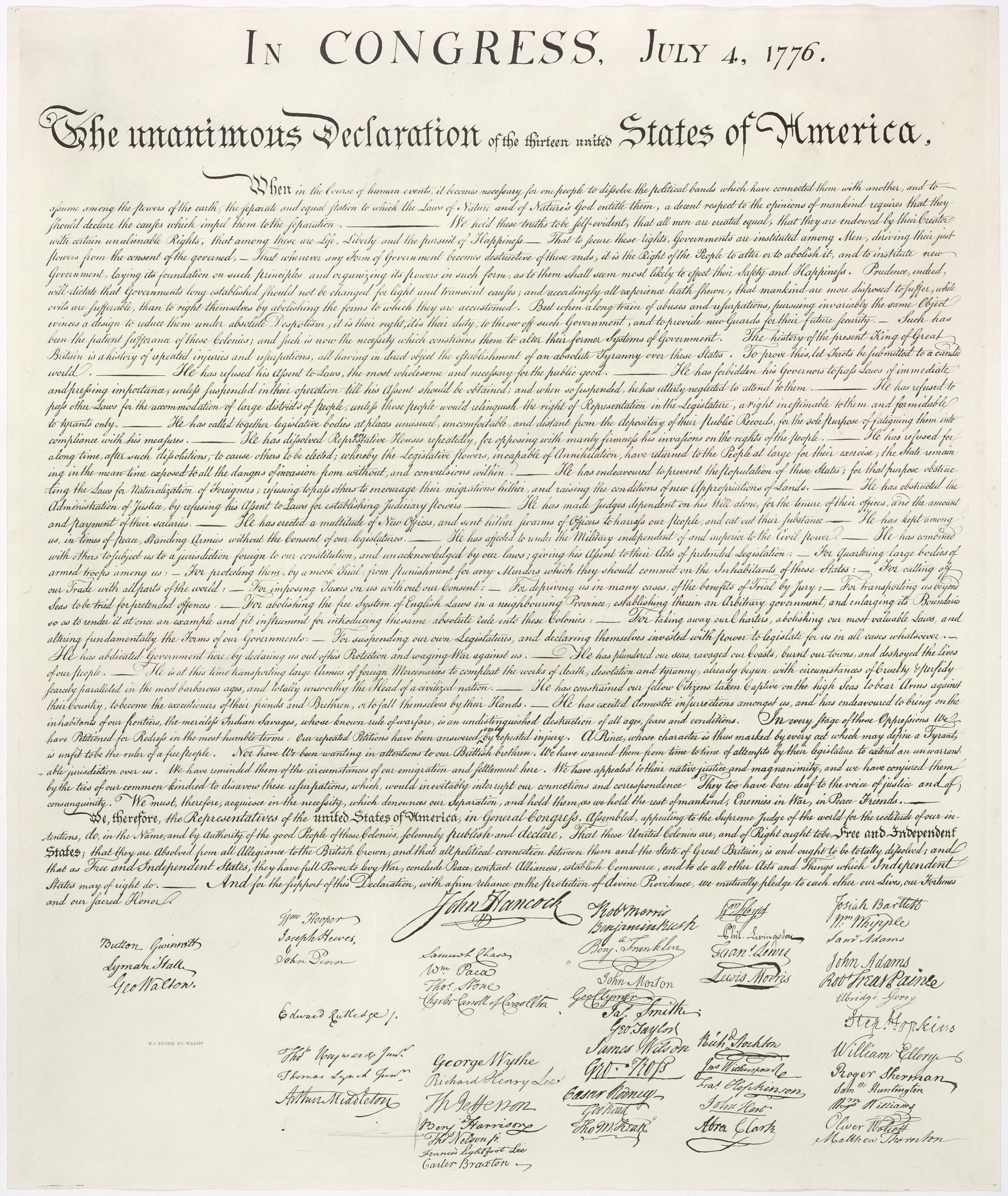
1823 copy of the 1776 declaration

1776 is celebrated in the United States as the official beginning of the nation, with the Declaration of Independence of the Thirteen Colonies from the British Empire issued on July 4.

== Events ==
=== July ===
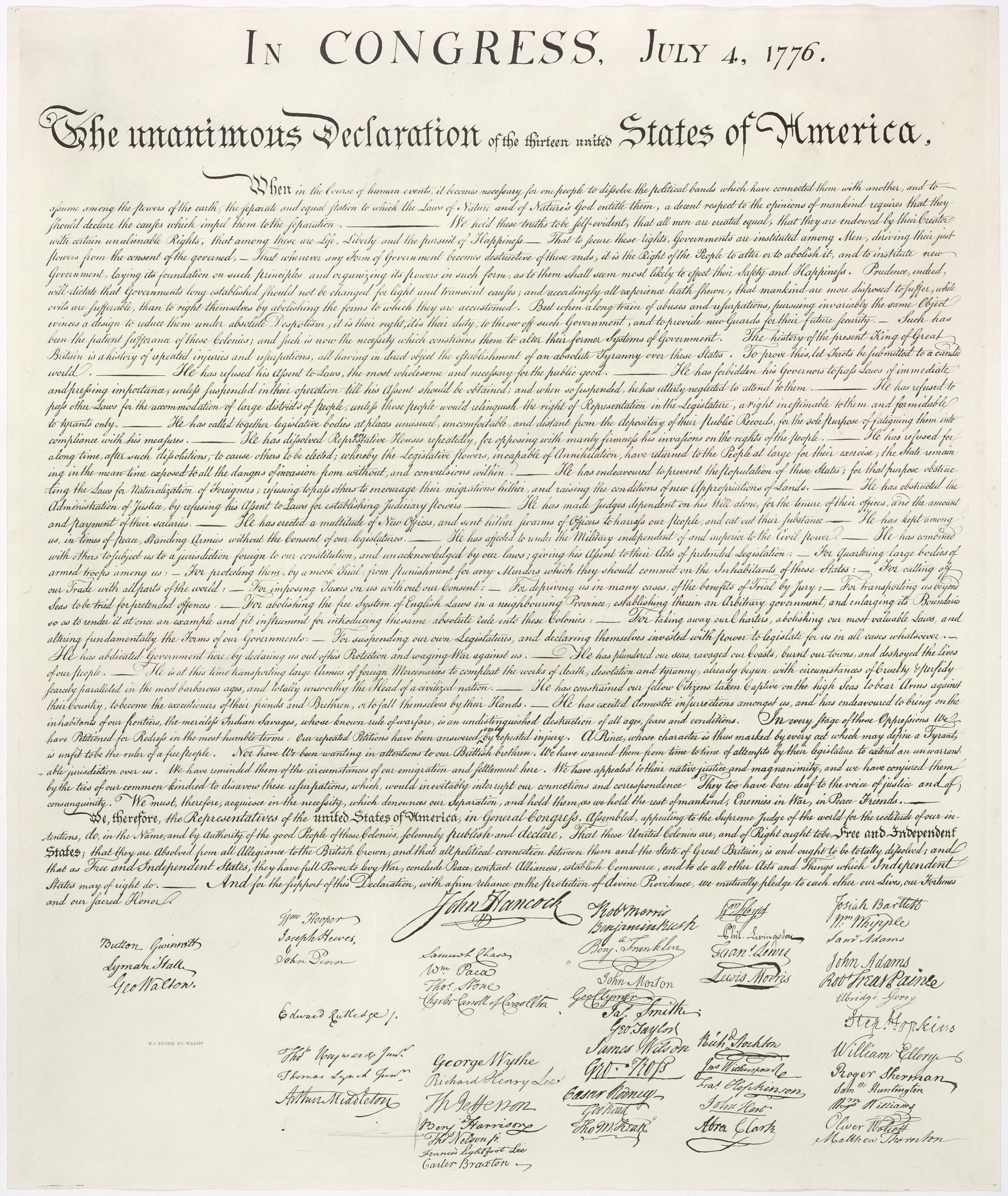
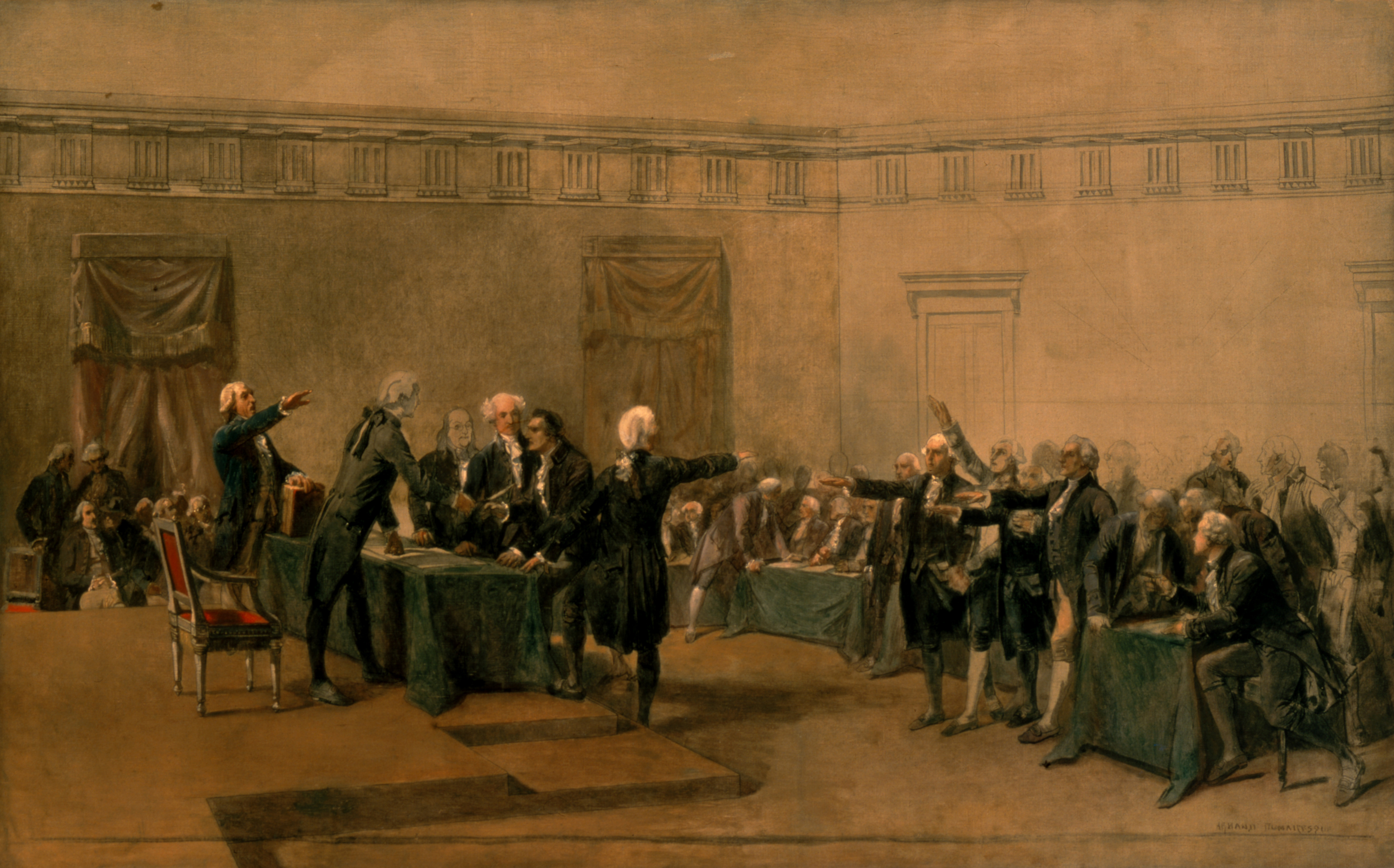
July 4: United States Declaration of Independence
- July 2 - American Revolution: The Second Continental Congress passes the Lee Resolution which asserts that the United Colonies have separated from Great Britain and are now a separate country. The resolution was brought forward by Richard Henry Lee on instructions from his home state of Virginia.
- July 4
  - American Revolution: The United States Declaration of Independence, in which the United States officially declares independence from the British Empire, is approved by the Continental Congress and signed by its president, John Hancock. Signatures of representatives from Connecticut, Delaware, Georgia, Maryland, Massachusetts Bay, New Hampshire, New Jersey, New York, North Carolina, Pennsylvania, Rhode Island, South Carolina and Virginia are added. The text, drafted during June by Benjamin Franklin, is sent for printing.
  - John Rutledge is sworn in as the 31st governor of South Carolina.
  - Josiah Martin ends his term as the ninth and last Governor of the Province of North Carolina and goes into exile.
  - Henry Beeson founds the town of 'Union', later Uniontown, Pennsylvania.
- July 5
  - Patrick Henry is sworn in as the first governor of Virginia.
  - The Fifth Virginia Convention ends at Williamsburg.
- July 8–10 – American Revolution: Battle of Gwynn's Island.
- July 8 – American Revolution: The Liberty Bell rings for the first public reading of the Declaration of Independence at the Pennsylvania State House in Philadelphia.
- July 9 – American Revolution: An angry mob in New York City topples and beheads the equestrian statue of George III in Bowling Green; much of its metal content will be used to make musket balls.
- July 14 – Capture and rescue of Jemima Boone.
- July 15 – American Revolution: Battle of Lindley's Fort.
- July 19 – The Treaty of Watertown is signed in the Edmund Fowle House in the town of Watertown, Massachusetts Bay.
- July 20 – American Revolution: Battle of Island Flats.
- July 29 – Francisco Silvestre Vélez de Escalante, Francisco Atanasio Domínguez, and eight other Spaniards set out from Santa Fe on the Domínguez–Escalante expedition, an eighteen-hundred mile trek through the American Southwest. They are the first Europeans to explore the vast region between the Rockies and the Sierras.

=== August ===
- August 2 – American Revolution: A parchment copy of the Declaration of Independence is signed by 56 members of Congress (not all of whom had been present on July 4).
- August 13 – The New Jersey Legislative Council is elected, with the New Jersey Provincial Council being succeeded into the Legislative Council.
- August 14 – The delegates of Maryland draft the Maryland Constitution of 1776.
- August 15 – American Revolution: First Hessian troops land on Staten Island to join British forces.
- August 23 – The 12th Pennsylvania Regiment is raised at Sunbury, Pennsylvania.
- August 27 – American Revolution:
  - Battle of Long Island: Washington's troops routed in Brooklyn by British under William Howe.
  - The first session of the New Jersey Legislative Council convenes with the Provincial Congress of New Jersey ceasing to function under the New Jersey State Constitution.
- August 31 – William Livingston is sworn in as the first governor of New Jersey.

=== September ===
- September 1 – Invasion of Cherokee Nation by 6,000 patriot troops from Virginia, North Carolina, and South Carolina begins. The troops destroy thirty-six Cherokee towns.
- September 6 – Montgomery County and Washington Counties, Maryland are founded.
- September 7 – American Revolution: World's first submarine attack. American submersible craft Turtle attempts to attach a time bomb to the hull of British Admiral Richard Howe's flagship HMS Eagle in New York Harbor.
- September 9 – The Continental Congress officially names its union of states the United States (previously the United Colonies).
- September 11 – American Revolution: The British and Americans meet at the Staten Island Peace Conference seeking to end the revolution. The meeting is brief and unsuccessful.
- September 15 – American Revolution: Landing at Kip's Bay: British land on Manhattan at Kips Bay.
- September 16
  - American Revolution: Battle of Harlem Heights is fought, and won, making it Washington's first battle field victory.
  - The 7th Maryland Regiment is authorized.
  - The 4th New Jersey Regiment is raised at Elizabethtown, New Jersey
  - The 7th North Carolina Regiment is raised at Halifax, North Carolina.
  - The 11th Pennsylvania Regiment is authorized.
- September 20
  - The Delaware Constitution of 1776 is adopted.
  - The Great Fire of New York (1776) begins, continuing overnight.
- September 22 – American Revolution: Nathan Hale is executed by the British in New York City for espionage.
- September 28 – The Pennsylvania Constitution of 1776 is ratified.

=== October ===
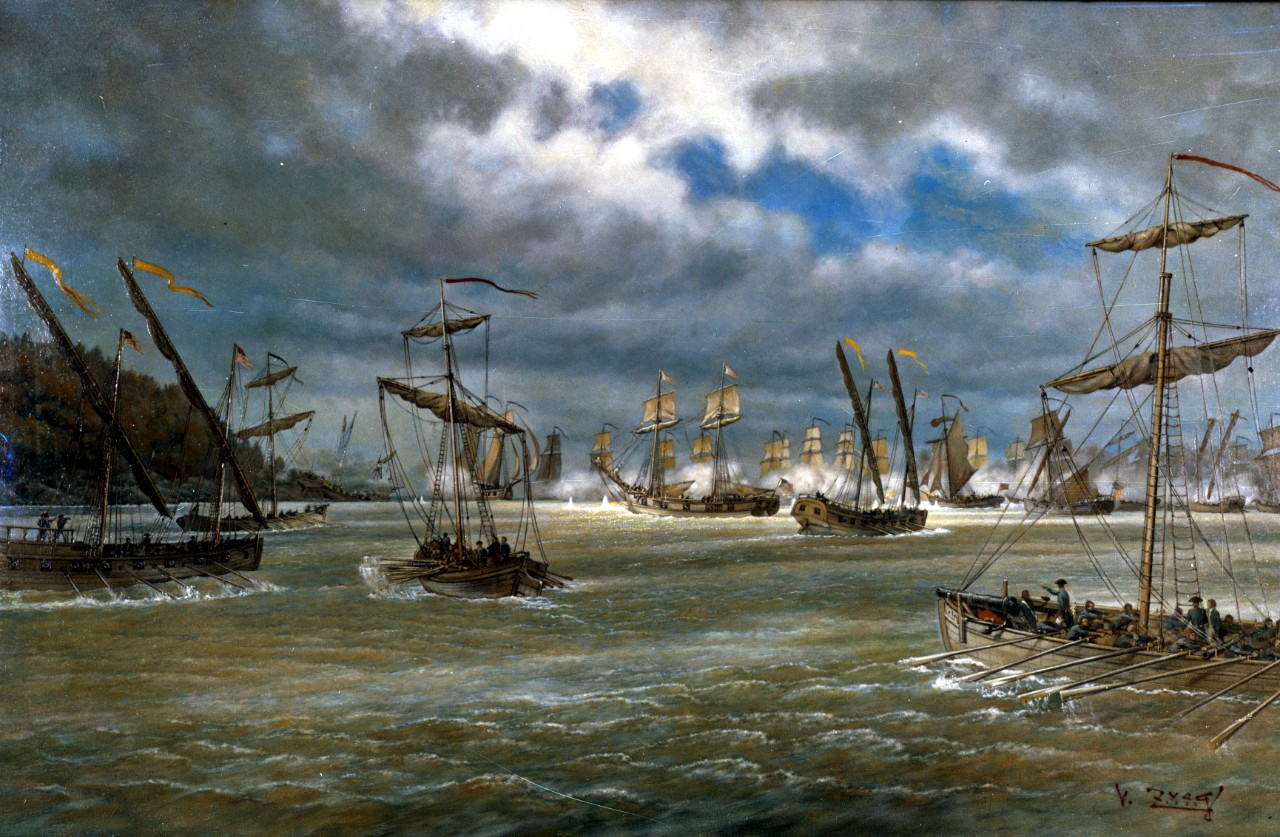
October 11: Battle of Valcour Island

- October 7 – The first session of the 1st Virginia General Assembly convenes.
- October 9
  - Father Francisco Palou founds Mission San Francisco de Asis in what becomes San Francisco, California.
  - Monongalia County, Virginia is formed (now West Virginia).
- October 10 – Johnathan Trumbull is sworn in as the 16th governor of the newly formed state of Connecticut.
- October 11 – American Revolution: Battle of Valcour Island: On Lake Champlain near Valcour Island, a British fleet led by Sir Guy Carleton defeats 15 American gunboats commanded by Brigadier General Benedict Arnold. Although nearly all of Arnold's ships are destroyed, the two-day-long battle will give Patriot forces enough time to prepare defenses of New York City.
- October 17 – The Rutherford Light Horse expedition begins.
- October 18 – American Revolution: Battle of Pell's Point.
- October 20 – The 1st Delaware General Assembly convenes.
- October 22 – American Revolution: Battle of Mamaroneck.
- October 28 – American Revolution: Battle of White Plains: British forces arrive at White Plains, attack and capture Chatterton Hill from the Americans.
- October 31 – In his first speech before British Parliament since the Declaration of Independence that summer, King George III acknowledges that all is not going well for Britain in the war with the United States.

=== November ===
- November – Whitcomb's Rangers is formed at Fort Ticonderoga, New York.
- November 10–28 – American Revolution: Battle of Fort Cumberland.
- November 12 – The first session of the Fifth North Carolina Provincial Congress meets in Halifax, North Carolina with Richard Caswell as president and Cornelius Harnett as vice president.
- November 16
  - American Revolution: Battle of Fort Washington – Hessian forces under Lieutenant General Wilhelm von Knyphausen capture Fort Washington (Manhattan) from the American Continental Army.
  - The Rutherford Light Horse expedition ends.
- November 20 – American Revolution: Battle of Fort Lee – Invasion of New Jersey by British and Hessian forces and subsequent general retreat of the Continental Army.
- November 26 – The 8th North Carolina Regiment is authorized.
- November 28 – The 9th North Carolina Regiment is established.

=== December ===
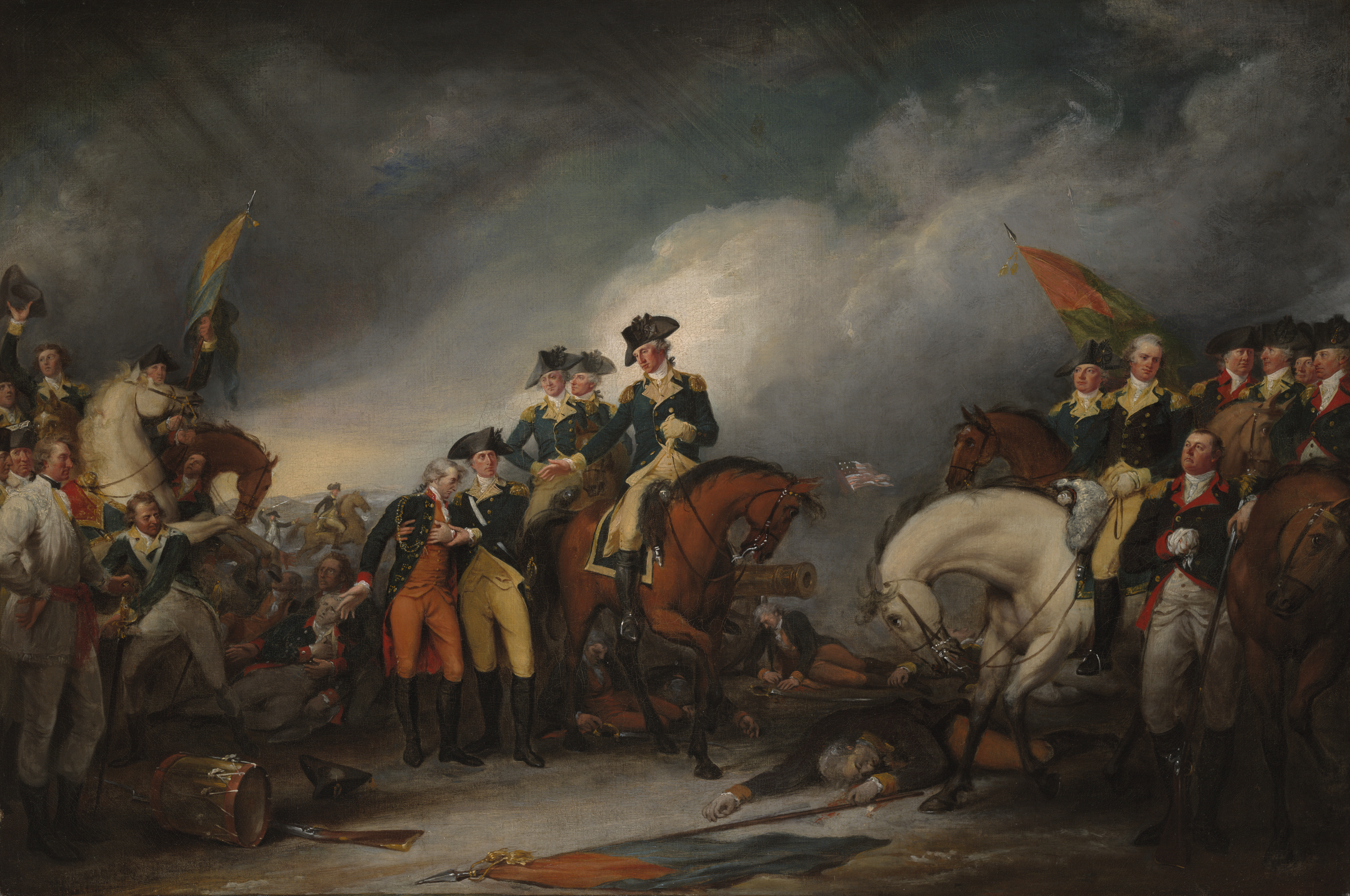
The Capture of the Hessians at Trenton, December 26, 1776 by John Trumbull

- December – The Virginia Legislature incorporates Bath, Virginia (later West Virginia).
- December 5 – Phi Beta Kappa honor society founded at the College of William and Mary.
- December 7 – American Revolution: Marquis de Lafayette attempts to enter the American military as a major general.
- December 14 – American Revolution: Ambush of Geary
- December 19 – American Revolution: Thomas Paine, living with Washington's troops, publishes the first in the series of pamphlets on The American Crisis in The Pennsylvania Journal, opening with the stirring phrase, "These are the times that try men's souls."
- December 21
  - American Revolution: The Royal Colony of North Carolina reorganizes into the State of North Carolina after adopting its own constitution. Richard Caswell becomes the first governor of the newly formed state.
  - The North Carolina Council of State is formed by the constitutional convention of North Carolina.
- December 22–23 – American Revolution: Battle of Iron Works Hill
- December 23 – the first session of the Fifth North Carolina Provincial Congress ends.
- December 25 – American Revolution: At 6 p.m. Gen. George Washington and his troops, numbering 2,400, march to McConkey's Ferry, cross the Delaware River, and land on the New Jersey bank by 3 a.m. the following morning.
- December 26 – American Revolution: Battle of Trenton: Washington's troops surprise the 1500 Hessian troops under the command of Col. Johann Rall at 8 a.m. outside Trenton and score a victory, taking 948 prisoners while suffering only 5 wounded.

=== Undated ===
- The Maryland Court of Appeals, later the Supreme Court of Maryland, is founded by Article 56 of the Maryland Constitution of 1776.
- Fort Clinton is erected by the Continental Army west bank of the Hudson River.
- Fort Defiance is constructed by Nathanael Greene.
- Fort Salonga is built in Fort Salonga, New York.
- Peter Van Brugh Livingston is appointed by the New York Provincial Congress as the first New York State Treasurer.
- Brunswick Town, North Carolina is attacked by British soldiers of the Royal Navy ship Cruizerwho burn most of the town including St. Philip's Church.
- Thoughts on Government is written by John Adams.
- Henry Robason settles in the location that will become Robersonville, North Carolina.
- 'Forks of the Tar' changes to Washington, North Carolina, being named in honor of George Washington.
- Crawford Township, Pennsylvania is settled.
- The Continental Powder Works at French Creek is constructed.
- The Dobbin House Tavern is built in the location which becomes Gettysburg, Pennsylvania.
- The Seal of South Carolina is adopted.
- The Boston Caucus dissolves.
- Garnet Fort later to be Fort Andrew is built.
- Fort Revere is first fortified by Patriot forces.
- Gill, Massachusetts is first settled.
- Hancock, Massachusetts is incorporated and named after John Hancock.
- The Independent Chronicle publishes its first issue.
- North Cemetery is built in Leverett, Massachusetts.
- The House of Burgesses comes to an end.
- Fort Nelson is constructed by Virginia's Revolutionary government.
- Fort Randolph is built in Point Pleasant, Virginia.
- Kentucky County, Virginia is founded.
- Washington County, Virginia is formed by Virginians and named after George Washington.
- The Pennsylvania Provincial Council dissolves.
- The 20th Continental Regiment is established.
- Lookout Place is constructed by British Regulars.

== Births ==
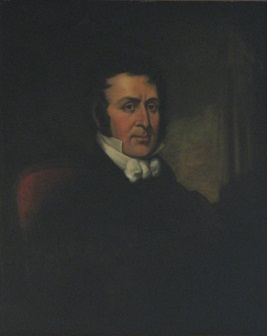
Ethan Allen Brown

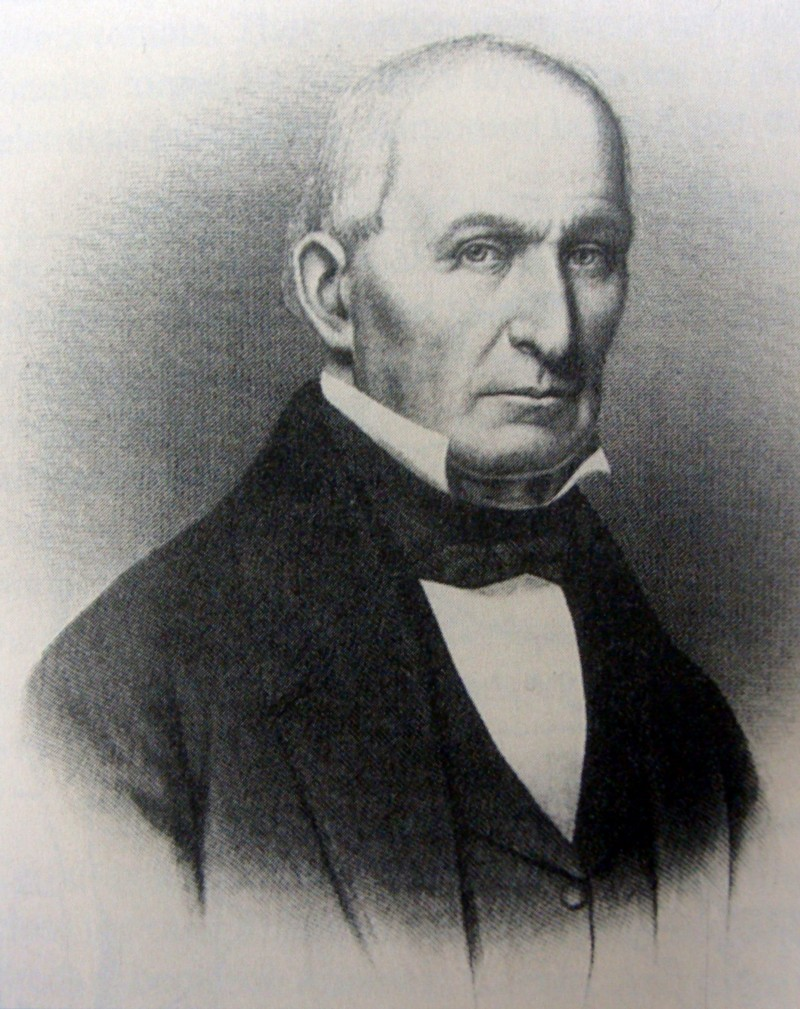
Daniel Dobbins

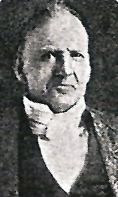
James McSherry

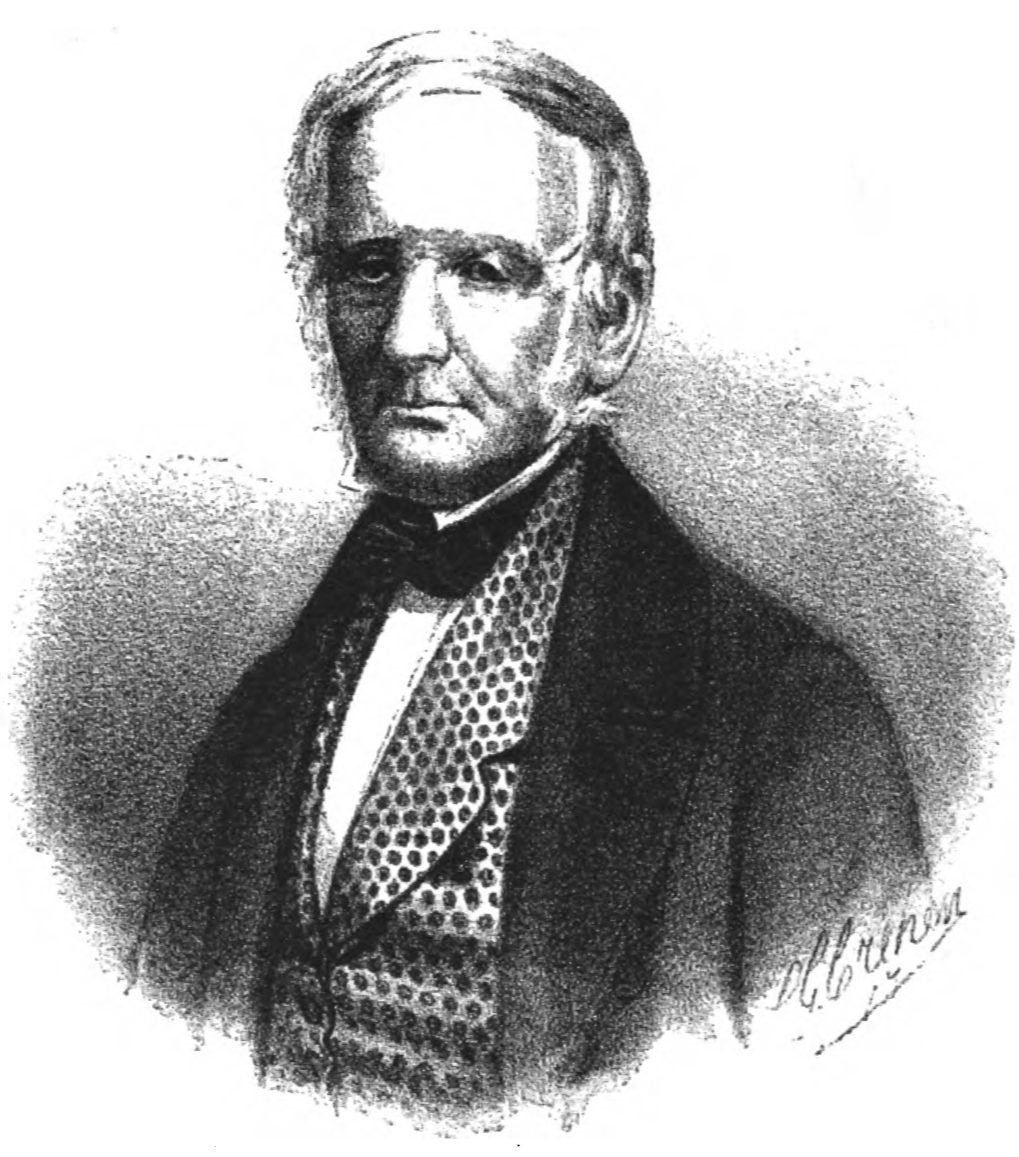
Stephen Whitney

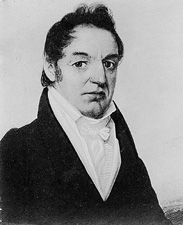
Calvin Willey

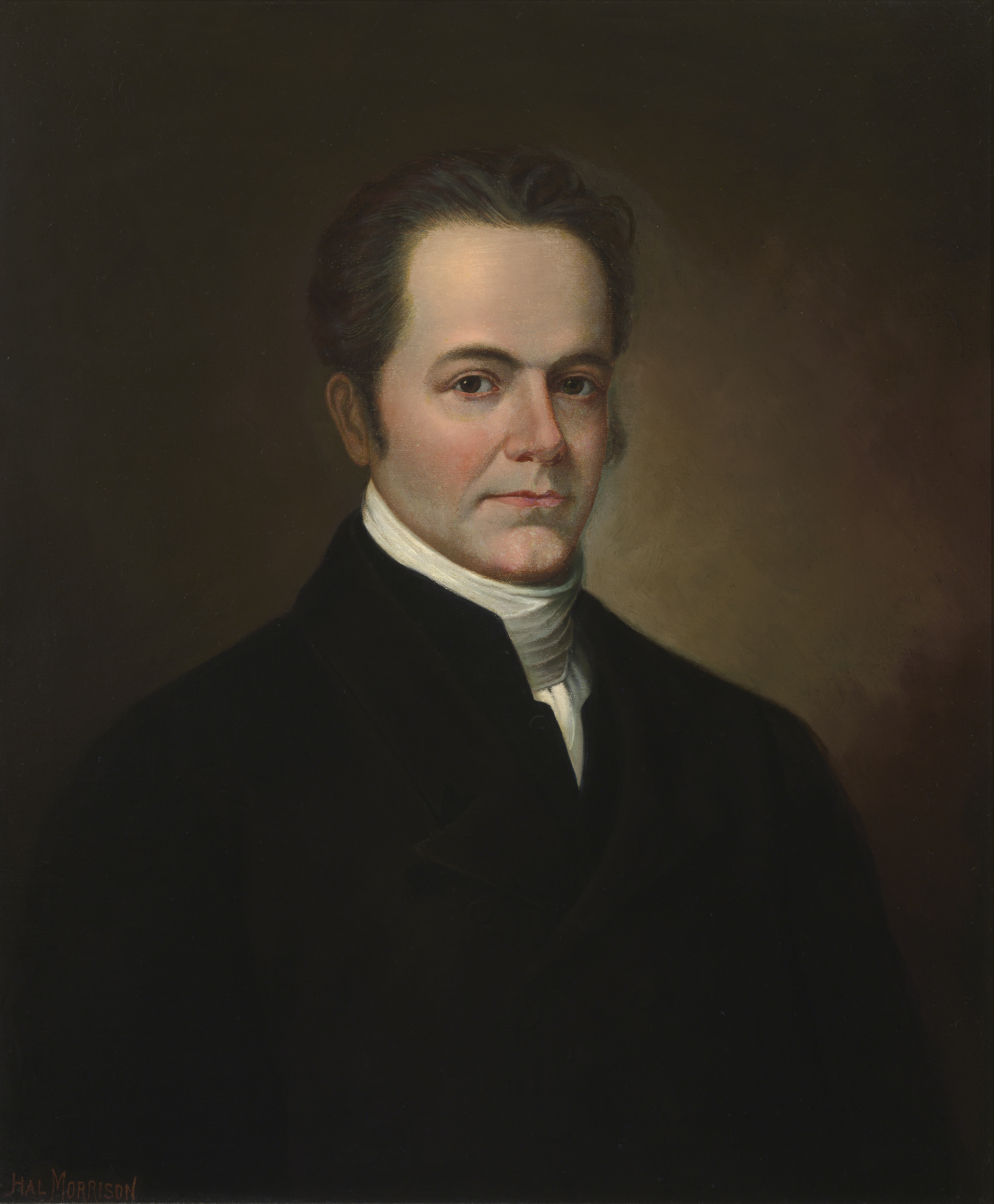
Langdon Cheves

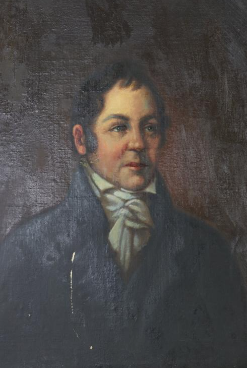
Cowles Mead

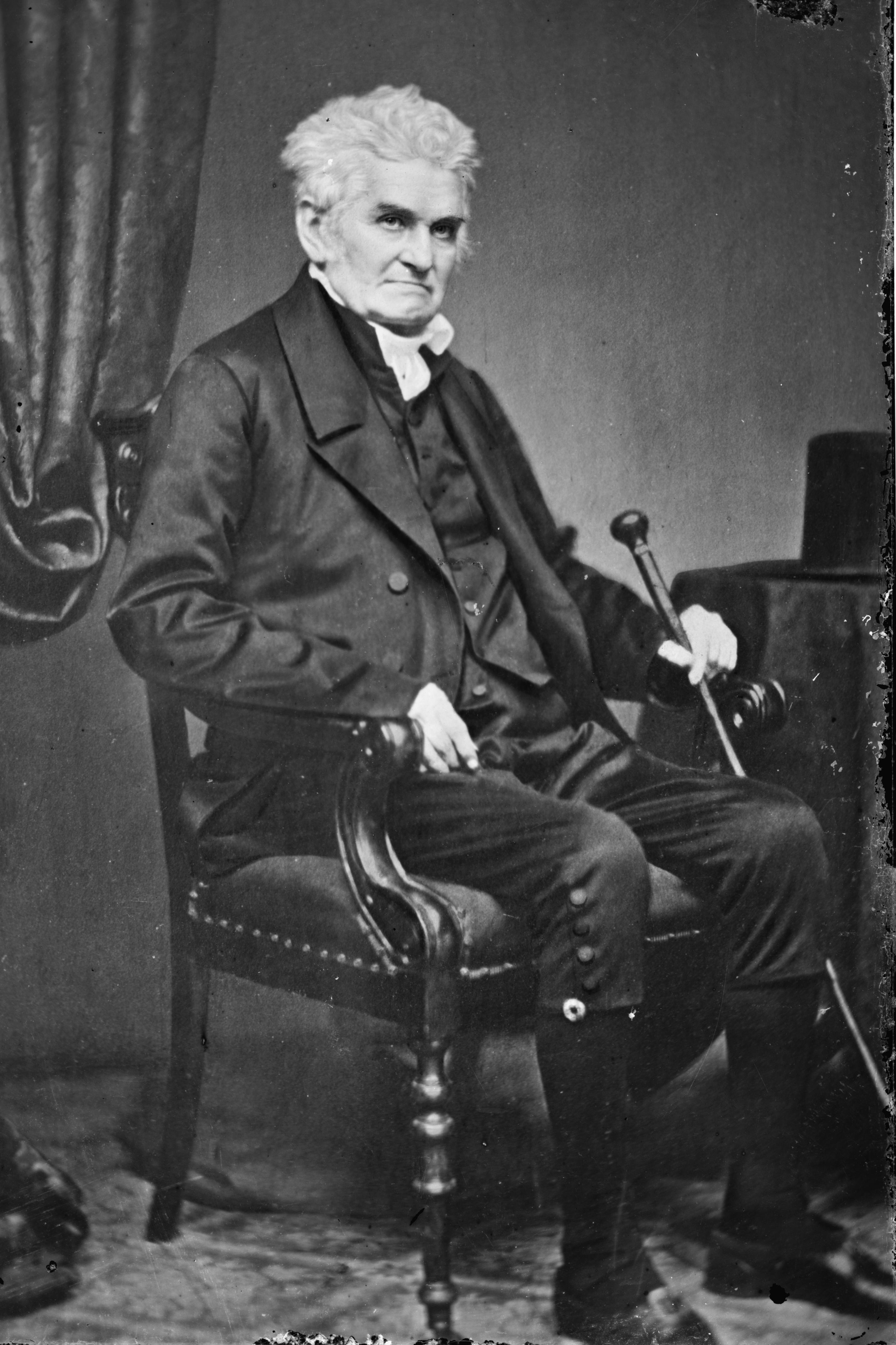
George M. Bibb

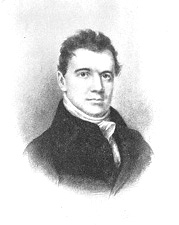
Elijah H. Mills

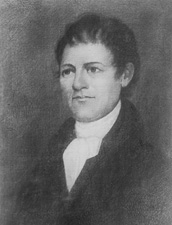
William Logan

John Slater

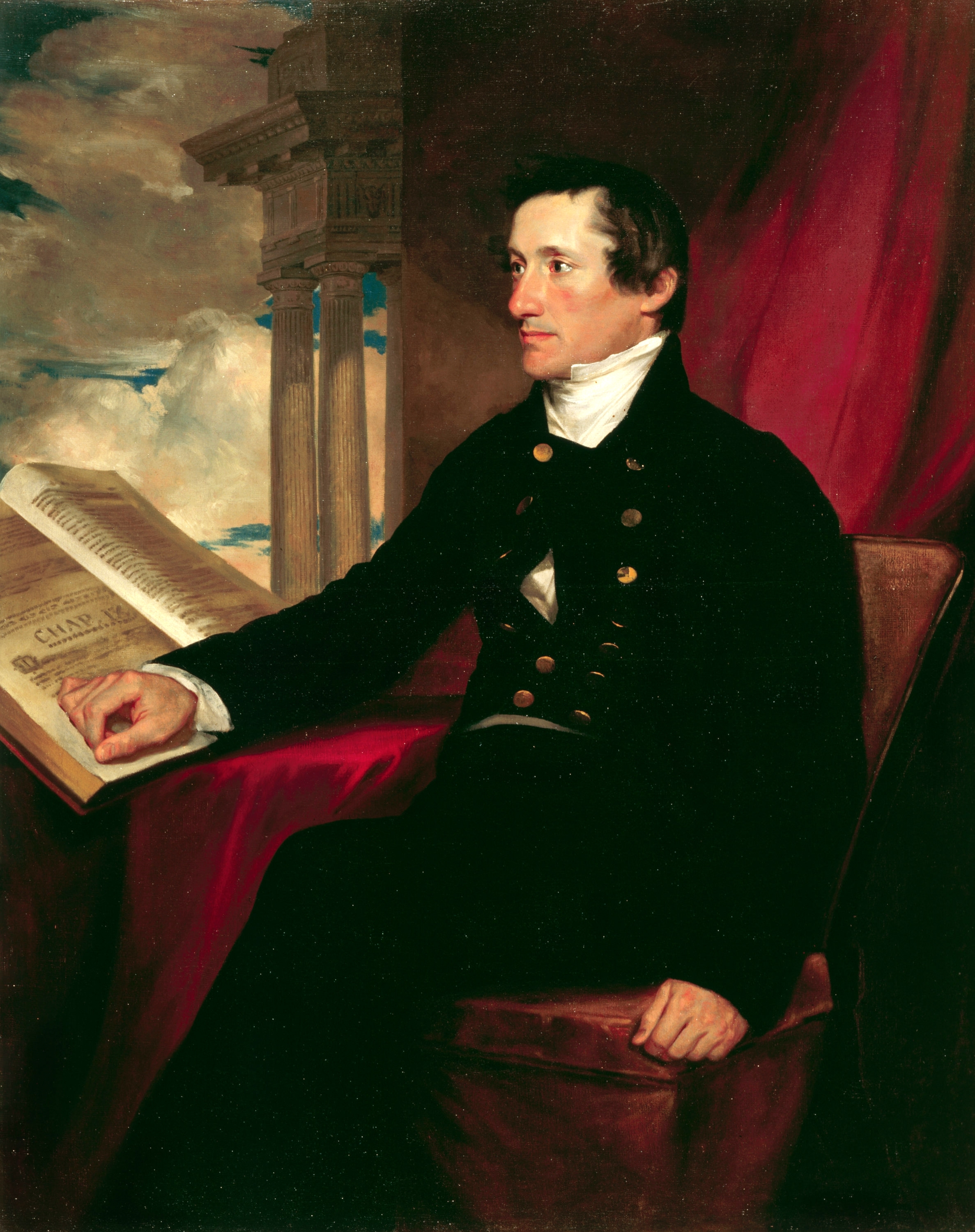
William Drayton
- July 4 – Ethan Allen Brown, politician (died 1852)
- July 5
  - Daniel Dobbins, captain in the U.S. Revenue Cutter Service (died 1856)
  - Bernard Smith, politician (died 1835)
- July 10 – Samuel Powell, politician (died 1841)
- July 29 – James McSherry, politician (died 1849)
- August 13 – Abraham Shepherd, politician (died 1847)
- August 21 – Joseph Healy, politician (died 1861)
- August 26 – Henry A. Livingston, politician (died 1849)
- September 1 – Ezekiel Bacon, politician (died 1870)
- September 4 – Stephen Whitney, merchant (died 1860)
- September 9 – Parmenio Adams, politician (died 1832)
- September 15
  - William Baylies, politician (died 1865)
  - Calvin Willey, U.S. senator from Connecticut from 1825 to 1831 (died 1858)
- September 17 – Langdon Cheves, politician (died 1857)
- October 18 – Cowles Mead, politician (died 1844)
- October 30
  - George M. Bibb, U.S. senator from Kentucky from 1811 to 1814 (died 1859)
  - John Hahn, politician (died 1823)
- October 31 – Francis Locke, politician (died 1823)
- November 1 – Abraham McClellan, politician (died 1851)
- November 7 – Bartow White, politician (died 1862)
- November 10
  - Samuel Gross, politician (died 1839)
  - General Washington Johnston, politician (died 1833)
- December 1
  - Elijah H. Mills, politician (died 1829)
  - Isaac Lacey, politician (died 1844)
- December 7 – Reuben Whallon, politician (died 1843)
- December 8 – William Logan, U.S. senator from Kentucky from 1819 to 1820 (died 1822)
- December 10 – David Marchand, politician (died 1832)
- December 13 – James Hawkes, congressman (died 1865)
- December 25 – John Slater, businessman (died 1843)
- December 30 – William Drayton, politician (died 1846)

== Deaths ==
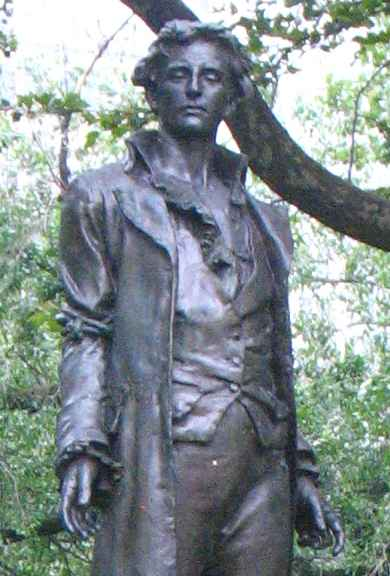
Nathan Hale

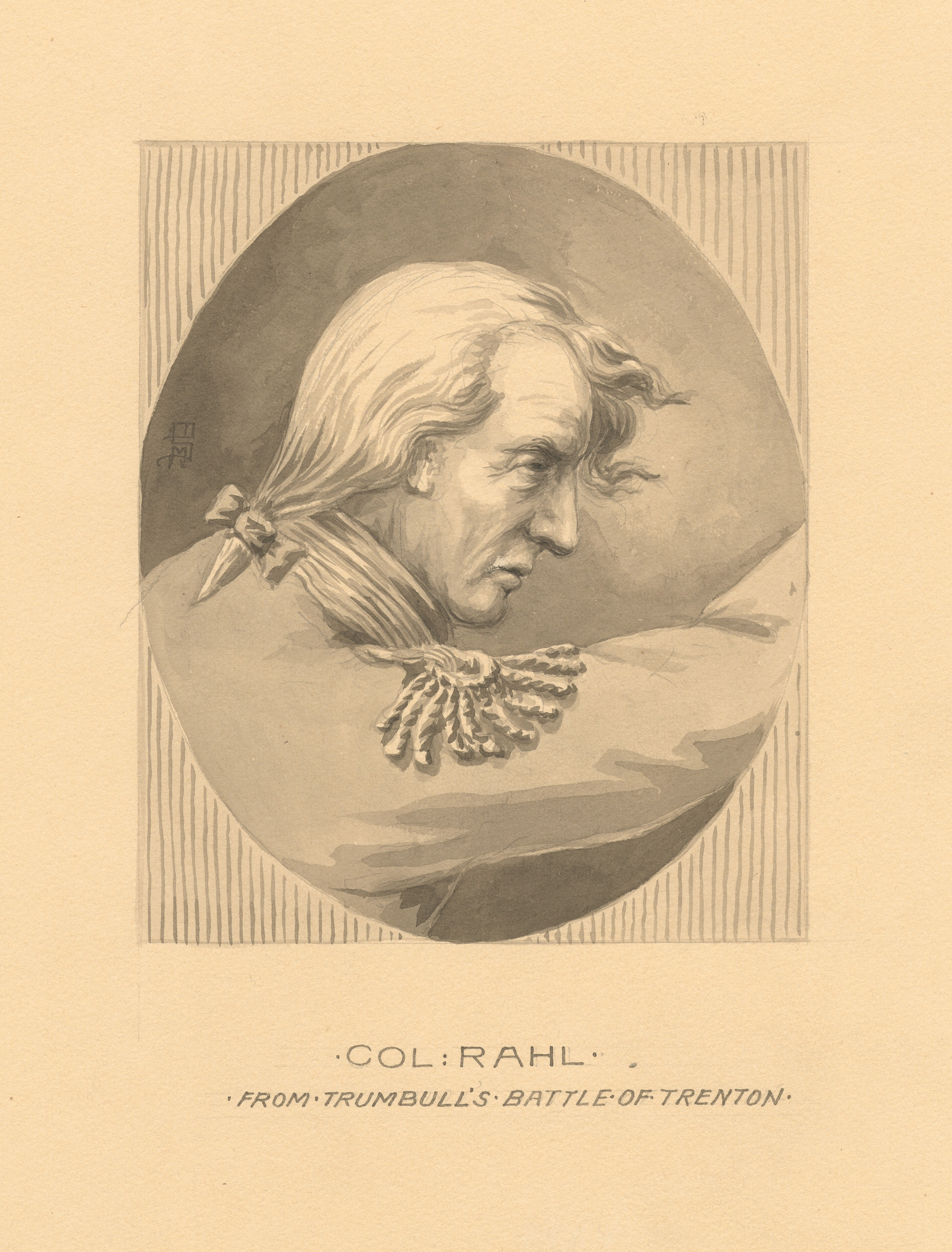
Johann Rall
- August 1 – Francis Salvador, patriot (born 1747)
- September 22 – Nathan Hale, spy (born 1755; executed)
- December 27 – Johann Rall, Hessian colonel (born c. 1726)

== See also ==
- 1776 in Great Britain
- Timeline of the American Revolution (1760–1789)
