= 1779 in the United States =

- Decades: 1770s; 1780s; 1790s
- See also: History of the United States (1776–1789); Timeline of pre-United States history; List of years in the United States

Events from the year 1779 in the United States.

== Incumbents ==
- President of the Second Continental Congress: John Jay (until September 28), Samuel Huntington (starting September 28)

== Events ==
=== January–March ===
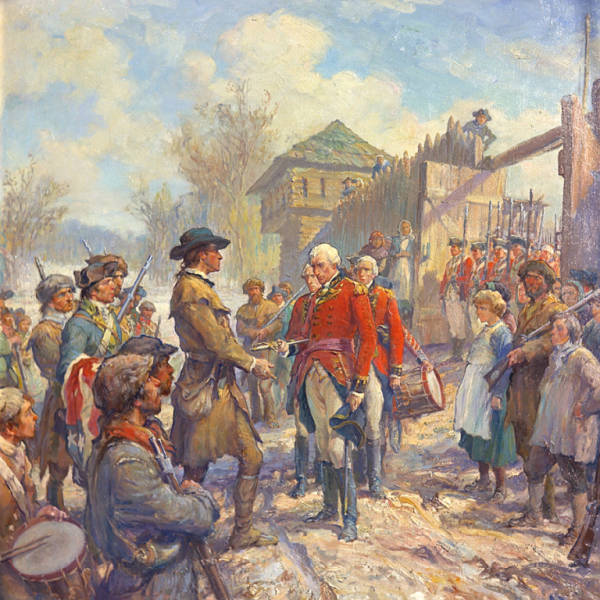
February 23–25: Battle of Vincennes: The Fall of Fort Sackville

- January 22 – American Revolutionary War: Claudius Smith is hanged at Goshen, Orange County, New York for supposed acts of terrorism upon the people of the surrounding communities.
- January 29 – After a second petition for partition from its residents, the North Carolina General Assembly abolishes Bute County, North Carolina (established 1764) by dividing it and naming the northern portion Warren County (for Revolutionary War hero Joseph Warren) and the southern portion Franklin County (for Benjamin Franklin). The General Assembly also establishes Warrenton (also named for Joseph Warren) to be the county seat of Warren County and Louisburg (named for Louis XVI) to be the county seat of Franklin County.
- February 14
  - British Captain James Cook is killed on the Sandwich Islands (later known as the Hawaiian Islands) on his third and last voyage.
  - American Revolutionary War: Battle of Kettle Creek – A Patriot militia decisively defeats and scatters a Loyalist militia that was on its way to British-controlled Augusta, Georgia.
- February 23–25 – American Revolutionary War: Battle of Vincennes.

=== April–June ===
- May 10–24 – American Revolutionary War: Chesapeake raid.
- June 1 – American Revolutionary War: Benedict Arnold is court-martialed for malfeasance in his treatment of government property.
- June 16 – American Revolutionary War: In support of the U.S., Spain declares war on England.
- June 18 – American Revolutionary War: In response to Iroquois and Loyalist attacks, the U.S. launches the Sullivan Expedition with the aim of destroying enemy Iroquois settlements in what is now central New York.

=== July–September ===
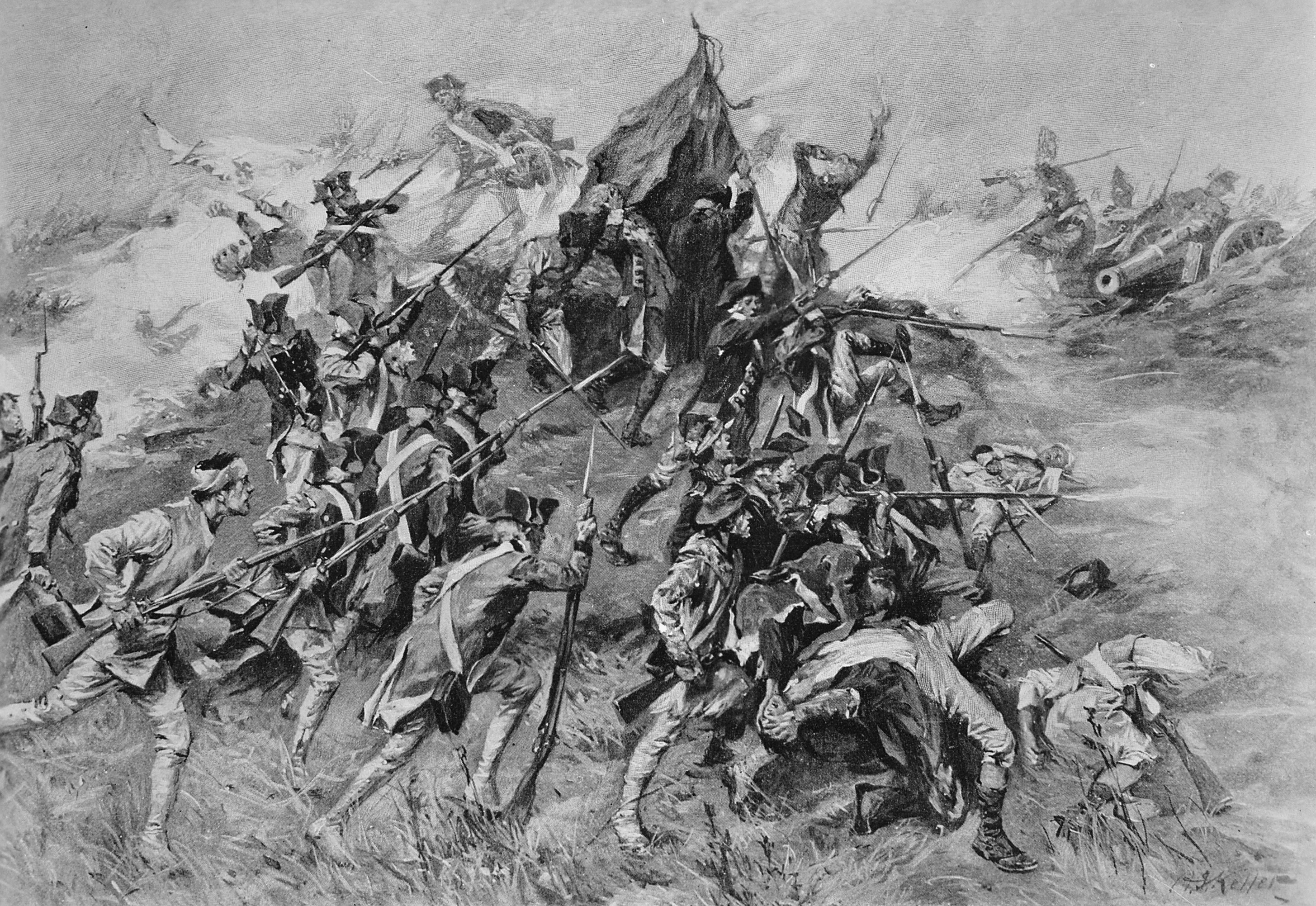
September 16–October 18: Siege of Savannah: American attack on Savannah

- July 16 – American Revolutionary War: Battle of Stony Point, United States forces led by General Anthony Wayne capture Stony Point, New York from British forces.
- July 22 – Battle of Minisink: The Goshen Militia is destroyed by Joseph Brant's forces.
- July 24 – American Revolutionary War: American forces led by Commodore Dudley Saltonstall launch the Penobscot Expedition in what is now Castine, Maine, resulting in the worst naval defeat in U.S. military history until Pearl Harbor.
- September – Battle of Baton Rouge: Spanish troops under Bernardo de Galvez capture the city from the British.
- September 16–October 18 – American Revolutionary War: Siege of Savannah: Franco-American troops make a failed attempt to capture Savannah from the British, suffering heavy casualties.
- September 23 – American Revolution – Battle of Flamborough Head: The American ship Bonhomme Richard, commanded by John Paul Jones, engages the British ship Serapis. Bonhomme Richard sinks, but her crew capture Serapis.

=== October–December ===
- October 4 – The Fort Wilson Riot takes place.
- November 2 – The North Carolina General Assembly carves a new county from Dobbs County, North Carolina and names it Wayne County in honor of United States General Anthony Wayne.
- December 25 – Fort Nashborough, later to become Nashville, Tennessee, is founded by James Robertson.

=== Ongoing ===
- American Revolutionary War (1775–1783)

== Births ==
- January 5
  - Stephen Decatur, U.S. Naval commander (died 1820)
  - Zebulon Pike, General and explorer (died 1813)
- January 23 – Isaac C. Bates, United States Senator from Massachusetts from 1841 till 1845. (died 1845)
- April 11 – Oliver Ames Sr., founder of the Ames Shovel Works (died 1863)
- August 1 – Francis Scott Key, author of The Star Spangled Banner (died 1843)
- August 6 – Henry M. Ridgely, United States Senator from Delaware from 1827 till 1829. (died 1847)
- September 18 – Joseph Story, Associate Justice of the U.S. Supreme Court from 1811 till 1845. (died 1845)
- October – Henry W. Edwards, United States Senator from Connecticut from 1823 till 1838. (died 1847)
- Date unknown – George Poindexter, Governor of Mississippi in 1819 and from 1820 till 1822 and United States Senator from Mississippi from 1830 till 1835. (died 1853)

== Deaths ==
- James Cook February 14, 1779, Explorer and Navigator

== See also ==
- Timeline of the American Revolution (1760–1789)
