= 1778 in the United States =

- Decades: 1770s; 1780s; 1790s
- See also: History of the United States (1776–1789); Timeline of the American Revolution; List of years in the United States

Events from the year 1778 in the United States.

== Incumbents ==
- President of the Second Continental Congress: Henry Laurens (until December 10), John Jay (starting December 10)

== Events ==
=== January–March ===
- January 18 – The third Pacific expedition of Capt. James Cook, with ships HMS Resolution and HMS Discovery, first view O'ahu then Kaua'i in the Hawaiian Islands, which he names the Sandwich Islands.
- February 5 – South Carolina becomes the first state to ratify the Articles of Confederation.
- February 6 – American Revolutionary War: In Paris the Treaty of Alliance and the Treaty of Amity and Commerce are signed by the United States and France, signaling official recognition of the new republic.
- February 23 – American Revolutionary War: Friedrich Wilhelm von Steuben arrives at Valley Forge, Pennsylvania and begins to train the American troops.
- March 18 – American Revolutionary War – Battle of Quinton's Bridge

=== April–June ===
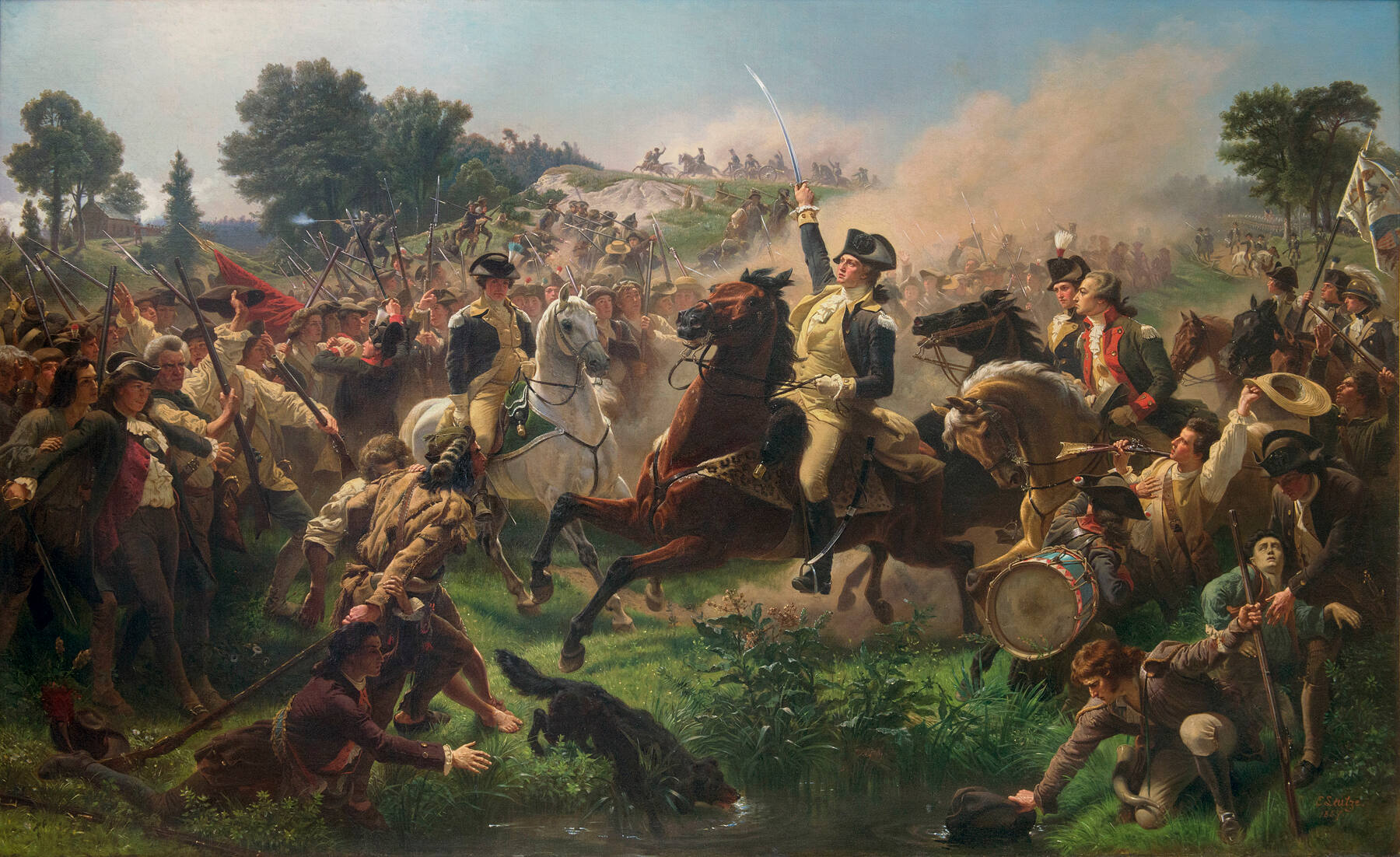
June 28: Battle of Monmouth

- May 1 – American Revolutionary War – Battle of Crooked Billet
- May 17 – American Revolutionary War – Battle of Thomas Creek
- May 20 – American Revolutionary War – Battle of Barren Hill
- May 30 – Benedict Arnold signs U.S. oath of allegiance at Valley Forge.
- June 13 – The Carlisle Peace Commission of British envoys arrive in York, Pennsylvania to present Congress with a peace plan, which Congress swiftly rejects.
- June 24 – A total solar eclipse takes place across parts of the U.S. from Texas to Virginia.
- June 28 – American Revolutionary War – Battle of Monmouth: George Washington's Continental Army battles the British general Sir Henry Clinton's army to a draw near Monmouth, New Jersey.

=== July–September ===
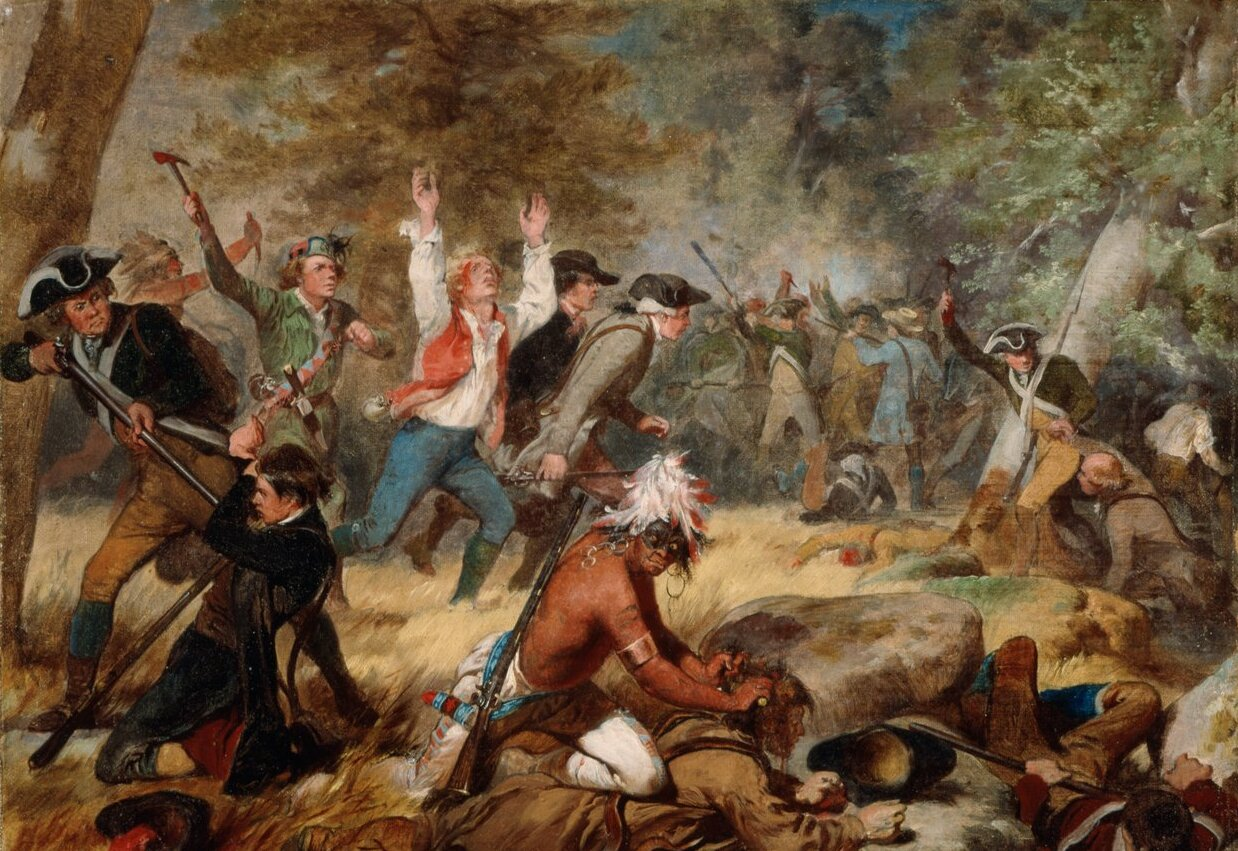
July 3: Battle of Wyoming

- July 3 – American Revolutionary War: the Battle of Wyoming, also known as the Wyoming Massacre, takes place near Wilkes-Barre, Pennsylvania, ending in a terrible defeat for the Americans.
- July 4 – American Revolutionary War: George Rogers Clark takes Kaskaskia.
- July 27 – American Revolution – First Battle of Ushant: British and French fleets fight to a standoff.
- August 29 – American Revolutionary War: The Battle of Rhode Island takes place when the Continental Army attempts to retake Aquidneck Island from the British.
- September – The Massachusetts Banishment Act, providing punishment for Loyalists, is passed.
- September 17 – The Treaty of Fort Pitt is signed, the first formal treaty between the United States and a Native American tribe (the Lenape or Delaware).
- September 19 – The Continental Congress passes the first budget of the United States.

=== October–December ===
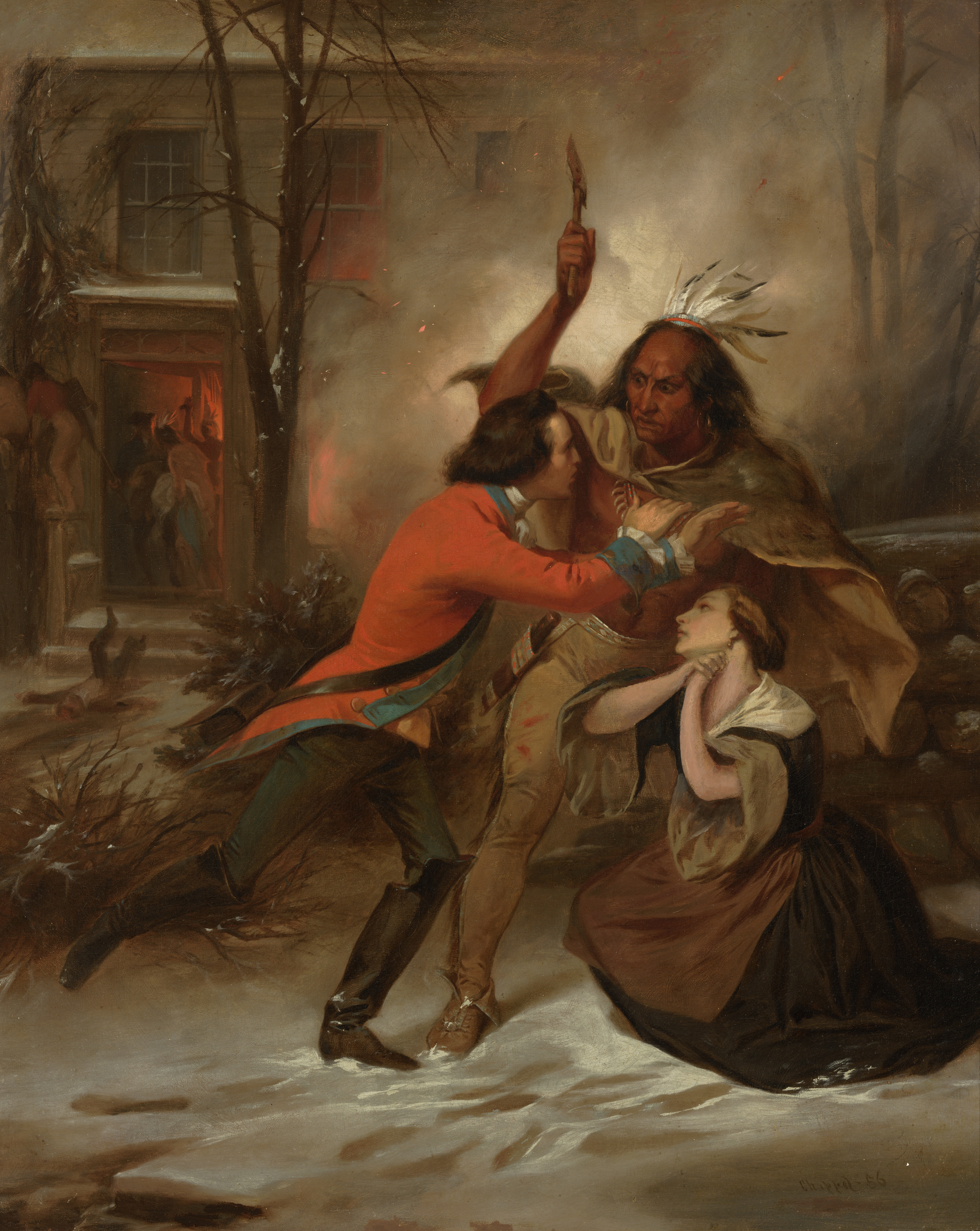
November 11: Cherry Valley massacre

- October 6 – American Revolutionary War – Battle of Chestnut Neck
- November 11 – American Revolutionary War: Cherry Valley massacre – British forces and their Iroquois allies attack a fort and the village of Cherry Valley, New York, killing 14 soldiers and 30 civilians.
- November 26 – In the Hawaiian Islands, Capt. James Cook becomes the first European to land on Maui.
- November 30 – American Revolutionary War: Continental Army in winter quarters at Middlebrook Cantonment, New Jersey.

=== Undated ===
- The first settlement is made in the area of what is now Louisville, Kentucky by 13 families under Colonel George Rogers Clark.
- Phillips Academy, a prestigious secondary boarding school in the United States, is founded by Samuel Phillips Jr.
- The term "thoroughbred" is first used in the United States in an advertisement in a Kentucky gazette to describe a New Jersey stallion called Pilgarlick.

=== Ongoing ===
- American Revolutionary War (1775–1783)
- Slavery in the United States

== Births ==
- January 6 – Thomas Lincoln, farmer and father of President Abraham Lincoln (died 1851)
- February 22 – Rembrandt Peale, artist and museum keeper (died 1860)
- April 11 – John Johnson, early leader in the Latter Day Saint movement in Ohio (died 1843)
- April 27 – Gideon Lee, politician (died 1841)
- May 3 – David Wilder, Jr., politician (died 1866)
- May 15 – Enoch Fenwick, Jesuit priest (died 1827)
- August 1
  - John Collins Warren, magazine founder (died 1856)
  - Mary Jefferson Eppes, Thomas Jefferson's younger child (died 1804)
- August 2
  - Jabez Delano Hammond, politician (died 1855)
  - Robert Richford Roberts, bishop (died 1843)
- August 3 – Jessup Nash Couch, politician (died 1821)
- August 4 – John Hunter, politician (died 1852)
- August 15 – John Tanner, early Mormon leader (died 1850)
- August 18 – Silas Condit, politician (died 1861)
- August 26 – John Adams, United States House of Representatives member (died 1854)
- August 27 – Mary Whitmer, Book of Mormon witness (died 1856)

== Deaths ==
- June 12 – Philip Livingston, merchant and statesman from New York City (born 1716)
- November 11 – 30 people in the Cherry Valley massacre
- June 15 - William Henry Ferrell (born 1740) "killed by Indians in New Garden Settlement, Washington, Virginia, United States" Source: Ancestry.com

== See also ==
- Timeline of the American Revolution (1760–1789)
