= 1781 in the United States =

- Decades: 1770s; 1780s; 1790s; 1800s
- See also: History of the United States (1776–1789); Timeline of the American Revolution; List of years in the United States

Events from the year 1781 in the United States. This year marked the beginning of government under the Articles of Confederation as well as the surrender of British armed forces in the American Revolution.

== Incumbents ==
- President of the Second Continental Congress: Samuel Huntington (until February 28)
- President of the Continental Congress:
  - March 1-July 6: Samuel Huntington
  - July 10-November 5: Thomas McKean
  - starting November 5: John Hanson

== Events ==
=== January-March ===
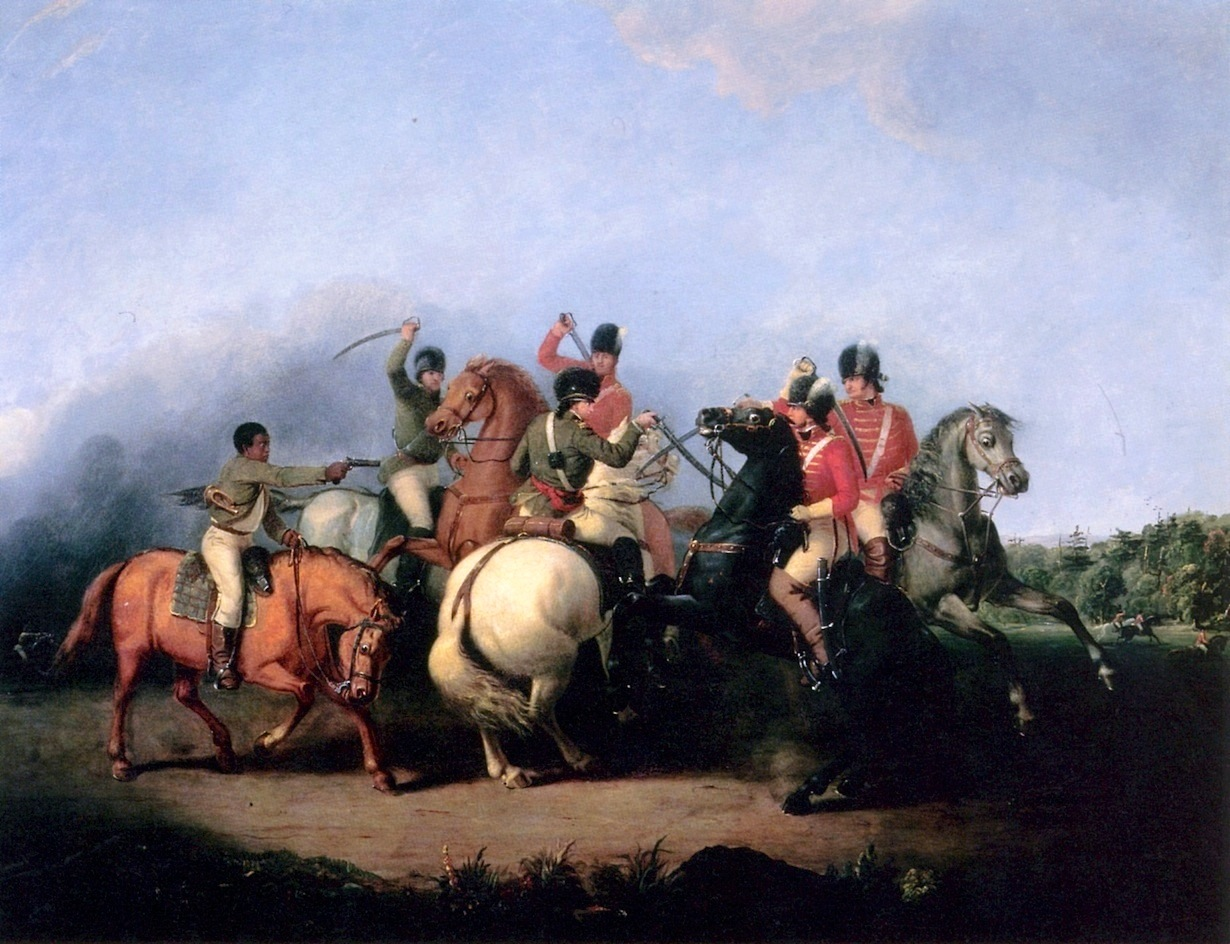
January 17: Battle of Cowpens

- January 2 – Virginia passes a law ceding its western land claims, paving the way for Maryland to ratify the Articles of Confederation.
- January 5 – American Revolution – Richmond, Virginia is burned by British naval forces led by Benedict Arnold.
- January 17 – American Revolution – Battle of Cowpens: Americans under Daniel Morgan defeat British forces.
- January 20 – Pompton Mutiny
- February 2 – The Articles of Confederation are ratified by Maryland, the 13th and final state to do so.
- February 24 – Pyle's Massacre
- March 1 – The United States Continental Congress implements the Articles of Confederation, forming its Perpetual Union as the United States in Congress Assembled.
- March 8 – American Revolution – Skirmish at Waters Creek
- March 15 – American Revolution – Battle of Guilford Court House: American General Nathanael Greene loses to the British.
- March 16 – American Revolution – Battle of Cape Henry

=== April–June ===
- April 25
  - American Revolution – Battle of Blandford
  - American Revolution – Battle of Hobkirk's Hill
- April 27 – American Revolution – Action at Osborne's
- May 22 - June 6 – American Revolution – Siege of Augusta
- May 22 - June 19 – American Revolutionary War – Siege of Ninety-Six
- May 26 – Bank of North America is chartered by the Confederation Congress.
- June 3 – American Revolution – Jack Jouett begins a "midnight ride" to warn Thomas Jefferson and the Virginia legislature of approaching British cavalry led by Banastre Tarleton who have been sent to capture them
- June 26 – American Revolution – Battle of Spencer's Ordinary

=== July–September ===
- July 6 – American Revolution – Battle of Green Spring
- July 9–24 – American Revolution – Francisco's Fight
- July 29 – American Revolution – Skirmish at the House in the Horseshoe: A Tory force under David Fanning attacks Phillip Alston's smaller force of Whigs at Alston's home in Cumberland County, North Carolina (in present-day Moore County, North Carolina). Alston's troops surrender after Fanning's men attempt to ram the house with a cart of burning straw.
- August 19 – Congress passes an act saying they will recognize the secessionist state of Vermont (formed in 1777 by unilateral separation from New York) and agree to admit that state to the Union if Vermont will renounce its claims to territory east of the Connecticut River and west of Lake Champlain. (The following spring the Vermont legislature agreed, but nonetheless New York continued to block its admission until 1791.)
- August 30 – American Revolution: A French fleet under Comte de Grasse enters Chesapeake Bay, cutting British General Charles Cornwallis off from escape by sea.
- September 4 – Los Angeles is founded as El Pueblo de Nuestra Señora La Reina de Los Ángeles de Porciuncula (City of Our Lady the Queen of the Angels of Porciuncula) by a group of 44 Spanish settlers.
- September 5 – American Revolution – Battle of the Chesapeake: A British fleet under Thomas Graves arrives and fights de Grasse, but is unable to break through to relieve the Siege of Yorktown.
- September 6 – American Revolution – Battle of Groton Heights: British forces under Benedict Arnold attack a fort in Groton, Connecticut, achieving a strategic victory.
- September 8 – American Revolution – Battle of Eutaw Springs
- September 10 – American Revolution: Graves gives up trying to break through the now-reinforced French fleet and returns to New York, leaving Cornwallis to his fate.
- September 28 – American Revolution: American and French troops begin a siege of the British at Yorktown, Virginia.

=== October–December ===
- October 19 – American Revolution: Following the Siege of Yorktown, General Cornwallis surrenders to General George Washington at Yorktown, Virginia, ending the armed struggle of the American Revolution.
- November 5 – John Hanson is elected President of the Continental Congress.
- December – A school is founded in Washington County, Pennsylvania that would later be known as Washington & Jefferson College.

=== Undated ===
- Reverend Samuel Peters publishes his General History of Connecticut, using the term blue law for the first time.
- Meeting in Paris, Benjamin Franklin invites Princess Yekaterina Vorontsova-Dashkova to become the first woman member of the American Philosophical Society.

=== Ongoing ===
- American Revolutionary War (1775–1783)
- Articles of Confederation in effect (1781–1788)

== Births ==
- August 23 – John M. Berrien, United States Senator from Georgia from 1841 till 1852. (died 1856)
- August 28 – Hannah Tompkins, wife of Daniel D. Tompkins, Second Lady of the United States (died 1829)
- October 1 – James Lawrence, U.S. Navy officer (died 1813)
- October 2 – William Wyatt Bibb, United States Senator from Georgia from 1813 till 1816, 1st Governor of Alabama (died 1820)

== Deaths ==
- February 28 - Richard Stockton, signatory of the Declaration of Independence (born 1730)

== See also ==
- Timeline of the American Revolution (1760–1789)
