= 1780 in the United States =

- Decades: 1770s; 1780s; 1790s; 1800s
- See also: History of the United States (1776–1789); Timeline of the American Revolution; List of years in the United States

Events from the year 1780 in the United States.

== Incumbents ==
- President of the Second Continental Congress: Samuel Huntington

== Events ==
=== January–March ===
- January 16 – American Revolutionary War: Battle of Cape St. Vincent – British Admiral Sir George Rodney defeats a Spanish fleet
- February 3 – American Revolutionary War: Battle of Young's House
- March 1 – The Pennsylvania General Assembly passes An Act for the Gradual Abolition of Slavery, prohibiting the further importation of adults and children into the Commonwealth for the purposes of enslaving them
- March 29–May 12 – American Revolutionary War: Siege of Charleston

=== April–June ===
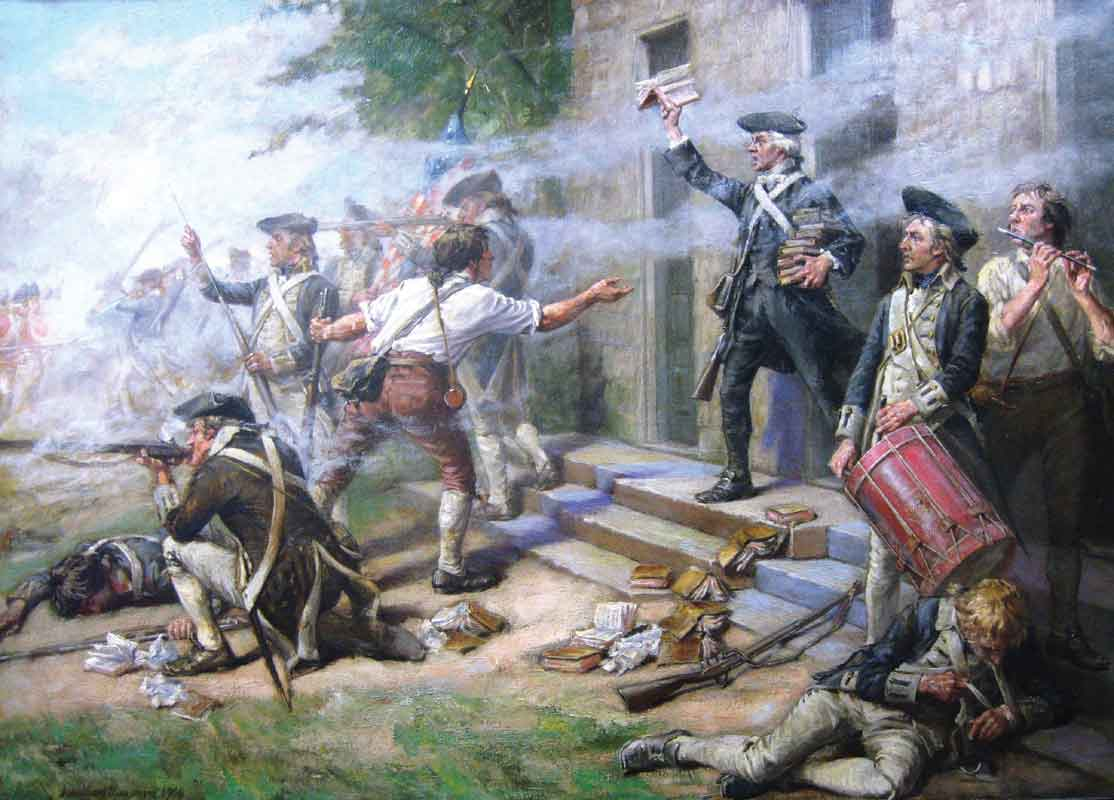
June 23: Battle of Springfield

- April 14 – American Revolutionary War: Battle of Monck's Corner
- May 6 – American Revolutionary War: Battle of Lenud's Ferry
- May 12 – American Revolutionary War: Charleston, South Carolina is taken by British forces.
- May 13 – Cumberland Compact signed by American settlers in the Cumberland Valley of Tennessee.
- May 19 – New England's Dark Day: An unaccountable darkness spreads over New England, regarded by some observers as a fulfillment of Bible prophecy.
- May 25–August 4 – American Revolutionary War: Bird's invasion of Kentucky
- May 29 – American Revolutionary War: Waxhaw Massacre: Loyalist forces under Col. Banastre Tarleton kill surrendering American soldiers.
- June 7 – American Revolutionary War: Battle of Connecticut Farms
- June 10 – American Revolutionary War: Battle of Mobley's Meeting House
- June 20 – American Revolutionary War: Battle of Ramsour's Mill
- June 23 – American Revolutionary War – Battle of Springfield: The American victory at Springfield effectively ends British ambitions in New Jersey.

=== July–September ===
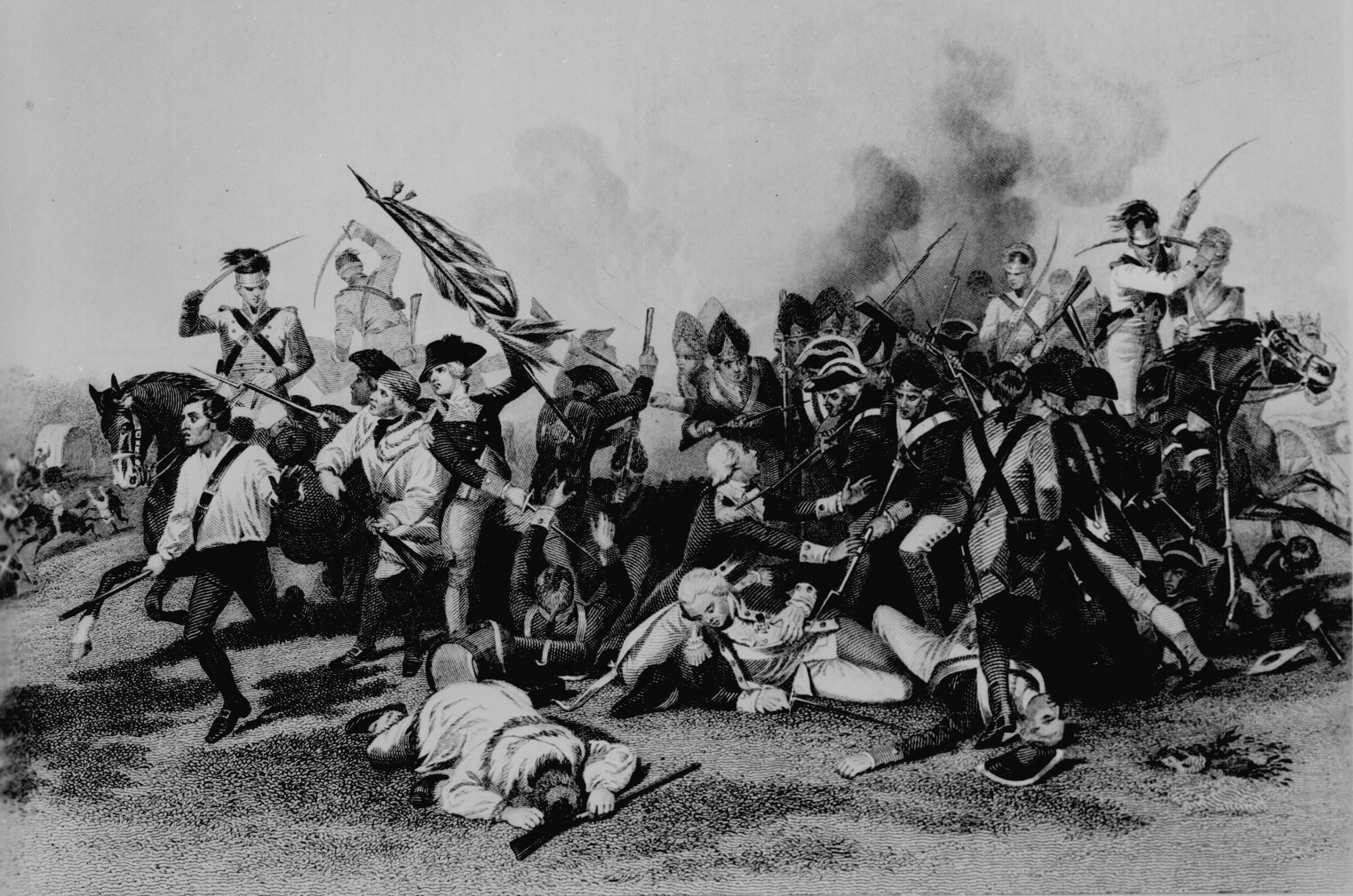
August 16: Battle of Camden

- July 11 – Expédition Particulière: French soldiers arrive in Newport, Rhode Island to reinforce colonists in the American Revolutionary War.
- July 12 – American Revolutionary War: Battle of Williamson's Plantation
- July 21 – American Revolutionary War: Battle of Colson's Mill
- August 1 – American Revolutionary War: Battle of Rocky Mount
- August 6 – American Revolutionary War: Battle of Hanging Rock
- August 8 – American Revolutionary War: Battle of Piqua
- August 16 – American Revolutionary War: Battle of Camden: British troops inflict heavy losses on a Patriot army at Camden, South Carolina.
- August 18
  - American Revolutionary War: Battle of Fishing Creek
  - American Revolutionary War: Battle of Musgrove Mill
- August 28 – American Revolutionary War: Battle of Black Mingo
- September 21
  - American Revolutionary War: Battle of Wahab's Plantation
  - Benedict Arnold gives detailed plans of West Point to Major John André. Three days later, André is captured with papers revealing that Arnold was planning to surrender West Point to the British.
- September 25 – Benedict Arnold flees to British-held New York.
- September 26 – American Revolutionary War: Battle of Charlotte

=== October–December ===
October 7: Battle of Kings Mountain

- October 2 – American Revolutionary War: In Tappan, New York, British spy John André is hanged by American forces.
- October 7 – American Revolutionary War – Battle of Kings Mountain: Patriot militia forces annihilate a Loyalists under British Major Patrick Ferguson at Kings Mountain in South Carolina.
- October 9 – Great Hurricane of 1780: The deadliest Atlantic Hurricane in recorded history
- October 16 – American Revolutionary War – Royalton Raid
- October 17 – American Revolutionary War – Battle of Shallow Ford
- October 19 – American Revolutionary War – Battle of Klock's Field
- October 25
  - American Revolutionary War – Battle of Tearcoat Swamp
  - John Hancock is sworn in as the first governor of Massachusetts.
- November 9 – American Revolutionary War – Battle of Fishdam Ford
- November 20 – American Revolutionary War – Battle of Blackstock's Farm

=== Undated ===
- Woodford Reserve bourbon whiskey distillery begins operation in Kentucky.

=== Ongoing ===
- American Revolutionary War (1775–1783)

== Births ==
- January 14 – Henry Baldwin, Associate Justice of the Supreme Court of the U.S. from 1830 to 1844 (died 1844)
- January 30 – Israel Pickens, U.S. Senator from Alabama from 1821 to 1825 (died 1827)
- February 1 – David Porter, naval officer (died 1843)
- February 19 – Richard McCarty, politician (died 1844)
- March 1 – Oliver C. Comstock, U.S. representative from New York (died 1860)
- March 6 – Lucy Barnes, religious writer (died 1809)
- March 20 – Thomas Metcalfe, U.S. Senator from Kentucky from 1848 to 1849 (died 1855)
- March 25 – Joseph Ritner, politician (died 1869)
- April 4 – Edward Hicks, painter (died 1849)
- April 7 – William Ellery Channing, influential Unitarian theologian and minister (died 1842)
- May 1 – John McKinley, U.S. Senator from Alabama from 1826 to 1831 and in 1837; Associate Justice of the Supreme Court of the U.S. from 1837 to 1852 (died 1852)
- June 21 – Martin D. Hardin, U.S. Senator from Kentucky from 1816 to 1817 (died 1823)
- July 9 – Ephraim Bateman, U.S. Senator from New Jersey from 1826 to 1829 (died 1829)
- August 20 – William Woodbridge, Governor of Michigan from 1840 to 1841 and U.S. Senator from Michigan from 1841 to 1847 (died 1861)
- August 29 – Richard Rush, U.S. Attorney General under James Madison; U.S. Secretary of the Treasury under John Q. Adams (died 1859)
- September 8 – George Troup, U.S. Senator from Georgia from 1816 to 1818 and from 1829 to 1833 (died 1856)
- October 17 – Richard Mentor Johnson, U.S. Senator from Kentucky from 1819 to 1829 and 9th vice president of the United States from 1837 to 1841 (died 1850)
- October 22 – John Forsyth, U.S. Senator from Georgia from 1818 to 1819 and from 1829 to 1834 (died 1841)
- October 25
  - Philip Hone, Mayor of New York City from 1826 to 1827 (died 1851)
  - Freeman Walker, U.S. Senator from Georgia from 1819 to 1821 (died 1827)
- November 8 – Samuel A. Foote, Governor of Connecticut from 1834 to 1835; U.S. Senator from Connecticut from 1827 to 1833 (died 1846)
- December 31 – Gideon Tomlinson, U.S. Senator from Connecticut from 1831 to 1837 (died 1854)
- William Cardell, grammarian and story writer for boys (died 1828)

== Deaths ==
- January 31 – Jonathan Carver, explorer (born 1710)
- June 3 – Thomas Hutchinson, last governor of Massachusetts Bay Colony (born 1711)
- August 19 – Johann de Kalb, Franconian-French major general in the Continental Army, mortally wounded in Battle of Camden (born 1721 in Principality of Bayreuth)
- September 8 – Enoch Poor, brigadier general in the Continental Army (born 1736)
- October 2 – John André, British Army officer, hanged as a spy by the Continental Army (born 1750 in Great Britain)
- Joseph Green, poet, satirist and clergyman (born 1706)

== See also ==
- Timeline of the American Revolution (1760–1789)
