= Artisan's House =

Historic house in Maryland

- U.S. National Register of Historic Places
- U.S. Historic district – Contributing property
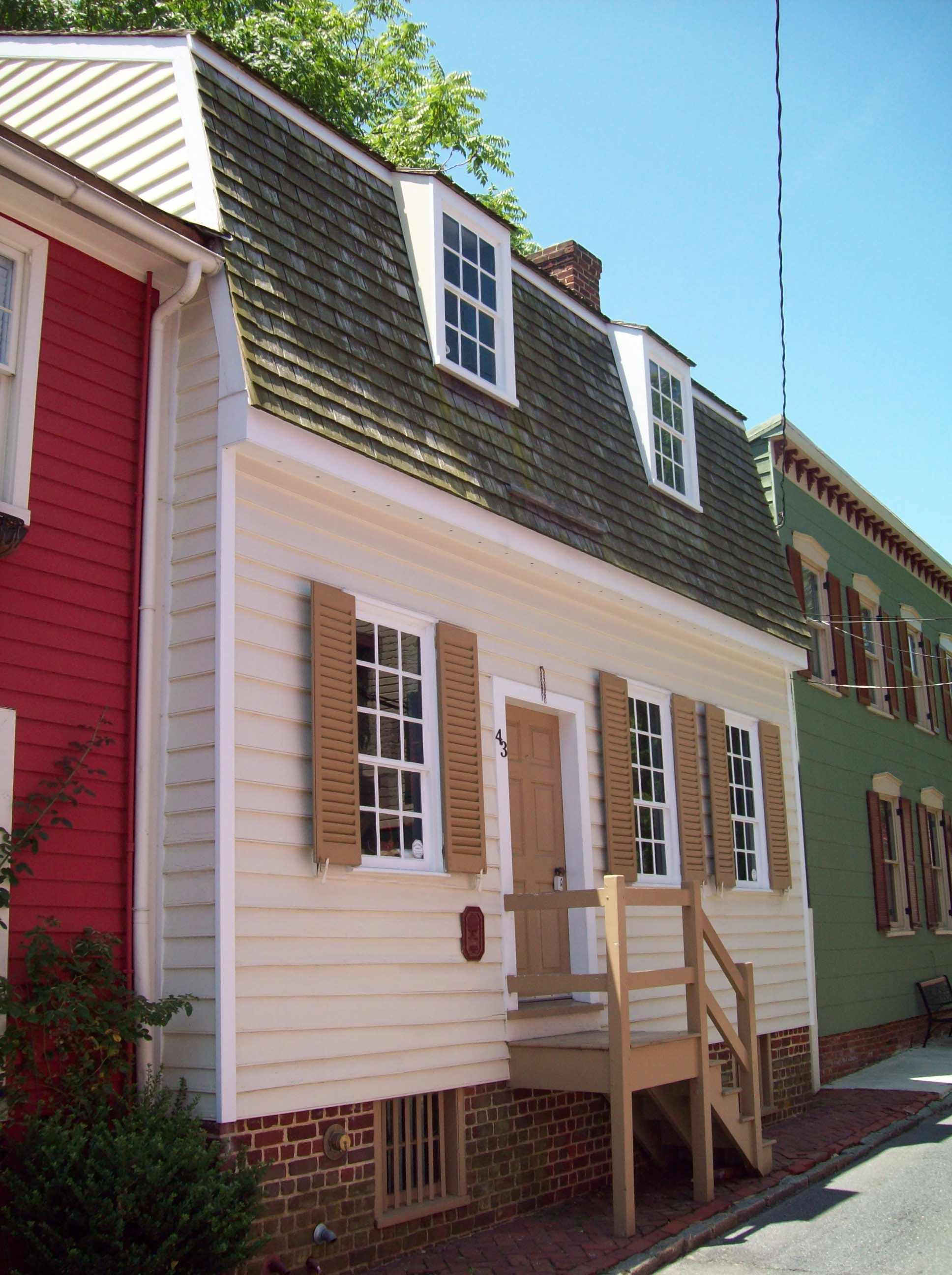
- Hogshead (Artisan's House), July 2009

- Location within Maryland Location within the United States
- Location: 43 Pinckney St., Annapolis, Maryland
- Coordinates: 38°58′43.4″N 76°29′17.1″W
- Built: 1777
- NRHP reference No.: 72000564
- Added to NRHP: November 29, 1972

Artisan's House is a historic home located at Annapolis, Maryland, United States. It is a 1 1/2-story frame house on a brick foundation representative of modest middle class dwellings of the 18th century. It was likely used as a barracks during the Revolutionary War. Because of this, it is also known as "Hogshead."

It was listed on the National Register of Historic Places in 1973, and it is a contributing property in the Colonial Annapolis Historic District.

Hogshead is owned by the Historic Annapolis Foundation and operated as an 18th-century period historic house museum with Colonial-era re-enactors.
