= Henry Howard Brownell =

American poet and historian

Henry Howard Brownell (February 6, 1820 – 1872) was an American poet and historian who wrote prominently about the American Civil War as a member of the Union navy and the private secretary of Admiral David Farragut.

== Early life and education ==
Brownell was born in Providence, Rhode Island on February 6, 1820. He graduated from Trinity College (then called Washington College) in Hartford, Connecticut in 1841. Brownell may have initially moved to Alabama to teach, but it is known that he was in Hartford and studying law by 1842, and that, in 1844, as he was admitted to the Connecticut bar.

== Career as a Union poet ==
Brownell worked for some years providing legal council and editing historical works in Hartford. During this period he also spent time writing poetry and, in 1847, published a small volume of poems. While this publication and most of his subsequently published poetry was not considered popular or profitable, a poetic retelling of Admiral Farragut's general orders to the fleet in the lead up to the Capture of New Orleans in 1862 caught the eye of the Admiral himself. Farragut personally invited Brownell to join the Union Navy as private secretary to the admiral, a position Brownell was formally appointed to in 1863.

As Admiral Farragut's private secretary, Brownell was present at the Battle of Mobile Bay and continued to accompany Farragut on his tour of Europe after the war had concluded. Many of Brownell's poems from this time were written about Union victories and struggles during naval skirmishes.
