= Edward Doane =

American missionary (1820–1890)

Edward Topping Doane
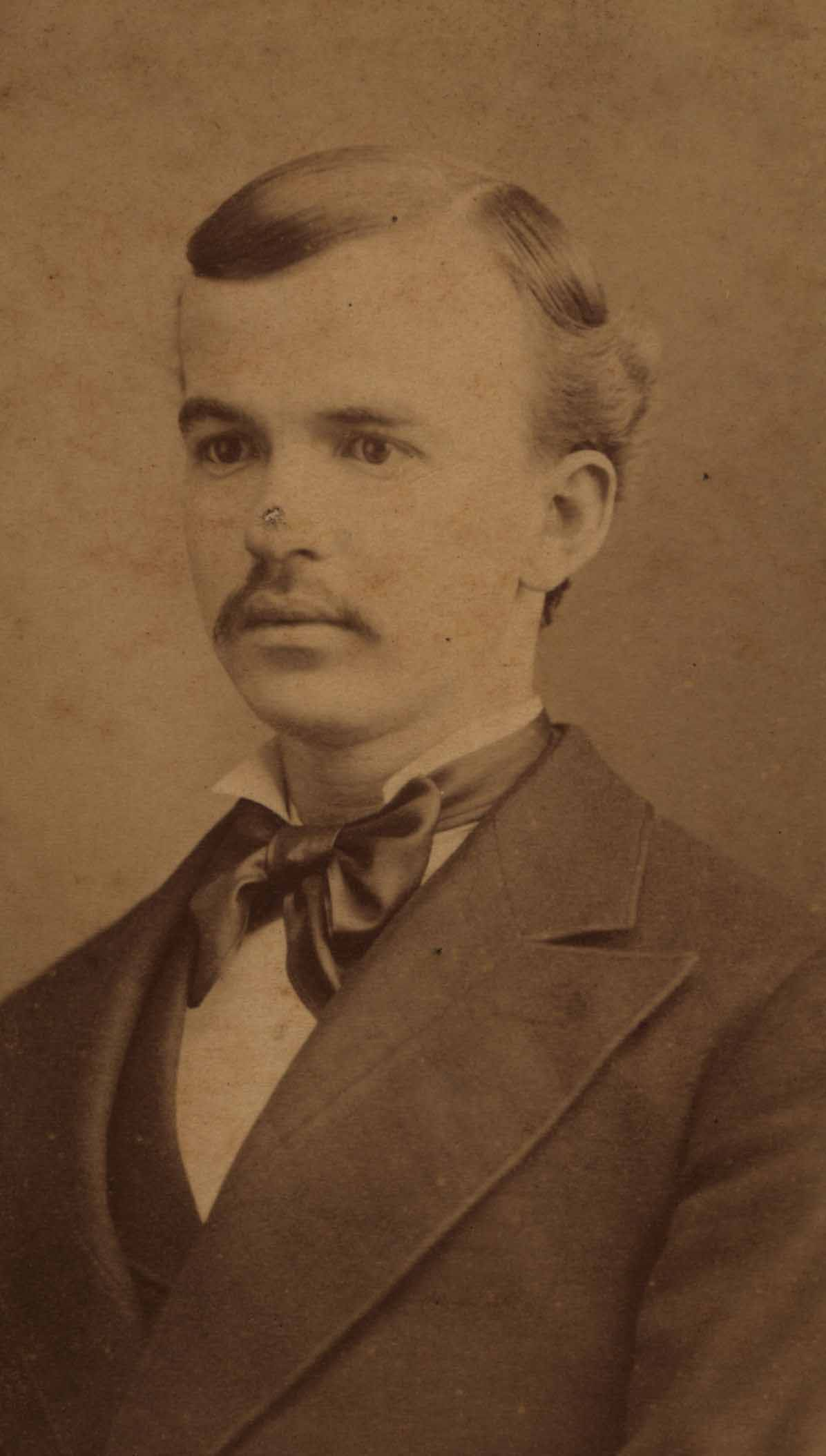
- Born: May 30, 1820; Tompkinsville, Staten Island, New York City
- Died: May 15, 1890 (aged 69); Honolulu, Oahu
- Education: Illinois College, Union Theological Seminary
- Occupation: Missionary in Micronesia

Edward Topping Doane (May 30, 1820 – May 15, 1890) was an American Protestant missionary who served in Micronesia.

Born in New York, he graduated from Illinois College and Union Theological Seminary. He then embarked on missions to Pohnpei and the Marshall Islands. Doane also faced personal challenges during these missions, including the loss of his first wife and a subsequent divorce from his second wife.

Doane became involved in disputes between Catholic and Protestant missionaries. Allegations of encouraging resistance to foreign traders and colonial rule led to his arrest and deportation to the Philippines. However, Doane eventually secured a pardon and returned to Pohnpei. Due to declining health, he relocated to Hawaii, where he died.

== Biography ==
Doane was born at Tompkinsville, Staten Island, New York on May 30, 1820. He graduated from Illinois College in 1848 and from Union Theological Seminary in 1852.

Doane married Sarah W. Wilbur on May 13, 1854, and they soon became missionaries for the American Board of Commissioners for Foreign Missions. They arrived in Pohnpei on February 6, 1855, and then transferred to Ebon Atoll, Marshall Islands two years later. Doane lost his first wife in 1862 after childbirth complications. He traveled back to the United States and remarried Clara H. Strong in Dundee, Illinois, on April 13, 1865.

He and his new wife returned to Pohnpei in 1865. Clara left Pohnpei in 1872 and eventually joined her brother in the Japan Mission. Edward Doane traveled to Japan and found his wife ill. She claimed that she did not want to be married to him so Edward took her to the States and put her in a sanitarium in Illinois. Edward took a position in a small church in Missouri while his wife recovered. Clara persisted in her desire not to reunite with her former husband and they eventually divorced. The Boston Board transferred Edward Doane back to Pohnpei in 1885.

Doane became involved in a dispute between Catholic and Protestant missionaries on Pohnpei. Foreign traders accused Doane of encouraging the Pohnpeians to oppose the German traders and resist Spanish rule. He was arrested on April 13, 1887, for disrespectful behavior. He was deported on June 16 to Manila, Philippines where he soon gained a pardon from Governor General Emilio Terrero and returned to Pohnpei. Doane moved to Honolulu, Hawaii due to his poor health, where he died on May 15, 1890.
