= List of American Revolutionary War battles =

This is a list of military actions in the American Revolutionary War. Actions marked with an asterisk involved no casualties.

Major campaigns, theaters, and expeditions of the war

- Battles of Lexington and Concord (1775)
- Boston campaign (1775–1776)
- Invasion of Quebec (1775–1776)
- New York and New Jersey campaigns (1776–1777)
- Saratoga campaign (1777)
- Philadelphia campaign (1777–1778)
- Yorktown campaign (1781)
- Northern theater of the American Revolutionary War after Saratoga (1778–1781)
- Southern theater of the American Revolutionary War (1775–1783)
- Western theater of the American Revolutionary War (1777–1782)
- Naval operations in the American Revolutionary War

== Battles (in chronological order) ==
Battle	Date	Location	Outcome	Ref
Powder Alarm*	September 1, 1774	Massachusetts	British soldiers remove military supplies	
Storming of Fort William and Mary*	December 14, 1774	New Hampshire	American insurgents seize powder and shot after brief skirmish.	
Battles of Lexington and Concord	April 19, 1775	Massachusetts	American insurgent victory: British forces raiding Concord driven back into Boston with heavy losses.	
Battle of Meriam's Corner	April 19, 1775	Massachusetts	American victory. Patriots attack and inflict casualties on the British as they retreat from Concord.	
Siege of Boston	April 19, 1775 – March 17, 1776	Massachusetts	American victory: British eventually evacuate Boston after Americans fortify Dorchester heights	
Gunpowder Incident*	April 20, 1775	Virginia	Virginia governor Lord Dunmore removes powder to a Royal Navy ship, standoff with American insurgents is resolved peacefully	
New York Armory Raid*	April 23, 1775	New York	American victory: Sons of Liberty capture muskets, bayonets, and cartridge boxes from the armory at City Hall	
Capture of Fort Ticonderoga	May 10, 1775	New York	Major American victory, capture British posts at Ticonderoga and Crown Point	
Battle of Chelsea Creek	May 27–28, 1775	Massachusetts	American victory - capture of British ship Diana	
Broad Street Incident/Raid	June 6, 1775	New York	American victory: Sons of Liberty capture muskets, and cartridge boxes	
Battle of Machias	June 11–12, 1775	Massachusetts (present-day Maine)	American forces capture the HM schooner Margaretta	
Battle of Bunker Hill	June 17, 1775	Massachusetts	British victory: British drive American forces from the Charlestown peninsula near Boston but suffer heavy losses	
Capture of Turtle Bay Depot	July 20, 1775	New York	American victory: Sons of Liberty capture storehouse and magazine	
Battle of Gloucester	August 8, 1775	Massachusetts	American victory	
Raid on the New York Battery	August 23, 1775	New York	American victory: 23 royal cannon from The Battery were taken under fire from HMS Asia offshore	
Siege of Fort St. Jean	September 17 – November 3, 1775	Quebec	American victory - capture of British force and subsequently overrun Montreal and much of Quebec	
Battle of Longue-Pointe	September 25, 1775	Quebec	British victory	
Burning of Falmouth	October 18, 1775	Massachusetts	British burn Falmouth	
Battle of Kemp's Landing	November 14, 1775	Virginia	British victory	
Siege of Savage's Old Fields	November 19–21, 1775	South Carolina	American insurgent victory - defeat of British loyalist force	
Battle of Great Bridge	December 9, 1775	Virginia	American victory: Lord Dunmore's loyalist force is defeated	
Snow Campaign	December 1775	South Carolina	American insurgent victory; a campaign against loyalists in South Carolina	
Battle of Great Cane Break	December 22, 1775	South Carolina	American victory	
Battle of Quebec	December 31, 1775	Quebec	British victory: British repulse American assault on Quebec city	
Burning of Norfolk	January 1, 1776	Virginia	British bombard Norfolk; Americans destroy what they see as a loyalist stronghold	
Battle of Moore's Creek Bridge	February 27, 1776	North Carolina	American victory: loyalist force of Regulators and Highlanders defeated	
Battle of the Rice Boats	March 2–3, 1776	Georgia	British victory	
Raid of Nassau	March 3–4, 1776	Bahamas	American victory. They raided the Bahamas to obtain supplies	
Battle of Saint-Pierre	March 25, 1776	Quebec	American victory	
Battle of Block Island	April 6, 1776	Rhode Island	British victory	
Battle of The Cedars	May 18–27, 1776	Quebec	British victory	
Battle of Round Mountain	June 1, 1776	North Carolina	American victory	
Battle of Trois-Rivières	June 8, 1776	Quebec	British victory: Americans forced to evacuate Quebec	
Battle of Sullivan's Island	June 28, 1776	South Carolina	American victory: British attack on Charleston is repulsed	
Battle of Turtle Gut Inlet	June 29, 1776	New Jersey	American victory	
Battle of McDowell's Station	July 3–12, 1776	North Carolina	American victory	
Battle of Gwynn's Island	July 8–10, 1776	Virginia	American victory	
Battle of Lindley's Fort	July 15, 1776	South Carolina	American victory: Native Americans' attack repulsed	
Battle of Long Island	August 27, 1776	New York	British victory: in the largest battle of the war, the American army of George Washington is outflanked and routed on Long Island, but later manages to evacuate to Manhattan	
Landing at Kip's Bay	September 15, 1776	New York	British victory: British capture New York City and hold it for the duration of the war	
Battle of Harlem Heights	September 16, 1776	New York	American victory: Americans repulse British attack on Manhattan	
Battle of Coweecho River	September 19, 1776	North Carolina	American victory	
Battle of Valcour Island	October 11, 1776	New York	British victory: British defeat American naval force on Lake Champlain, but victory comes too late to press the offensive against the Hudson Valley	
Battle of Mamaroneck	October 22, 1776	New York	British tactical victory	
Battle of White Plains	October 28, 1776	New York	British victory	
Battle of Fort Cumberland	November 10–29, 1776	Nova Scotia	British victory	
Battle of Fort Washington	November 16, 1776	New York	British victory: British capture 3,000 Americans on Manhattan in one of the most devastating defeats of the Continental Army in the war	
Battle of Fort Lee	November 20, 1776	New Jersey	British victory: Americans begin general retreat	
Ambush of Geary	December 14, 1776	New Jersey	American victory	
Battle of Iron Works Hill	December 22–23, 1776	New Jersey	British victory	
Battle of Trenton	December 26, 1776	New Jersey	American victory: Americans capture Hessian detachment at Trenton	
Second Battle of Trenton	January 2, 1777	New Jersey	American victory	
Battle of Princeton	January 3, 1777	New Jersey	American victory: Americans defeat a small British force, the British decide to evacuate New Jersey	
Battle of Millstone	January 20, 1777	New Jersey	American victory	
Forage War	January–March 1777	New Jersey	Americans harass remaining British forces in New Jersey	
Battle of Punk Hill	March 8, 1777	New Jersey	American victory	
Battle of Bound Brook	April 13, 1777	New Jersey	British victory	
Battle of Ridgefield	April 27, 1777	Connecticut	British victory	
Battle of Thomas Creek	May 17, 1777	East Florida	British victory	
Meigs Raid	May 24, 1777	New York	American victory	
Battle of Short Hills	June 26, 1777	New Jersey	British victory	
Siege of Fort Ticonderoga	July 5–6, 1777	New York	British victory	
Battle of Hubbardton	July 7, 1777	Vermont	British victory	
Battle of Fort Ann	July 8, 1777	New York	British victory	
Siege of Fort Stanwix	August 2–23, 1777	New York	American victory: British fail to take Fort Stanwix	
Battle of Oriskany	August 6, 1777	New York	British victory	
Battle of the Flockey	August 13, 1777	New York	American victory; first American Cavalry charge	
Second Battle of Machias	August 13–14, 1777	Massachusetts (present-day Maine)	British victory	
Battle of Bennington	August 16, 1777	New York	American victory	
Battle of Staten Island	August 22, 1777	New York	British victory	
Battle of Setauket	August 22, 1777	New York	British victory	
First siege of Fort Henry	September 1 or 21, 1777	Virginia	American victory	
Battle of Cooch's Bridge	September 3, 1777	Delaware	British victory	
Battle of Brandywine	September 11, 1777	Pennsylvania	British victory	
Battle of the Clouds	September 16, 1777	Pennsylvania	Battle called off due to rain	
Battle of Freeman's Farm	September 19, 1777	New York	British tactical victory: First of the two Battles of Saratoga	
Battle of Paoli	September 21, 1777	Pennsylvania	British victory	
Siege of Fort Mifflin	September 26 – November 15, 1777	Pennsylvania	British victory	
Battle of Germantown	October 4, 1777	Pennsylvania	British victory	
Battle of Forts Clinton and Montgomery	October 6, 1777	New York	British victory	
2nd Battle of Saratoga	October 7, 1777	New York	American victory: Also called the Battle of Bemis Heights. British under Burgoyne driven back and forced to surrender 10 days later; American victory demonstrates to France that the Americans can win; Franco-American treaty follows in 1778.	
Battle of Red Bank	October 22, 1777	New Jersey	American victory	
Battle of Gloucester	November 25, 1777	New Jersey	American victory	
Battle of White Marsh	December 5–8, 1777	Pennsylvania	American victory	
Battle of Matson's Ford	December 11, 1777	Pennsylvania	British victory	
Battle of Barbados	March 7, 1778	Barbados	British victory	
Battle of Quinton's Bridge	March 18, 1778	New Jersey	British victory	
North Channel Naval Duel	April 24, 1778	Great Britain	American victory	
Battle of Crooked Billet	May 1, 1778	Pennsylvania	British victory	
Battle of Barren Hill	May 20, 1778	Pennsylvania	Indecisive	
Mount Hope Bay raids	May 25–30, 1778	Rhode Island	British victory	
Battle of Cobleskill	May 30, 1778	New York	British-Haudenosaunee victory	
Battle of Monmouth	June 28, 1778	New Jersey	Draw: British break off engagement and continue retreat to New York	
Battle of Alligator Bridge	June 30, 1778	East Florida	British victory	
Battle of Wyoming	July 3, 1778	Pennsylvania	British-Haudenosaunee victory	
First Battle of Ushant	July 27, 1778	Bay of Biscay	Indecisive	
Battle of Newport	August 29, 1778	Rhode Island	British victory	
Grey's raid	September 5–17, 1778	Massachusetts	British victory	
Invasion of Dominica	September 7, 1778	Dominica	French victory	
Siege of Boonesborough	September 7, 1778	Kentucky	American victory	
Attack on German Flatts	September 17, 1778	New York	British-Haudenosaunee victory	
Baylor Massacre	September 27, 1778	New Jersey	British victory	
Battle of Edgar's Lane	September 30, 1778	New York	American victory	
Raid on Unadilla and Onaquaga	October 2–16, 1778	Indian Reserve	American victory	
Battle of Chestnut Neck	October 6, 1778	New Jersey	British victory	
Affair at Little Egg Harbor	October 16, 1778	New Jersey	British victory	
Carleton's Raid	October 24 – November 14, 1778	Vermont	British victory	
Cherry Valley Massacre	November 11, 1778	New York	British-Haudenosaunee victory	
Action of 12 December 1779	December 12, 1779	Honduras	British victory	
Capture of St. Lucia	December 18–28, 1778	St. Lucia	British victory	
Capture of Savannah	December 29, 1778	Georgia	British victory	
Battle of Beaufort	February 3, 1779	South Carolina	American victory	
Battle of Kettle Creek	February 14, 1779	Georgia	American victory	
Siege of Fort Vincennes	February 23–25, 1779	Indiana	American victory	
Battle of Brier Creek	March 3, 1779	Georgia	British victory	
Battle of Chillicothe	May 1779	Quebec	American victory	
Chesapeake raid	May 10–24, 1779	Virginia	British victory	
Capture of Saint Vincent	June 16–18, 1779	St. Vincent	French victory	
Battle of Stono Ferry	June 20, 1779	South Carolina	British victory	
Great Siege of Gibraltar	June 24, 1779 – February 7, 1783	Gibraltar	British victory	
Capture of Grenada	July 2, 1779	Grenada	French victory	
Tryon's raid	July 5–14, 1779	Connecticut	British victory	
Battle of Grenada	July 6, 1779	Grenada	French victory	
Battle of Stony Point	July 16, 1779	New York	American victory	
Battle of Minisink	July 22, 1779	New York	British-Haudenosaunee victory	
Penobscot Expedition	July 24 – August 29, 1779	Massachusetts	British victory	
Battle of Paulus Hook	August 19, 1779	New Jersey	American victory	
Battle of Newtown	August 29, 1779	Indian Reserve	American victory	
Capture of Fort Bute	September 7, 1779	West Florida	American-Spanish victory	
Battle of Lake Pontchartrain	September 10, 1779	West Florida	American victory	
Boyd and Parker ambush	September 13, 1779	Indian Reserve	British-Haudenosaunee victory	
Action of 14 September 1779	September 14, 1779	Azores	British victory	
Siege of Savannah	September 16 – October 18, 1779	Georgia	British victory	
Battle of Baton Rouge	September 20–21, 1779	West Florida	American-Spanish victory	
Battle of Flamborough Head	September 23, 1779	Great Britain	American victory	
Action of 6 October 1779	October 6, 1779	France	French victory	
Battle of San Fernando de Omoa	October 16 – November 29, 1779	Guatemala	British victory	
Action of 11 November 1779	November 11, 1779	Portugal	British victory	
Action of 20 November 1779	November 20, 1779	Portugal	British victory	
First Battle of Martinique	December 18, 1779	Martinique	British victory	
Action of 8 January 1780	January 8, 1780	Spain	British victory	
Battle of Cape St. Vincent	January 16, 1780	Portugal	British victory	
Battle of Young's House	February 3, 1780	New York	British victory	
Battle of Van Creek	February 11, 1780	Georgia	Loyalist victory	
San Juan Expedition	March–November 1780	Guatemala	American-Spanish victory	
Battle of Fort Charlotte	March 2–14, 1780	West Florida	American-Spanish victory	
Siege of Charleston	March 29 – May 12, 1780	South Carolina	British victory: British recapture South Carolina following the battle	
Battle of Monck's Corner	April 14, 1780	South Carolina	British victory	
Second Battle of Martinique	April 17, 1780	Martinique	American victory	
Battle of Lenud's Ferry	May 6, 1780	South Carolina	British victory	
Bird's invasion of Kentucky	May 25 – August 4, 1780	Virginia	British victory	
Battle of St. Louis	May 25, 1780	Louisiana (present-day Missouri)	Patriot-Spanish victory	
Battle of Waxhaws	May 29, 1780	South Carolina	British victory	
Battle of Connecticut Farms	June 7, 1780	New Jersey	British victory	
Battle of Mobley's Meeting House	June 10–12, 1780	South Carolina	American victory	
Battle of Ramsour's Mill	June 20, 1780	North Carolina	American victory	
Battle of Springfield	June 23, 1780	New Jersey	American victory	
Huck's Defeat	July 12, 1780	South Carolina	American victory	
Battle of Bull's Ferry	July 20–21, 1780	New Jersey	Loyalist victory	
Battle of Colson's Mill	July 21, 1780	North Carolina	American victory	
Battle of Rocky Mount	August 1, 1780	South Carolina	Loyalist victory	
Battle of Hanging Rock	August 6, 1780	South Carolina	American victory	
Battle of Pekowee	August 8, 1780	Quebec	American victory	
Action of 9 August 1780	August 9, 1780	Atlantic	Franco-Spanish victory	
Action of 10 August 1780	August 10, 1780	France	British victory	
Action of 13 August 1780	August 13, 1780	Ireland	British victory	
Battle of Camden	August 16, 1780	South Carolina	British victory	
Battle of Fishing Creek	August 18, 1780	South Carolina	British victory	
Battle of Musgrove Mill	August 18, 1780	South Carolina	American victory	
Battle of Black Mingo	August 28, 1780	South Carolina	American victory	
Battle of Graham's Fort	September 1, 1780	North Carolina	American victory	
Battle of Wahab's Plantation	September 20, 1780	South Carolina	American victory	
Battle of Charlotte	September 26, 1780	North Carolina	British victory	
Action of 30 September 1780	September 30, 1780	Bermuda	British victory	
Battle of McIntyre Farm	October 3, 1780	North Carolina	American victory	
Battle of Kings Mountain	October 7, 1780	South Carolina	American victory: halts first British invasion of North Carolina	
Battle of Shallow Ford	October 14, 1780	North Carolina	American victory	
Royalton Raid	October 16, 1780	Vermont	British victory	
Battle of Klock's Field	October 19, 1780	New York	American victory	
Battle of Tearcoat Swamp	October 25, 1780	South Carolina	American victory	
La Balme's Defeat	November 5, 1780	Quebec	British-Haudenosaunee victory	
Battle of Fishdam Ford	November 9, 1780	South Carolina	American victory	
Battle of Blackstock's Farm	November 20, 1780	South Carolina	American victory	
Battle of Fort St. George	November 23, 1780	New York	American victory	
Battle of Hammond's Store	December 30, 1780	South Carolina	American Victory	
Battle of Jersey	January 6, 1781	Jersey	British victory	
Battle of Mobile	January 7, 1781	West Florida	American-Spanish victory	
Battle of Cowpens	January 17, 1781	South Carolina	American victory	
Battle of Cowan's Ford	February 1, 1781	North Carolina	British victory	
Capture of Sint Eustatius	February 3, 1781	Sint Eustatius	British victory	
Battle of Summerfield	February 12, 1781	North Carolina	Patriot victory	
Battle of Harts Mill	February 17, 1781	North Carolina	American victory	
Battle of Haw River	February 24, 1781	North Carolina	American victory	
Battle of Wetzell's Mill	March 6, 1781	North Carolina	British victory	
Siege of Pensacola	March 9 – May 8, 1781	West Florida	American-Spanish victory	
Battle of Guilford Court House	March 15, 1781	North Carolina	British victory	
Battle of Cape Henry	March 16, 1781	Virginia	British strategic victory, tactically indecisive	
Battle of Beattie's Mill	March 21, 1781	South Carolina	American victory	
Siege of Fort Watson	April 15–23, 1781	South Carolina	American victory	
Battle of Porto Praya	April 15, 1781	Cape Verde	Draw	
Battle of Blandford	April 25, 1781	Virginia	British victory	
Battle of Hobkirk's Hill	April 25, 1781	South Carolina	British victory	
Battle of Fort Royal	April 29, 1781	Martinique	French victory	
Action of 1 May 1781	May 1, 1781	France	British victory	
Battle of Fort Motte	May 8–12, 1781	South Carolina	American victory	
Battle of Pine's Bridge	May 14, 1781	New York	Loyalist victory	
Battle of Portevent's Mill	May 16, 1781	North Carolina	American victory	
Siege of Augusta	May 22 – June 6, 1781	Georgia	American victory	
Siege of Ninety-Six	May 22 – June 18, 1781	South Carolina	British victory	
Invasion of Tobago	May 24 – June 2, 1781	Tobago	French victory	
Action of 30 May 1781	May 30, 1781	Barbary Coast	British victory	
Battle of Cox's Mill	June 8, 1781	North Carolina	American victory	
Battle of Spencer's Ordinary	June 26, 1781	Virginia	British victory	
Francisco's Fight	July 1781	Virginia	American victory	
Battle of Green Spring	July 6, 1781	Virginia	British victory	
Naval battle of Louisbourg	July 21, 1781	Nova Scotia	Franco-American victory	
Battle of Dogger Bank	August 5, 1781	North Sea	British victory	
Battle of Piqua	August 8, 1781	Ohio	American victory	
Invasion of Minorca	August 19, 1781 – February 5, 1782	Minorca	Franco-Spanish victory	
Lochry's Defeat	August 24, 1781	Quebec	British-Haudenosaunee victory	
Battle of Elizabethtown	August 27, 1781	North Carolina	American victory	
Battle of the Chesapeake	September 5, 1781	Virginia	French victory	
Battle of Groton Heights	September 6, 1781	Connecticut	British victory	
Battle of Eutaw Springs	September 8, 1781	South Carolina	British victory	
Battle of Lindley's Mill	September 13, 1781	North Carolina	American victory	
Long Run Massacre	September 13, 1781	Virginia	British-Haudenosaunee victory	
Battle of Yorktown	September 28 – October 19, 1781	Virginia	Franco-American victory: Cornwallis surrenders his entire force of over 7,000; escape blocked by the French navy. Last major land battle of the war.	
Battle of Fort Slongo	October 3, 1781	New York	American victory	
Battle of Raft Swamp	October 15, 1781	North Carolina	American victory	
Battle of Johnstown	October 25, 1781	New York	American victory	
Second Battle of Ushant	December 12, 1781	Bay of Biscay	British victory	
Battle of Videau's Bridge	January 2, 1782	South Carolina	British victory	
Siege of Brimstone Hill	January 11 – February 13, 1782	St. Christopher	Franco-American victory	
Action of 15 January 1782	January 15, 1782	Jamaica	British victory	
Capture of Demerara and Essequibo	January 22 – February 5, 1782	Demerara and Essequibo	Franco-American victory	
Battle of Saint Kitts	January 25–26, 1782	St. Christopher	British victory	
Capture of Montserrat	February 22, 1782	Montserrat	French victory	
Battle of Wambaw	February 24, 1782	South Carolina	British victory	
Gnadenhütten massacre	March 8, 1782	Ohio		
Battle of Roatán	March 16, 1782	Guatemala	American-Spanish victory	
Action of 16 March 1782	March 16, 1782	Strait of Gibraltar	British victory	
Battle of Little Mountain	March 22, 1782	Virginia	British-Haudenosaunee victory	
Battle of Delaware Bay	April 8, 1782	New Jersey	American victory	
Battle of the Saintes	April 9–12, 1782	Dominica	British victory	
Battle of the Black River	April–August 1782	Guatemala	British victory	
Battle of the Mona Passage	April 19, 1782	Mona passage	British victory	
Action of 20–21 April 1782	April 20–21, 1782	Bay of Biscay	British victory	
Capture of the Bahamas	May 6, 1782	Bahamas	Patriot-Spanish victory	
Crawford expedition	May 25 – June 12, 1782	Quebec	British-Haudenosaunee victory	
Naval battle off Halifax	May 28–29, 1782	Nova Scotia	British victory	
Raid on Chester	June 30, 1782	Nova Scotia	British victory	
Raid on Lunenburg	July 1, 1782	Nova Scotia	American victory	
Hudson Bay Expedition	August 8, 1782	Rupert's Land	Franco-American victory	
Siege of Bryan Station	August 15–17, 1782	Virginia	American victory	
Battle of Blue Licks	August 19, 1782	Virginia	British-Haudenosaunee victory	
Battle of the Combahee River	August 27, 1782	South Carolina	British victory	
Action of 4 September 1782	September 4, 1782	France	British victory	
Action of 5 September 1782	September 5, 1782	Long Island	Inconclusive	
Siege of Fort Henry	September 11–13, 1782	Virginia	American victory	
Grand Assault on Gibraltar	September 13, 1782	Gibraltar	British victory	
Action of 15 September 1782	September 15, 1782	Delaware Bay	British victory	
Action of 18 October 1782	October 18, 1782	Hispaniola	British victory	
Battle of James Island	November 14, 1782	South Carolina	British victory	
Action of 6 December 1782	December 6, 1782	Martinique	British victory	
Battle of the Delaware Capes	December 20–21, 1782	Cape May	British victory	
Battle of Cedar Bridge	December 27, 1782	New Jersey	American victory: Captains Richard Shreve and Edward Thomas engaged John Bacon and his Loyalist bandits (known now as "Refugees") at Cedar Bridge. A brief exchange of gunfire took place, and Bacon and his men were able to escape. This was the last land battle in the U.S.	
Action of 2 January 1783	January 2, 1783	Hispaniola	Inconclusive	
Action of 22 January 1783	January 22, 1783	Virginia	British victory	
Action of 15 February 1783	February 15, 1783	Guadeloupe	British victory	
Action of 17 February 1783	February 17, 1783	Cuba	British victory	
Recapture of the Bahamas	April 14–18, 1783	Bahamas	British victory	
Battle of Arkansas Post	April 17, 1783	Louisiana (present-day Arkansas)	Spanish Victory	

== See also ==
- List of British Forces in the American Revolutionary War
- List of Continental Forces in the American Revolutionary War
- List of George Washington articles
