= 1783 in the United States =

- Decades: 1770s; 1780s; 1790s; 1800s
- See also: History of the United States (1776–1789); Timeline of pre-United States history; List of years in the United States

Abel Buell's map of the United States in 1783

Events from the year 1783 in the United States. The American Revolution officially ended with the Treaty of Paris.

== Incumbents ==
- President of the Continental Congress: Elias Boudinot (until November 4), Thomas Mifflin (starting November 4)

== Events ==
=== January–March ===
- January 23 – The Confederation Congress ratifies two October 8, 1782, treaties signed by the United States with the United Netherlands.
- February 3 – American Revolutionary War: Britain awards the United States independence. Spain refuses to grant diplomatic recognition to the United States.
- February 4 – American Revolutionary War: Great Britain formally declares that it will cease hostilities with the United States of America.
- February 26 – The United States Continental Army's Corps of Engineers is disbanded.
- March 5 – Last celebration of Massacre Day in Boston, Massachusetts.
- March 15 – Newburgh Conspiracy: A potential uprising in the Continental Army stationed at Newburgh, New York, is defused when George Washington asks the officers to support the supremacy of the United States Congress.

=== April–June ===
- April – Peace and Commercial Treaty signed with Sweden in Paris, the first act of state concluded between the United States and a foreign power.
- April 15 – Preliminary articles of peace ending the American Revolutionary War are ratified by the Congress of the Confederation.
- April 17 – American Revolutionary War: Colbert's Raid: A Spanish garrison under Captain Jacobo du Breuil defeat British irregulars at Arkansas Post.
- May 13 – The Society of the Cincinnati, a fraternal organization for American veterans of the American Revolution, is formed in Newburgh, New York.
- May 18 – The first United Empire Loyalists, fleeing the new United States, reach Parrtown in Saint John, New Brunswick, Canada.
- May 26 – A Great Jubilee Day is held in Trumbull, Connecticut, to celebrate the end of the American Revolution.
- June 20 – Continental Army soldiers mob Independence Hall, Philadelphia, demanding back pay from the Congress of the Confederation in the Pennsylvania Mutiny of 1783. Congress flees to New Jersey.

=== July–September ===
- July 16 – Grants of land in Canada to Loyalists are announced.
- September 3 – American Revolutionary War: Treaty of Paris – A treaty between the United States and the Kingdom of Great Britain is signed in Paris, ending the war and formally granting the United States independence from Great Britain.
- September 9 – Dickinson College is chartered in Carlisle, Pennsylvania.
- September 22 – American frontier: Confederation Congress Proclamation of 1783 prohibits the settlement, purchase or receipt of Indian lands beyond existing states without its specific authority and direction.

=== October–December ===
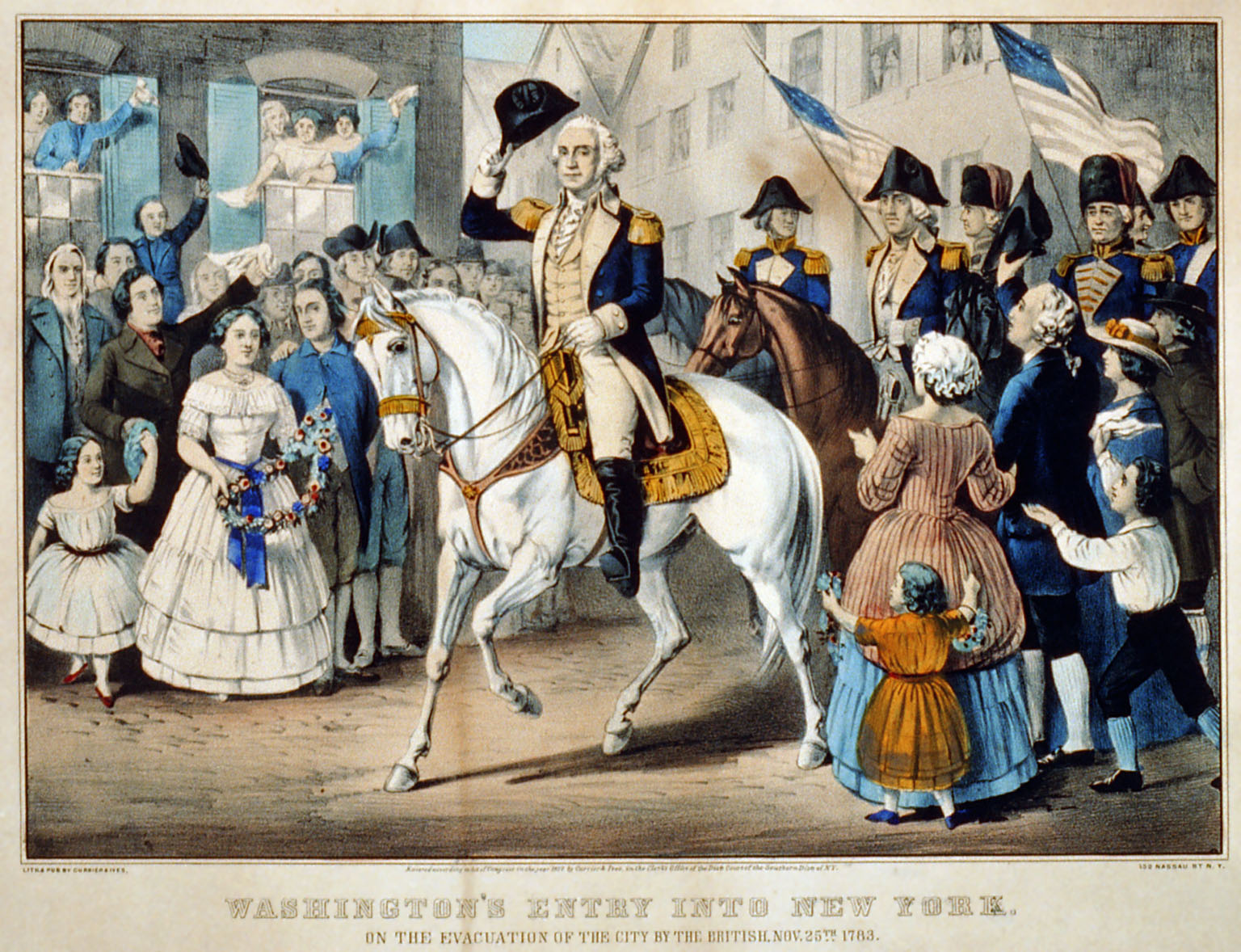
November 25: Washington's Entry into New York by Currier & Ives

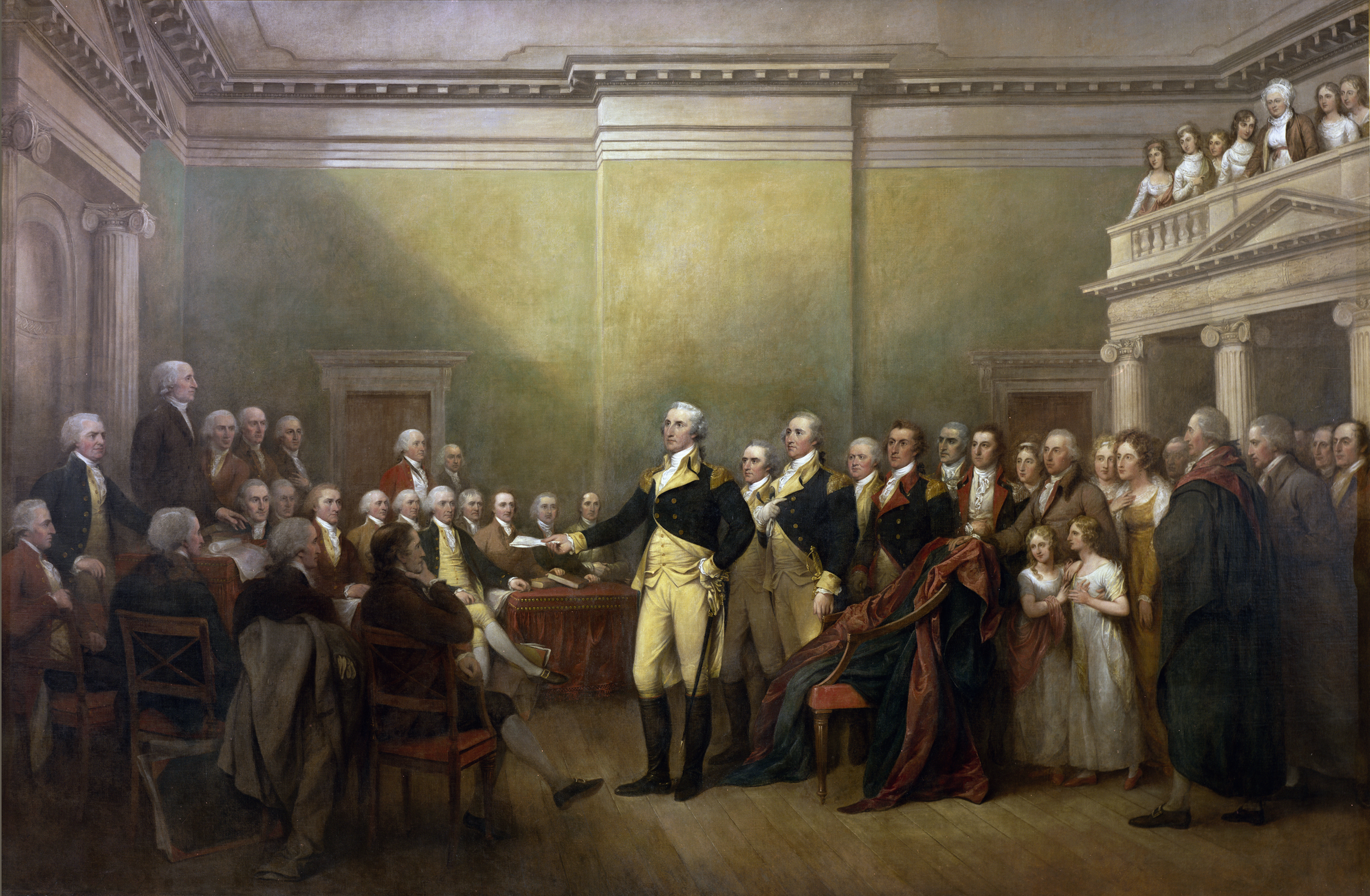
December 23: General George Washington Resigning His Commission by John Trumbull

- November 2 – In Rocky Hill, New Jersey, United States General George Washington gives his Farewell Address to the Army.
- November 3 – The American Continental Army is disbanded as the first act of business by the Confederation Congress, after Thomas Mifflin is elected the new president to succeed Elias Boudinot.
- November 25 – Evacuation Day (New York): The last British troops leave New York City and George Washington triumphantly returns, three months after the signing of the Treaty of Paris.
- November 29 – The 5.3 M_{fa} New Jersey earthquake affects the Province of New Jersey with a maximum Mercalli intensity of VII ("Very strong").
- December 4 – At Fraunces Tavern in New York City, U.S. General George Washington formally bids his officers farewell.
- December 23 – George Washington's resignation as commander-in-chief of the Continental Army to the Congress of the Confederation in the Maryland State House in Annapolis, Maryland. He retires to his home at Mount Vernon. Washington's resignation affirms the new nation's commitment to the principle of civilian control of the military and prompts King George III of the United Kingdom to call him "the greatest character of the age."

=== Undated ===
- Loyalists from New York settle Great Abaco in the Bahamas.
- Evan Williams (bourbon) distillery is founded in Bardstown, Kentucky.

=== Ongoing ===
- American Revolutionary War (1775–1783)
- Articles of Confederation in effect (1781–1788)

== Births ==
- January 14 – Wilson Lumpkin, U.S. Senator from Georgia from 1837 to 1841 and Governor of Georgia from 1831 to 1835 (died 1870)
- February 16 – Stephen Cassin, U.S. Navy officer (died 1857)
- February 18 – Oliver Dean, physician, businessman, and philanthropist (died 1871)
- March 8 – Hannah Van Buren, née Hoes, wife of Martin Van Buren, 8th president of the United States (died 1819)
- April 3 – Washington Irving, author (died 1859)
- May 12 – Perry Smith, U.S. Senator from Connecticut from 1837 to 1843 (died 1852)
- May 25 – Philip P. Barbour, Associate Justice of the U.S. Supreme Court from 1836 to 1841 (died 1841)
- June 21 – Theodosia Burr Alston, daughter of Aaron Burr, First Lady of South Carolina during War of 1812 (died 1813)
- July 31 – John Wales, U.S. Senator from Delaware from 1849 to 1851 (died 1863)
- August 12 – John Williams Walker, U.S. Senator from Alabama from 1819 to 1822 (died 1823)
- September 14 – Henry Johnson, U.S. Senator from Louisiana from 1818 to 1824 and 1844 to 1849 (died 1864)
- December 14 – David Barton, U.S. Senator from Missouri from 1821 to 1831 (died 1837)
- December 3 – William Hale, soldier, politician and the first mayor of Peoria, Illinois (d. 1859)
- December 30 – Stephen H. Long, mechanical engineer with Baltimore and Ohio Railroad (died 1864)

=== Undated ===
- Patrick Coad, teacher and lecturer (died 1872)

== Deaths ==
- January 15 – William Alexander, Lord Stirling, Major-General in the Continental Army (born 1726)
- March 23 – Charles Carroll, lawyer, delegate to the Continental Congress (born 1723)
- May 23 – James Otis Jr., political activist and pamphleteer (born 1725)
- November 15 – John Hanson, first president of the Continental Congress (born 1721)
- November 23 – Ann Eliza Bleecker, poet, novelist and correspondent (born 1752)

== See also ==
- Timeline of the American Revolution (1760–1789)
