= 1782 in the United States =

- Decades: 1770s; 1780s; 1790s; 1800s
- See also: History of the United States (1776–1789); Timeline of the American Revolution; List of years in the United States

Events from the year 1782 in the United States

== General ==
- President of the Confederation Congress: John Hanson (until November 4), Elias Boudinot (starting November 4)

== Events ==
=== January–March ===
- January 3 – American Revolutionary War: Battle of Videau's Bridge
- January 7 – The first American commercial bank (Bank of North America) opens in Philadelphia.
- January 15 – Superintendent of Finance Robert Morris goes before the United States Congress to recommend establishment of a national mint and decimal coinage.
- February 24 – American Revolutionary War: Battle of Wambaw
- March 8 – American Revolutionary War: In Ohio, the Gnadenhutten massacre of Native Americans takes place in which 29 men, 27 women and 34 children are killed by white militiamen in retaliation for raids carried out by another Native American group.
- March 22 – American Revolutionary War: Battle of Little Mountain.

=== April–June ===
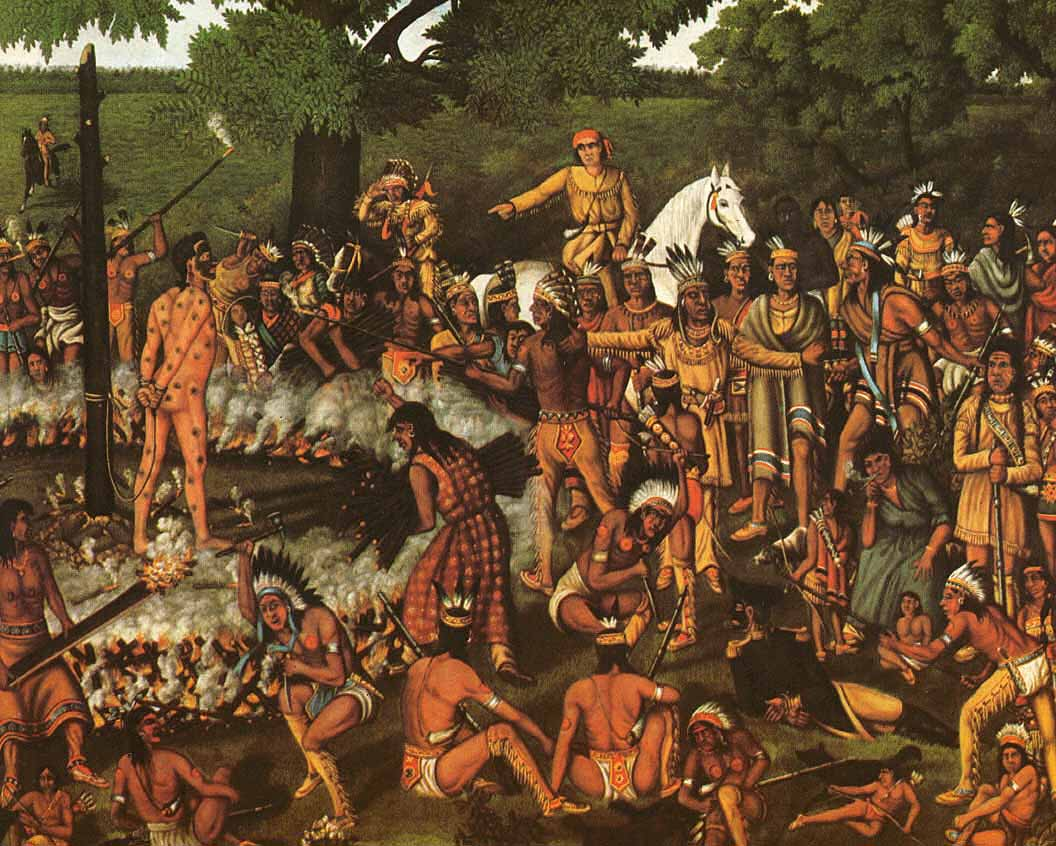
June 11: Crawford expedition; Native Americans burn Colonel William Crawford at the stake.

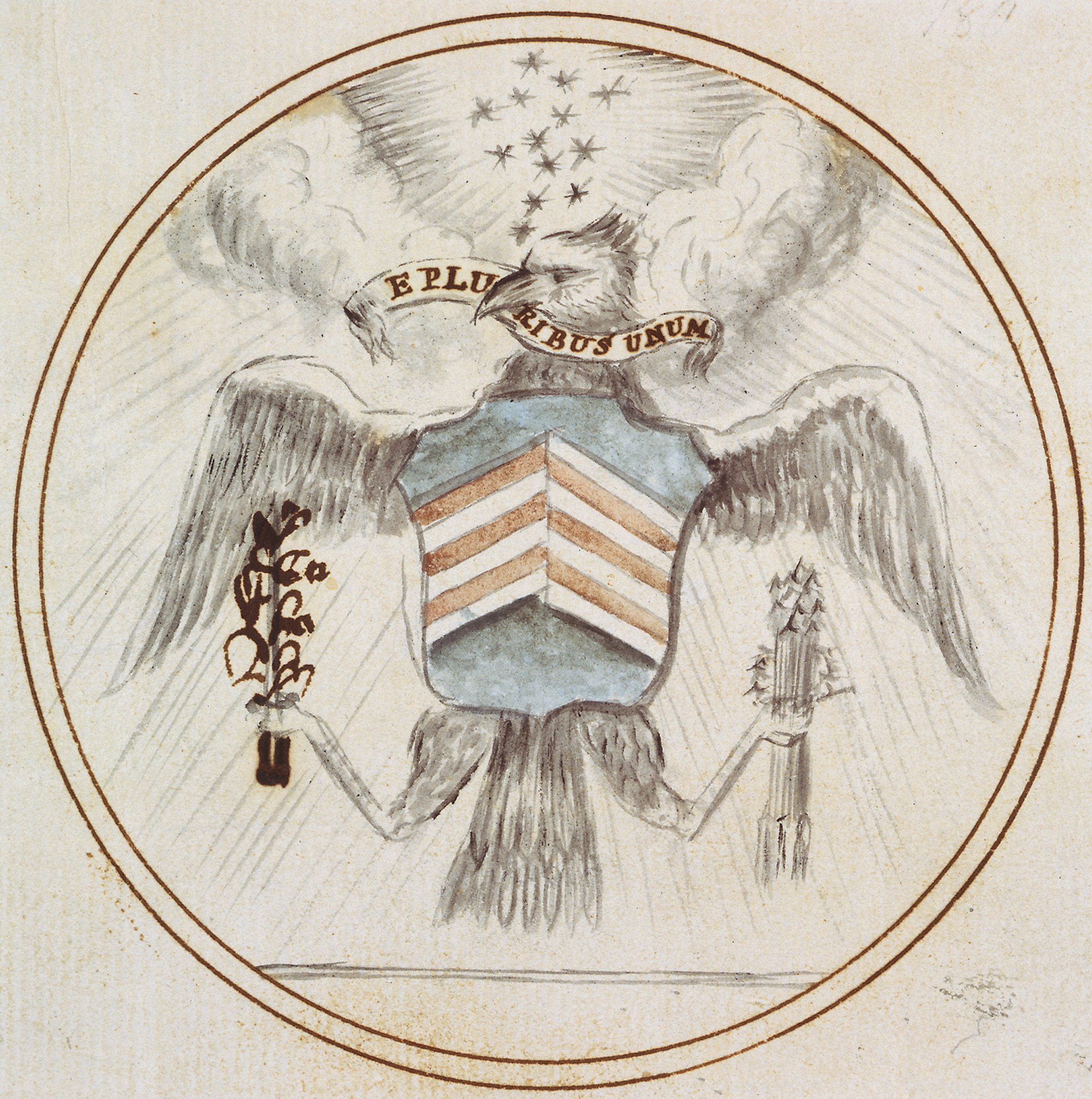
June 20: Great Seal of the United States

- April 8 – American Revolutionary War: Battle of Delaware Bay
- April 19 – The Netherlands recognizes the United States being the second to do so and establishes diplomatic relations.
- May 21 – American Revolutionary War: Battle of Blomindon
- May 25–June 12 – American Revolutionary War: Crawford expedition
- June 20 – Congress accepts Charles Thomson's design for the Great Seal of the United States. The bald eagle becomes the national bird of the United States.

=== July–September ===
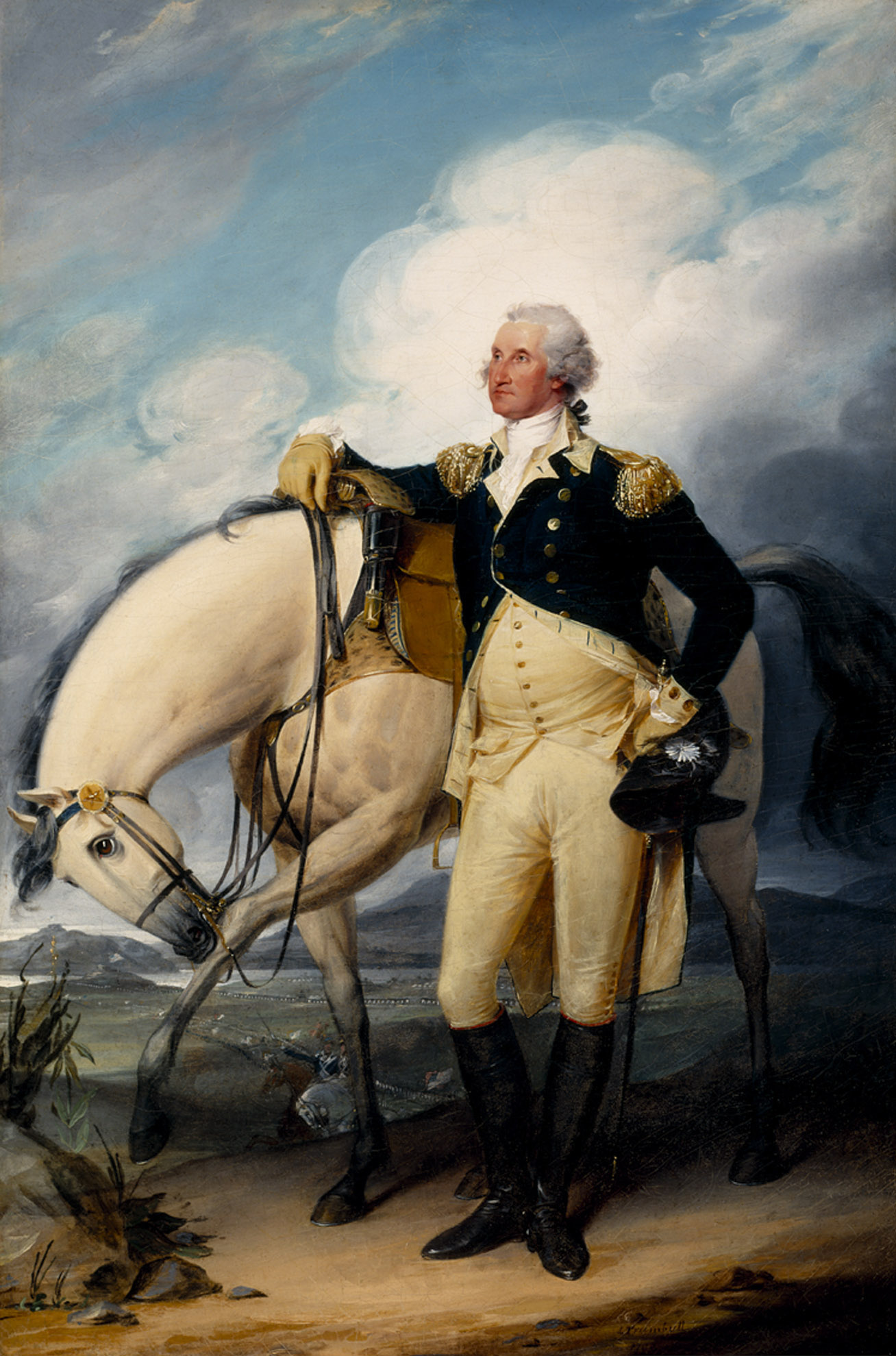
September 14: Washington at Verplanck's Point, by John Trumbull, 1790

- July 1 – American privateers attack Lunenburg, Nova Scotia.
- August 7 – George Washington orders the creation of the Badge of Military Merit (or the Order of the Purple Heart) to honor soldiers' merit in battle (reinstated later by Franklin D. Roosevelt and renamed to the more poetic "Purple Heart" to honor soldiers wounded in action).
- August 15–17 – American Revolutionary War: Siege of Bryan Station
- August 19 – American Revolutionary War: Battle of Blue Licks
- August 27 – American Revolutionary War: Battle of the Combahee River
- September 11–13 – American Revolutionary War: Siege of Fort Henry (1782)
- September 14 – American Revolutionary War: Review of the French troops under General Rochambeau by General George Washington at Verplanck's Point, New York.

=== October–December ===
- November 30 – American Revolutionary War: In Paris, representatives from the United States and the Kingdom of Great Britain sign preliminary peace articles (later formalized in the Treaty of Paris).
- December 12 – American Revolutionary War: Action of 12 December 1782: A naval engagement off Ferrol, Spain, in which the British ship HMS Mediator (1782) successfully attacks a convoy of French and American ships attempting to supply the United States.

=== Undated ===
- Summer – Dutch banker Nicolaas van Staphorst leads discussions with John Adams over a loan to the United States of five million guilders, at that time a considerable sum.
- Jesuit priest Robert Molyneux establishes the first parochial school in the United States in Philadelphia.
- The North Carolina General Assembly incorporates Washington, North Carolina.

=== Ongoing ===
- American Revolutionary War (1775–1783)
- Articles of Confederation in effect (1781–1788)

== Births ==
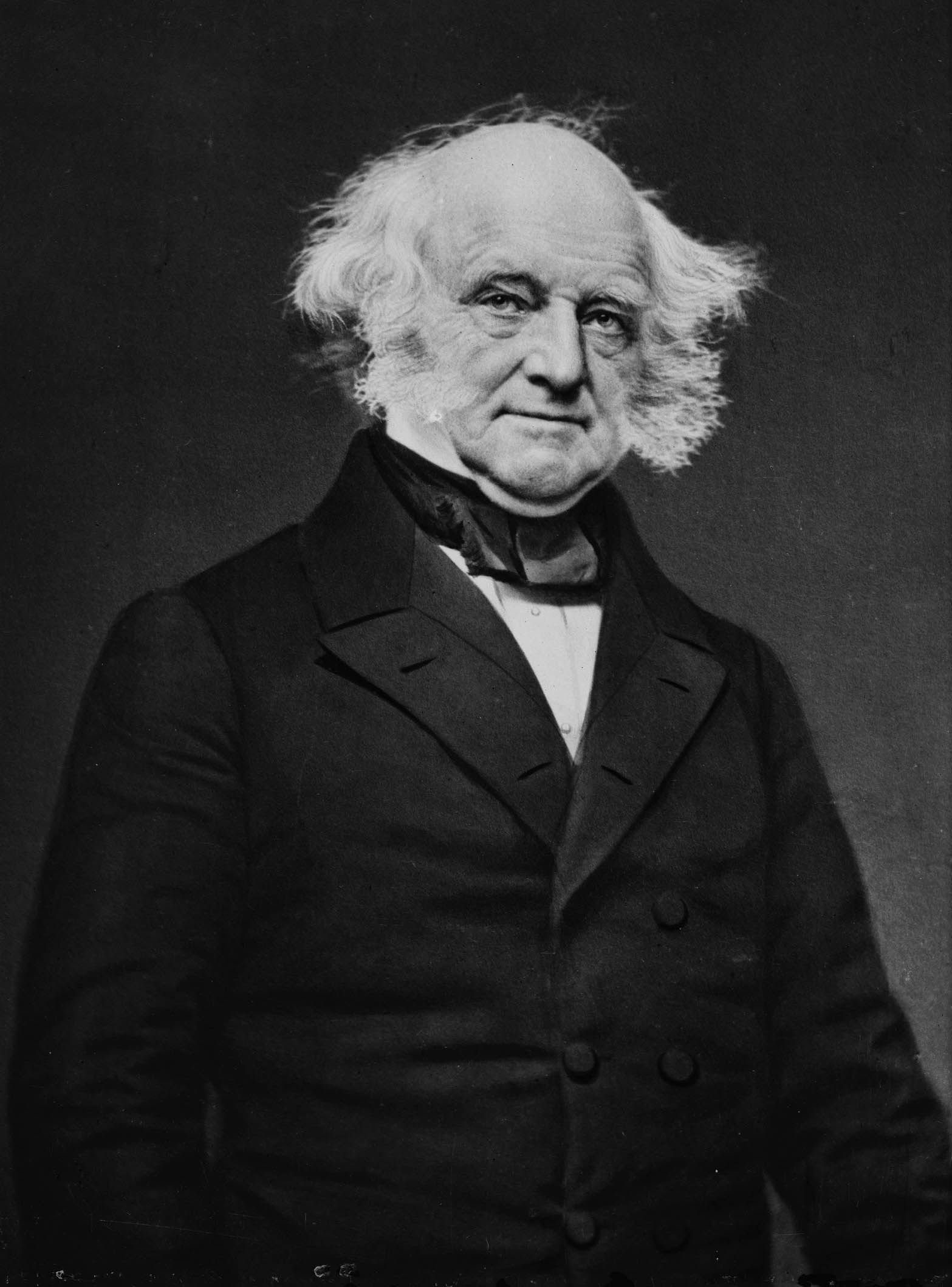
Martin Van Buren

- January 18 – Daniel Webster, U.S. Senator from Massachusetts (died 1852)
- January 22 – Philip Hamilton, first son of Alexander Hamilton and Elizabeth Schuyler Hamilton (died 1801)
- February 15 – William Miller, preacher (died 1849)
- March 14 – Thomas Hart Benton, U.S. Senator from Missouri from 1821 to 1851 (died 1858)
- March 18 – John C. Calhoun, seventh vice president of the United States from 1825 to 1832 (died 1850)
- May 14 – Gordon Cartwright Jennings, oldest defender at the Battle of the Alamo (died in battle 1836)
- October 9 – Lewis Cass, military officer, U.S. Senator from Michigan from 1845 to 1848 and from 1849 to 1857 (died 1866)
- November 4 – John Branch, U.S. Senator from North Carolina from 1817 to 1820 (died 1863)
- November 12 – William Hendricks, U.S. Senator from Indiana from 1825 to 1837 (died 1850)
- December 5 – Martin Van Buren, eighth president of the United States from 1837 to 1841, eighth vice president of the United States from 1833 to 1837 (died 1862)
- Date unknown – George A. Waggaman, U.S. Senator from Louisiana from 1831 to 1835 (died 1843)

== Deaths ==
- August 27 – John Laurens, American soldier and statesman during the Revolutionary War, best known for his efforts to emancipate slaves (killed fighting the British in South Carolina). (born 1754)
- September 6 – Martha Jefferson, wife of Thomas Jefferson (born 1748)
- October 2 – Charles Lee, general of the Continental Army during the American Revolutionary War (born 1732)

== See also ==
- Timeline of the American Revolution (1760–1789)
