= 1784 in the United States =

- Decades: 1770s; 1780s; 1790s; 1800s
- See also: History of the United States (1776–1789); Timeline of pre-United States history; List of years in the United States

Events from the year 1784 in the United States.

== Incumbents ==
- President of the Continental Congress: Thomas Mifflin (until June 3), Richard Henry Lee (starting November 30)

== Events ==
- January 7 – D. Landreth Seed Company established in Philadelphia; it will continue to exist into the 21st century.
- January 14 – The Confederation Congress ratifies the Treaty of Paris with Great Britain to end the American Revolutionary War.
- February – The Massachusetts Bank, a predecessor of BankBoston, is established as the first federally chartered joint-stock bank in the U.S. The bank's charter is signed by John Hancock and its early account holders include Paul Revere, Samuel Adams, John Hancock and Henry Knox.
- March 2 – Governor George Clinton of New York writes to Congress asking them to declare war against Vermont, which at this time is an unrecognized de facto independent state claimed by New York. Congress declined to do this.
- April 23 – The Land Ordinance of 1784 resolves that the territory ceded to the United States by the Treaty of Paris, or by individual states, and that already purchased or to be purchased from the Indian inhabitants, will be offered for sale by Congress and divided into future states.
- June 9 – The Bank of New York, a predecessor of BNY Mellon, opens.
- June 15 – Meshech Weare is sworn in as the first governor of New Hampshire.
- September 22 – Russia establishes their first colony in Kodiak, Alaska.
- October 22 – Treaty of Fort Stanwix is signed between the United States and Native Americans of the Iroquois League.
- November 26 – The Roman Catholic Apostolic Prefecture of the United States is established.
- December 25 – The Methodist Episcopal Church is officially formed at the so-called "Christmas Conference" led by Thomas Coke and Francis Asbury.

=== Undated ===
- King Carlos III of the Spanish Empire authorizes land grants in Alta California.
- The North Carolina General Assembly incorporates the town of Morgansborough, named for Daniel Morgan. The town is designated as the county seat for Burke County, North Carolina and is subsequently renamed "Morgantown" and later shortened to become Morganton.
- The North Carolina General Assembly changes the name of Kingston, North Carolina, originally named for King George III of Great Britain, to Kinston.
- Benjamin Franklin tries in vain to persuade the French to alter their clocks in winter to take advantage of the daylight.
- Benjamin Franklin invents bifocal spectacles.
- Britain receives its first bales of imported American cotton.
- The Mutual Assurance Company for Insuring Houses from Loss by Fire is established in Philadelphia.

=== Ongoing ===
- Articles of Confederation in effect (1781–1788)

== Births ==
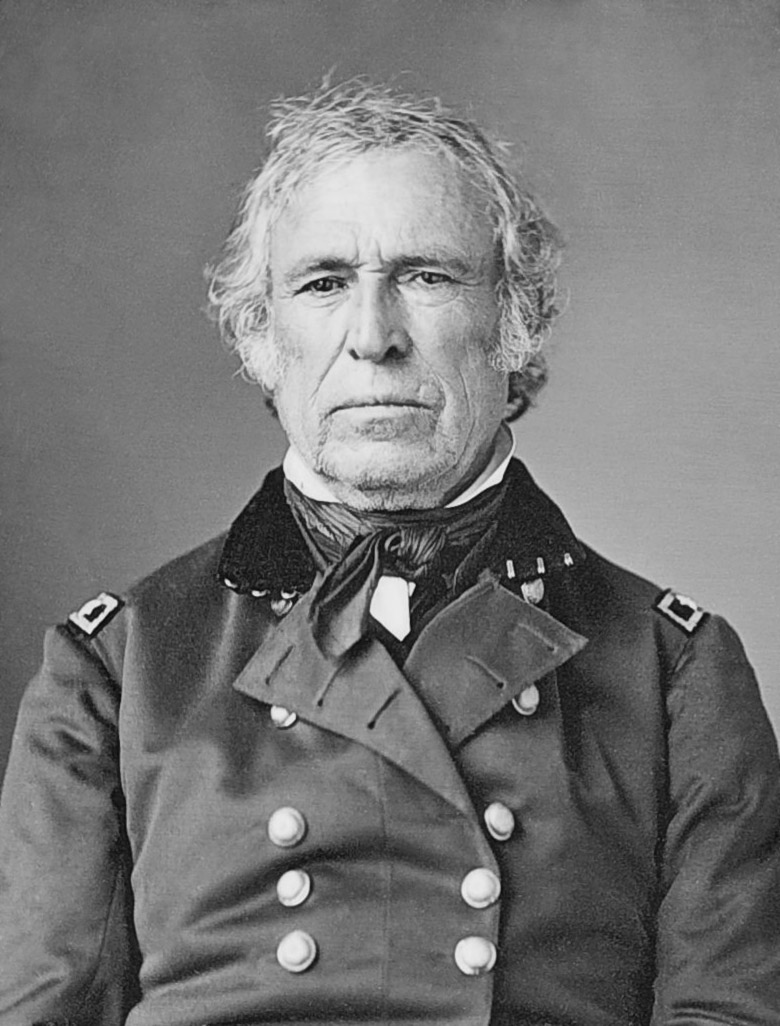
Zachary Taylor

- February 5 – William T. Barry, U.S. Senator from Kentucky from 1814 to 1816 and Postmaster General from 1829 to 1835 (died 1835)
- March 23 – Tom Molineaux, bare-knuckle heavyweight boxer (died 1818 in Ireland)
- March 27 – Jonathan Jennings, 1st governor of Indiana (died 1834)
- November 24 – Zachary Taylor, 12th president of the U.S. from 1849 to 1850 (died 1850)
- Date unknown – Thomas W. Cobb, U.S. Senator from Georgia from 1824 to 1828 (died 1830)

== Deaths ==
- June 13 – Henry Middleton, 2nd president of the Continental Congress, signatory of Continental Association (born 1717)
- June 26 – Caesar Rodney, lawyer and president of Delaware (born 1728)
- September 8 – Ann Lee, religious leader (born 1736)
- December 5 – Phillis Wheatley, first published African-American female poet (born 1753)
- December 26 – Seth Warner, revolutionary leader (born 1743)

== See also ==
- Timeline of the American Revolution (1760–1789)
