= Patrick Coad =

Patrick Coad (1783–1872) was a teacher and lecturer on the natural sciences and medicine in Philadelphia, Pennsylvania. He was born in Ireland but emigrated to the United States and married the daughter of Mathias James O'Conway, a prominent linguist and lexicographer within the Philadelphia Catholic community. Patrick and Anna Coad went on to be prominent members themselves in the Catholic, medical, and scientific communities of Philadelphia, particularly in the neighborhood of Southwark, Philadelphia, Pennsylvania. They had seven children: Cecila, Anna, Elizabeth, Eleanor, John, Theophilus Mathias, and Joseph R. Coad (1829–1868), who went on to become a prominent Philadelphia physician and who served on the city’s Board of Health.

Patrick Coad invented and patented the first galvanic battery in March 1842. The graduated galvanic battery with poles patent was an early form of electrotherapeutics and was touted by Coad and others as a way to help cure various diseases through the use of electricity and magnetism as medical treatment. Many prominent people of the day championed Coad’s invention including Thomas Dent Mutter, Henry Nes, Governor John Fairfield, Robley Dunglison, and Joseph Pancoast.
