= Nathan Meriam House =

Colonial building in Massachusetts

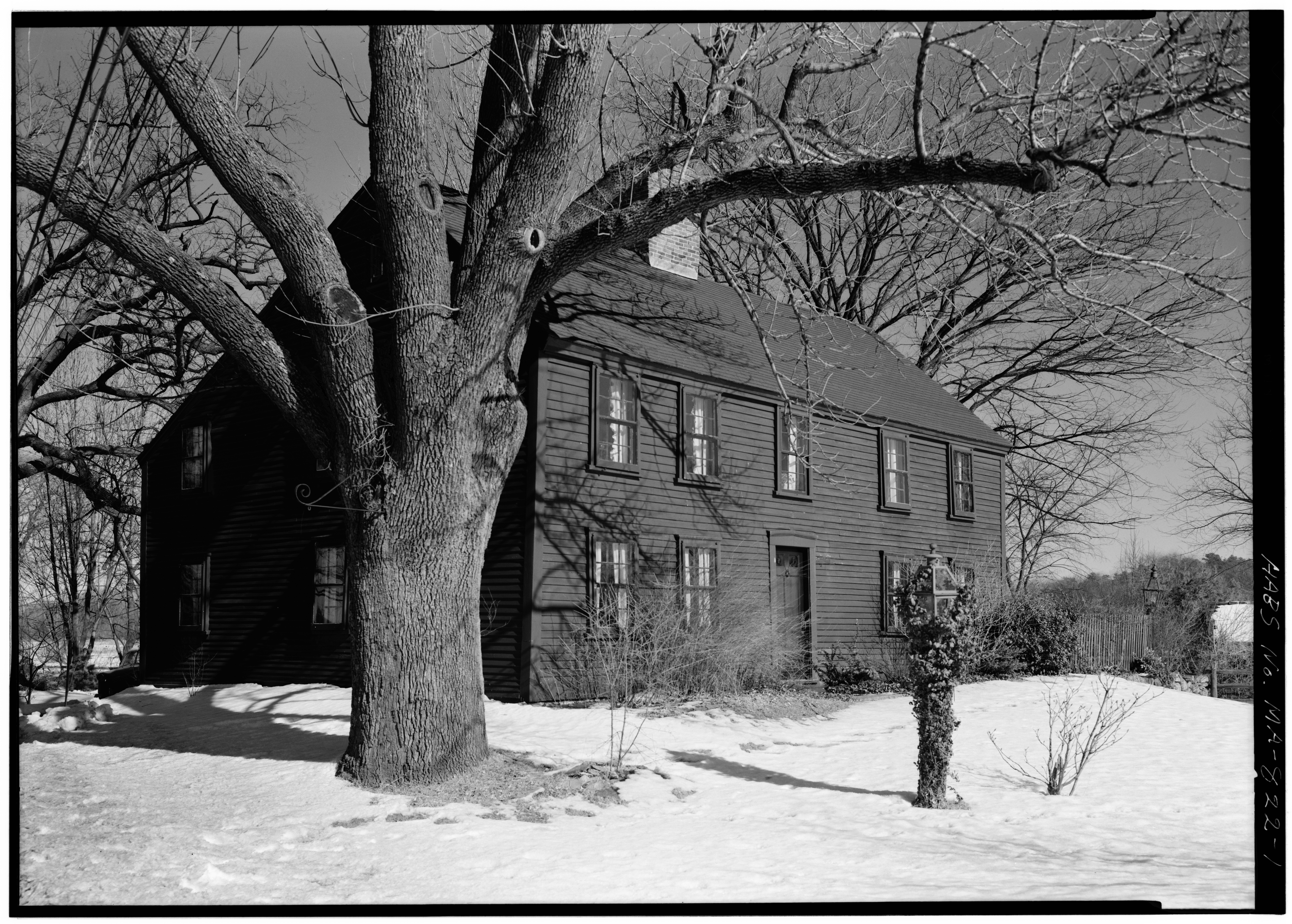
- The property in the mid-20th century
- Interactive map of the Nathan Meriam House area

General information
- Location: Concord, Massachusetts, Old Bedford Road
- Coordinates: 42.46002°N 71.32383°W
- Completed: c. 1705 (321 years ago)

Technical details
- Floor count: 2

The Nathan Meriam House is a historic American Revolutionary War site associated with the revolution's first battle, the 1775 battles of Lexington and Concord. Built around 1705, it stands on Old Bedford Road, near its intersection with Lexington Road, in Concord, Massachusetts; the intersection is now known as Meriam's Corner. It is one of eleven houses within the Minute Man National Historic Park that still exists today. This area was part of the former Battle Road.

== History ==
Joseph and Sarah Meriam arrived in Concord from Kent, England, in 1638, with six children. Another child, John, was born after their arrival. John and his wife, Mary, built the first home at Meriam's Corner in 1663. Their son, John, built a second home in 1691 for himself and his wife, Sarah. In 1705, John's son, Joseph, built a third home, where he lived with his wife, Dorothy Brooks. It is this house, later owned by Nathan and Abigail Meriam, that is now known as the Nathan Meriam House.

Nathan and Abigail lived in the house with their seven children, whose ages ranged from eleven to twenty-nine. The house remained in the Meriam family until 1871, when it was sold to Thomas Burke. In 1925, while still owned by the Burke family, a fire broke out at the property, leading to a renovation. These renovations, and others done prior to the fire, are visible in today's structure; as such, the building now looks different to the original construction.

=== Battles of Lexington and Concord ===
The battles of Lexington and Concord took form before dawn on April 19, 1775. Soldiers passed by the house on their way to Concord, and again on their way back to Boston.
