= Thomas Waters (American Revolution) =

- Born: Thomas Willoughby Waters c. 1735; Exeter, Devon, England, United Kingdom of Great Britain
- Died: June 1, 1813 (aged 77–78) possibly London, Essex, England, United Kingdom of Great Britain and Ireland
- Spouse: Sally (Sarah) Hughes
- Children: 2 (and one orphan girl)
- Military career
- Allegiance: United Kingdom of Great Britain
- Service/Branch: British Army; Loyalist Army Militia
- Service years: 1761-1781
- Rank: Colonel
- Units: Second Georgia Colonial Ranger Troop (1761-1767) Georgia Colonial Ranger Troop (Ceded Lands) (1773-1776) Fifth Colonial Militia Regiment (Ceded Lands) (1779-1781)
- Known for: Role in the American Revolutionary War
- Battles: Battle of Hammond's Store; Battle of Kettle Creek

Thomas Willoughby Waters (c. 1735 – June 1, 1813) was a prominent figure in the American Revolutionary War in Georgia and South Carolina. Waters became a devout Loyalist in 1779 after Georgia was invaded by British troops, and served as a colonel in the Fifth Colonial Militia Regiment, which was a Loyalist militia group from the Ceded Lands (Wilkes County, Georgia). Thomas Waters was known for utilizing his militia in the storming of Georgia and the Backcountry South Carolina, which led to the homes and settlements of Patriot families being looted and destroyed. Waters was regarded as one of the most infamous Tories in the war.

== Early life ==
Thomas Waters was born to English and Welsh parents Richard and Mary Morgan Waters around 1735 in Exeter, England. When Waters became a young man, he possibly arrived in the Province of Georgia to become an apprentice businessman. From there, he started working with merchants in trades between the indigenous people in Augusta and South Carolina, which was where he resided. Waters had also taken ownership of multiple parcels of land in Georgia and South Carolina. In 1765, Waters was named commissioner in building a new fort and barracks in the city of Augusta, and was elected into the Georgia House of Assembly from the St. Paul Parish (present-day Columbia and Richmond counties), which at the time was a frontier. The next year, Waters was named a justice of the peace. In 1767, tensions in the Augusta area heightened after settlers burned down an indigenous settlement along the Little River, and Waters, along with his neighbors, warned the governor of the potential dangers from such events.

== Service in the Colonial Rangers ==
On April 1, 1761, Thomas (as well as his brother Richard) Waters, joined the Second Georgia Colonial Ranger Troop, and they both served as cadets. By July 1 of that year, Thomas Waters was then promoted to a Quartermaster. The colonial rangers were troops of the British armed forces that preserved civil order and are given the duty to police and patrol. Thomas Waters remained in the colonial rangers until 1767, when General Thomas Gage discontinued both ranger troops in response to tensions in Georgia rising due to the Stamp Act Crisis of 1766.

In 1773, Thomas Waters and his new business partner, Edward Barnard, moved to the Ceded Lands of Georgia to survey the lands after the governor, James Wright, acquired the land that year. Earlier that year, James Wright formed a new colonial ranger troop to police the Ceded Lands in order to counter the threat of vagrants, whom Wright viewed as bandits. Waters joined the new ranger troop as a first lieutenant, and served under Capt. Edward Barnard until June 6, 1775, when Barnard died and Capt. James Edward Powell was named as Waters' new superior. With Thomas Waters as an officer, he was given the commission to enforce the law and to keep the peace. Waters and his men operated from Fort James, and served alongside the St. Paul Parish militia in 1774 to counter any violent Muscogee war parties, in response to their significant loss of land. However, both the militia and the rangers suffered a brutal defeat to the Muscogee.

== Prominence in the Ceded Lands ==
In 1774, Thomas Waters established multiple plantations on 4,500 acres of land across the Ceded Lands. The plantations were located on the Broad and Savannah Rivers, near Wrightsborough, and on the edges of the Ceded Lands. Waters placed 44 of his slaves and 12 of his skilled laborers onto those plantations, where they raised livestock and crops. He also owned a blacksmith shop, a fort, a two-story house, and three mills. Waters had also loaned money to more than 200 families in the Ceded Lands in order to afford their initial payments. One of those settlers was Elijah Clarke who, at the time, was a landless frontiersman from Craven County, South Carolina that acquired a 150 acre parcel of land.

== American Revolution ==
When the Ceded Lands opened, the American Revolution had commenced. In 1774, Thomas Waters, and other people in the frontier, signed a public protest that opposed the rebellion towards the King. In that same year, Continental Army Captains Pannill and Walton arrived at Fort James and told the rangers to surrender their post. Capt. Powell and Lt. Waters firmly refused to surrender, but their colonial rangers promptly abandoned the fort and joined the Georgia Continentals. Waters remained extremely unwilling of joining the resistance. In 1777, the Georgia Executive Council attempted to commission Waters to be the justice of the peace, but Patriot leaders refused and wanted to commission a different person.

On February of 1779, the British Army captured the city of Savannah. British forces advanced as far north as Augusta, and swore as many as 14,000 Georgians to the oath of the King. The Ceded Lands/Wilkes County was yet to be conquered. Later, however, the Ceded Lands offered to surrender all their forts in the area and take allegiance to the King. Many soldiers and forts in the frontier submitted to the British and when troops arrived at Waters' plantation, Waters sworn into the oath of the King and joined the Loyalists' cause. On August 28, 1779, Thomas Waters stood before a Wilkes County grand jury and the court condemned Waters for aiding the Tories.

=== Service in the Loyalist militia ===
Between 1779-80, the British invaded more of Georgia, and Loyalist forces had the opportunity to restore the royal crown into Georgia. Afterwards, Georgia reverted to a colonial status, and Sir James Wright was reinstated as the governor. Because of this, Thomas Waters joined the Fifth Colonial Militia Regiment (Ceded Lands), a Loyalist militia, as a colonel and justice of the peace.

By 1780, Wright and many other Loyalists feared that the war would resurge after months of pacifism. Matters worsened after Sir Henry Clinton, the British Commander of North America, drafted almost the entire male population of Georgia and South Carolina into colonial militias. The colonial Georgia assembly prohibited anyone who supported the Patriots' cause to run for public office. Loyalists were in fear of the heightening tensions after Elijah Clarke, and 400 Patriot partisans, attacked and nearly captured a Loyalist garrison and indigenous soldiers in Augusta, which were under the command of Lieutenant Colonel Thomas Brown. In response to these attacks by Clarke, the Loyalists wanted to seek vengeance for what the Patriot partisans had done. Lieutenant Colonel John Harris Cruger immediately dispatched Thomas Waters, and his Fifth Colonial Militia, to ravage through Wilkes County, which was the origin of Clarke's following. Thomas Waters followed Cruger's orders and raided all throughout the Ceded Lands, destroying more than 100 homes. 60 Patriots were captured by Waters' men and imprisoned. Cruger ordered death sentences on all of the prisoners.

Later that year, Cruger, Brown, and Waters realized that the rebellion had worsened after it was reported that more Georgians joined Patriot militias while the colonial militias declined. In response to this, Cruger, who was also in control of the Ninety-Six District, ordered Thomas Waters and his Colonial Militia to the Ninety-Six District and punish suspected Patriots in the Fairforest Creek Area.

=== Battle of Hammond's Store ===
In December of 1780, Thomas Waters and his militia ravaged through the Fairforest Creek area, where they looted and burned Patriot settlements. As Waters and his men were marching to William's Fort, they stopped at Hammond's Old Store, near present-day Clinton, South Carolina, for lunch. As they were at Hammond's Store, William Washington and his men ambushed Waters' militia. The colonial militiamen did not fire a shot at Washington's men. After the battle, Thomas Waters suffered defeat after 150 of his men were killed, 50 were wound, and 40 were imprisoned.

=== Patriots Regaining Georgia ===
In 1781, Whig partisans, such as McCall, Cunningham, and Clarke, returned to Georgia in order to regain the province from British possession. Men from Eastern Tennessee joined Clarke (as well as the Loyalists) in midst of the Patriot efforts. After the battle of Hammond's Store, Thomas Waters only had a small remainder of his colonial militia left. With his remaining soldiers, he won in smaller, more local battles, but was unable to save Georgia's colonial status. In February 1781, Thomas Waters stated that eleven of his neighbors were murdered.

In April 1781, Thomas Waters ordered slaves to build Fort Cornwallis, a massive fortification in Augusta that prevented future Patriot attacks. On June 1, 1781, however, Thomas Waters, his militia, and other Loyalists surrendered to Lieutenant Colonel Henry Lee, Brigadier General Andrew Pickens, and Lieutenant Colonel Elijah Clarke. Colonel Thomas Brown, Thomas Waters, and other Loyalists were taken as prisoners and travelled to Savannah, where they would be released. However, Major Henry Williams, Waters' commander, was severely wounded in an assassination attempt from one of Clarke's men.

=== Affiliation with the Cherokees ===
After the surrender at Fort Cornwallis, Thomas Waters was appointed Deputy Superintendent of the Cherokees by Sir Henry Clinton in January 1782. Waters resided in a Cherokee village called Long Swamp, which was near present-day Ball Ground, Georgia. From there, he organized a Loyalist army of 1,000 Cherokee warriors. However, in September 1782, Pickens, with 400 men, and Clarke, with 100 men, stormed through and ransacked the Cherokee Nation in the pursuit of finding Waters. Pickens and Clarke destroyed the village of Long Swamp. Waters, along with his followers, fled from the Patriots.

== Evacuation to Florida ==
By December 14, 1782, the British have completely abandoned Georgia and South Carolina. Thomas Waters, along with the Cherokees, fled to St. Augustine right when East Florida became Spanish possession. Waters was financially desperate after he had lost £9,111 (£1.8 million or US $2.4 million in today's money). Waters worked as a grocer and was married to Sally (Sarah) Hughes, who was related to his former business associate, John Vann. Waters had 2 biological children and one adopted child in East Florida with his wife Sally. In 1783, Waters filed a claim to the British government for his losses, and received £4,824 (£929.5 thousand or US $1.27 million in today's money) as well as £60 (£11.56 thousand or US $15.8 thousand in today's money) per annum pension.

== Last Years ==
In 1786, Thomas Waters and his then six-year-old son, George Morgan Waters, sold all of his slaves and portable property. Afterwards, they moved to New Providence, Bahamas, but then to England. After the American Revolution, the state of Georgia found Waters guilty for treason and confiscated his Savannah River plantation to his nemesis, Elijah Clarke. By 1800, Waters had tried to collect all of the debts that he owed before the war. In 1810 (or 1813), Thomas Waters died in London. Waters' son, George, was educated in England and moved to Bryan County, Georgia, along with his sister Mary, in the 1790s. George, with his father's fortune, became a prominent and wealthy plantation owner. Mary then married Alexander McQueen Netherclift.
