= Battle of Hammond's Store =

1780 battle during the American Revolutionary War

Battle of Hammond's Store (also called Battle of Hammond's Old Store)
- Part of American Revolutionary War
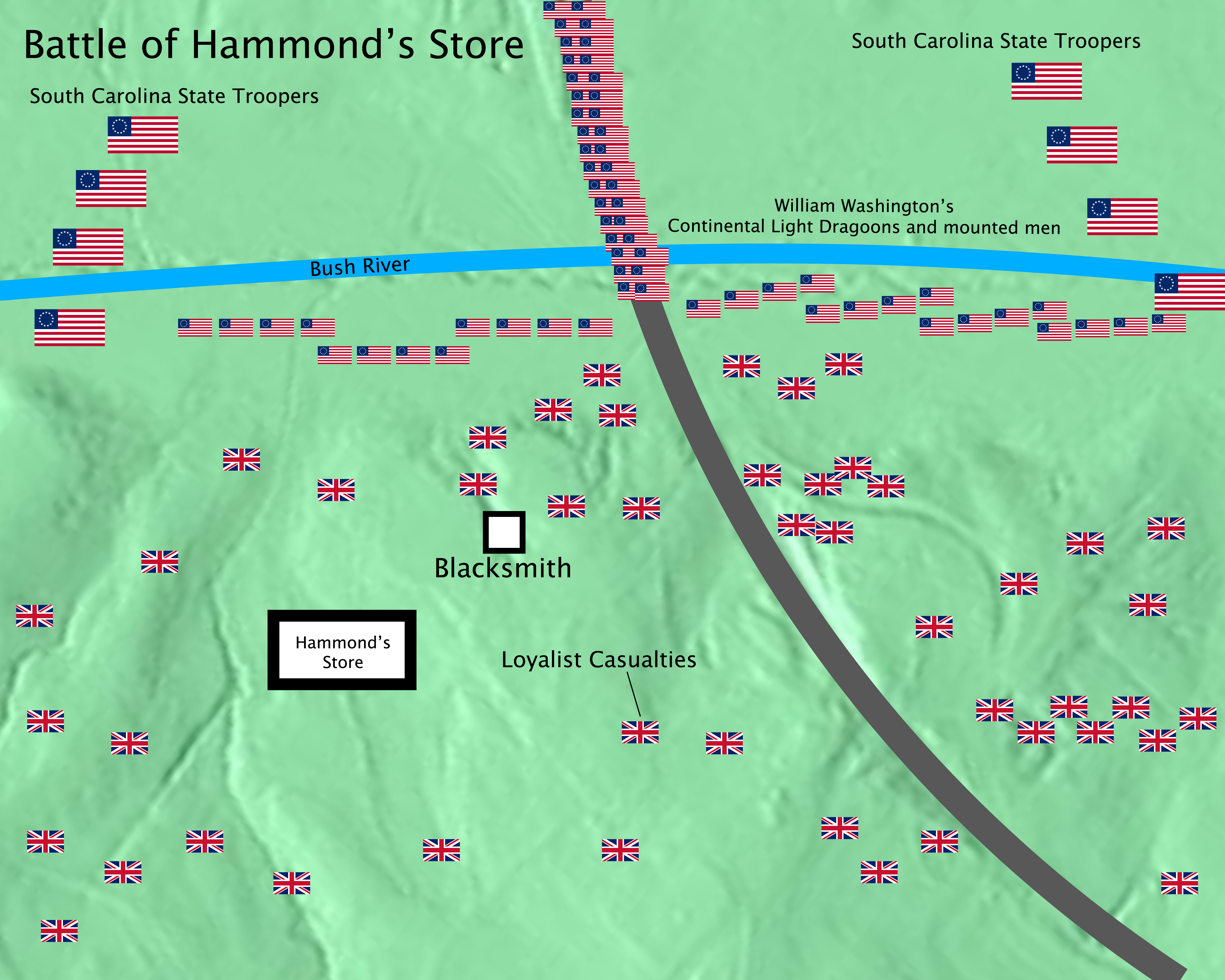
- Map of the battle at Hammond's Store
Date	December 30, 1780
Location	Laurens County, South Carolina, near Clinton, South Carolina 34.42440652285151°N 81.87751273810444°W
Result	American victory

Belligerents
United States: (United States) Patriots	(Kingdom of Great Britain) Great Britain: (Kingdom of Great Britain) Loyalists

Commanders and leaders
(United States) William Washington	(Kingdom of Great Britain) Thomas Waters

Units involved
(United States) 1st Continental Light Dragoons (United States) 3rd Continental Light Dragoons (United States) Little River District Militia/ Regiment (United States) 2nd Spartan Regiment (United States) Lower Ninety-Six Regiment (United States) Georgia Wilkes County Refugee Militia	(Kingdom of Great Britain) Wilkes County Militia (Kingdom of Great Britain) Spartan District Militia (Kingdom of Great Britain) Ninety-Six Militia

Strength
280 soldiers	260 soldiers

Casualties and losses
0 killed	100 killed 50 injured 40 captured

The Battle of Hammond’s Store was a conflict that occurred at Hammond’s Old Store near modern-day Clinton, Laurens County, South Carolina. The battle happened in response to Lieutenant Colonel Thomas Waters’ raids of Patriot settlements in South Carolina.

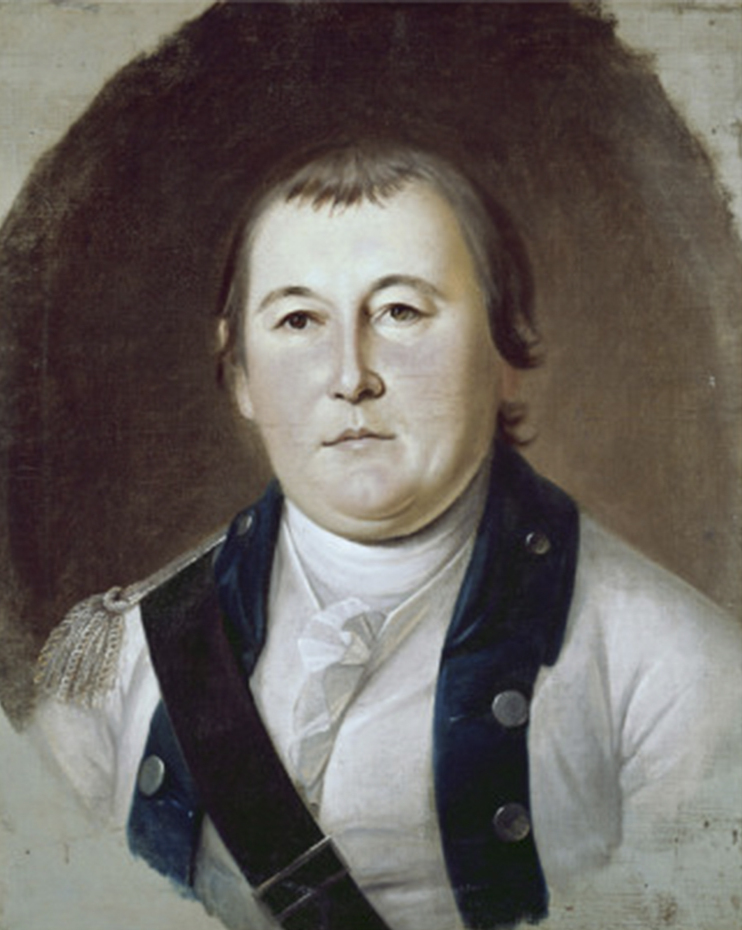
William Washington commanded the skirmishes at Hammond's Old Store and William's Fort

On Christmas Day of 1780, Brigadier General Daniel Morgan called on Lieutenant Colonel William Washington to attack Lieutenant Colonel Thomas Waters’ men after getting word of his destructive movement through South Carolina. Washington rounded up two Continental dragoons and four militias to combat Waters’ men. The Patriots ultimately won in this battle.

== Background ==
In November of 1780, General Daniel Morgan arrived at the Patriot camp in Charlotte, where he was promoted to Brigadier General after he was given the duty to command a brigade of the Southern army. On December 2, 1780, Major General Nathanael Greene was sent to Charlotte by General George Washington and accepted the offer to lead the Southern theater, in which Greene promptly took the place of General Horatio Gates.

On that same month, Major General Greene divided his command into two parts: Brigadier General Morgan in command of the Backcountry of South Carolina, and Greene in command of the other. The splitting of the Southern Department was proven to be a good move as it paved way for more resupplying and recruiting after the horrid Battle of Camden.

== Prelude ==
On December 25, 1780, Brigadier General Daniel Morgan and his men were encamped along the Pacolet River at Grindall Shoals, South Carolina, which was the plantation of a captured Loyalist. On that day, Morgan received intelligence from a scout that a Loyalist, Lieutenant Colonel Thomas Waters, banded with a Savannah militia in the Fairforest Creek region, between Winnsborough and Ninety Six, to loot, raid, and torch settlements of Patriot families.

Once Morgan became aware of Waters’ pillaging, he immediately dispatched Lieutenant Colonel William Washington and his dragoons and militiamen to harass and combat Waters’ front. William Washington, the second cousin of George Washington, was a highly skilled field officer of the head of calvary in the Northern theater of the war. Washington immediately arrived in the area with his dragoons and militias. Thomas Waters and his men learned that Washington and his dragoons and militia were headed towards where they were, so they retreated back southwards to Fort Williams, the plantation of the then recently deceased James Williams turned Loyalist fort, in Ninety-Six.

== Battle ==
On December 30, 1780, as Waters and his militiamen were fleeing from the incoming Patriots, they stopped for a midday lunch at Hammond’s Old Store, which was 25 miles from the post at Ninety-Six. While Waters’ men were near Hammond’s Store, Washington and his troops were spying on them from a hill after they tracked them down for more than 40 miles.

The dragoons wasted no time to attack, and immediately drew their sabers and charged at the Tories from the hill. The dragoons, and then the militiamen, ambushed the Tories. The militiamen opened fire at the flanks with their rifles. Many of the Loyalists immediately scattered, but were hunted down by the Patriots and were sliced, dismembered, and slaughtered. Not a single Tory fired a shot. The Tories who did not die were badly wounded and mutilated. The remaining Loyalists were captured and imprisoned by the Patriot troops.

== Aftermath ==
After the battle, Brigadier General Daniel Morgan reported that 100 Loyalists were killed, 50 were wounded, and 40 were captured. The Loyalists who survived the battle fled to William’s Fort. William Washington then ordered Colonel Joseph Hayes’ Little River Regiment of Militia and Cornet James Simon, who was in command of ten dragoons, to attack William’s Fort.

The militia and dragoons marched to the Loyalist fort and gave their commander, Brigadier General Robert Cunningham, who was appointed by Lord Cornwallis, and other Loyalist officials 30 minutes to surrender before the men attacked. While the Patriots consulted with the Loyalist officials, some Tory troops sneaked out from the back of the fort and fled into the woods. Cunningham and more of his troops promptly abandoned their fort as the Patriots attacked, and left five more Loyalists dead, thirty wounded, and more captured. The fort was then burned down. However, some reports say that the fort was left intact, but food and stores were stolen.

After Cornwallis learned of the Patriots' attacks and skirmishes at Hammond's Old Store and William's Fort, he dispatched Lieutenant Colonel Banastre Tarleton to move southwards to Ninety-Six. These series of events led to the Battle of Cowpens.
