= Battle of Van Creek =

1779 American Revolutionary War battle

Coordinates: 34°8′35.4″N 82°42′33.48″W

- Part of the American Revolutionary War
Date	February 11, 1779
Location	Elberton, Georgia
Result	Loyalist victory

Belligerents
United States	(Kingdom of Great Britain) Loyalist militia

Commanders and leaders
William Baskins; John Miller	John Boyd

Strength
100 Militia	600 Militia

Casualties and losses
1 killed 15 wounded 17 captured	Perhaps 100 lost; mostly deserted

The Battle of Van Creek was a small engagement on February 11, 1779, near Elberton, Georgia, during the American Revolutionary War. About 100 Patriot militia men sought to stop a Loyalist force of about 600 men from crossing the Savannah River to rendezvous with a British force which had recently captured Augusta, Georgia. The Loyalist force was able to flank and defeat the Patriot militia and cross the river. However, the Loyalists lost about 100 men, almost all through desertions, and suffered its own defeat and further losses a few days later at the Battle of Kettle Creek.
