= Battle of Beattie's Mill =

Coordinates: 34.265°N 82.307°W

- Part of American Revolutionary War
Date	March 21, 1781
Location	Abbeville County, South Carolina
Result	American victory

Belligerents
United States	Great Britain

Commanders and leaders
Elijah Clarke	James Dunlop

Units involved
Lt. Col. James McCall's South Carolina militia and Georgia (U.S. state) cavalry	Capt. Daniel Cozens New Jersey Volunteers and Loyalist Queens Rangers

Strength
180	90

Casualties and losses
0	34 (+42 missing and captured)

The Battle of Beattie's Mill was an American Revolutionary War confrontation in Abbeville County, South Carolina, that occurred on March 21, 1781. Continental Army forces under Colonel Elijah Clarke encountered and fought Tory forces under British Major James Dunlap. In the ensuing battle, 74 British troops were killed, captured or missing including Major Dunlap.

== Before battle ==
Following the Battle Battle of Wetzell's Mill on March 6, 1781, Continental Major General Nathanael Greene sent Brigadier General Andrew Pickens to refit Patriot forces in South Carolina. Before this, Maj. James Dunlop (also spelt as Dunlap) and his Tory forces were also sent by Major Patrick Ferguson to forage before the Battle of Kings Mountain on October 9, 1780. During this, Dunlap torched Pickens' plantation and crops. In March 1781, when Dunlap was on the March in Abbeville County, Pickens sent Colonel Elijah Clarke with Georgian cavalry and a South Carolina militia under Lieutenant Colonel James McCall.

== The battle ==
The battle began when Colonel Clarke's forces ambushed Maj. Dunlop's forces at Beattie's Mill in the Little River area. The South Carolina militia attacked Dunlap's forces while James McCall and the cavalry took control of a bridge behind Dunlap to prevent retreat. Clarke's forces were without adequate arms, however, they outnumbered the British forces and soon captured James Dunlop and the Tories surrendered after four hours of fighting.

== Aftermath ==
Following the battle, Pickens made a rendezvous with Clarke and the troops were escorted. During this, Maj. Dunlap was murdered with a pistol by American military officer, Arthur Cobb, while being held as a prisoner of war at Gilbert Town, North Carolina. The murder was condemned by Pickens who labeled it with “horror and detestation" and reported the murder to Major General Greene and British Colonel John Harris Cruger at Ninety Six.
