= Battle of Round Mountain (1776) =

Battle of the American Revolutionary War in North Carolina

- Part of the American Revolutionary War
Date	June 1, 1776
Location	Near present-day Columbus, North Carolina 35°15′8″N 82°11′55″W
Result	Patriot/Catawba victory

Belligerents
Cherokee	Patriot militia Catawba

Commanders and leaders
Big Warrior †	Thomas Howard; Skyuka

Strength
Unknown	Unknown

Casualties and losses
Reportedly almost entire force	Unknown

The Battle of Round Mountain took place on June 1, 1776, near modern-day Columbus, North Carolina, pitting the Cherokee against Patriot militia forces that received some assistance from the Catawba.

== History ==
In late Spring of 1776, a delegation had been sent from the Patriots to the Cherokee to promote peace. Brothers and Patriot Captains Edward and Preston Hampton had been sent as representatives. However, the meeting was unsuccessful, and both men were subsequently taken captive by the Cherokee. The two brothers managed to escape and returned to their homesteads. Shortly after, Cherokee representatives came upon the homestead of Preston. Preston told his children to go warn his neighbors of the Cherokee's presence. Preston's father, Anthony, came out to speak to the Cherokee. As Anthony was speaking with their leader, Big Warrior, another Cherokee mortally wounded Preston and Big Warrior killed Anthony. Preston's wife and infant son were later killed.

== Aftermath ==
After the attack, the men of the nearby settlement met at a blockhouse on the Pacolet River to discuss retaliation. With assistance from some Catawba under the guidance of Skyuka, a counterattack was launched on the Cherokee at the Hampton homestead after nighttime fell. The Cherokee were taken by surprise and reportedly almost all of them were killed. Today, there is a monument in Columbus, North Carolina dedicated to the battle.
