= Mathias James O'Conway =

Mathias James O'Conway, a.k.a. Matha Ó Conmhai (3 February 1766 – 28 November 1842) was a linguist and lexicographer.

== Life ==
O'Conway was born in Galway town to Matthias O'Conway, said to have been a town merchant, and his wife, Isabel Ni hOgáin. He had an older brother, Seán ('John)'. A Gaeilgeoir (native Irish speaker), Ó Conmhai only learned English from age eight upon attending the Augustinian school in the town. By his own account he first became intrigued with languages upon coming into contact with Jewish refugees from Gibraltar when he was aged about fourteen, about 1780. Following a street fracas in Dublin in early 1783 Ó Conmhai was obliged to leave Ireland, never to return.

He first settled in Grenada in the Caribbean; by April 1784 he was living in Philadelphia. He became a member of the Pennsylvania militia, and was posted to the territory of the Seneca, learning elements of "three of their languages."

He married Rebecca Archer of Carlisle, Penn., who was the American-born daughter of an Irish couple. Their first child, Ceclia, was born in December 1787 by which time he set himself up as a schoolteacher in Pittsburgh. The couple would have nine children, eight of who survived childhood, two sons dying young in Latin America.

O'Conway worked for decades on several monumental philological works, but much was unpublished. Some of his papers were lost, but a great deal survives in the National Library of Ireland, Dublin. They show awareness of the works of Bishop John O'Brien and Aodh Buidhe Mac Cruitin, but clearly contains his own independent research and conclusions.

"O'Conway was almost certainly the first person to write and publish language-learning books in the United States. One of these, his "Hispano-Anglo grammar" (1810), was a grammar of Spanish for the English speaker and also a book of dialogues and topical vocabulary lists of everyday use. ... O'Conway's life and work thus await serious study from those who can evaluate his contribution to the evolution of linguistics and language teaching in the United States and his place in the history of Irish and indeed Spanish lexicography."
