= Battle of McIntyre Farm =

American Revolution skirmish in North Carolina

Coordinates: 35.313°N 80.864°W

- Part of American Revolutionary War
Date	October 3, 1780
Location	Mecklenburg County, North Carolina
Result	Patriot victory

Belligerents
Kingdom of Great Britain; Loyalist militia	(United States) Patriot militia

Commanders and leaders
John Doyle; Lewis Davis (WIA)(POW) (Hesse) Jakob Hurst †	(United States) James Thompson

Strength
450 regulars and militia 60 cavalry 40 wagons (of which 100 were engaged at McIntyre's farm)	Initially 14 militia, later assisted by unknown number of volunteers

Casualties and losses
8 killed 12 wounded	None recorded

The Battle of McIntyre Farm took place on October 3, 1780 between Patriot militia under Captain James Thompson and a combined force of British regulars and Loyalists under Captain John Doyle in northern Mecklenburg county, North Carolina. The event is also known as the "Battle of the Bees" or the "Battle of the Hornets Nest".

Lt. General Charles Cornwallis had occupied Charlotte since September 26, 1780. While there, he sent a foraging party of 450 infantry, 60 cavalry, and about 40 wagons to the countryside to search for supplies. Captain James Thompson of the local militia was warned by a local boy who had spotted them. The British forces had stopped seven miles up the road at McIntyre's Farm with the Patriot militia behind them out of sight. It was at McIntyre's farm that Doyle left behind 100 soldiers and 10 wagons to forage supplies.

As some of the British were loading up wagons with supplies, some others had accidentally knocked over some bee hives causing a commotion. As this happened, the Patriots opened fire. Hitting their targets with accuracy and constantly changing position, it appeared to the British that the Patriots were in larger number than perceived. Many patriots from the neighborhood and surrounding area would join in on the fight. Capt. Doyle believed that his men were being attacked by a much larger force and ordered a quick retreat back to Charlotte. Some of the horses drawing the supply wagons were shot during the engagement which caused the road to be blocked which caused most of the supplies to be left behind.

The McIntyre Farmhouse was one of the oldest buildings in Mecklenburg county. It still bore musket ball holes until 1941 when it was demolished by the land's private owner. As the British withdrew from the area after a 16 day occupation, they would regard it as "Hornet's Nest". Honored by this act of heroism, it has been adopted by Charlotte and Mecklenburg county as its insignia. It can be seen on the seal of the City of Charlotte, the City's Professional basketball team, and other local organizations.

Today there are two monuments dedicated to the skirmish that are located just off Beatties Ford Road at the intersection with McIntyre Avenue in Charlotte, NC.
