= Meriam's Corner =

Battle of the American Revolutionary War

- Part of the battles of Lexington and Concord
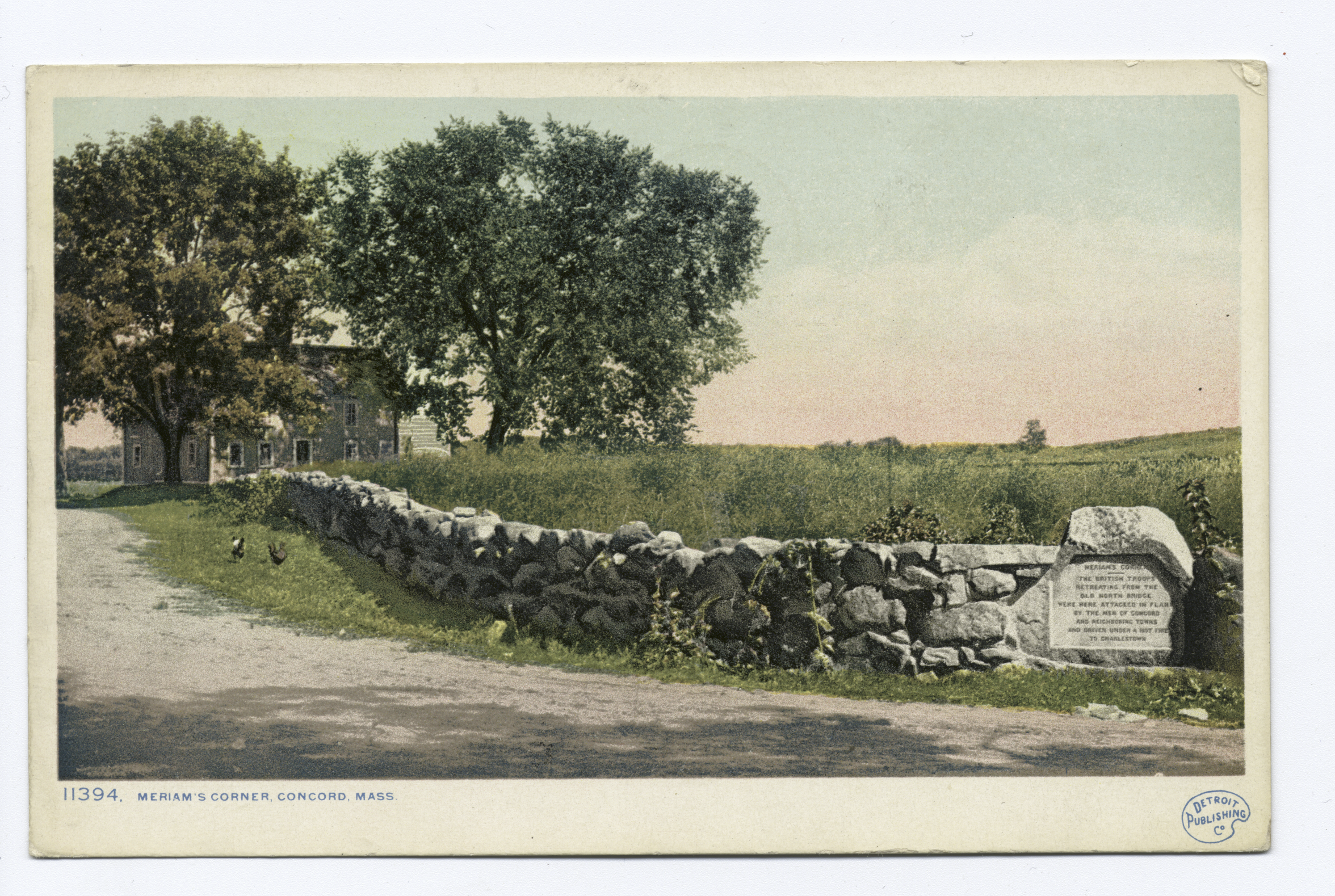
- An early-20th-century postcard of Meriam's Corner, looking northeast. In view is the Nathan Meriam House
Date	April 19, 1775 (251 years ago)
Location	Concord, Massachusetts 42.4594745°N 71.324283°W
Result	Massachusetts Bay victory

Belligerents
(Province of Massachusetts Bay) Massachusetts Bay	Great Britain

Commanders and leaders
(Province of Massachusetts Bay) William Heath (Province of Massachusetts Bay) Joseph Warren	(Kingdom of Great Britain) Francis Smith

Strength
200–500 militia and minutemen	700+

Casualties and losses
0	2
- Location within Massachusetts Meriam's Corner (the United States)

Meriam's Corner is a historic American Revolutionary War site associated with the revolution's first battle, the 1775 battles of Lexington and Concord. It is located, on the former Battle Road, at the junction of today's Lexington Road and Old Bedford Road in Concord, Massachusetts, and is named for the Meriam family who lived there. The Nathan Meriam House still stands beside Old Bedford Road and forms part of Meriam's Corner itself. Both the house and Meriam's Corner are part of the Minute Man National Historic Park. Three of the Meriam family's homes stood here in 1775, the other two belonging to Josiah Meriam, brother of Nathan, and their nephew John.

In the early afternoon of April 19, 1775, it was the site of the first offensive between the British regulars, who were retreating from Concord to Boston, and the colonial militia. The regulars had made the outbound journey that morning, with the first defensive conflict of that journey having been in the dawn hours on Lexington Common.

A stone marking the nearby burial site of at least one of the two British soldiers killed during the skirmish stands on the western side of Old Bedford Road, near to the junction with Lexington Road.

Another stone marker, installed in 1885 in the wall at the apex of the corner, reads:

The British troops
retreating from the
Old North Bridge
were here attacked in flank
by the men of Concord
and neighboring towns and driven under a hot fire
to Charlestown''

== Redcoats' retreat to Boston ==
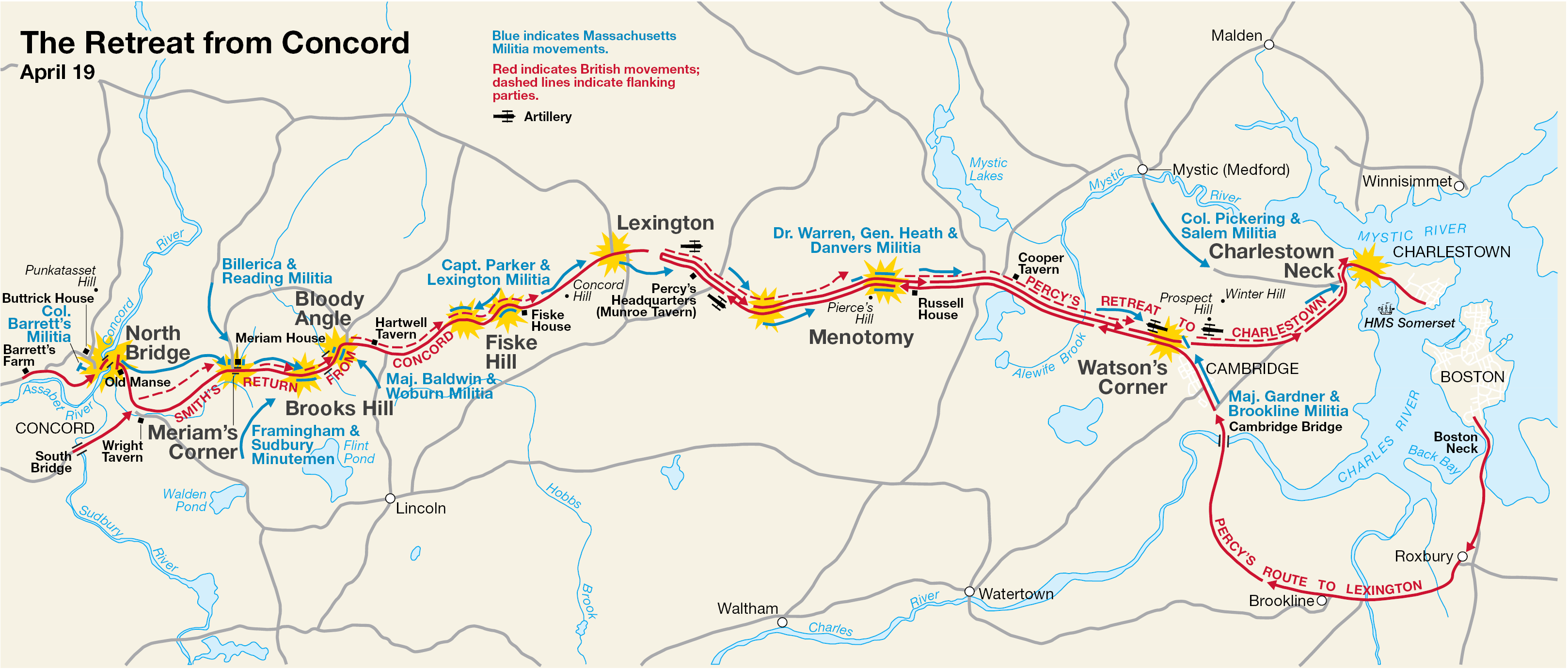
A National Park Service map showing the redcoats' retreat from Concord

Lieutenant Colonel Francis Smith, concerned about the safety of his men, sent flankers to follow a ridge and protect his forces from the roughly one thousand colonials now in the field as the British marched east out of Concord. This ridge ended near Meriam's Corner, a crossroads about a mile (2 km) outside the village of Concord, where the main road came to a narrow bridge across Elm Brook, a tributary of the Shawsheen River. To cross the bridge, the British had to pull the flankers back into the main column and close ranks to a mere three soldiers abreast. Colonial militia companies arriving from the north and east had converged at this point and presented a clear numerical advantage over the regulars. The British were now witnessing once again what General Thomas Gage had hoped to avoid by dispatching the expedition in secrecy and in the dark of night: the ability of the colonial militiamen to rise and converge by the thousands when British forces ventured out of Boston. As the last of the British column marched over the bridge, the British rear guard wheeled and fired a volley at the colonial militiamen, who had been firing irregularly and ineffectively from a distance but now had closed to within musket range. The colonists returned fire, this time with deadly effect. Two regulars were killed and perhaps six wounded, with no colonial casualties. Smith sent out his flanking troops again after crossing the small bridge.
