= Battle of Videau's Bridge =

- Part of the American Revolutionary War
Date	January 3, 1782
Location	Charles Town District, currently Berkeley County, South Carolina
Result	British victory

Belligerents
United States	Great Britain

Commanders and leaders
(United States) Colonel Richard Richardson	(Kingdom of Great Britain) Majors William Brereton, John Coffin

Strength
400	360

Casualties and losses
22 killed 6 wounded	4 killed 14 wounded 1 captured

The Battle of Videau's Bridge (also known as Smith's plantation) was an engagement of the American Revolutionary War fought on January 3, 1782 in Charles Town District, currently Berkeley County, South Carolina. The British routed an American force opposing a foraging expedition they sent from Charleston. The British claimed to kill 57 and capture 20 Americans.

== Order of Battle ==
Patriots:

- 400 men under the command of Col. Richard Richardson, Jr.
- Berkeley County Regiment of Militia detachment led by Col. Richard Richardson, Jr. with two known companies, led by:
  - Capt. William Capers
  - Capt. Gavin Witherspoon
- South Carolina 3rd Regiment of State Dragoons (State Troops) detachment led by Major Samuel Cooper, with three known companies, led by:
  - Capt. William Bennett
  - Capt. George Sinclair Capers (wounded)
  - Capt. John Carraway Smith

British/Loyalists:

- 360 men commanded by Major William Brereton
- British Regulars, Grenadiers & Light Infantry led by Major William Brereton
- NY Volunteers, Major John Coffin's Troop of Mounted Infantry led by Major John Coffin
- SC Royalists detachment led by Capt. Archibald Campbell (killed)
- Volunteers of Ireland led by Major John Doyle
- Independent Troop of Black Dragoons (Loyalists) led by Capt. March with Lt. Mingo
