= Battle of Wambaw =

Battle in the American Revolutionary War

- Part of the American Revolutionary War
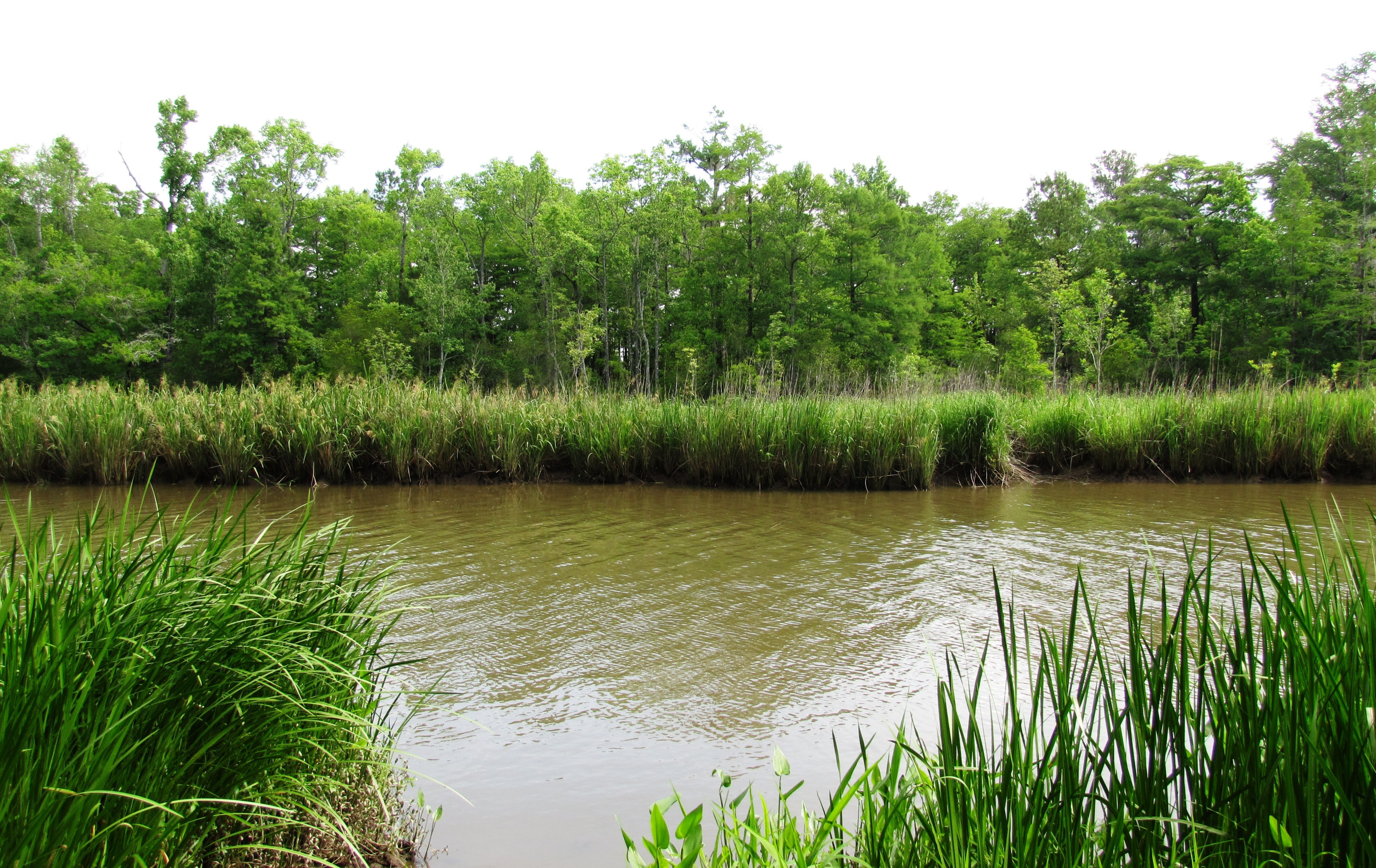
- The Wambaw Creek.
Date	February 24, 1782
Location	Berkeley County, South Carolina
Result	British victory

Belligerents
United States	Great Britain

Commanders and leaders
William Benison †; Archibald McDonald	Benjamin Thompson

Strength
~500	~700

Casualties and losses
10 killed 8 wounded	1 wounded

The Battle of Wambaw was an engagement of the American Revolutionary War fought on February 24, 1782 near Charleston, South Carolina.

== Background ==
In January 1782, Brig. Gen. Francis Marion was elected to the South Carolina General Assembly and left to take his seat, relinquishing command of the militia forces to Lt. Col. Peter Horry, who lead the men to set up camp along the Wambaw river. Soon after, Horry fell ill and returned to his plantation home to recover, leaving command to Major William Benison.

== Battle ==
Loyalist Lt Col. Benjamin Thompson learned of the patriot camp and planned an attack on it. He assembled a force of around 700 men made up of elements from the Volunteers of Ireland, the 13th Regiment of Foot, Maj. John Coffin's dragoons, and the Independent Troop of Black Dragoons. Thompson led his men out in the early morning of February 23.

The next day, patriot scouts reported to Major Benison that they had seen British forces marching toward their position, but he dismissed the report. Later that day, British forces attacked the camp, forcing the militia forces to retreat across the river over the Wambaw ridge. Patriot forces tried to make a stand on the high ground across the river, but were forced to retreat from there as well. Thompson called off the attack at night fall. Major William Benison was killed in the battle.
