= Delaware festivals =

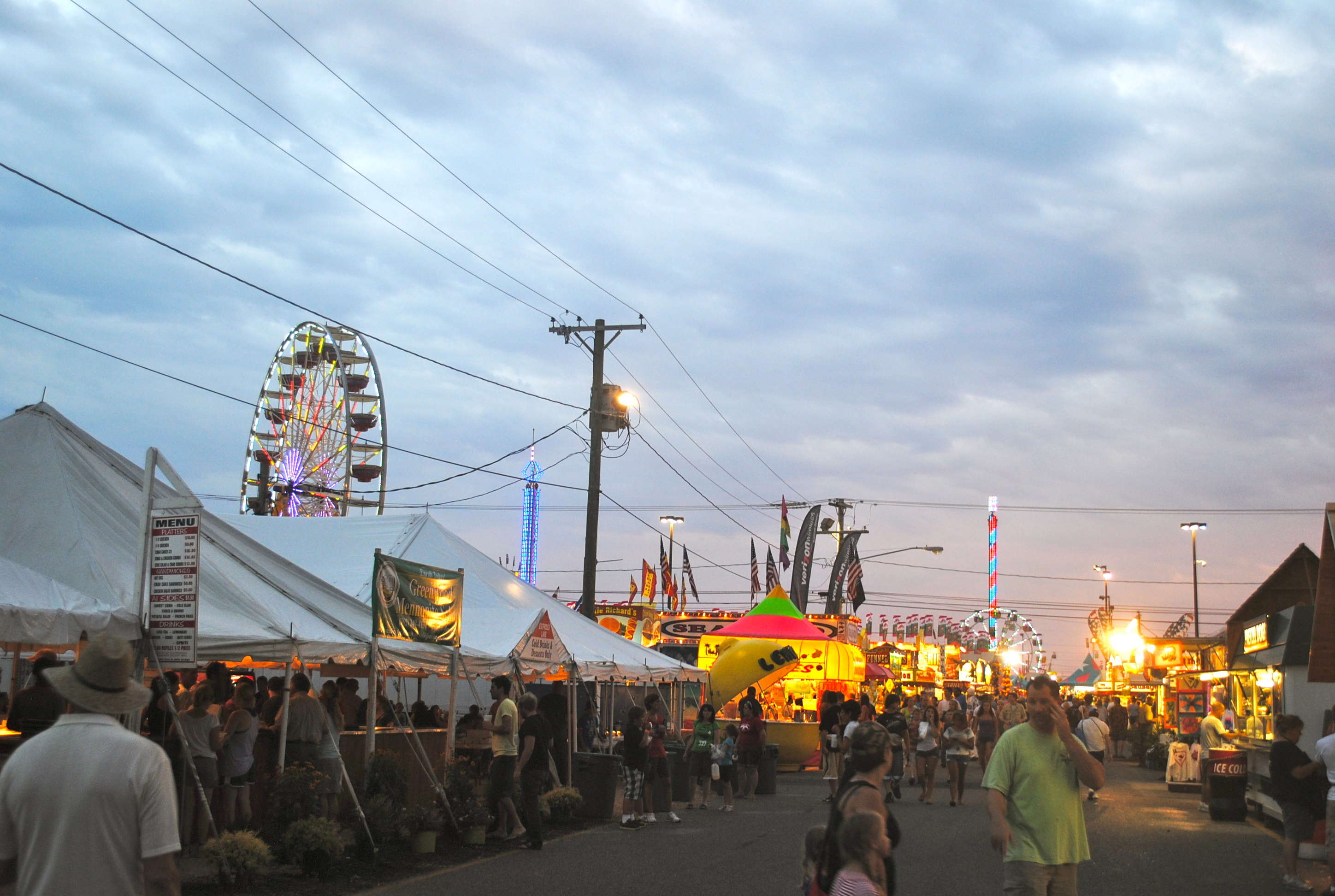
Delaware State Fair

There are several annual festivals in the U.S. state of Delaware.

- The Firefly Music Festival is an annual four-day music festival which was first held in July 2012. It is held at The Woodlands, an 87-acre site adjacent to Dover Downs in Dover. The festival features nationally-known musical acts performing on several stages over a four-day period. Headliner acts for 2012 included The Killers, The Black Keys and Jack White, and included 48 total acts. The festival grounds also feature camping areas, food and beverage venues. Approximately 30,000 people attended the 2012 festival.
- The Big August Quarterly (also referred to as the "Big Quarterly" or "August Quarterly") is an annual religious festival held in Wilmington, Delaware. The festival was started in 1814 by Peter Spencer in connection with the "quarterly" meeting (or "conference") of the African Union Church. Out of the four meetings during the year, the one in August became the "annual conference" of the Church when ministers' assignments for the next year were announced, among other business — it was a time for free blacks and slaves alike to come together from the multi-state area and celebrate their faith with singing, dancing, testifying, and feasting. It is the oldest such celebration in the country. Senator Joe Biden's remarks on the significance of the "Big Quarterly" were published in the Congressional Record for 30 July 1981 (Vol. 127, No. 117) and for 9 August 1984 (Vol 130, No. 106).
- The Delaware State Fair (also known as the Harrington Fair) is Delaware's only state fair. The Delaware State Fair occurs during the last two weeks of July. During the fair, various musical acts perform at the Grand Stand. The Grand Stand is also used for a Demolition Derbys, circus performances, and other entertainment.
- The Delaware Sängerbund (German for Singers Alliance) holds an annual three-day-long Oktoberfest. The Oktoberfest features carnival rides, German foods, and demonstrations of German singing and dancing.
- The Delaware Shakespeare Festival is an outdoor Shakespeare festival that takes place during the summer months at Rockwood Park located near Wilmington. The mission of the Delaware Shakespeare Festival is to create professional theatre and educational programs in order to further the understanding and appreciation of Shakespeare’s works.
- Wilmington is home to several ethnic festivals sponsored by traditional ethnic churches in the city. The most popular is the Italian Festival hosted held each June in the neighborhood surrounding St. Anthony of Padua Roman Catholic Church. A highlight of the Italian Festival is a procession of the church's statues of saints throughout the community on the last afternoon of the festival. St. Hedwig Roman Catholic Church sponsors a Polish festival along the city Riverfront each October and Holy Trinity Greek Orthodox Church presents a Greek Festival at the church ground each June. These ethic festivals all feature carnival rides, ethnic foods and craft, and musical performances.
- At the end of October, Rehoboth Beach holds its annual Sea Witch Halloween and Fiddlers' Festival.
- The Clifford Brown Jazz Festival is a free jazz music festival held annually at Rodney Square in Wilmington in honor of Wilmington native and respected jazz trumpeter Clifford Brown. The first festival was held in 1989 on the open lawn in the central area of the city.
- The Wilmington Flower Market is a held each May in Wilmington's Rockford Park. The Flower Market is a three-day long festival which serves as a fundraiser for charitable organizations which benefit Delaware's children.
- The weekend after Halloween, Sussex County hosted the World Championship Punkin Chunkin, where pumpkins were shot from devices such as air-powered cannons, trebuchets, catapults, and various other contraptions. The performance of various styles and classes of devices was supplemented by food booths and musical performances. The Punkin Chunkin was not held in 2014 and 2015 due to legal and insurance issues and was cancelled after 2016.
- During the second weekend in October, Bridgeville hosts its annual Apple Scrapple Festival. The carnival centers around the preparation and consumption of apples and scrapple and also includes contests, live entertainment, a car show, a tractor pull, and craft shows.
- On the second Saturday in March the Chocolate Festival at the Rehoboth Beach Convention Center features chocolate made by professionals, amateurs, bakeries, and children.
- A tradition that is unique to Delaware is Return Day, which occurs every two years on the Thursday following the November general election. Believed to be the only event of its kind in the United States, it is a continuation of a tradition that dates back to Delaware's earliest days in the 18th century. Festivities include the reading of election results from the Sussex County Courthouse balcony by the town crier, a parade in which winners and losers ride together in open coaches, the roasting of an ox behind the courthouse, and the ceremonial and symbolic "burying of the hatchet" in sand from Lewes Beach.
- Dover Days is celebrated in mid-spring to early summer in Dover, Delaware and features the town's history and culture. The festival's highlight is a parade, followed by carnival rides and food stands along the historic Green downtown.
- The Peach Festival is celebrated on the first Saturday of August every year in Wyoming, Delaware, 3 miles away from Dover.
