= 1778 in Delaware =

- Decades: 1760s; 1770s; 1780s; 1790s
- See also: History of Delaware; Historical outline of Delaware; List of years in Delaware; 1778 in the United States

This is a list of events in 1778 in Delaware.

== Incumbents ==
- Governor: George Read (until March 31), Caesar Rodney (since March 31)

== Events ==
- March 31 – Caesar Rodney is sworn in as the 4th president succeeding George Read (now governor).
- October 20 – 3rd Delaware General Assembly convenes succeeding the 2nd.

== See also ==
- 1778 in the United States
- List of years in Delaware
