= 1779 in Delaware =

- Decades: 1760s; 1770s; 1780s; 1790s
- See also: History of Delaware; Historical outline of Delaware; List of years in Delaware; 1779 in the United States

This is a list of events in 1779 in Delaware.

== Incumbents ==
- Governor: Caesar Rodney

== Events ==
- October 20 – The 4th Delaware General Assembly convenes succeeding the 3rd.

== Births ==
- August 6 – Henry M. Ridgely, lawyer and politician (d. 1847)

== Deaths ==
- July 14 – George Ross, Founding Father and congressman (b. 1730)

=== Undated ===
- Francis Alison, leading minister in the Synod of Philadelphia during The Old Side-New Side Controversy (b. 1705 in Ireland)

== See also ==
- 1779 in the United States
- List of years in Delaware
