= 1780 in Delaware =

- Decades: 1760s; 1770s; 1780s; 1790s; 1800s
- See also: History of Delaware; Historical outline of Delaware; List of years in Delaware; 1780 in the United States

This is a list of events in 1780 in Delaware.

== Incumbents ==
- Governor: Caesar Rodney

== Events ==
- October 20 – The 5th Delaware General Assembly convenes succeeding the 4th.

== Births ==
- January 15 – Cornelius P. Comegys, farmer and politician, 31st governor (d. 1851)
- August 7 – Benjamin Ferris, watchmaker and historian (d. 1867)
- October 17 – Thomas Beale Dorsey, farmer, lawyer, politician and judge (d. 1855)
- December 24 – Willard Hall, attorney and politician (d. 1875)

=== Undated ===
- William Bayard Shields, judge, lawyer and politician (d. 1823)

== Deaths ==
- August 19 – Johann de Kalb, Franconian-born French military officer (b. 1721)

=== Undated ===
- Hugh Montgomery, sea captain (b. unknown)

== See also ==
- 1780 in the United States
- List of years in Delaware
