= 1777 in Delaware =

- Decades: 1760s; 1770s; 1780s; 1790s
- See also: History of Delaware; Historical outline of Delaware; List of years in Delaware; 1777 in the United States

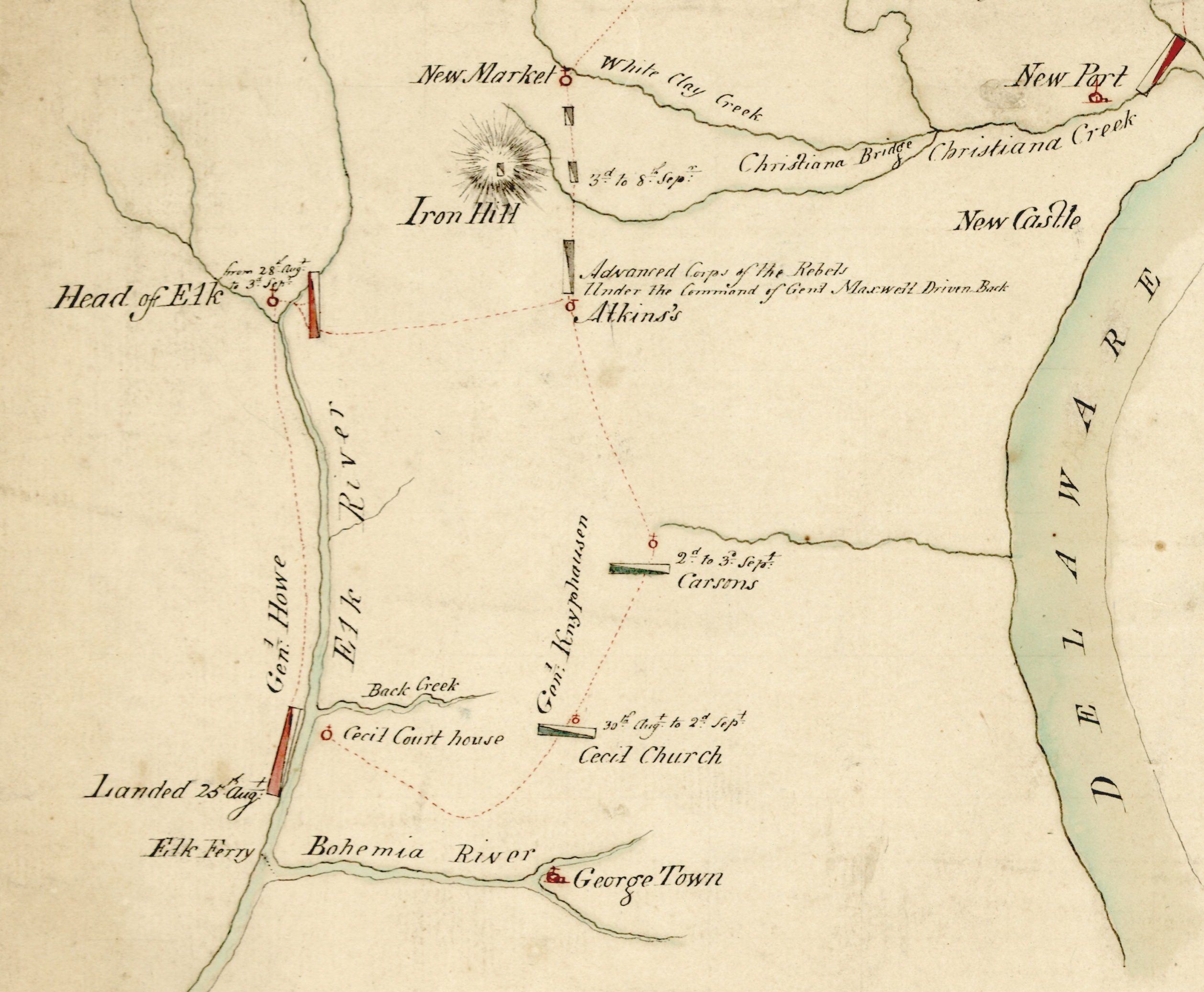
Detail of a period military map depicting the preliminary British movements in the 1777 Philadelphia campaign in Maryland and Delaware, including the site (near Iron Hill) of the Battle of Cooch's Bridge.

Events from the year 1777 in Delaware.

== Incumbents ==
- Governor: John McKinly (February 12 to September 22), Thomas McKean (September 22 to October 22), George Read (since October 22)

== Events ==
- February 12 – John McKinly is sworn as the first president (now governor).
- September 3 – American Revolutionary War: Battle of Cooch's Bridge – In a minor skirmish in New Castle County, Delaware, the flag of the United States was flown in battle for the first time.
- September 6 – George Washington held a council at Hale-Byrnes House in Stanton.
- September 22 – Thomas McKean is sworn as the second president succeeding John McKinly (now governor).
- October 20
  - George Read is sworn in as the third governor succeeding Thomas McKean.
  - The 2nd Delaware General Assembly convenes succeeding the 1st.

== Births ==
- March 5 – Outerbridge Horsey, lawyer and politician (d. 1842)
- October 10 – Hezekiah Niles, editor and publisher (d. 1839)
- December 21 – James P. Heath, politician (d. 1854)

=== Undated ===
- Thomas Clayton, lawyer and politician (d. 1854)

== Deaths ==
- January 3 – John Haslet, Presbyterian clergyman and soldier (b. c. 1727)

== See also ==
- 1777 in the United States
- History of Delaware
- List of years in Delaware
