= 1776 in Delaware =

- Decades: 1760s; 1770s; 1780s; 1790s
- See also: History of Delaware; Historical outline of Delaware; List of years in Delaware; 1776 in the United States

This is a list of events in the year 1776 in Delaware.

== Events ==
- June 15 – American Revolution: Delaware Separation Day: The Delaware General Assembly votes to suspend government under the British Crown.
- July 4 – American Revolution: The United States Declaration of Independence, in which the United States officially declares independence from the British Empire, is approved by the Continental Congress and signed by its president, John Hancock, together with representatives from Connecticut, Delaware, Georgia, Maryland, Massachusetts Bay, New Hampshire, New Jersey, New York, North Carolina, Pennsylvania, Rhode Island, South Carolina and Virginia.
- August 2 – American Revolution: A parchment copy of the Declaration of Independence is signed by 56 members of Congress (not all of whom had been present on July 4).
- September 20 – The Delaware Constitution of 1776 is adopted by the convention.
- October 20 – The 1st Delaware General Assembly convenes in New Castle which was considered the capitol.

== Births ==
- March 1 – John Collins, manufacturer and politician, 22nd Governor (d. 1822)
- May 31 – John E. Hamm, US Army colonel, doctor and politician, diplomat, industrialist, and Marshall of the State of Ohio (d. 1864 )

=== Undated ===
- James M. Broom, lawyer and politician (d. 1850)
- Jacob Eichholtz, painter (d. 1842)
- James Price, miller, businessman, banker, and railroad executive (d. 1840)
- William C. Frazer, lawyer and judge (d. 1838)
- Reuben James, boatswain's mate of the United States Navy (d. 1838)

== See also ==
- 1776 in the United States
- List of years in Delaware
