= 2026 in Delaware =

- Decades: 2000s; 2010s; 2020s
- See also: History of Delaware; Historical outline of Delaware; List of years in Delaware; 2026 in the United States

The following is a list of events of the year 2026 in Delaware.

== Incumbents ==
=== State government ===
- Governor: Matt Meyer (D)

== Events ==
- March 7 – The bodies of six American soldiers killed by Iranian strikes on an American base in Kuwait are returned to the United States at Dover Air Force Base.
- April 30 – Nordstrom closes permanently at Christiana Mall after 15 years.
- May 26 – A judge rules that Fenwick Island does not violate the state constitution by allowing corporations to vote in municipal elections.
- June 16 – Two Wilmington Hospital employees are shot, one fatally. A suspect, another employee of the hospital, is arrested.
- August 20 – A state of emergency is declared in Dover after a tornado forms.
- October 25 – A fire at Lulu Ross Elementary in Milford partially destroys the school.
- October 31 – One person is killed and 14 people injured in two unrelated shootings in Delaware. In Ellendale, a teenage girl is killed and eight people injured at an outdoor party. In Newark, six people are injured in a shooting near the University of Delaware campus.
- November 3:
  - 2026 Delaware House of Representatives election
  - 2026 Delaware Senate election
  - 2026 United States Senate election in Delaware: Chris Coons wins reelection, beating former State Senator Michael Katz.
  - 2026 United States House of Representatives election in Delaware: Sarah McBride wins reelection, beating Republican challenger Joseph Arminio.

== See also ==
- 2026 in the United States
