= Benjamin Ferris =

Benjamin Ferris may refer to:

- Benjamin Ferris (historian) (1780–1867), American watchmaker and historian
- Benjamin Ferris (physician) (1919–1996), American physician and epidemiologist
- Benjamin G. Ferris (1802–1891), secretary to the Territorial Government of Utah

== See also ==
- Ben Ferris, Australian filmmaker
