= 2024 in Delaware =

- Decades: 2000s; 2010s; 2020s
- See also: History of Delaware; Historical outline of Delaware; List of years in Delaware; 2024 in the United States

The following is a list of events of the year 2024 in Delaware.

== Incumbents ==
=== State government ===
- Governor: John Carney (D)

== Events ==
- April 8 – 99 Cents Only Stores files for bankruptcy in the state of Delaware, with the intention to liquidate.
- June 11 – Hunter Biden, son of President Joe Biden, is convicted in a federal court in Delaware on three felony counts of possession of a firearm while under the influence of narcotics.
- July 17 – President Joe Biden temporarily suspends his re-election campaign to recover at his home in Rehoboth Beach, after being diagnosed with COVID-19.
- November 14 – Rep. Lisa Blunt Rochester of the Democratic Party defeats Eric Hansen of the Republican Party to become Delaware's first black and female senator.

== See also ==
- 2024 in the United States
