= Rosetta Gaston =

Black historian and community advocate in Brooklyn

Rosetta Gaston (January 29, 1885 – February, 1981) was a Black historian and community advocate in Brownsville, Brooklyn. She organized the Brooklyn Branch of the Association for the Study of Afro-American Life and History.

== Early life ==
Rosetta Gaston was born in New York City. Her father was Andrew J. Gaston, a pastor at the Union American Methodist Episcopal Church in Yorkville, Manhattan. Her mother was Emma H. (Lane) Gaston. They came to New York from Raleigh, North Carolina in 1866. Her father and brothers died by the time she was a teenager and she left school to support her family.

== Organizing and professional work ==
Rosetta Gaston began teaching Sunday school when she was 12 years old. As a young person, she raised money to buy Christmas presents for children, organized a choir, and a young people's association. She volunteered with the YWCA for seven years.

She organized a Negro History study group, and after meeting Carter G. Woodson in 1943 she established a Brooklyn chapter of his Association for the Study of Afro-American Life and History in Brownsville.

Professionally, Ms. Gaston started out working at department stores such as Wannamaker's and Gimbels. She also worked at a private sanatorium before taking a job at Bergdorf-Goodman, where she worked from 1916 to 1956, where she was able to leverage her professional connections to raise money for her neighborhood-based Black studies work.

== Recognition ==
Rosetta Gaston was known as Mother Gaston for the maternal care she took with her students. In the 1980's a local chapter of the Afro-American History Association raised money to erect a statue in her honor at a center which also bears her name at 460 Dumont Ave. The monument, by local sculptor Bo Walker, was unveiled in 1986. Stone Avenue was renamed Mother Gaston Boulevard.
