= 2025 in Delaware =

- Decades: 2000s; 2010s; 2020s
- See also: History of Delaware; Historical outline of Delaware; List of years in Delaware; 2025 in the United States

The following is a list of events of the year 2025 in Delaware.

== Incumbents ==
=== State government ===
- Governor:
  - until 7 January: John Carney (D)
  - 7 January-21 January: Bethany Hall-Long (D)
  - starting 21 January: Matt Meyer (D)

== Events ==
- January 3 – Sarah McBride takes office as U.S. Representative for Delaware's at-large district, making her the first transgender member of congress.
- February 15 –
  - 2025 Delaware Senate District 1 special election
  - 2025 Delaware Senate District 5 special election
- August 1 – Recreational cannabis sales begin in Delaware.
- September 18 – Delaware joins nine other states in the Northeast Public Health Collaborative, a collaborative health agency among Northeastern states.
- December 23 – A gunman kills a Delaware State Trooper at a DMV office south of Wilmington. A responding police officer fatally shoots the gunman.

== See also ==
- 2025 in the United States
