= 2023 in Delaware =

- Decades: 2000s; 2010s; 2020s
- See also: History of Delaware; Historical outline of Delaware; List of years in Delaware; 2023 in the United States

The following is a list of events of the year 2023 in Delaware.

== Incumbents ==
=== State government ===
- Governor: John Carney (D)

== Events ==
- June 28 – Smoke from the Canadian Wildfires is reported in several U.S states including Delaware.
- August 11 – Weiss special counsel investigation: U.S. Attorney General Merrick Garland announces the appointment of Delaware attorney David Weiss as special counsel for the investigations into the financial dealings of presidential son Hunter Biden.
- December 22 – Delaware’s largest hospital system, ChristianaCare, will pay more than $47 million to settle whistleblower allegations by its former compliance officer that it provided kickbacks to outside doctors in return for patient referrals, resulting in fraudulent Medicaid billing.

== See also ==
- 2023 in the United States
