= Union American Methodist Episcopal Church =

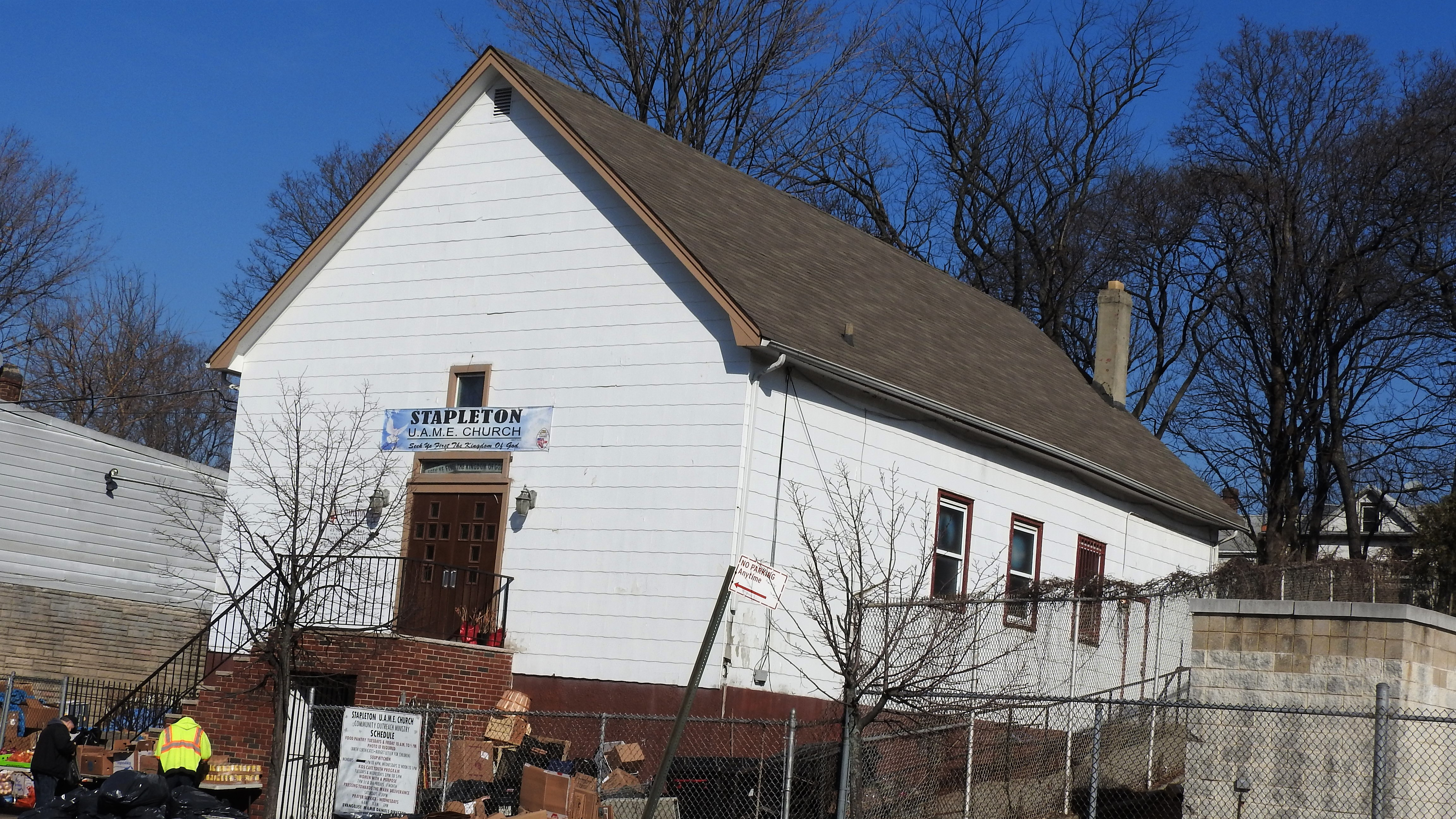
- Stapleton UAMEC is a local church belonging to the Union American Methodist Episcopal Church
- Classification: Methodism
- Orientation: Holiness movement
- Theology: Wesleyan
- Polity: Connexionalism
- Separated from: African Union Methodist Protestant Church (1865)
- Official website: uamechurch.org

The Union American Methodist Episcopal Church (UAMEC), which is abbreviated as the U.A.M.E. Church, is a Methodist denomination of Christianity.

The formation of the Union American Methodist Episcopal Church is a part of the history of Methodism in the United States; it was formally organized in 1865 by some congregations of the African Union Methodist Protestant Church founded by Peter Spencer in 1813.

In May 2012, The Union American Methodist Episcopal Church entered into full communion with the African Methodist Episcopal Church, African Methodist Episcopal Zion Church, African Union Methodist Protestant Church, Christian Methodist Episcopal Church, and the United Methodist Church, in which these Churches agreed to "recognize each other’s churches, share sacraments, and affirm their clergy and ministries."

The Union American Methodist Episcopal Church oversees Boulden Seminary, which grants the Bachelor of Theology degree.

== See also ==
- Spencer Churches
- List of African Methodist Episcopal Churches
