= Olivet Chapel =

United States historic place

- U.S. National Register of Historic Places
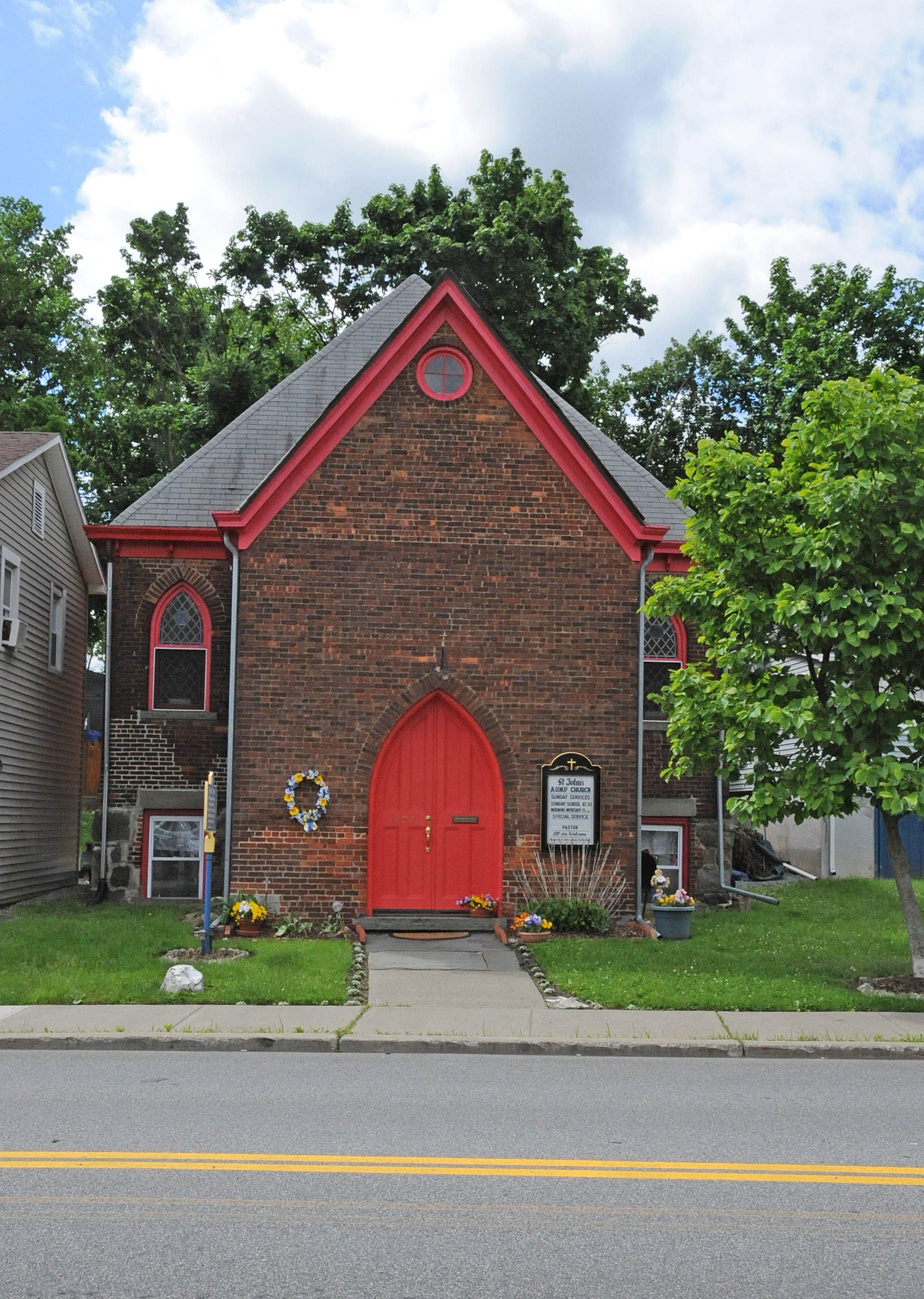

- Location within New York Location within the United States
- Location: 201 W. Main St., Goshen, New York
- Coordinates: 41°24′5.25″N 74°19′40.38″W
- Area: 0.9 acres (0.36 ha)
- Built: 1910
- NRHP reference No.: 10000336
- Added to NRHP: June 9, 2010

Olivet Chapel, since 1965 known as the A.U.M.P. affiliated St. John's African Union Methodist Protestant Church, is a historic Presbyterian African American mission chapel located in Goshen in Orange County, New York. It was built about 1910 and is a load-bearing masonry building with a bluestone foundation and topped by a high hipped roof. Horace Pippin (1888–1946) was a noted member of the church prior to its moving to Olivet Chapel.

It was listed on the National Register of Historic Places in 2010.
