= Hinsonville, Pennsylvania =

Former municipality in Chester County, Pennsylvania

Coordinates: 39.8062°N 75.9281°W

Hinsonville is a former municipality in Chester County, Pennsylvania which is now largely replaced by the grounds of Lincoln University. It was established and mostly populated by free African American residents, with the acres of Hinsonville being first purchased by Edward Walls, a free black man who was born in Maryland, in 1793. The town was named for its first permanent resident, Emory Hinson, another Maryland-born free black man. Located six miles north of the Mason–Dixon line and at the crossroads of Russellville-Elkdale Road and Oxford-Jennersville Road in the southern tip of Upper Oxford Township, the agricultural community of Hinsonville became an ideal residence for African Americans escaping slavery in neighboring Maryland from the 1820s to the 1850s. By 1843–1845, when the Hosanna Meeting House (also known as the Hosanna A.U.M.P. Church) was established in town, Hinsonville had expanded considerably due to the flight of free black families from the South.

In 1854, James Ralston Amos, a founding trustee of the town, asked Rev. John Miller Dickey, a Presbyterian minister, and his wife, Sarah Emlen Cresson, a Quaker, to start what became the Ashmun Institute in Hinsonville. They named it after Jehudi Ashmun, a religious leader and social reformer. They founded the school for the education of African Americans, who had few opportunities for higher education. The school was supported by local residents to educate the young men of Hosanna Church in Christian religion; the original intent of Amos, in particular, was to help train black men as missionaries to Liberia. The success of the Ashmun Institute led to its growth into the surrounding town, eventually being renamed Lincoln University in 1866 after Abraham Lincoln's death. Hosanna was used as a station on the Underground Railroad, and at least eighteen congregants served in the 54th Massachusetts Infantry Regiment, the first African American regiment in the Union Army. Many more Hinsonville residents joined other US Colored Troops (USCT) regiments.

One of the town's most famous residents was Richard B. Fitzgerald, who, as a child, was relocated by his parents with his family from Delaware to a 25-acre (100,000 m^{2}) farm near Hinsonville in order to reduce the risk to their children of being kidnapped by slave catchers and sold into slavery. Later, Fitzgerald would achieve prominence as a bricklayer and businessman.

As of 2017, the Hosanna A.U.M.P. Church is the only remaining architectural structure from Hinsonville. Descendants of Hinsonville's early residents still attend the church, as do some Lincoln students. In 2015, a memorial bench was placed near Hosanna in commemoration of the church by members of the Toni Morrison Society as part of their "Bench by the Road" program.
