= Deborah Ferris Bringhurst =

American philanthropist and needleworker

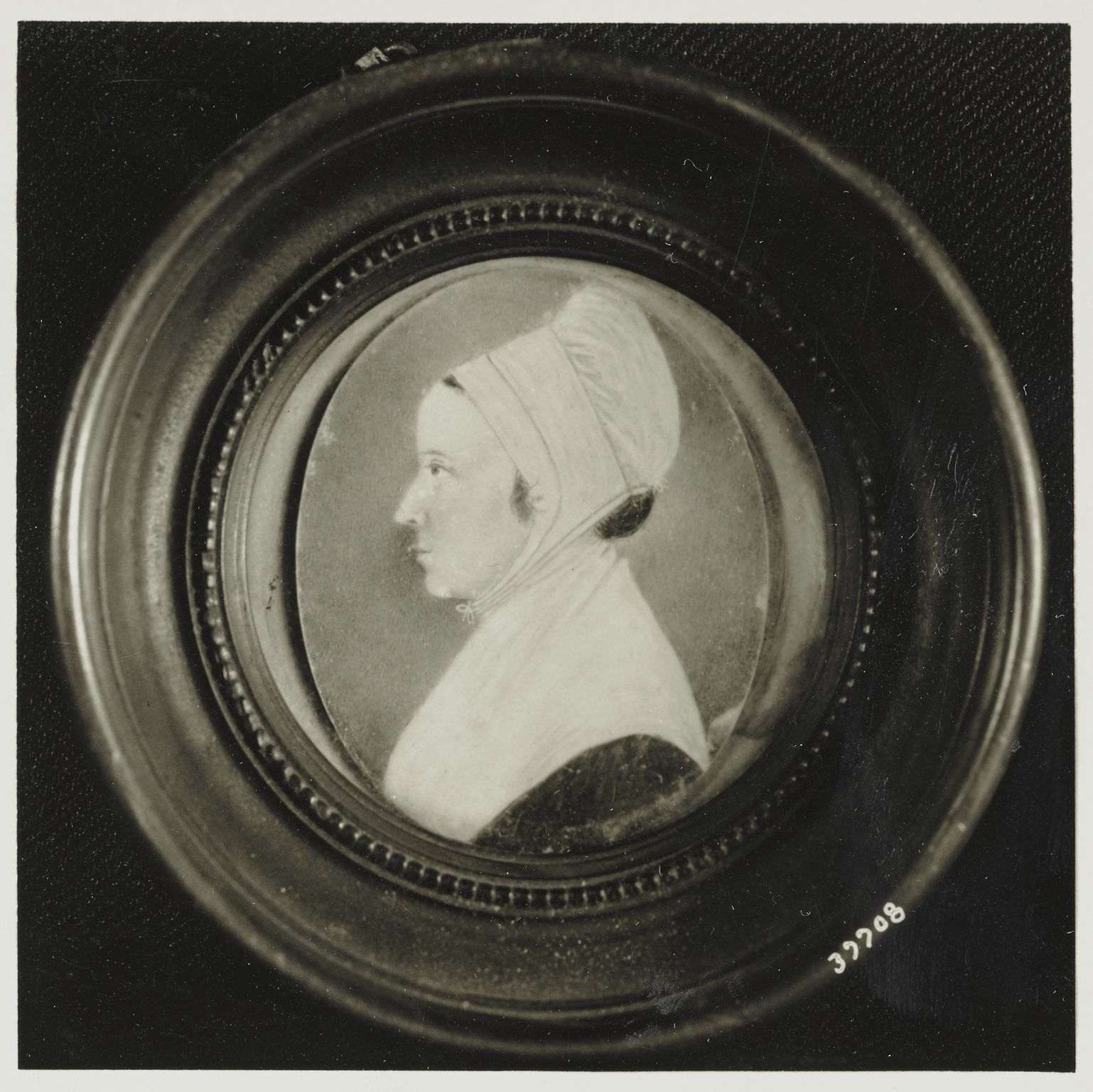
- Born: March 2, 1773; Wilmington, Delaware, US
- Died: August 20, 1844; Wilmington, Delaware, US
- Spouse: Joseph Bringhurst Sr.

Deborah Ferris Bringhurst (March 2, 1773 – August 20, 1844) was an American philanthropist and needleworker.

Deborah Ferris was born on March 2, 1773, in Wilmington, Delaware into a family of Quakers, the daughter of cabinetmaker Ziba Ferris and Edith Sharpless Ferris. Her siblings included silversmith Ziba Ferris and historian Benjamin Ferris.

In 1783, Ferris created a linen sampler, now in the Delaware Historical Society, that included Biblical quotations and the names of her siblings.

In the 1790s, she was courted by both novelist Charles Brockden Brown and physician Dr. Joseph Bringhurst. Both men engaged in a lengthy correspondence with Ferris. Brown addressed several poems to her, including "Devotion: An Epistle" which he later published. Ferris' and Bringhurst's letters to each other were signed "Laura" and "Petrarch", after the Italian Renaissance poet and the woman who was the subject of his love sonnets.

Ferris and Bringhurst married in 1799. They had five children: William Bringhurst (1800–1818), Mary Dickinson Bringhurst (1806–1886), Joseph Bringhurst (1807–1880), Edward Bringhurst (1809–1884), and Ziba Ferris Bringhurst (1812–1836).

In 1800, she was one of a group of Quaker women who founded the Female Benevolent Society of Wilmington, the first charity organization in the state of Delaware.

Bringhurst was a devout Hicksite Quaker and abolitionist, though she recorded in her diary in 1839 that "I listened to one of the most extraordinary sermons I ever heard" by the anti-abolitionist Quaker minister George Fox White.

Deborah Bringhurst died on 20 August 1844 in Wilmington.
