= Hosanna Meeting House =

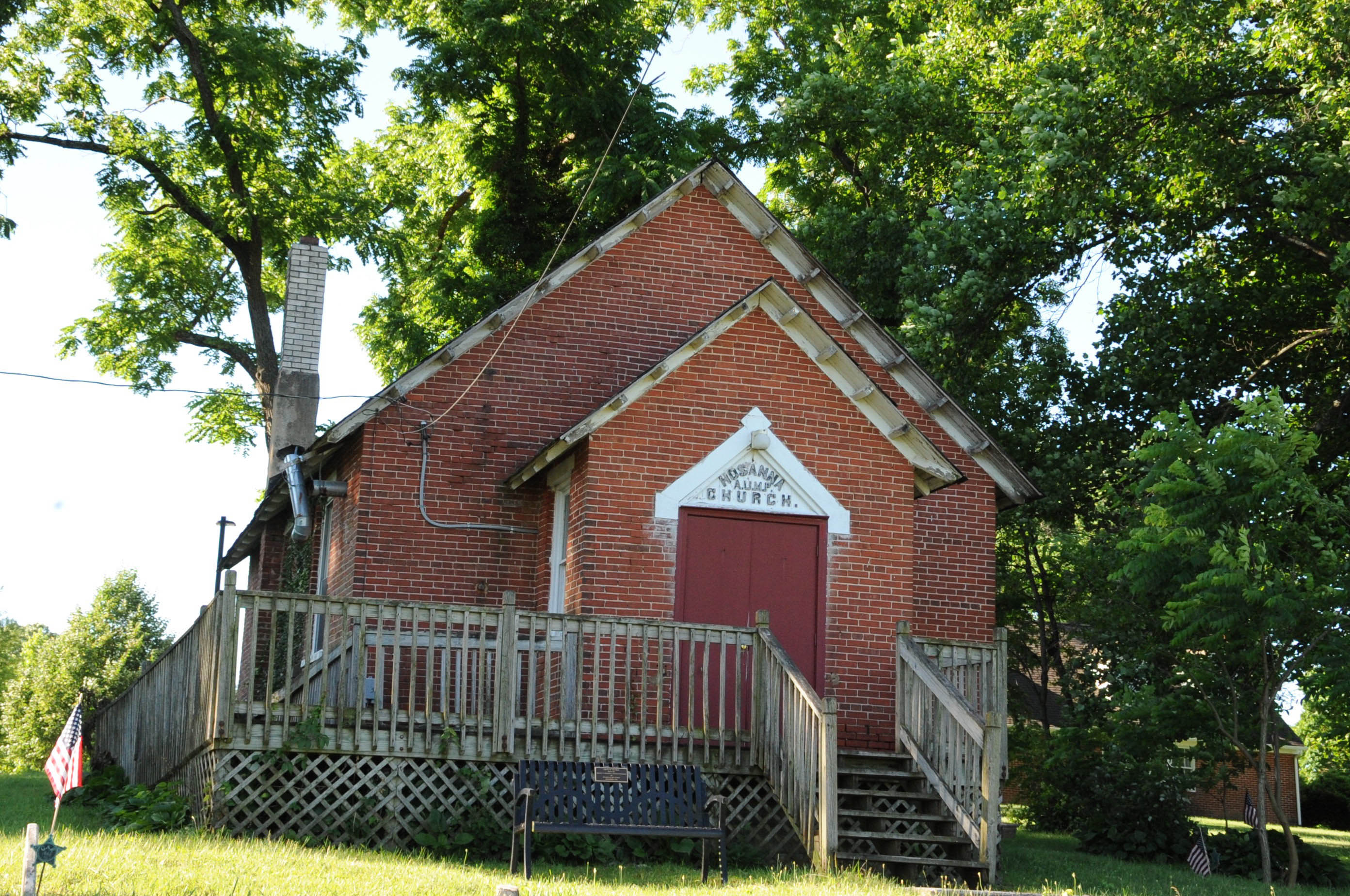
- Interactive map of the Hosanna Meeting House area
- Alternative names: Hosanna African Union Methodist Protestant Church
- Etymology: Biblical cry of praise

General information
- Type: Church
- Location: 531 University Road, Lincoln University, Pennsylvania 19352, United States
- Coordinates: 39.8112°N 75.9253°W
- Completed: 1845
- Owner: Lincoln University

Design and construction
- Known for: Historic African American church and station on the Underground Railroad

Hosanna Meeting House, also known as the Hosanna A.U.M.P. Church, is a historic African American church near Oxford, Pennsylvania, United States, on the present-day campus of Lincoln University. Organized in 1843 and constructed by 1845, the Hosanna Meeting House was a station on the Underground Railroad and a primary place of worship for members of the free Black community of Hinsonville. A Pennsylvania state historical marker was placed at the church in 1992. The church and cemetery were listed on the National Register of Historic Places on March 25, 2024.

== Architecture ==
The church is a small, one-room, one-story chapel constructed of red brick with a plain exterior, a shingled gable roof, and wooden front steps up to a wraparound porch. A crawlspace beneath the floorboards once served as a hiding place for fugitive slaves. A small historic cemetery adjacent to the church was established in 1854 as one of Chester County's first marked grave sites for Black decedents. Along with other former congregants and veterans of various wars, seventeen African American veterans of the 54th Massachusetts Infantry Regiment are buried in the cemetery.

== History ==
Organized in 1843 and built by 1845, Hosanna is the only surviving structure from the village of Hinsonville, a free Black community predating the Civil War. Affiliated with the A.U.M.P. Church, Hosanna was a station on the Underground Railroad and hosted Frederick Douglass, Harriet Tubman, Sojourner Truth, and other visitors.

In recognition of Hosanna's significance to the free Black community, the Pennsylvania Historical and Museum Commission placed a marker by Old U.S. Route 1 where the road passes the church, dedicating the marker on May 9, 1992. Church and cemetery were listed on the National Register of Historic Places on March 25, 2024.

As of 2015, Hosanna's congregation consisted of fewer than twenty people. The church has remained a place of worship for Lincoln University's students and staff.

== See also ==
- List of Pennsylvania state historical markers in Chester County
