= Domino Players =

1943 painting by Horace Pippin

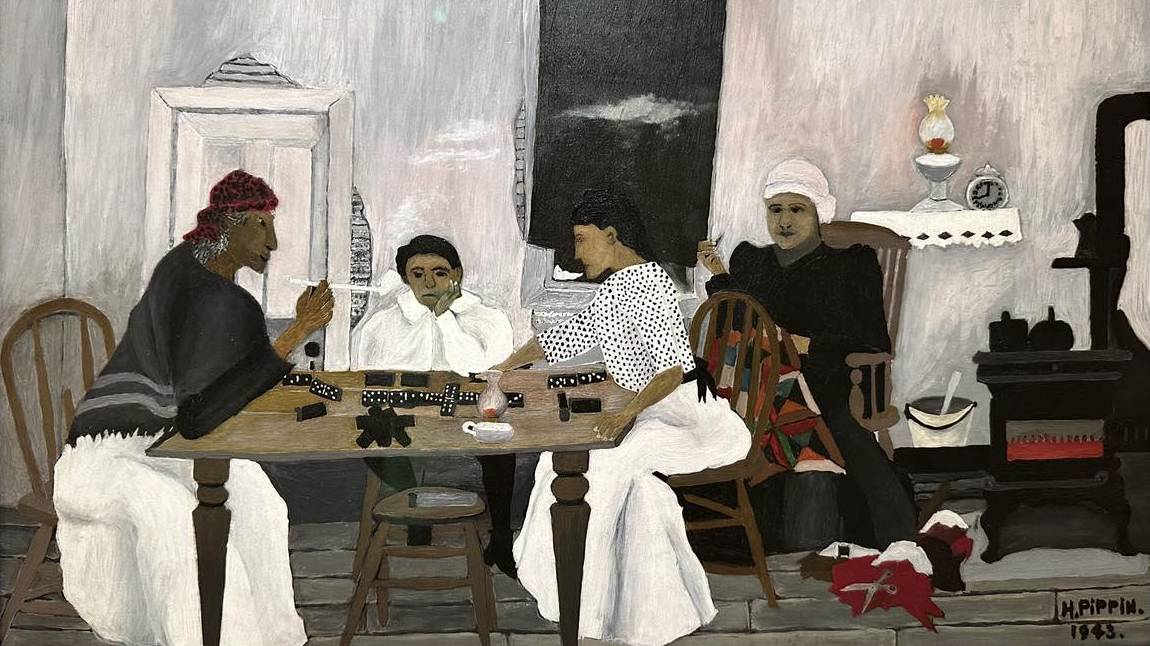
- Artist: Horace Pippin
- Year: 1943
- Location: The Phillips Collection; Washington, D.C.
- Accession: 1943

Domino Players is a 1943 painting by American painter Horace Pippin. The painting depicts a domestic scene, in which three individuals are playing dominoes while another looks on. The piece is held by The Phillips Collection. The New York Times praised the piece for "[bringing] a seldom-recorded existence vividly to life."
