= Delaware Shakespeare Festival =

Outdoor Shakespeare festival in Wilmington, Delaware

Delaware Shakespeare (formerly known as "Delaware Shakespeare Festival") is an outdoor Shakespeare festival that takes place during the summer months at Rockwood Park located in the city of Wilmington, Delaware. The mission of the Delaware Shakespeare is to create professional theatre and educational programs in order to further the understanding and appreciation of Shakespeare's works for the residents and friends of the State of Delaware.

== Production history ==
Summer Festival at Archmere Academy

- 2003: A Midsummer Night's Dream
- 2004: As You Like It
- 2005: Love's Labour's Lost

Summer Festival at Rockwood Park:

- 2006: Much Ado About Nothing
- 2007: Richard III
- 2008: Romeo and Juliet
- 2009: Twelfth Night
- 2010: Macbeth
- 2011: The Winter's Tale
- 2012: A Midsummer Night's Dream
- 2013: The Two Gentlemen of Verona
- 2014: Hamlet
- 2015: The Taming of the Shrew
- 2016: The Comedy of Errors
- 2017: Henry V
- 2018: Much Ado About Nothing

Community Tour

- 2016: Pericles, Prince of Tyre
- 2017: As You Like It
- 2018: The Merchant of Venice

== Education and outreach ==
=== Shakespeare, Then, Now and Always ===
Originally piloted in 2004, the Shakespeare, Then, Now and Always program is an interactive seminar for local high school students. One of the Festival's Shakespearean scholars visits local high school classrooms to work with students on reading, speaking and understanding the works of the Bard.

=== The Bridge to Shakespeare’s Masterpiece ===
Following the performance, a panel of DSF scholars and actors meet with the participants to review the themes of the play, discuss the world of Shakespeare and find connections to the modern world and to their own lives.

== History ==
The Delaware Shakespeare Festival was founded in 2003 by Molly Cahill and Greg Robleto and performed for three years on the grounds of or in the auditorium at Archmere Academy in Claymont. In 2006, the Festival moving to its current outdoor only location in Rockwood Park in Wilmington. In 2011, the Festival began taking productions on tour to other destinations in Delaware, starting with a free showing of the play at The Freeman Stage at Bayside in Fenwick Island.
