= Horace Pippin =

American painter (1888–1946)

- Born: February 22, 1888; West Chester, Pennsylvania, U.S.
- Died: July 6, 1946 (aged 58)
- Resting place: Chestnut Grove Cemetery Annex, West Chester, Pennsylvania, U.S.
- Known for: Painting
- Spouse: Jennie Ora Fetherstone Wade Giles
- Mother: Harriet Johnson Irwin Pippin

Horace Pippin (February 22, 1888 – July 6, 1946) was an American painter who painted a range of themes, including scenes inspired by his service in World War I, landscapes, portraits, and biblical subjects. Some of his best-known works address the U.S.'s history of slavery and racial segregation. He was the first Black artist to be the subject of a monograph, Selden Rodman's Horace Pippin, A Negro Painter in America (1947), and The New York Times eulogized him as "the most important Negro painter" in American history. He is buried at Chestnut Grove Cemetery Annex in West Goshen Township, Pennsylvania. A Pennsylvania State historical Marker at 327 Gay Street, West Chester, Pennsylvania, identifies his home at the time of his death and commemorates his accomplishments.

== Early life ==
Pippin was born in West Chester, Pennsylvania, on February 22, 1888. His mother was Harriet Johnson Pippin, and there are conflicting reports about the identify of his father, none of which can be substantiated. He grew up in and around Goshen, New York, and attended church at St. John's African Union Methodist Protestant Church.

As a child, Pippin responded to an art supply company's advertising contest and won his first set of crayons and a box of watercolors. He apparently liked to draw the racehorses and jockeys from Goshen's celebrated trotter (horse) racetrack.

He attended a segregated school, which he quit early to support his ailing mother. He worked in a coal yard in Goshen, as a hotel porter at the St. Elmo Hotel in Goshen, as a mover at a storage warehouse in Paterson, New Jersey, and as an iron moulder in Mahwah, New Jersey before enlisting in World War 1.

== World War I ==
In World War I, Pippin served in K Company, the 3rd Battalion of the 369th infantry regiment, known for their bravery in battle as the famous Harlem Hellfighters. At least partly because of US racism, the all-Black unit was transferred to the command of the French Army. They were the longest serving U.S. regiment on the war's frontlines, holding their ground against enemy fire almost continuously from early April until the end of the war. The regiment as a whole was awarded the French Croix de Guerre.

In September 1918, Pippin was shot by a German sniper, probably during the capture of Séchault, which was part of the Meuse-Argonne Offensive. As he later explained:

"I have three wounds, two flesh wounds and one in the right shoulder and arm, splitting my shoulder blade in two places, and wrecking the socket of the right arm."

The injury cost him the use of his arm and earned him a disability pension for life. While he eventually recovered much of his arm's function, he remained unable "to lift my right hand above my head without the aid of my left hand." (Presumably, mischaracterizations of that quote and a photo shoot from December 1940, illustrated above, are the sources of the erroneous, widespread idea that he had to move his right hand with his left to paint.)

He was honorably discharged in 1919. He was retroactively awarded a Purple Heart for his combat injury in 1945. He said of his combat experience:

I did not care what or where I went. I asked God to help me, and he did so. And that is the way I came through that terrible and Hellish place. For the whole entire battlefield was hell, so it was no place for any human being to be.

After the war, Pippin created four memoirs—one illustrated—that describe his harrowing military service in detail. He returned to war subjects periodically throughout the 1930s and 1940s, and later said that WWI "brought out all the art in me".

Horace Pippin's War Notebooks, ca. 1920

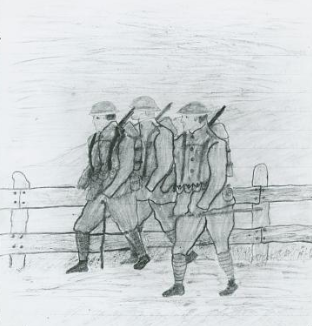
Three Soldiers on March

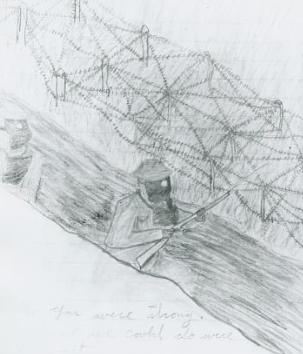
Soldiers with Gas Masks in Trench

== Postwar life and art career ==
Immediately after the war, Pippin moved to Bellville, New Jersey with his brother and worked as a truck driver. The following year, 1920, he married Jennie Fetherstone Wade Giles, who had been widowed twice and had a six-year-old-son, Richard Wade. Pippin moved to his wife's home in West Chester, Pennsylvania, where city directories from the mid-1920s list him as a laborer. The 1930 census lists him as a junk dealer, and he also reportedly made deliveries for his wife's laundry business.

Pippin took up art in the mid-1920s by burning designs—mostly snow scenes—into wood panels with a hot poker and adding paint in one or two colors to highlight specific components of the image.

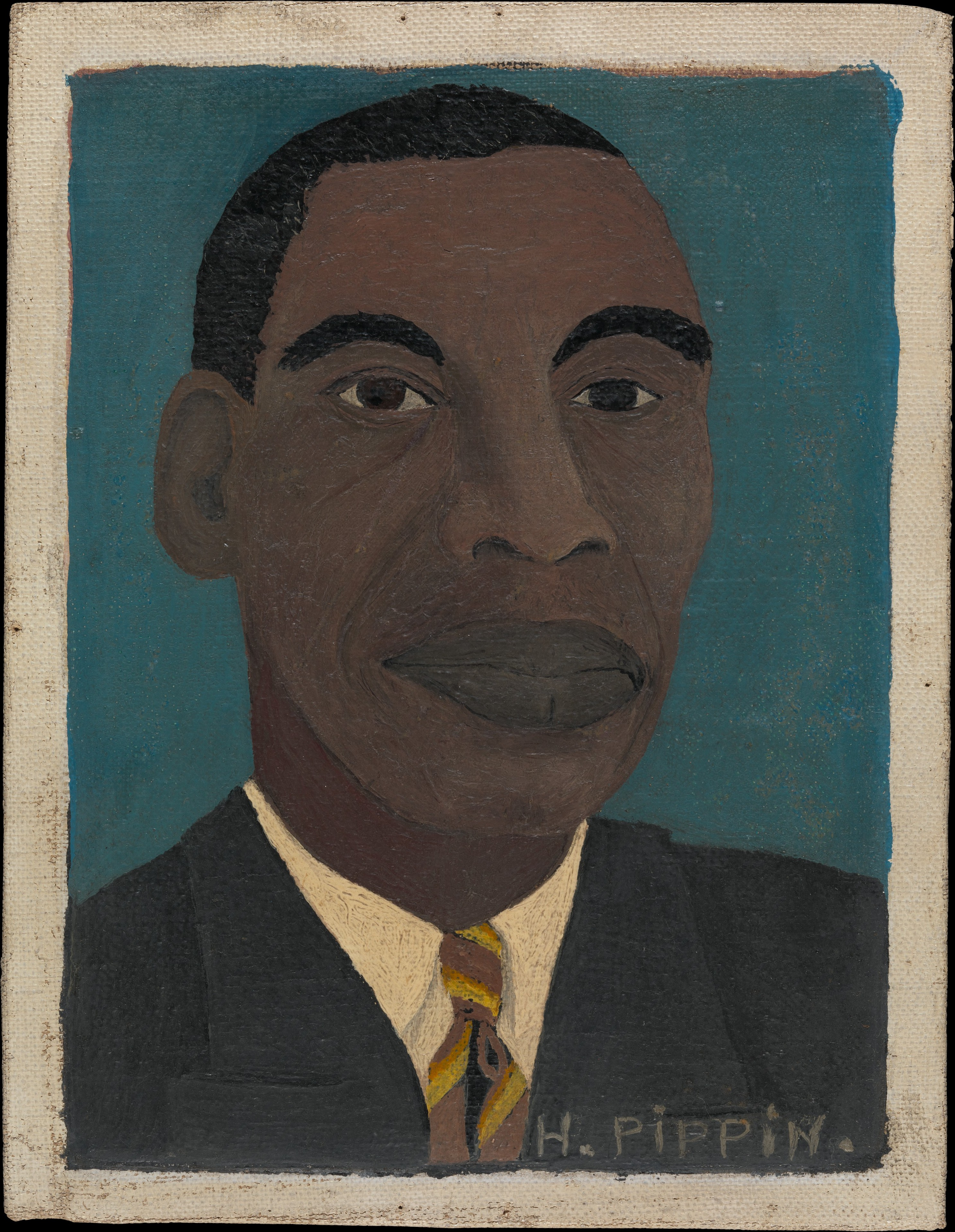
Self-Portrait II, 1944, at The Metropolitan Museum of Art

He began painting on stretched fabric in 1930 with The Ending of the War: Starting Home. He later explained his creative process: "The pictures which I have already painted come to me in my mind, and if to me it is a worth while picture, I paint it." In fact, he revised several compositions extensively. He addressed a range of themes, from landscapes and still lifes to biblical subjects and political statements. Some draw on his personal experience of the war or turn-of-the-century domestic life.

He was "discovered" when he submitted two paintings to a local art show—the Chester County Art Association (CCAA) Annual Exhibition—reportedly with the aid and encouragement of various locals, including CCAA co-founders art critic Christian Brinton and artist N.C. Wyeth. Brinton immediately organized Pippin's first solo exhibition, cosponsored by the CCAA and the interracial West Chester Community Center, and then connected him with MoMA curators Dorothy Miller and Holger Cahill and, by 1940, the Philadelphia art dealer Robert Carlen and collector Albert C. Barnes. Pippin briefly attended art appreciation classes at the Barnes Foundation in the spring 1940 semester. Carlen, Barnes, and, starting in 1941, dealer Edith Gregor Halpert played prominent roles in Pippin's career.

In the eight years between his national debut in the Museum of Modern Art's traveling exhibition "Masters of Popular Painting" (1938) and his death at the age of fifty-eight, Pippin's recognition grew exponentially across the country and internationally. During this period, he had solo exhibitions in commercial galleries in Philadelphia (1940, 1941) and New York (1940, 1944), and at the Arts Club of Chicago (1941) and San Francisco Museum of Modern Art (1942). Private collections and institutions such as the Barnes Foundation, the Philadelphia Museum of Art and the Whitney Museum of American Art acquired his works. His paintings were featured in annual or biennials at the Art Institute of Chicago, Chicago, Illinois; Carnegie Institute, Pittsburgh, Pennsylvania; Corcoran Gallery of Art, Washington, D.C.; Pennsylvania Academy of the Fine Arts, Philadelphia, PA; and the Whitney Museum of American Art, New York, as well as thematic surveys at the Dayton Art Institute, Ohio; National Gallery of Art, Washington, D.C.; Newark Museum, Newark, New Jersey; and Tate Gallery, London, UK.

In the catalogue for one of his memorial exhibitions in 1947, critic Alain Locke described Pippin as "a real and rare genius, combining folk quality with artistic maturity so uniquely as almost to defy classification."

== Artworks ==
Pippin's oeuvre includes a variety of subjects and compositional strategies.

His first oil painting, The Ending of the War, Starting Home (1930–1933), depicts a scene informed by his experience at the Battle of Sechault, where he was shot. (It does not depict the official German surrender on November 11, 1918, which happened as he was recovering in a French hospital.) He also made the frame and decorated it with hand-carved war materiel, including German and French helmets and weapons. He painted World War I several times thereafter in the 1930s and once more in 1945.

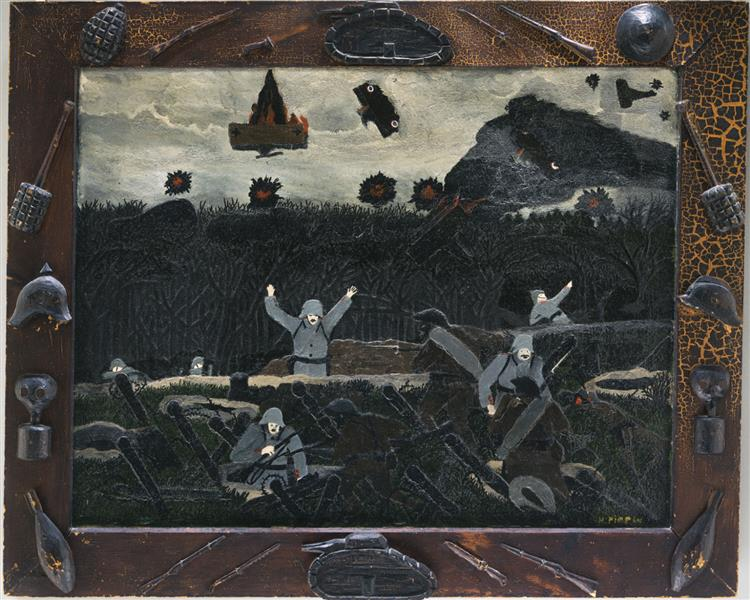
Horace Pippin, The Ending of the War, Starting Home, 1930–1933. Philadelphia Museum of Art

Pippin painted several religious subjects, which align with his roles as a Sunday school teacher and member of a church choir in West Chester. Many, including his celebrated Holy Mountain series, depict Bible verses. The three paintings of his Holy Mountain series are reminiscent of the bucolic Peaceable Kingdom paintings of Quaker artist Edward Hicks that depict predators and prey together. He includes in the backgrounds elements from his own time—soldiers, graveyards, war planes, and bombs—that are at odds with the peace depicted in the foreground. In The Knowledge of God and The Holy Mountain III, the tiny brown figure hanging in the trees refers to the ongoing scourge of lynching in the racially segregated southern United States. He inscribes on each a date significant from WWII. The Holy Mountain I is marked with "June 6, 1944", the date of the Allied landings at Normandy, known as of D-Day. The Knowledge of God is marked "Dec. 7 1944", the third anniversary of the attack on Pearl Harbor. Lastly, The Holy Mountain III is marked "Aug 9, 1945", the day the United States dropped an atomic bomb on Nagasaki, Japan. Some have argued that centrally placed shepherd figure resembles the artist. As he did with other aspects of Pippin's career, his dealer Robert Carlen took credit for exposing the artist to Hicks' series as he was a principal advocate for both autodidacts.

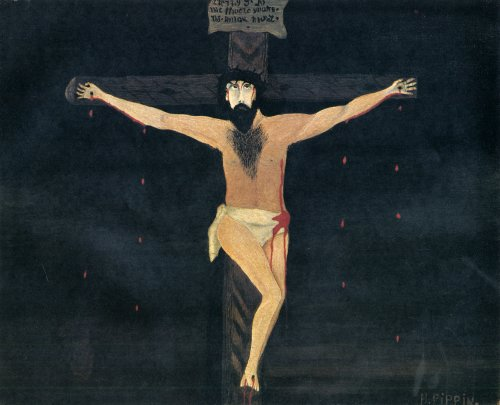
Horace Pippin, Crucifixion, 1943. Menil Collection.

Pippin painted two self portraits, including one seated at the easel. His painting of John Brown Going to his Hanging (1942) is in the collection of the Pennsylvania Academy of the Fine Arts in Philadelphia is part of a trilogy on the abolitionist sometimes credited with igniting the Civil War.

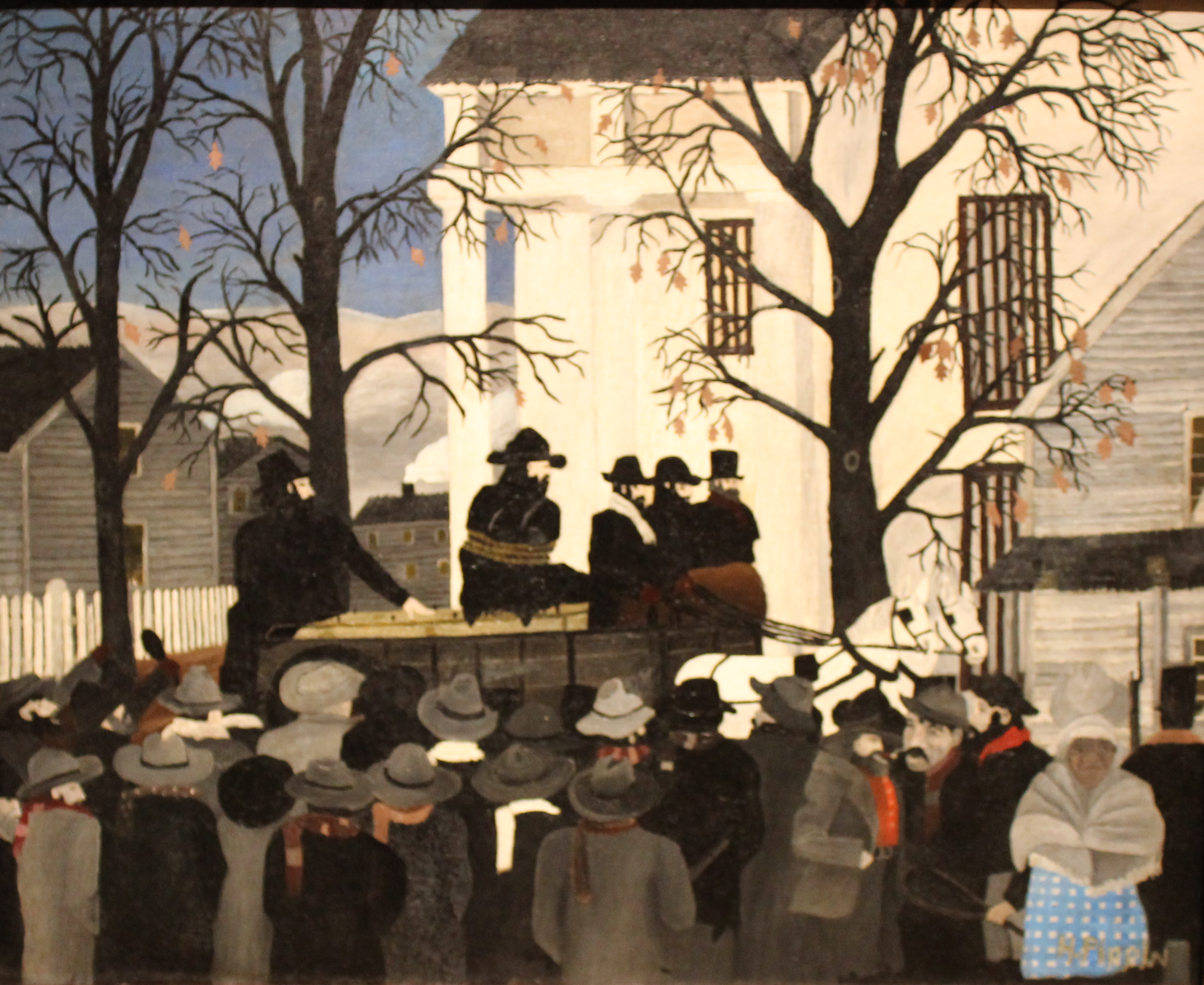
Horace Pippin, John Brown Going to His Hanging

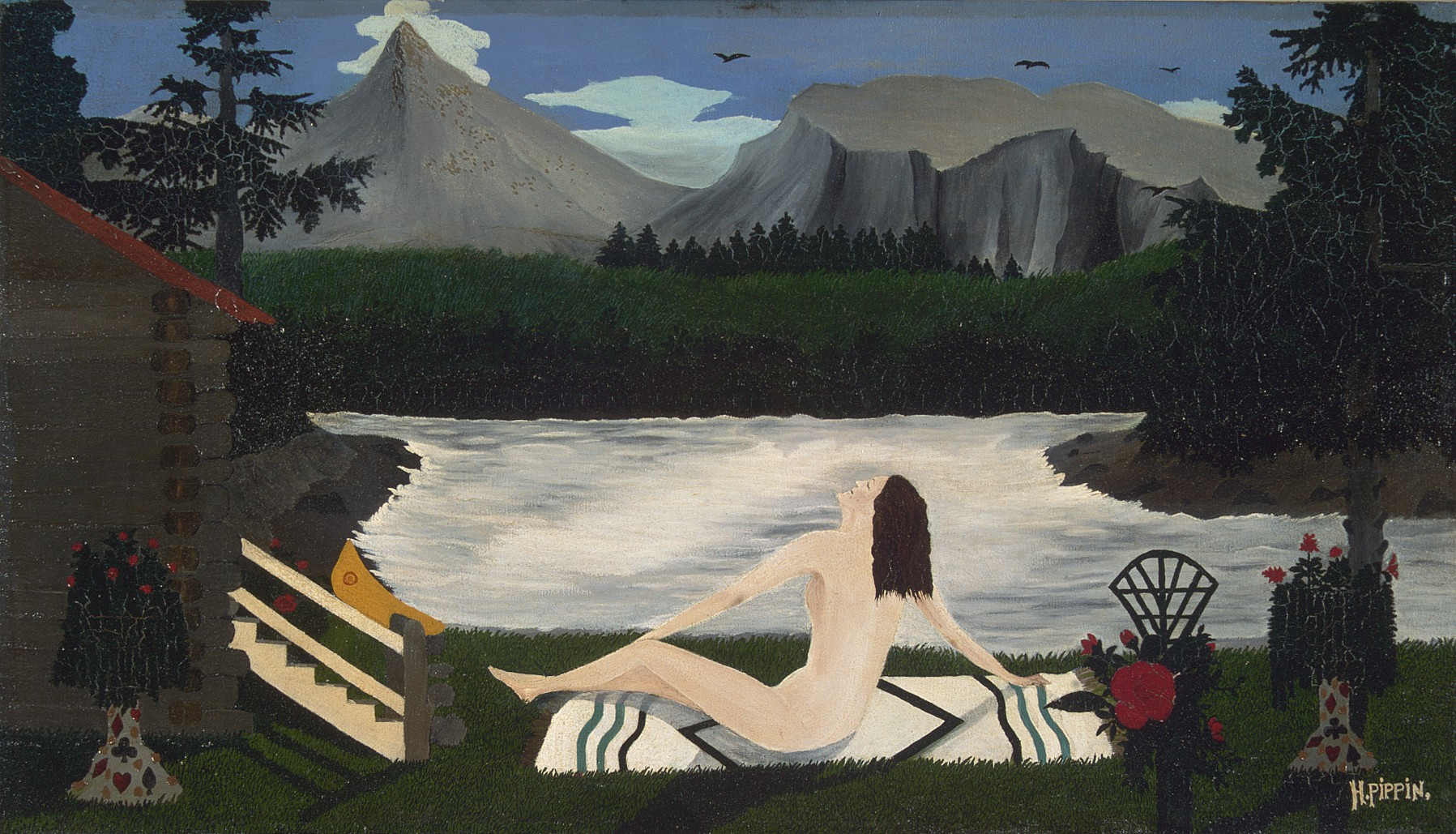
Lady of the Lake, 1936, Oil on fabric

As discussed in the catalogue essay for the exhibition Horace Pippin: Racism and War, Pippin made the painting Mr. Prejudice in the midst of World War II at the request of an unidentified patron, probably for use as a poster or illustration. Inspired by the Allies' "V for Victory" slogan, the painting is unique in his oeuvre for its experimental composition and symbolic program. The relatively small image—about the size of a magazine cover—sorts the figures by race and scale around the central motif of a giant V that matches the typography used in support of the US war effort. That Pippin does not use the distinctive logo of Black Americans' "Double V" campaign, which advocated for military victory abroad and victory over racism at home, suggests he was aiming to speak to a national—that is, majority White—audience. The upper register is dominated by oversize figures representing symbols or concepts. At center, a White man with a sledgehammer—presumably, Mr. Prejudice himself—drives a wedge into the V. At left, a large, copper-colored Statue of Liberty raises her torch to light the way to freedom. Staring at her from the right is a broad, lighter-skinned figure dressed in red and holding a noose, while a hooded Klansman looms above him. The lower register is filled with smaller scale figures that are segregated by race, reflecting the contemporaneous situation in the military and, to a lesser degree, the war industries. On the left are Black uniformed military, a medic, and a machinist, most of whom face the viewer. Some have read the brown-skinned figure at center left, outfitted in an anachronistic WWI uniform, as a self-portrait. A similar group of White men fill the lower right quadrant, most turned to face their Black counterparts.

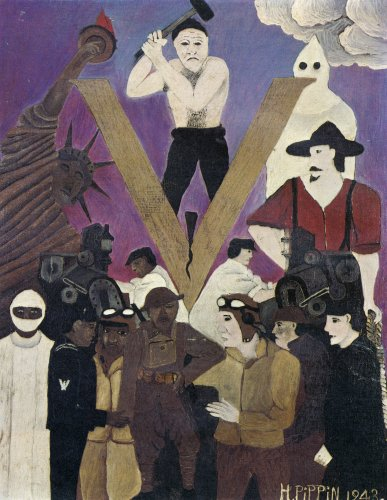
Mr. Prejudice painted by Horace Pippin in 1943

Pippin's genre paintings are among his most popular works; see, for example, the Domino Players (1943), in The Phillips Collection, Washington, D.C., and several versions of Cabin in the Cotton. Some, including After Supper (c. 1935–1939) and The Milkman of Goshen (1945), relate to his childhood in New York State. Views of the everyday activities of Black families "tended to be relatively invisible to the white masses" before the Great Migration, so Pippin's domestic scenes offered a privileged view.

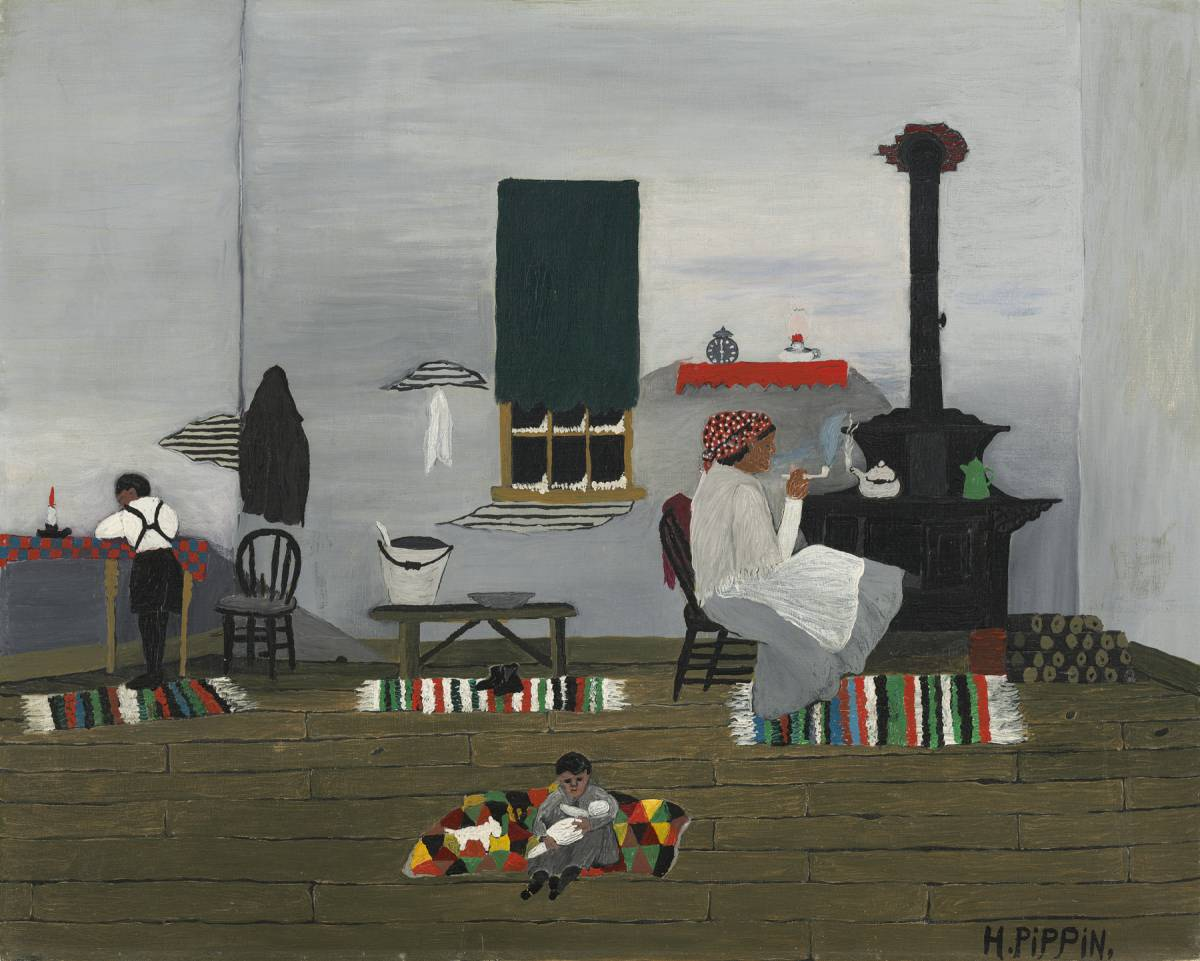
School Studies, 1944, oil on canvas

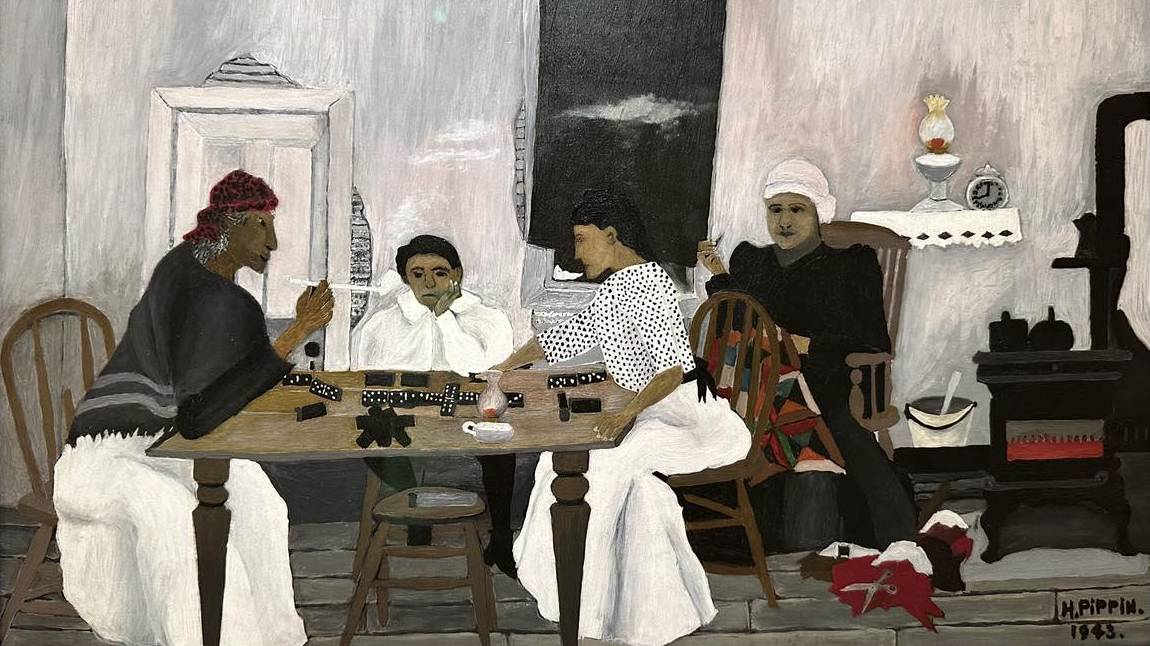
Domino Players (1943), The Phillips Collection

Pippin also created images related to popular culture, including Old Black Joe, based on the song "Old Black Joe"; Uncle Tom, based on the novel Uncle Tom's Cabin and its many adaptations, and maybe the musical and film Cabin in the Sky. He made two portraits of the celebrated Black contralto Marian Anderson, not long after her famous 1939 concert on the steps of the Lincoln Memorial, and dedicated a painting to Paul Robeson.

Pippin left The Park Bench unfinished in his studio at this death on July 6, 1946. Romare Bearden later said: "the man, I think, symbolizes Pippin himself, who, having completed his journey and his mission, sits wistfully, in the autumn of the year, all alone on a park bench."

== Collections ==
External videos
- Barnes Takeout: Art Talk on Horace Pippin's Supper Time, 12:17, Barnes Foundation
- Horace Pippin's Mr. Prejudice, 5:32, Smarthistory

Pippin painted about 140 works, many held in museum collections, including the Metropolitan Museum of Art, New York, NY; Hirshhorn Museum and Sculpture Garden, Washington, D.C.; Pennsylvania Academy of the Fine Arts, Philadelphia, PA; Philadelphia Museum of Art, Philadelphia, PA; The Barnes Foundation, Philadelphia, PA; the Brandywine Museum of Art, Chadds Ford, Pennsylvania; the Phillips Collection, Washington, D.C.; Baltimore Museum of Art, Baltimore, MD; and San Francisco Museum of Modern Art, San Francisco, CA.

== Exhibitions ==
Pippin was the first Black American artist to be the subject of a monograph, Selden Rodman's Horace Pippin: A Negro Painter in America of 1947. He has since been the subject of major retrospective exhibitions, several scholarly books and articles, a book of poetry, and several children's books.

- Horace Pippin. Phillips Collection, Washington, D.C., February 25–March 1977; Terry Dintenfass Gallery, New York, April 5–30, 1977; and Brandywine River Museum of Art, Chadds Ford, Pa., June 4–September 5, 1977.
- I Tell My Heart: The Art of Horace Pippin. Pennsylvania Academy of the Fine Arts, Philadelphia, January 21–April 17, 1994; Art Institute of Chicago, April 30–July 10, 1994; Cincinnati Art Museum, July 28–October 9, 1994; Baltimore Museum of Art, October 26, 1994 – January 1, 1995; and the Metropolitan Museum of Art, February 1–April 30, 1995.
- African-American Artists, 1929–1945: Prints, Drawings, and Paintings in The Metropolitan Museum of Art, the Metropolitan Museum of Art, New York, January 15–July 6, 2003 (included works by Pippen)
- Horace Pippin: The Way I See It. Brandywine River Museum of Art, Chadds Ford, Pa., April 25–July 19, 2015
- Horace Pippin: From War to Peace, Philadelphia Museum of Art, July 19, 2019 – June 21, 2021.

== Notes ==
=== Sources ===
- Barnes, Albert. "Horace Pippin." In Horace Pippin Exhibition, exh. cat., Carlen Gallery. Philadelphia, 1940.
- Bearden, Romare. "Horace Pippin." In Horace Pippin, exh. cat., The Phillips Collection. Washington, D.C., 1976.
- Bernier, Celeste-Marie. Suffering and Sunset: World War I in the Art and Life of Horace Pippin. Philadelphia: Temple University Press, 2015.
- Conn, Steve. "The Politics of Painting: Horace Pippin the Historian", American Studies (Spring 1997): pp. 5–26
- Forgey, Benjamin, "Horace Pippin's 'personal spiritual journey'", ARTnews 76 (Summer 1977): pp. 74–75
- Lewis, Audrey M. Horace Pippin: The Way I See It, exh. cat. Brandywine River Museum of Art, Chadds Ford, Pa., 2015
- Locke, Alain. "Horace Pippin." In Horace Pippin Memorial Exhibition, exh. cat. The Art Alliance, April 8–May 4, 1947. Philadelphia, 1947.
- Monahan, Anne. Horace Pippin, American Modern. New Haven: Yale University Press, 2020.
- Monahan, Anne. Horace Pippin: Racism and War, exh. cat. The Trout Gallery (Dickinson College), Carlisle, Pa., 2021.
- Monahan, Anne. "Horace Pippin's Self-Portraits," Yale University Press Blog, 22 February 2020.
- Monahan, Anne, Isabelle Duvernois, and Sylvia A. Centeno. "'Working My Thought More Perfecty': Horace Pippin's The Lady of the Lake," Metropolitan Museum Journal, v. 52 (2017).
- "Pippin, Horace." Grolier Encyclopedia of Knowledge, vol. 15. Grolier, 1991, ISBN 0-7172-5300-7
- Rodman, Selden. Horace Pippin: A Negro Painter in America. New York: Quadrangle, 1947.
- Stein, Judith E. et al. I Tell My Heart: The Art of Horace Pippin, ex. cat. Philadelphia: Pennsylvania Academy of the Fine Arts, 1993. For the full text of Stein's essay, "An American Original," see her website "judithstein.com". January 1993.
- Zilczer, Judith. "A Not-So-Peaceable Kingdom: Horace Pippin's Holy Mountain," Archives of American Art Journal, 41 (Jan 2001): 18–33, https://doi.org/10.1086/aaa.41.1_4.1557755
