= John Wiltbank =

American political figure (1731–1792)

Member of the Delaware Legislative Council from Sussex County
- In office October 20, 1776 – March 8, 1777
- Preceded by: Office established
- Succeeded by: John Jones

Justice of the peace for Sussex County
- In office March 20, 1767 – January 27, 1791

Member of the Provincial Assembly of the Three Lower Counties from Sussex
- In office August 1, 1774 – 1776

Chief justice of the Sussex County Court of Common Pleas and Orphans' Court
- In office March 8, 1777 – July 10, 1792

Military treasurer of Sussex County
- In office August 1776 – c. 1783

Member of the Sussex Committee of Safety
- In office c. 1775 – Unknown

Personal details
- Born: December 10, 1731 Lewes, Delaware
- Died: July 10, 1792 (aged 60) near Lewes, Delaware
- Spouse: Mary Stockley (m. 1750)
- Profession: Political figure

John Wiltbank (December 10, 1731 – July 10, 1792) was an American political figure from Lewes, Delaware. He was an important figure in the state during the Revolutionary War, being the military treasurer of Sussex County, a delegate at the Delaware Constitutional Convention, and serving in the 1st Delaware General Assembly, among other positions.

== Early life ==
Wiltbank was born on December 10, 1731, in Lewes, Delaware. He was born on a 344-acre farm that had been given to his great-grandfather, and was the son of Cornelius Wiltbank. He grew up and was educated in Lewes. On March 12, 1750 or 1751, he married Mary Stockley, the daughter of Woodman Stockley, on her 14th birthday. They had a total of six children together, the first of which was born in 1751.

== Career ==
On March 20, 1767, Wiltbank was appointed a justice of the peace for Sussex County. He was recommissioned in 1774 for a second term, for a third term in 1779, and for a fourth term in February 1788, eventually being replaced on January 27, 1791.

In 1774, Wiltbank was named a Sussex representative of the Provincial Assembly of the Three Lower Counties, (Note: Although Delaware was part of the Province of Pennsylvania at the time, it had a separate legislature known as the Provincial Assembly of the Three Lower Counties.) which had its first meeting on August 1 of that year. Originally a Tory sympathizer, Wiltbank was eventually convinced by Caesar Rodney and Thomas McKean to support the Colonies over Britain. That same year, he was elected a member of Sussex's "Boston Relief Committee," which helped gather funds for the colonists in Massachusetts.

Wiltbank was commissioned in September 1775 major by the Delaware Council of Safety, serving in a military regiment brought up in Sussex. He was also an original member of the Sussex Committee of Safety. In August 1776, he was appointed the military treasurer of the county, which was an important position as funding was vitally needed for the Revolutionary War. In September, Wiltbank represented Sussex County at the Delaware Constitutional Convention, held in New Castle, which led to the creation of the state's first governing document.

Shortly afterwards, Wiltbank was elected to the Legislative Council, now known as the State Senate, in the 1st Delaware General Assembly. He received a total of 542 votes in the election, the highest number for any candidate in his county. On February 21, 1777, Wiltbank was appointed chief justice of the Sussex County Court of Common Pleas and Orphans' Court, and resigned his position in the Legislative Council to serve on the court, taking his oath of office on March 8. He served in that position until his death, being known as an "astute judge and a man of wide interests," according to The Morning News. Wiltbank remained as the military treasurer of Sussex County throughout the remaining years of the war, and was described as having "aided greatly in the war effort."

== Personal life ==
Throughout his life, Wiltbank had an interest in education, and he once donated some of his property for a school to be built. He was for a time an Episcopalian, serving as a trustee at St. Peter's Church, before converting to Methodism and serving the same position with the Bethel Methodist Protestant Church. Wiltbank was wealthy and had two estates by the time of his death, including the 344-acre "Tower Hill" and one called "Dover."

On March 21, 1791, Wiltbank wrote a will, while "in the health of body." On July 3, 1792, he added a codicil, being "weak in body, but of sound and perfect disposing mind memory and judgement." The Pennsylvania Genealogical Magazine wrote that his will and codicil were "drawn with the meticulous care one would expect to be exercised by so eminent a jurist." Included in his will was the distribution of his Negro slaves, each of which he said was to be set free upon reaching the age of 34 and 1/2. Wiltbank died on July 10, 1792, at the age of 60, while residing at his "Dover" estate, near Lewes. Wiltbank was later described in an article by the Pennsylvania Genealogical Magazine as a man "so filled with honors that we must merely enumerate rather than discuss them."
