= Big August Quarterly =

Religious festival in Delaware, U.S.

Coordinates: 39.749466°N 75.561089°W

Big August Quarterly is an annual religious festival held in Wilmington, Delaware (sometimes called "Big Quarterly" or "August Quarterly"). Begun in 1814 by Peter Spencer in connection with the "quarterly" meeting (or "conference") of the African Union Church—of the four meetings during the year, the one in August became the "annual conference" of the Church when ministers' assignments for the next year were announced, among other business—it was a time for free blacks and slaves alike to come together (from the multi-state area) and celebrate their faith with singing, dancing, testifying, and feasting. It is the oldest such celebration in the country.

The August Quarterly became a kind of Independence Day for Black people on the Delmarva Peninsula. In the early years of the festival “abolitionists and Underground Railroad conductors of the stature of Thomas Garrett and Harriet Tubman were often in the Wilmington area to assist slaves who chose to escape”. The Big Quarterly has remained a time of reunion, religious revival and celebration of freedom for the people in and around Wilmington, Delaware.
