= African Union Methodist Protestant Church =

Methodist denomination

- Classification: Methodism
- Orientation: Holiness movement
- Theology: Wesleyan
- Polity: Connexionalism
- Separations: Union American Methodist Episcopal Church (1865)
- Congregations: 40

The African Union Methodist Protestant Church (AUMPC), abbreviated as A.U.M.P. Church, is a Methodist denomination. It was chartered by Peter Spencer (1782–1843) in Wilmington, Delaware, in 1813 as the "Union Church of Africans", where it became known as the "African Union Church".

== History ==
The formation of the African Union Methodist Protestant Church is a part of the history of Methodism in the United States; in 1866, the First Colored Methodist Protestant Church merged with it. This was a Maryland offshoot of the A.M.E. Church, which was based in Philadelphia, Pennsylvania. The Delaware-Maryland denomination renamed itself, combining names, as the African Union First Colored Methodist Protestant Church and Connection, usually called the A.U.M.P. Church. In the 1860s, a schism resulted in some of the congregations forming the "Union American Methodist Episcopal Church" in 1865. The two denominations are now referred to collectively as the "Spencer Churches" (or, less often, the "Union Churches").

Although a decentralized Methodist Protestant church in its earlier years, the A.U.M.P. Church in the 1880s began to consider adopting an episcopal structure. In 1922 it consecrated its first bishop, Daniel J. Russell, Jr. But it was not until 1967 that the Church fully changed to an episcopal structure and consecrated its two leaders as bishops.

The A.U.M.P. Church has a total of about 40 congregations in the area of the mid-Atlantic and Upper South: the states of New York, New Jersey, Pennsylvania, Maryland, Delaware, and the District of Columbia.

== Notable churches ==
- Hosanna Meeting House, built in 1845 in the free Black village of Hinsonville, Chester County, Pennsylvania
- St. John's Church (Ruxton, Maryland), listed on the National Register of Historic Places (NRHP) in 1982
- St. John's African Union Methodist Protestant Church, Goshen, New York, listed on the NRHP in 2010
- Saint Paul African Union Methodist Church, Washington, D.C., listed on the NRHP in 2011
- Mt. Zion A. U. M. P., Marshalltown, NJ, mother church of the New Jersey and Pennsylvania districts. This is the base of bishop and historian Daniel James Russell. It is classified as a contributing resource in the Marshalltown Historic District, which was listed on the NRHP in July 2013
