= 4th Delaware General Assembly =

American legislative session

←	3rd	5th	→

Overview
- Legislative body: Delaware General Assembly
- Term: October 20, 1779 – October 20, 1780

The 4th Delaware General Assembly was a meeting of the legislative branch of the state government, consisting of the Delaware Legislative Council and the Delaware House of Assembly. Elections were held the first day of October and terms began on the twentieth day of October. It met in Dover, convening October 20, 1779, and was the second year of the administration of President Caesar Rodney.

The apportionment of seats was permanently assigned to three councilors and seven assemblymen for each of the three counties. Population of the county did not effect the number of delegates.

== Leadership ==
=== Legislative Council ===
- John Clowes, Sussex County

=== House of Assembly ===
- Simon Kollock, Sussex County

== Members ==
=== Legislative Council ===
Councilors were elected by the public for a three-year term, one third posted each year.

New Castle County

- Richard Cantwell
- Peter Hyatt
- Samuel Patterson

Kent County

- John Banning
- Richard Bassett
- Thomas Collins

Sussex County

- John Clowes
- William Conwell
- William Polk

=== House of Assembly ===
Assemblymen were elected by the public for a one-year term.

New Castle County

- Robert Bryan
- John Clark
- William Clark
- Thomas Duff
- George Latimer
- Joseph Stidham
- Nicholas Van Dyke Sr.

Kent County

- Philip Barratt
- Jehu Davis
- Joseph Hall
- Richard Lockwood
  - William Molleston
- Charles G. Ridgely
- Jacob Stout
- Samuel West

Sussex County

- George Adams
- John Collins
- Robert Houston
- Simon Kollock
- William Peery
- Burton Waples
- Nathaniel Young

== Places with more information ==
- Delaware Historical Society; website; 505 North Market Street, Wilmington, Delaware 19801; (302) 655–7161.
- University of Delaware; Library website; 181 South College Avenue, Newark, Delaware 19717; (302) 831–2965.
