= 3rd Delaware General Assembly =

American legislative session

←	2nd	4th	→

Overview
- Legislative body: Delaware General Assembly
- Term: October 20, 1778 – October 20, 1779

The 3rd Delaware General Assembly was a meeting of the legislative branch of the state government, consisting of the Delaware Legislative Council and the Delaware House of Assembly. Elections were held the first day of October and terms began on the twentieth day of October. It met in Dover, convening October 20, 1778, and was the first year of the administration of President Caesar Rodney.

The apportionment of seats was permanently assigned to three councilors and seven assemblymen for each of the three counties. Population of the county did not effect the number of delegates.

== Leadership ==
=== Legislative Council ===
- Thomas Collins, Kent County

=== House of Assembly ===
- Samuel West, Kent County

== Members ==
=== Legislative Council ===
Councilors were elected by the public for a three-year term, one third posted each year.

New Castle County

- Peter Hyatt
- Samuel Patterson
- George Read

Kent County

- John Banning
- Richard Bassett
- Thomas Collins

Sussex County

- John Clowes
- William Conwell
- William Polk

=== House of Assembly ===
Assemblymen were elected by the public for a one-year term.

New Castle County

- Robert Bryan
- Joshua Clayton
- George Craighead
- John Lea
- Thomas McKean
- Alexander Porter Sr.
- Nicholas Van Dyke Sr.

Kent County

- John Clayton
- John Cook
- Jehu Davis
- Richard Lockwood
- Charles G. Ridgely
- Jacob Stout
- unknown

Sussex County

- George Adams
- Levin Derrickson
- Joseph Hall
- Simon Kollock
- William Peery
- Burton Waples
- unknown

== Places with more information ==
- Delaware Historical Society; website; 505 North Market Street, Wilmington, Delaware 19801; (302) 655-7161.
- University of Delaware; Library website; 181 South College Avenue, Newark, Delaware 19717; (302) 831–2965.
