= Benjamin Ferris (historian) =

Benjamin Ferris (August 7, 1780 - November 9, 1867) was a watchmaker and historian from Wilmington, Delaware.

Ferris was born the sixth of seven children to Ziba Ferris (1743–1794) and Edith Sharpless (1742–1815) in a house on the northeast corner of Third and Shipley Streets in Wilmington. His siblings included silversmith Ziba Ferris and philanthropist Deborah Ferris Bringhurst. He was a descendant of Samuel Ferris, who had come from Reading, England, in 1682 to settle at Groton, Massachusetts, and of John Ferris, who was among the first settlers in the city of Wilmington in 1748.

Ferris moved to Philadelphia at age 14, where he learned the watchmaking business. He was married to Fanny Canby (1778–1833) in Wilmington's Monthly Meeting Cemetery on May 17, 1804. They returned to live in Wilmington in 1813, where he was appointed city surveyor in 1820. The couple had ten children together, William (#1)(1805-1805), Edward (#1)(1809-1810), Anna (#1)(1811–1814), Deborah (1813–1897), Anna (#2)(1815–1890), Benjamin (1817–1831), Martha (1819–1912), David (1821–1908), William (#2)(1822-1909), and Edward (#2)(1825-1919). After the death of his first wife, he married her cousin Hannah Gibbons (1793-1860) on October 15, 1835.

As a member of the Religious Society of Friends, Ferris was a proponent of the views of Elias Hicks, claiming "obedience to the light within" as sufficient for salvation, and publishing a debate with an evangelical minister which contributed to a schism in 1827. In 1839, Ferris was appointed to a committee of the Yearly Meetings of Friends of New York, Philadelphia and Baltimore, to investigate wrongdoings against the Seneca Indians. Although the treaty he recommended was ultimately rejected by the Senate, he was successful in brokering a deal which resulted in about half their land being restored to them.

Ferris was particularly interested in preserving the history of Wilmington, devoting several years of his life to research, and studying the Swedish language to enable him to use the records of the Old Swedes Church. In 1846 he published A History of the Original Settlements on the Delaware: From its Discovery by Hudson to the Colonization under William Penn.
