= 1st Delaware General Assembly =

American legislative session

2nd	→

Overview
- Legislative body: Delaware General Assembly
- Term: October 20, 1776 – October 20, 1777

The 1st Delaware General Assembly was a meeting of the legislative branch of the state government, consisting of the Delaware Legislative Council and the Delaware House of Assembly. Elections were held the first day of October and terms began on the twentieth day of October. It met in the town of New Castle, convening October 20, 1776, and was the administration of President John McKinly, effective on February 12, 1777. McKinly was captured by the British on September 22, 1777, and Thomas McKean replaced him until October 20, 1777.

The apportionment of seats was permanently assigned to three councilors and seven assemblymen for each of the three counties. Population of the county did not affect the number of delegates.

== Leadership ==
=== Legislative Council ===
- George Read, New Castle County

=== House of Assembly ===
- John McKinly, New Castle County

== Members ==
=== Legislative Council ===
Councilors were elected by the public for a three-year term, one third posted each year.

New Castle County

- Richard Cantwell
- George Read
- Nicholas Van Dyke Sr.

Kent County

- Richard Bassett
- Thomas Collins
- James Sykes Sr.
  - John Banning

Sussex County

- Daniel Dingee
- William Polk
  - Samuel S. Sloss
- John Wiltbank
  - John Jones

=== House of Assembly ===
Assemblymen were elected by the public for a one-year term. There were only seven representatives so two or three unidentified persons are unidentified of others.

New Castle County

- George Craighead
- David Finney
- John Jones
- Thomas McKean
- John McKinly
- George Munro
- William Patterson
- Alexander Porter Sr.
- Abraham Robinson
- John Thompson

Kent County

- John Clark
- John Cook
- Jehu Davis
- Robert Dixon
- Richard Lockwood
- Charles G. Ridgely
- Jacob Stout
- Samuel West
- Thomas White

Sussex County

- Isaac Bradley
- Elijah Cannon
- John Clowes
- William Hazzard
- Joshua Hill
- Isaac Horsey
- Phillips Kollock
- John Laws
- Jacob Moore

== Places with more information ==
- Delaware Historical Society; website; 505 North Market Street, Wilmington, Delaware 19801; (302) 655-7161.
- University of Delaware; Library website; 181 South College Avenue, Newark, Delaware 19717; (302) 831–2965.
