= William Peery =

American politician

William Peery (1743 – December 17, 1800) was an American farmer, lawyer, and politician from Cool Spring near Milton, in Sussex County, Delaware. He was a veteran of the American Revolution, a Continental Congressman from Delaware, and a member of the Delaware General Assembly.

Peery lived with his father's family on a farm in Sussex County. Later, he farmed this land himself. In April 1777, during the American Revolution, he was selected to be captain of an independent militia company of 100 men from Sussex County, "for the safeguard of the pilots and the persons and goods of other well affected inhabitants...residing or being near Lewistown and the coasts of Delaware Bay". The area was known for the high level of Loyalist activity and the constant threat of British intervention from the sea. Future Governor David Hazzard was the son of one of his second lieutenants.

They saw some action during the winter of 1777–78 in support of the Flying Camp that helped protect Washington's camp at Valley Forge.

Peery was elected to the State House for the eight sessions from 1777 to 1778 through 1784–85. On November 4, 1785, the General Assembly elected him to be one of their delegates to the Continental Congress and he served for a year. He was then returned to the State House for the 1787–88 session and the 1793–94 and 1794–95 sessions. From 1785 to 1796 he served as the county Treasurer for Sussex County.

Peery died on December 17, 1800, in Lewes, Delaware, and is buried in the Cool Spring Prebsbyterian Church Cemetery near Lewes.
