= Rockwood Museum and Park =

Historic house in Delaware, US

Rockwood Park & Museum
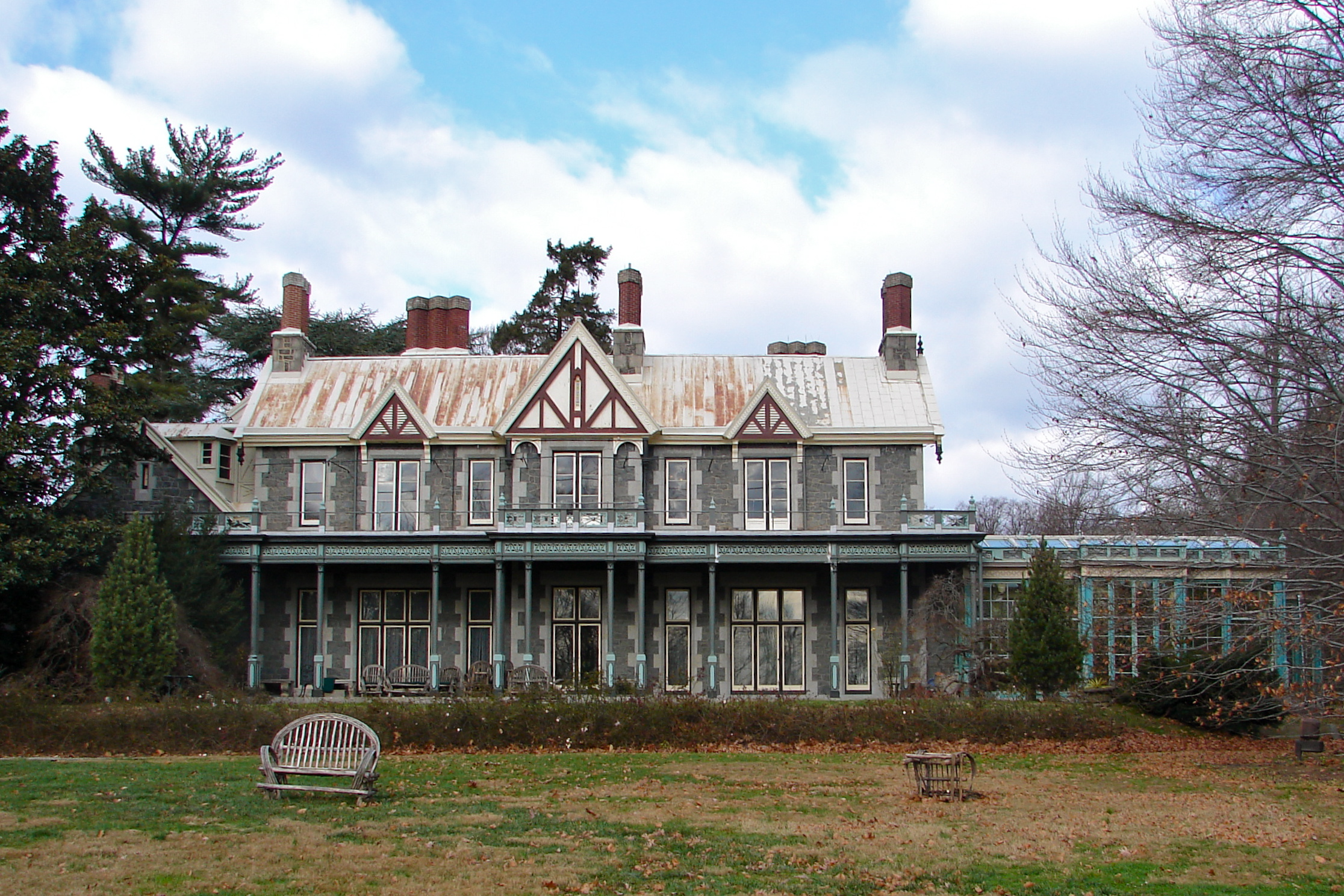
- Rockwood House, December 2010
- Interactive map of Rockwood Park & Museum
- Type: Public Park, Garden & Museum
- Location: 4651 Washington Street Extension; Wilmington, Delaware 19809
- Coordinates: 39.77250°N 75.52082°W
- Area: 29 hectares (72 acres)
- Created: 1851-1854
- Operator: New Castle County
- Open
- Rockwood
- U.S. National Register of Historic Places
- Location within Delaware Location within the United States
- Location: 4651 Washington Street Extension, Wilmington, Delaware
- Area: 162 acres (66 ha)
- Built: 1851-1854
- Architect: Williams, George
- Architectural style: Gothic Revival, Rural Gothic
- NRHP reference No.: 76000579; 100008808 (decrease)

Significant dates
- Added to NRHP: July 12, 1976
- Boundary decrease: April 19, 2023
- Status: Open Wednesday-Saturday: Tours given Friday & Saturday at 10, 12 & 2

Rockwood is an English-style country estate and museum located in Wilmington, Delaware. Built between 1851 and 1854 by banker Joseph Shipley, Rockwood is an excellent example of Rural Gothic Revival Architecture. It was added to the National Register of Historic Places in 1976.

== History ==
Rockwood Mansion was built between 1851 and 1854 for Joseph Shipley, a merchant banker originally from Wilmington. The Mansion was Shipley's retirement home. Shipley spent most of his life in Liverpool, England where he became wealthy. Rockwood Mansion was inspired by Wyncote, Joseph Shipley's English country house designed by George Williams. Shipley had Williams design Rockwood Mansion, though he had never seen the site. Joseph Shipley moved his entire household from England bringing his favorite dog and horse (Toby and Branker), as well as gardener Robert Shaw and housekeeper Audrey Douglas.

After Joseph Shipley's death, Rockwood eventually became the property of his great nephew Edward Bringhurst Jr. in 1891. Bringhurst with his wife Anna and their three younger children Mary, Edith and Edward moved into Rockwood the next year. The Bringhurst's eldest daughter Elizabeth Bringhurst Galt-Smith, affectionately known as Bessie, was married and living in a castle in Ireland at the time. Bessie was responsible for much of the decorative features of the Mansion during this period. The mansion currently represents the 1890s when the Bringhurst family moved into Rockwood, including much of Joseph Shipley's furniture (imported from England) which was bought at the auction of his estate, and is still is in place at Rockwood.

The estate passed to Mary Bringhurst who lived to age 100, and left the mansion to her niece Nancy Sellers Hargraves, who left it to an unnamed non-profit "for the enjoyment of present and future generations." New Castle County received the mansion and acreage in 1973, with the Friends of Rockwood as caretakers. The mansion underwent extensive restoration by New Castle County in 1999. The 72 acres of Rockwood Mansion Park includes the Mansion & Conservatory, Porter's Lodge, Gardener's Cottage, and Barn & Carriage House.

== Architecture ==
The Mansion was designed in the "Rural Gothic" style by English architect George Williams. The Rural Gothic was the most up-to-date style at the time, and took its inspiration from rural domestic buildings of 400 years earlier. The best known Rural Gothic home is William Morris' Red House, built in 1860 in England. The style avoided all the tracery and pinnacles that made Gothic Revival buildings look like churches. Rural Gothic was rather plain, and avoided symmetry.

The six acre historic garden of Rockwood, extent from the early 1850s, is surrounded by a ha-ha (a sunken wall used on English estates instead of a fence to keep livestock away from the house, so it appears that the lawns are continuous). The landscape at Rockwood is referred to as Mixed Style, then very much in favor, a style which combined all the best features of the broader English Naturalistic style, which began in the 1730s. This style is characterized by wide open lawns. sweeping vistas, curving paths, and trees and shrubs bordering the lawn. The landscape underwent extensive restoration in 1999, based on the many receipts for plants, as well as extensive historic photographs.

In 2009 the University of Delaware acquired Rockwood's archives as a gift from New Castle County.

== On television ==
Rockwood was featured on an episode of My Ghost Story airing on the Biography Channel on October 29, 2011. The mansion was also featured on a season 11 episode of Ghost Hunters.

== Tours ==
The Mansion is open 10am to 4pm Wednesday through Saturday, tours are currently available on Fridays and Saturdays at 10am, 12pm & 2pm. Tours are $10 for adults, and $4 for children. The Park has lighted walking trails, and the park is open dawn to dusk, daily. Trail maps and self-guided Historic Landscape Garden tour brochures are available at the mansion Wednesday - Sunday 10am - 4pm. The Mansion is closed on major holidays.

== See also ==
- List of museums in Delaware
- National Register of Historic Places listings in Wilmington, Delaware
