= 2nd Delaware General Assembly =

American legislative session

←	1st	3rd	→

Overview
- Legislative body: Delaware General Assembly
- Term: October 20, 1777 – October 20, 1778

The 2nd Delaware General Assembly was a meeting of the legislative branch of the state government, consisting of the Delaware Legislative Council and the Delaware House of Assembly. Elections were held the first day of October and terms began on the twentieth day of October. It met in Dover, convening October 20, 1777, and was the administration of President George Read. He resigned and was replaced by President Caesar Rodney, effective March 31, 1778.

The apportionment of seats was permanently assigned to three councilors and seven assemblymen for each of the three counties. Population of the county did not effect the number of delegates.

== Leadership ==
=== Legislative Council ===
- George Read, New Castle County

=== House of Assembly ===
- Samuel West, Kent County

== Members ==
=== Legislative Council ===
Councilors were elected by the public for a three-year term, one third posted each year.

New Castle County

- Peter Hyatt
- George Read
- Nicholas Van Dyke Sr.

Kent County

- John Banning
- Richard Bassett
- Thomas Collins

Sussex County

- John Clowes
- John Jones
- Samuel S. Sloss
  - William Conwell

=== House of Assembly ===
Assemblymen were elected by the public for a one-year term.

New Castle County

- Robert Armstrong
- James Black
- Robert Bryan
- William Clark
- George Craighead
- Isaac Lewis
- Samuel Patterson

Kent County

- John Clayton
- Jehu Davis
- Richard Lockwood
- William Molleston
- Charles G. Ridgely
- Jacob Stout
- Samuel West

Sussex County

- George Adams
- John Collins
- Levin Derrickson
- Joseph Hall
- Simon Kollock
- William Peery
- Nathaniel Waples

== Places with more information ==
- Delaware Historical Society; website; 505 North Market Street, Wilmington, Delaware 19801; (302) 655-7161.
- University of Delaware; Library website; 181 South College Avenue, Newark, Delaware 19717; (302) 831–2965.
