= History of Delaware =

The history of Delaware as a political entity dates back to the early colonization of North America by European settlers. Delaware is made up of three counties established in 1638, before the time of William Penn. Each county had its own settlement history. The state's early colonists tended to identify more closely with their county than Delaware as a whole. Large parts of southern and western Delaware were thought to have been in Maryland until 1767. The state has existed in the wide economic and political circle of the nearby Pennsylvanian city of Philadelphia.

== Native Americans ==
Before Delaware was settled by Europeans, the area was home to the Lenni Lenape (also known as the Delaware), Susquehanna, Nanticoke, and other Native American tribes. After the Swedes, Dutch colonists settled Delaware, with the native people trading with European settlers for around a half-century.

== Dutch and Swedish colonies ==
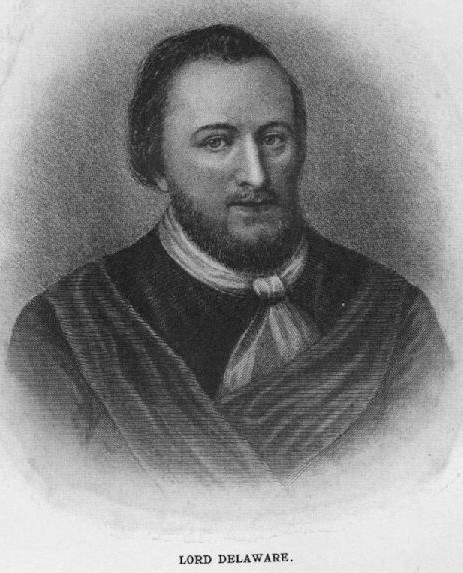
Delaware was named for Thomas West, 3rd Baron De La Warr, an English merchant and governor of the Colony of Virginia from 1610 to 1618.

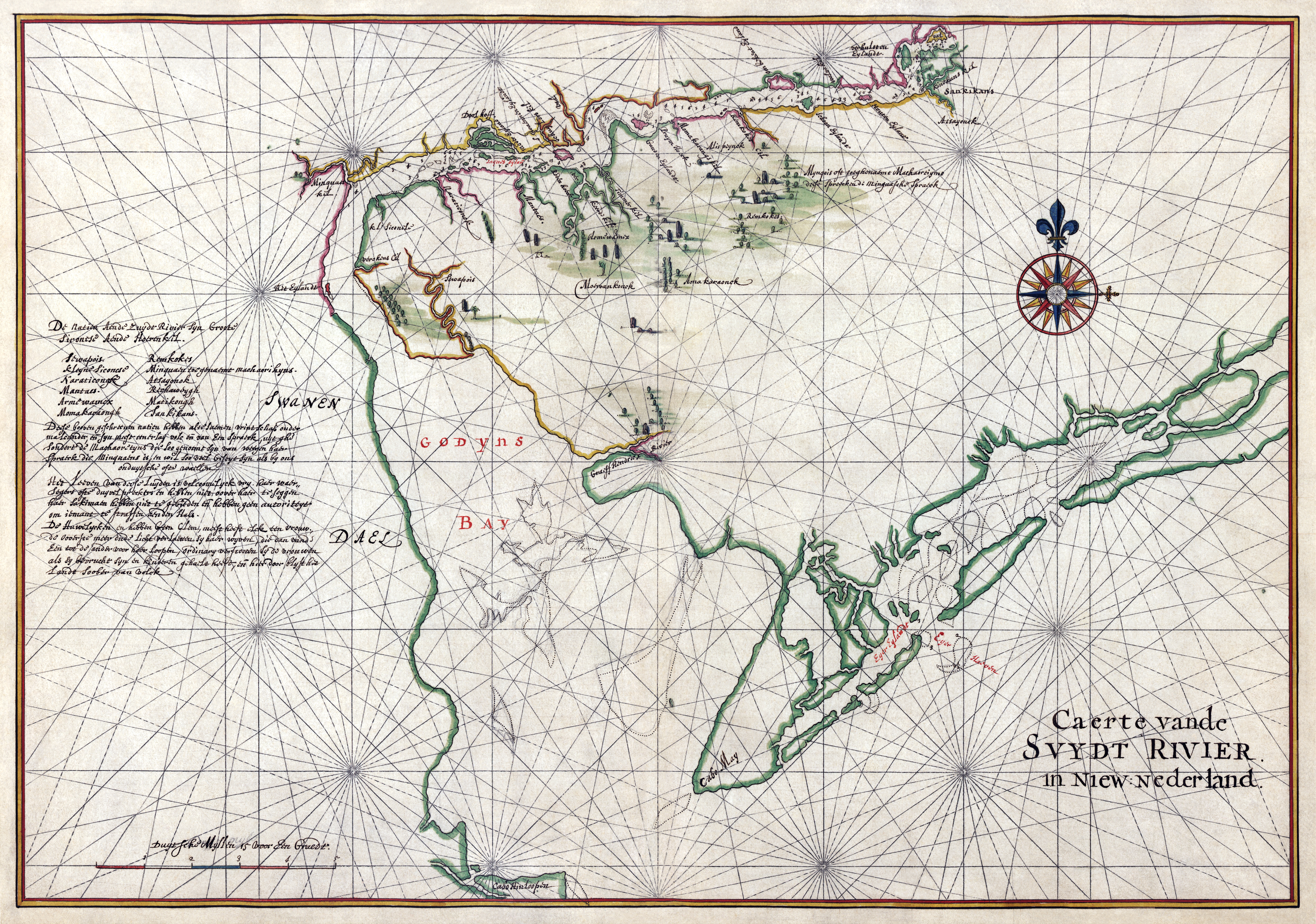
Nautical chart of the Dutch colony Zwaanendael and Godyn's Bay (Delaware Bay), 1639

The Delaware watershed was claimed by the English based on the explorations of John Cabot in 1497, Captain John Smith, and others and was given the name of a title held by Thomas West, 3rd Baron De La Warr, the governor of Virginia from 1610 until 1618. At that time, the area was considered to be part of the Virginia colony.

However, the Dutch thought they also had a claim based on the 1609 explorations of Henry Hudson, and under the auspices of the Dutch West India Company, were the first Europeans to actually occupy the land. They established trading-posts: Fort Wilhelmus in 1624 at "Hooghe Eyland" (High Island), now Burlington Island, opposite Burlington, New Jersey; Fort Nassau, near Gloucester City, New Jersey, in 1626; and at Zwaanendael, now Lewes, Delaware, in 1631. Peter Minuit was the Dutch Director-General of New Netherland during this period and probably spent some time at the Burlington Island post, thereby familiarizing himself with the region.

In any case, Minuit had a disagreement with the directors of the Dutch West India Company, was recalled from New Netherland, and quickly made his services available to his many friends in Sweden, then a major power in European politics. They established a Swedish South Company, aimed at settling the territory of New Sweden, and, following much negotiation, he led a group under the flag of Sweden to the Delaware River in 1638. They established a trading post at Fort Christina, now in Wilmington. Minuit claimed possession of the western side of the Delaware River, saying he had found no European settlement there. Unlike the Dutch West India Company, the Swedes intended to actually bring settlers to their outpost and begin a colony.

Minuit drowned in a hurricane on the way home that same year, but the Swedish colony continued to grow gradually. By 1644, Swedish and Finnish settlers were living along both sides of the Delaware River from Fort Christina to the Schuylkill River. New Sweden's best known governor, Johan Björnsson Printz, moved his residence to what is now Tinicum Township, Pennsylvania, where he intended to concentrate the settlements.

While the Dutch settlement at Zwaanendael ("swan valley"), or present-day Lewes, was soon destroyed in a war with Native Americans, the Dutch never gave up their claim to the area, and in 1651 built Fort Casimir, now New Castle, under the leadership of Peter Stuyvesant. Three years later, in 1654, Johan Risingh, the Swedish governor, captured Fort Casimir from the Dutch. For the Swedes, this was a catastrophic miscalculation, as the next summer, 1655, an enraged Stuyvesant led another Dutch expedition to the Delaware River, attacked all the Swedish communities and forcibly ended the New Sweden colony, incorporating the whole area back into the New Netherland colony.

== English colony ==
It was not long, though, before the Dutch too were forcibly removed by the English, who asserted their earlier claim. In 1664, James, the Duke of York and brother of King Charles II, outfitted an expedition that easily ousted the Dutch from both the Delaware and Hudson rivers, leaving the Duke of York the proprietary authority in the entire area.

But Cecil Calvert, 2nd Baron Baltimore, Proprietor of Maryland, claimed a competing grant to lands on the western shore of Delaware Bay, including all of the present state of Delaware. In deference to the royal will of Charles II to please his brother, James, Duke of York, Calvert did not press his claim. James, the Duke of York, believed he had won the area in war and was justified in ownership. The area was administered from New York as a part of James' New York colony.

William Penn was granted "Pennsylvania", in which the grant specifically excluded New Castle or any of the lands within 12 miles (19 km) of it. Nevertheless, Penn wanted an outlet to the sea from his new province. He persuaded James to lease him the western shore of Delaware Bay. So, in 1682, Penn arrived in New Castle with two documents: a charter for the Province of Pennsylvania and a lease for what became known as "the Lower Counties on the Delaware".

Penn had inherited James' claims and thus began nearly 100 years of litigation between Penn and Baltimore, and their heirs, in the High Court of Chancery in London. The settlement of the legal battles was started by the heirs' agreeing to the survey performed by Charles Mason and Jeremiah Dixon between 1763 and 1767. Their work resulted in the famous Mason–Dixon line. The final adjudication of the settlement was not completed until the eve of the American Revolution. The settlement was a major reason for the close political alliance between the property owners of the Lower Counties and the Royalist Proprietary government.

In William Penn's Frame of Government of 1682, he established a combined assembly for his domain by providing for equal membership from each county and requiring legislation to have the assent of both the Lower Counties and the Upper Counties of Chester, Philadelphia and Bucks. The assembly meeting place alternated between Philadelphia and New Castle. Once Philadelphia began to grow, its leaders resented having to go to New Castle and gain agreement of the assemblymen from the sparsely populated Lower Counties. In 1704, members of the two regions mutually agreed to meet and pass laws separately from then on. The Lower Counties did continue to share a governor, but the province of Pennsylvania never merged with the Lower Counties.

The Mason–Dixon line forms the boundary between Delaware and Maryland; this begins at the Transpeninsular Line. The border between Pennsylvania and Delaware is formed by an arc known as the Twelve-Mile Circle laid out in the seventeenth century to clearly delineate the area within the sphere of influence of New Castle. A small dispute lingered until 1921 over an area known as the Wedge, where the Mason–Dixon line and the Twelve-Mile Circle left a fragment of land claimed by both Pennsylvania and Delaware.

== American Revolution ==
Delaware was one of the Thirteen Colonies which revolted against British rule in the American Revolution. The American Revolutionary War began in April 1775, and on June 15, 1776, the Delaware Assembly voted to break all ties with Great Britain (and, simultaneously, with Pennsylvania). The Delaware Constitution of 1776 changed the name of the polity from The Counties of New Castle, Kent and Sussex upon Delaware (also known as the Lower Counties) to The Delaware State. Its first independent governors went by the title of "President".

The Battle of Cooch's Bridge was the only major military engagement of the Revolution that took place on Delaware soil. The engagement began August 30, 1777, about 2 miles (3 km) south of Cooch's Bridge (located in present-day Newark). The Americans harried the lead forces of the British Army. However, the roughly 700 colonials were greatly outmanned and outgunned. Washington's troops were slowly driven back.

By September 3, the colonials had dropped back to Cooch's Bridge. A handpicked regiment of 100 marksmen under General William Maxwell laid an ambush in the surrounding cover. Over the ensuing battle, several British and Hessian charges were repelled, but the Americans soon depleted their ammunition and called a retreat.

The property was taken by the British, and several buildings were burned. General Cornwallis used the Cooch house as his headquarters for the next week as the British regrouped. American casualties numbered around 30.

Shortly afterward, General Howe moved his troops out. On September 11, he defeated the colonials in the Battle of Brandywine and subsequently captured the colonial capital of Philadelphia.

Delaware had a Loyalist insurrection in April 1778 called the Clow Rebellion.

In 1783, the independence of the United States and therefore Delaware was confirmed in the Treaty of Paris.

== 1783–1860 ==
Delaware was the first state to ratify the United States Constitution.

Éleuthère Irénée du Pont arrived from France in 1800. In 1804 he established the largest gunpowder factory in the United States on the banks of the Brandywine River just north of Wilmington. His DuPont firm (now the world's fourth largest chemical company) was the U.S. military's largest supplier of gunpowder by the beginning of the Civil War, and his descendants, the du Pont family, are now one of the richest and most successful families in the country.

The oldest black church in the country was chartered in Delaware by former slave Peter Spencer in 1813 as the "Union Church of Africans", which is now the A.U.M.P. Church. The Big August Quarterly which began in 1814 is still celebrated and is the oldest such cultural festival in the country.

The construction of the Chesapeake and Delaware Canal between 1802 and 1829 brought significant shipping interests to Delaware, expanding the state's commercial opportunities.

=== Population ===
Census year	New Castle County population	percentage of state population	Kent County population	percentage of state population	Sussex County population	percentage of state population	Delaware total
1790	19,688	33%	18,920	32%	20,488	35%	59,096
1800	25,361	39%	19,554	30%	19,358	30%	64,273
1810	24,429	34%	20,495	28%	27,750	38%	72,674
1820	27,899	38%	20,793	29%	24,057	33%	72,749
1830	29,720	39%	19,913	26%	27,115	35%	76,748
1840	33,120	42%	19,872	25%	25,093	32%	78,085

== Delaware in the Civil War ==
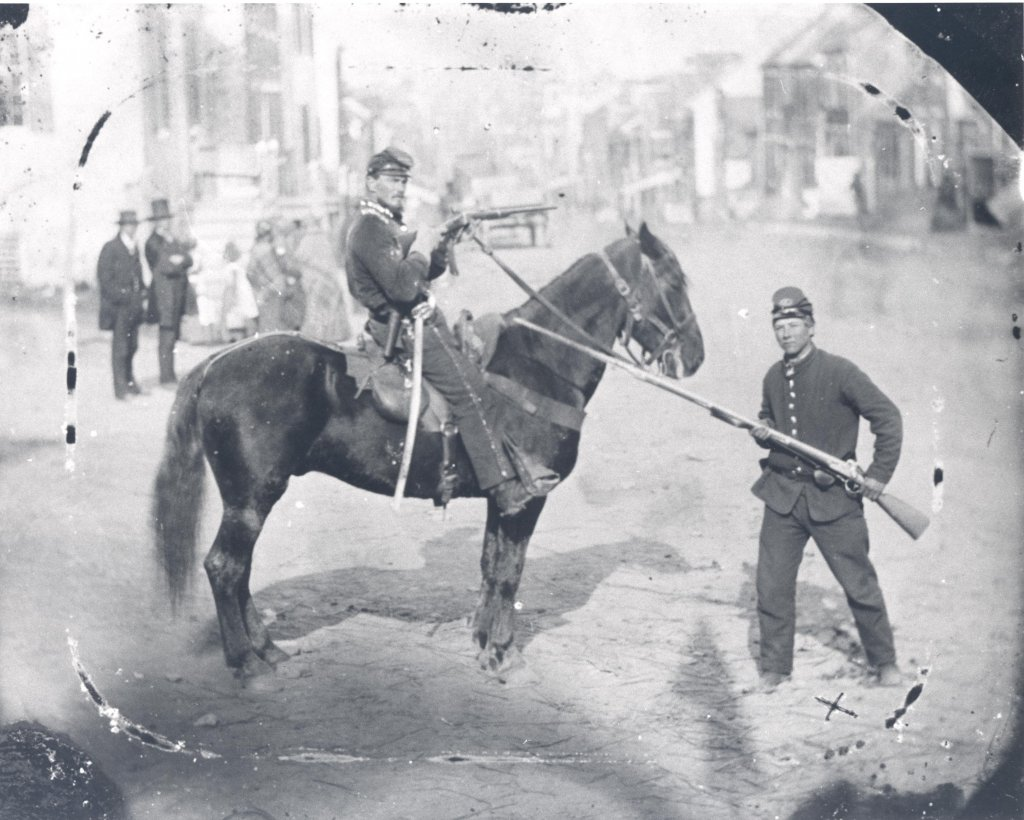
Napoleon B. Knight of the 1st Delaware Cavalry, Westminster, Maryland, 1863.

Slavery had been a divisive issue in Delaware for decades before the American Civil War began. Opposition to slavery in Delaware, imported from Quaker-dominated Pennsylvania, led many slaveowners to free their slaves; half of the state's black population was free by 1810, and more than 90% were free by 1860. This trend also led pro-slavery legislators to restrict free black organizations, and the constabulary in Wilmington was accused of harsh enforcement of runaway slave laws, while many Delawareans kidnapped free blacks among the large communities throughout the state and sold them to plantations further south.

During the secession crisis of late 1860 - early 1861, the Southern states sent commissioners to try to convince Delaware to join them in leaving the Union, but the state legislature voting against holding a state secession convention on January 3, 1861. However, throughout the war years Delaware politics continued to be dominated by Democrats, many of whom sympathized with the South and opposed efforts to abolish slavery. Despite its small size, with a population of only 112,000 in 1860, Delaware supplied more than 12,000 men for the Union army, and the DuPont powder mills in Wilmington were an essential source of gunpowder for the Northern war effort.

Although most Delaware citizens who fought in the Civil War served in regiments on the Union side, some did, in fact, serve in Delaware companies on the Confederate side in the Maryland and Virginia Regiments. Delaware was the one slave state from which the Confederate States of America could not recruit a full regiment.

On February 8, 1865, two months before the end of the Civil War, Delaware voted to reject the Thirteenth Amendment to the United States Constitution and so voted to continue slavery beyond the Civil War. However, the gesture proved futile when other states ratified the amendment, which took effect in December 1865 and thereby ended slavery in Delaware. In a symbolic move, Delaware belatedly ratified the amendment on February 12, 1901 – 35 years after national ratification and 38 years after Lincoln's Emancipation Proclamation. Delaware also rejected the 14th Amendment and 15th Amendment during the Reconstruction Era.

== 1865–1899 ==
After the Civil War, Democratic governments continued to dominate the South and imposed explicitly white supremacist regimes in the former slave states. The Delaware legislature declared blacks to be second-class citizens in 1866 and restricted their voting rights despite the Fifteenth Amendment, ensuring continued Democratic success in the state throughout most of the nineteenth century. Fearful that the 1875 Civil Rights Act passed by Congress might establish social equality, Delaware legislators passed Jim Crow laws that mandated racial segregation in public facilities and effectively codified the state's tradition of white supremacy. Delaware's segregation was written into the state constitution, which, while providing at Article X, Section 2, that "no distinction shall be made on account of race or color", nonetheless required that "separate schools for white and colored children shall be maintained."

== 1900–present ==
In 1952, Gebhart v. Belton was decided by the Delaware Court of Chancery and affirmed by the Delaware Supreme Court in the same year. Gebhart was one of the five cases combined into Brown v. Board of Education, the 1954 decision of the United States Supreme Court which found racial segregation in United States public schools to be unconstitutional.

The result of the Gebhart and Brown litigation was that Delaware became fully integrated, albeit with time and much effort. The white supremacist Bryant Bowles raised $6,000 and founded the National Association for the Advancement of White People (NAAWP) to oppose the rulings. Bowles briefly attracted nationwide attention for leading a pro-segregation boycott of Milford High School. A mass meeting in Milford in October 1954 attracted a crowd of 3,000 people. Bowles encouraged a boycott to protest the integration of schools after eleven black students were enrolled in the previously racially segregated school. Only 456 out of 1562 students attended the next day, and the movement gained traction in the nearby town of Lincoln, where 116 of the 146 pupils in the local elementary school boycotted in solidarity. Mass protests continued in Milford; the school board eventually ceded to the protestors, expelling the black students. Several weeks later, Bowles was arrested for "conspiring to violate the state education law by leading a boycott at Milford’s integrated high school". The Attorney General later took action to revoke the NAAWP's corporate charter in September 1955. However, the ensuing unrest, which included cross burnings, rallies, and pro-segregation demonstrations, contributed to desegregation in most of Southern Delaware being delayed for another ten years. School segregation in the state would not end until 1967.

== See also ==
- Historical outline of Delaware
- List of historical societies in Delaware
- Women's suffrage in Delaware
- History of slavery in Delaware

== Sources ==
- Hancock, Harold Bell. (1961). Delaware during the Civil War. Wilmington, Delaware: Historical Society of Delaware. ISBN 0-924117-24-9.
- Hearn, Chester G. (2011). The Civil War State by State. Totnes, Devon: BlueRed Press. ISBN 978-1-908247-04-9.
- Hoffecker, Carol E. (2004). Democracy in Delaware. Wilmington, Delaware: Cedar Tree Books. ISBN 1-892142-23-6.
- Martin, Roger A. (1984). A History of Delaware Through its Governors. Wilmington, Delaware: McClafferty Press.
- Martin, Roger A. (1995). Memoirs of the Senate. Newark, DE: Roger A. Martin.
- Munroe, John A. (2004). The Philadelawareans. Newark, Delaware: University of Delaware Press. ISBN 0-87413-872-8.
- Munroe, John A. (1993). History of Delaware. Newark, Delaware: University of Delaware Press. ISBN 0-87413-493-5. online free to borrow
- Scharf, John Thomas (1888). History of Delaware 1609-1888. 2 vols. Philadelphia: L. J. Richards & Co. online free to borrow
- Wilson, Emerson. (1969). Forgotten Heroes of Delaware. Cambridge, Massachusetts: Deltos Publishing Company.
