= 1862 in the United States =

- Decades: 1840s; 1850s; 1860s; 1870s; 1880s
- See also: History of the United States (1849–1865); Timeline of United States history (1860–1899); List of years in the United States

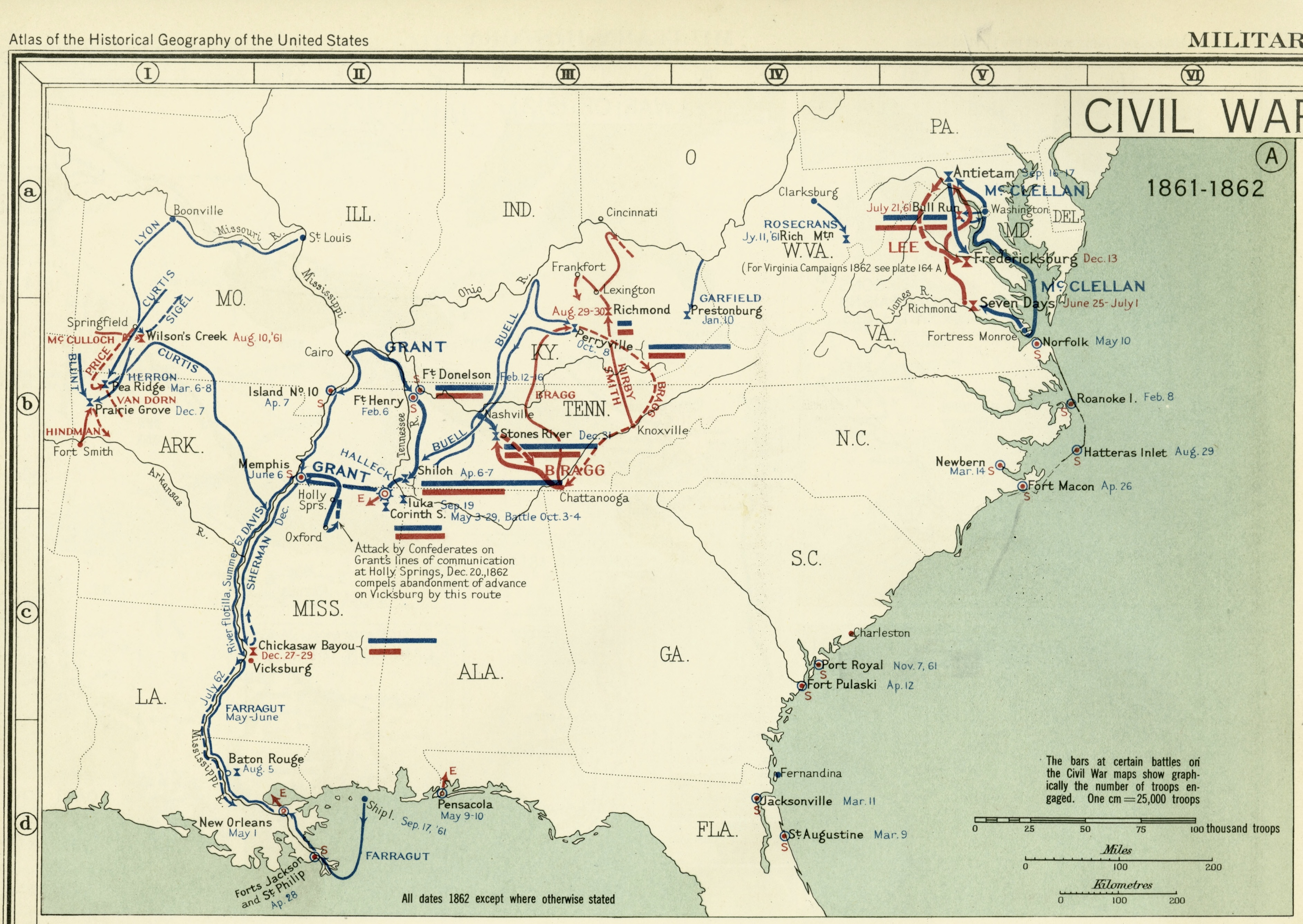
Military actions of the American Civil in 1861 and 1862

Events from the year 1862 in the United States.

== Incumbents ==
=== Federal government ===
- President: Abraham Lincoln (R-Illinois)
- Vice President: Hannibal Hamlin (R-Maine)
- Chief Justice: Roger B. Taney (Maryland)
- Speaker of the House of Representatives: Galusha A. Grow (R-Pennsylvania)
- Congress: 37th

==== State governments ====
Governors and lieutenant governors

=== Governors ===
- Governor of Alabama: John Gill Shorter (Democratic)
- Governor of Arkansas: Henry Massey Rector (Democratic) (until November 4), Harris Flanagin (Democratic) (starting November 4)
- Governor of California: John G. Downey (Democratic) (until January 10), Leland Stanford (Republican) (starting January 10)
- Governor of Connecticut: William A. Buckingham (Republican)
- Governor of Delaware: William Burton (Democratic)
- Governor of Florida: John Milton (Democratic)
- Governor of Georgia: Joseph E. Brown (Democratic)
- Governor of Illinois: Richard Yates (Republican)
- Governor of Indiana: Oliver P. Morton (Republican)
- Governor of Iowa: Samuel J. Kirkwood (Republican)
- Governor of Kansas: Charles L. Robinson (Republican)
- Governor of Kentucky: Beriah Magoffin (Democratic) (until August 18), James F. Robinson (Democratic) (starting August 18)
- Governor of Louisiana: Thomas Overton Moore (Democratic)
- Governor of Maine: Israel Washburn, Jr. (Republican)
- Governor of Maryland: Thomas H. Hicks (Know Nothing)/(Republican) (until January 8), Augustus Bradford (Union) (starting January 8)
- Governor of Massachusetts: John Albion Andrew (Republican)
- Governor of Michigan: Austin Blair (Republican)
- Governor of Minnesota: Alexander Ramsey (Republican)
- Governor of Mississippi: John J. Pettus (Democratic)
- Governor of Missouri: Hamilton Rowan Gamble (Republican)
- Governor of New Hampshire: Nathaniel S. Berry (Republican)
- Governor of New Jersey: Charles Smith Olden (Republican)
- Governor of New York: Edwin D. Morgan (Republican) (until end of December 31)
- Governor of North Carolina: Henry Toole Clark (Democratic) (until September 8), Zebulon Baird Vance (Conservative) (starting September 8)
- Governor of Ohio: William Dennison (Republican) (until January 13), David Tod (Republican) (starting January 13)
- Governor of Oregon: John Whiteaker (Democratic) (until September 10), A. C. Gibbs (Republican) (starting September 10)
- Governor of Pennsylvania: Andrew Gregg Curtin (Republican)
- Governor of Rhode Island: William Sprague IV (Republican)
- Governor of South Carolina: Francis Wilkinson Pickens (Democratic) (until December 17), Milledge Luke Bonham (Democratic) (starting December 17)
- Governor of Tennessee: Isham G. Harris (Democratic) (until March 12), Andrew Johnson (Union) (starting March 12)
- Governor of Texas: Francis R. Lubbock (Democratic)
- Governor of Vermont: Frederick Holbrook (Republican)
- Governor of Virginia: John Letcher (Democratic)
- Governor of Wisconsin:
  - until January 6: Alexander W. Randall (Republican)
  - January 6-April 19: Louis P. Harvey (Republican)
  - starting April 19: Edward Salomon (Republican)

=== Lieutenant governors ===
- Lieutenant Governor of California: Pablo de la Guerra (Democratic) (starting January 10), John F. Chellis (Republican) (starting January 10)
- Lieutenant Governor of Connecticut: Roger Averill (Republican)
- Lieutenant Governor of Illinois: Francis Hoffmann (Republican)
- Lieutenant Governor of Indiana: John R. Cravens (Republican)
- Lieutenant Governor of Iowa: Nicholas J. Rusch (Republican) (starting January 19), John R. Needham (Republican) (starting January 19)
- Lieutenant Governor of Kansas: Joseph Pomeroy Root (Republican)
- Lieutenant Governor of Kentucky: vacant
- Lieutenant Governor of Louisiana: Henry M. Hyams (Democratic)
- Lieutenant Governor of Massachusetts: John Nesmith (Republican)
- Lieutenant Governor of Michigan: Henry T. Backus (Republican)
- Lieutenant Governor of Minnesota: Ignatius L. Donnelly (Republican)
- Lieutenant Governor of Missouri: William Preble Hall (Republican)
- Lieutenant Governor of New York: Robert Campbell (Republican) (until end of December 31)
- Lieutenant Governor of Ohio: Robert C. Kirk (Republican) (until January 13), Benjamin Stanton (Republican) (starting January 13)
- Lieutenant Governor of Rhode Island: Samuel G. Arnold (Republican) (until month and day unknown), vacant (starting month and day unknown)
- Lieutenant Governor of South Carolina: W. W. Harllee (Democratic) (until December 17), Plowden Weston (Democratic) (starting December 17)
- Lieutenant Governor of Texas: John McClannahan Crockett (Democratic)
- Lieutenant Governor of Vermont: Levi Underwood (Republican) (until month and day unknown), Paul Dillingham (Republican) (starting month and day unknown)
- Lieutenant Governor of Virginia: Robert Latane Montague (no political party)
- Lieutenant Governor of Wisconsin: Butler G. Noble (Republican) (until January 6), Edward Salomon (Republican) (starting January 6)

== Events ==
=== January ===
- January 3 – American Civil War: Battle of Cockpit Point fought in Virginia.
- January 8 – American Civil War: Battle of Roan's Tan Yard in Missouri.
- January 10 – John Gately Downey, 7th governor of California, is succeeded by Amasa Leland Stanford.
- January 19 – American Civil War: Battle of Mill Springs in Kentucky.
- January 30 – The first U.S. ironclad warship, USS Monitor, is launched at Greenpoint, Brooklyn.
- January 31 – Alvan Graham Clark makes the first observation of Sirius B, a white dwarf star, through an eighteen-inch telescope at Northwestern University.
- In the Great Flood of 1862, San Francisco receives 24.49 inches (622.0 mm) of rainfall for January, its highest monthly rainfall on record, and the “rain year” total from July 1861 to June of 49.27 inches (1,251.5 mm) is also the highest ever.

=== February ===
- February 1 – Julia Ward Howe's Battle Hymn of the Republic is published for the first time in the Atlantic Monthly.
- February 6 – American Civil War: General Ulysses S. Grant gives the Union Army its first major victory of the war, by capturing Fort Henry, Tennessee.
- February 15 – American Civil War: General Ulysses S. Grant attacks Fort Donelson, Tennessee and captures it the next day.
- February 21 – American Civil War: Battle of Valverde fought near Fort Craig in New Mexico Territory.
- February 22 – American Civil War: Jefferson Davis is officially inaugurated in Richmond, Virginia, to a 6-year term as president of the Confederate States of America.

=== March ===
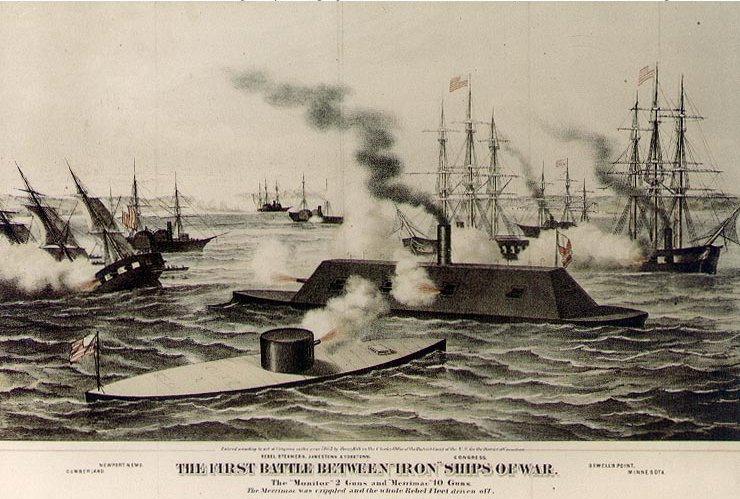
March 8–9: Battle of Hampton Roads, the first battle between two ironclad warships

- March 7 – American Civil War: The Battle of Pea Ridge – The Confederates are shut out of Missouri.
- March 8 – American Civil War: The ironclad CSS Virginia (formerly USS Merrimack) is launched at Hampton Roads, Virginia.
- March 8–9 – American Civil War: Battle of Hampton Roads – The first battle between two ironclad warships, USS Monitor and CSS Virginia.
- March 13 – American Civil War: The U.S. federal government forbids all Union army officers from returning fugitive slaves, thus effectively annulling the Fugitive Slave Law of 1850 and setting the stage for the Emancipation Proclamation.
- March 14 – American Civil War: Battle of New Bern fought in North Carolina.
- March 26–28 – American Civil War: Battle of Glorieta Pass – In New Mexico, Union forces succeed in stopping the Confederate invasion of New Mexico Territory.

=== April ===
- April 5 – American Civil War: Battle of Yorktown – The battle begins when Union forces under General George B. McClellan close in on the Confederate capital Richmond, Virginia.
- April 6–7 – American Civil War: Battle of Shiloh – Union Army under General Ulysses S. Grant defeats the Confederates near Shiloh, Tennessee.
- April 10 – American Civil War: Battle of Fort Pulaski – Union blockade closes Savannah, Georgia. The Parrott rifle, a field artillery weapon, demonstrates its ability to make masonry forts obsolete.
- April 12 – American Civil War: Great Locomotive Chase (Andrews' Raid) – Union volunteers steal Confederate steam railroad locomotive The General in an attempt to sabotage the Western and Atlantic Railroad.
- April 16 – Slavery in Washington, D.C. is abolished when the District of Columbia Compensated Emancipation Act becomes law.
- April 25 – American Civil War: Capture of New Orleans – Forces under Union Admiral David Farragut occupy the Confederate city of New Orleans, Louisiana, securing access to the Mississippi.
- April 26
  - American Civil War: The besieged Confederate garrison at Fort Macon, North Carolina surrenders.
  - The California Anti-Coolie Act.

=== May ===
- May 2 – The California State Normal School (later San Jose State University) is created by an Act of the California legislature.
- May 5 – American Civil War: Battle of Williamsburg – McClellan and Longstreet fight an inconclusive battle in Williamsburg, Virginia.
- May 9 – United States Naval Academy is relocated from Annapolis, Maryland to Newport, Rhode Island.
- May 11 – American Civil War: The ironclad CSS Virginia is scuttled in the James River northwest of Norfolk, Virginia.
- May 15 – President Abraham Lincoln signs a bill into law creating the United States Bureau of Agriculture (later renamed the Department of Agriculture).
- May 20 – President Abraham Lincoln signs the Homestead Act into law.

=== June ===
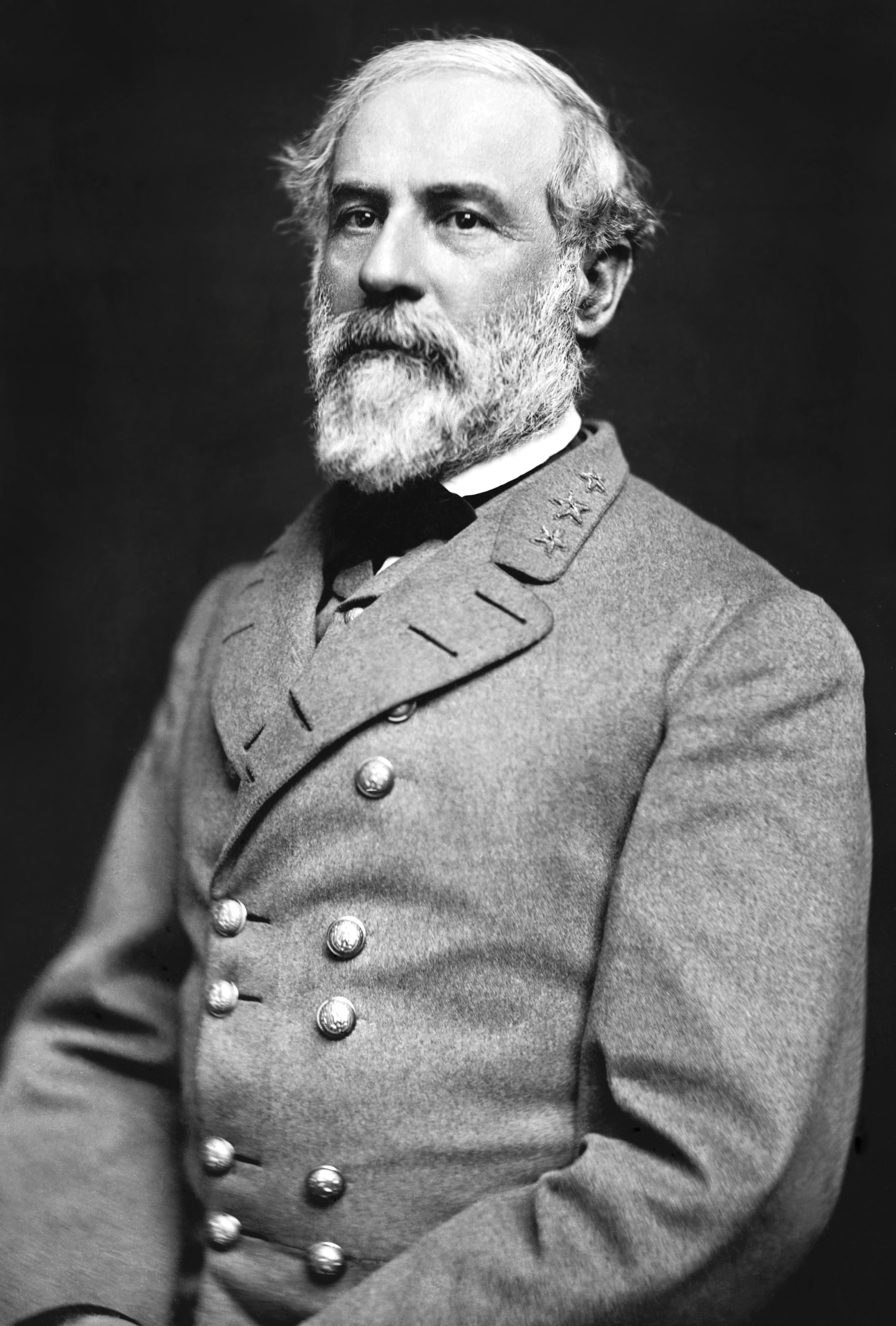
June 1: Robert E. Lee commands the Army of Northern Virginia

- June 1 – American Civil War:
  - Robert E. Lee takes command of the Army of Northern Virginia.
  - Battle of Fair Oaks – Both sides claim victory.
- June 4 – American Civil War: Confederate troops evacuate Fort Pillow on the Mississippi River, leaving the way clear for Union troops to take Memphis, Tennessee.
- June 5 – President Abraham Lincoln signs a bill into law allowing for the appointment of diplomats to Liberia and Haiti, the first time Congress had recognized a Black government.
- June 6 – American Civil War: First Battle of Memphis – Union forces capture Memphis, Tennessee, from the Confederates
- June 8 – American Civil War: Battle of Cross Keys – Confederate forces under General Stonewall Jackson save the Army of Northern Virginia from a Union assault on the James Peninsula led by General George B. McClellan.
- June 11 – Nathan Bedford Forrest's disabled brother John N. Forrest shoots a master's mate of the USS Carondelet at a brothel in Memphis, resulting in the expulsion, by the provost-marshal, of the city's prostitutes.
- June 12 – John Winter Robinson, Secretary of State of Kansas, is convicted and removed from office as the result of a bond scandal, becoming the first state executive officers to be impeached and removed from office in U.S. history.
- June 19 – Congress passes legislation outlawing slavery in U.S. territories.
- June 26 – American Civil War: Battle of Mechanicsville – Confederate General Robert E. Lee defeats Union General George McClellan in the first of the Seven Days' Battles.

=== July ===
- July – Taps first sounded in the Union Army.
- July 1
  - President Abraham Lincoln signs into law the Pacific Railway Acts, authorizing construction of the first transcontinental railroad.
  - The Bureau of Internal Revenue, forerunner of the Internal Revenue Service, is founded.
- July 2 – President Abraham Lincoln signs the Morrill Land Grant Act into law, creating land-grant colleges to teach agricultural and mechanical sciences across the U.S.
- July 8 – Theodore Timby is granted a U.S. patent for discharging guns in a revolving turret, using electricity.
- July 16 – American Civil War: David G. Farragut becomes the first United States Navy rear admiral.
- July 23 – American Civil War: Henry W. Halleck takes command of the Union Army.
- July 24 – Martin van Buren, 8th president of the United States, dies at Kinderhook, New York, aged 79.
- July 29 – American Civil War: Confederate spy Belle Boyd is arrested by Union forces after her lover betrays her.

=== August ===
- August 2 – American Civil War: Skirmish at Taberville, Missouri – Union forces force Confederate troops to march south, near Taberville.
- August 4 – 1862 Brooklyn riot: A mob consisting chiefly of Irish Americans targets a group of about 20 African American workers at a tobacco factory in the Cobble Hill neighborhood.
- August 5 – American Civil War: Battle of Baton Rouge – Along the Mississippi River near Baton Rouge, Louisiana, Confederate troops drive Union forces back into the city.
- August 6 – American Civil War: The Confederate ironclad CSS Arkansas is scuttled on the Mississippi River after suffering damage in a battle with USS Essex near Baton Rouge, Louisiana.
- August 9 – American Civil War: Battle of Cedar Mountain – Confederate General Stonewall Jackson narrowly defeats Union forces under General John Pope at Cedar Mountain, Virginia.
- August 14 – U. S. President Abraham Lincoln meets with a group of prominent African-Americans – the first time a president has done so. He suggests Black people should migrate to Africa or Central America, but this advice is rejected.
- August 17 – Dakota War: A Lakota (Sioux) uprising begins in Minnesota as Lakota Sioux attack white settlements along the Minnesota River. They are overwhelmed by the U.S. military six weeks later.
- August 19
  - Dakota War: During an uprising in Minnesota, Lakota warriors decide not to attack heavily defended Fort Ridgely and instead turn to the settlement of New Ulm, killing white settlers along the way.
  - Horace Greeley publishes an editorial, "The Prayer of Twenty Millions", in the New York Tribune, in which he urges President Abraham Lincoln to make abolition of slavery an official aim of the Union war effort.
- August 28–30 – American Civil War: Second Battle of Bull Run – Confederate forces inflict a crushing defeat on Union General John Pope.
- August 29 – Bureau of Engraving and Printing is formed and begins operation.

=== September ===
September 17: Battle of Antietam

- September 1 – American Civil War: Battle of Chantilly – Confederate General Robert E. Lee leads his forces in an attack on retreating Union troops in Chantilly, Virginia, driving them away.
- September 2 – American Civil War: President Abraham Lincoln reluctantly restores Union General George B. McClellan to full command after General John Pope's disastrous defeat at the Battle of Second Bull Run.
- September 5
  - American Civil War: In the Confederacy's first invasion of the North, General Robert E. Lee leads 55,000 men of the Army of Northern Virginia across the Potomac River at White's Ford near Leesburg, Virginia, into Maryland.
  - Confederate Alfred M. Rhett, a son of Fire-Eater Robert Barnwell Rhett, shoots and kills his commanding officer, William Ransom Calhoun, in a duel at Fort Sumter.
- September 17
  - American Civil War: Battle of Antietam – Union forces defeat Confederate troops at Sharpsburg, Maryland, in the bloodiest single-day battle in U.S. history, with over 22,000 casualties.
  - American Civil War: The Allegheny Arsenal explosion results in the single largest civilian disaster during the war, with 78 workers – mostly young women – being killed.
- September 19 – American Civil War: Battle of Iuka – Union troops under Major General William Rosecrans defeat a Confederate force commanded by Major General Sterling Price at Iuka, Mississippi.
- September 22 – American Civil War: Preliminary announcement of the Emancipation Proclamation by President Abraham Lincoln: From January 1, 1863, slaves in the Confederate States will be considered free.

=== October ===
- October 8 – American Civil War: Battle of Perryville – Union forces under General Don Carlos Buell halt the Confederate invasion of Kentucky by defeating troops led by General Braxton Bragg at Perryville, Kentucky.
- October 11 – American Civil War: In the aftermath of the Battle of Antietam, Confederate General J. E. B. Stuart and his men loot Chambersburg, Pennsylvania, during a raid into the North.
- October 24 – American Civil War: Tonkawa massacre – 300 members of the Confederacy-supporting Tonkawa tribe members taking refuge at the Wichita Agency (modern-day Fort Sill) are attacked by a large group of pro-Union Indians. An estimated 137 Tonkawas are killed, including their chief, Ha-shu-ka-na ("Can't Kill Him"). The completely-demoralized survivors flee to Fort Griffin in Texas in 1863. They return to Indian Territory in 1885 and settle near Fort Oakland (modern-day Tonkawa, Oklahoma).

=== November ===
- November 4 – Richard Jordan Gatling patents the Gatling gun.
- November 5
  - American Civil War: President Abraham Lincoln removes George B. McClellan as commander of the Union Army. Ambrose Burnside is assigned command of the Army of the Potomac.
  - Dakota War: In Minnesota, more than 300 Santee Sioux are found guilty of rape and murder of white settlers and are sentenced to hang.
- November 14 – American Civil War: Union President Abraham Lincoln approves General Ambrose Burnside's plan to capture the Confederate capital at Richmond, Virginia (this leads to a dramatic Union defeat at the Battle of Fredericksburg on December 13).
- November 28 – American Civil War: Battle of Cane Hill – Union troops led by General John Blunt push back Confederate forces commanded by General John Marmaduke into northwestern Arkansas' Boston Mountains.

=== December ===
- December 1 – In his State of the Union Address, President Abraham Lincoln reaffirms the necessity of ending slavery as affirmed in the Emancipation Proclamation.
- December 2 – The first U.S. Navy hospital ships enter service.
- December 12 – American Civil War: Yazoo Pass Expedition – Union ironclad gunboat USS Cairo is sunk by a remotely-detonated "torpedo" (naval mine) while clearing mines from the Yazoo River, the first armored ship sunk by mine.
- December 13 – American Civil War: Battle of Fredericksburg – The Union Army suffers massive casualties and abandons attempts to capture the Confederate capital of Richmond, Virginia.
- December 17 – General Order No. 11, expelling all Jews in his military district, is issued by General Ulysses S. Grant (it is rescinded a few weeks later).
- December 20 – American Civil War: Confederate Army Brigadier General Nathan Bedford Forrest occupies Trenton, Kentucky.
- December 26 – Dakota War: William D. Duly hangs 38 Dakota Sioux in Minnesota.
- December 26–29 – American Civil War: Battle of Chickasaw Bayou – Another victory for the Confederate Army, outnumbered 2 to 1, results in 6 times as many Union casualties, defeating several assaults coordinated by Union commander William T. Sherman.
- December 30 – USS Monitor sinks off Cape Hatteras, North Carolina.
- December 31 – American Civil War:
  - President Abraham Lincoln signs an act that admits West Virginia to the Union (thus dividing Virginia in two).
  - The Battle of Stones River opens near Murfreesboro, Tennessee.

=== Undated ===
- A smallpox epidemic breaks out in California.
- Stephen Foster writes "Willie Has Gone to War" (lyrics by George Cooper).

=== Ongoing ===
- American Civil War (1861–1865)

== Births ==
- January 9 – Carrie Clark Ward, silent film character actress (died 1926)
- January 10 – Harriet Mabel Spalding, litterateur and poet (died 1935)
- January 15 – Loie Fuller, dancer (died 1928)
- January 24 – Edith Wharton, fiction writer (died 1937)
- January 31 – Robert Ford, American outlaw, killer of Jesse James (died 1892)
- February 2
  - George Arthur Boeckling, businessman, president of Cedar Point Pleasure Company (died 1931)
  - Edward Nelson Woodruff, politician (died 1947)
- February 7 – Bernard Maybeck, Arts and Crafts architect (died 1957)
- February 18 – Charles M. Schwab, steel magnate (died 1939)
- March 2 – John Jay Chapman, writer (died 1923)
- March 13 – Jane Delano, founder of the American Red Cross Nursing Service (died 1919)
- March 21 – Elmer Samuel Hosmer, composer (died 1945)
- March 24 – Frank Weston Benson, Impressionist painter (died 1951)
- March 25 – William E. Johnson, leader of the Anti-Saloon League (died 1945)
- April 2 – Nicholas Murray Butler, president of Columbia University and winner of the Nobel Peace Prize (died 1947)
- April 11 – Charles Evans Hughes, lawyer and statesman (died 1948)
- April 26 – Edmund C. Tarbell, Impressionist painter (died 1938)
- May 6
  - Jeff Davis, 20th Governor of Arkansas from 1901 to 1907 and U.S. Senator from Arkansas from 1907 to 1913 (died 1913)
  - Oscar Underwood, U.S. Senator from Alabama from 1915 to 1927 (died 1929)
- May 18 – William Schmedtgen, illustrator (died 1936)
- May 27 – John Kendrick Bangs, author and satirist (died 1922)
- June 10 – Caroline Louise Dudley, later Mrs. Leslie Carter, stage and silent screen actress (died 1937)
- June 12 – James H. Brady, U.S. Senator from Idaho from 1913 to 1918 (died 1918)
- June 18 – Carolyn Wells, prolific novelist and poet (died 1942)
- July 15 – Frank Putnam Flint, U.S. Senator from California from 1905 to 1911 (died 1929)
- July 16 – Ida B. Wells, journalist, suffragist and anti-lynching crusader (died 1931)
- July 27 – Arthur Starr Eakle, mineralogist (died 1931)
- July 29 – Robert Reid, Impressionist painter (died 1928)
- August 11 – Carrie Jacobs-Bond, songwriter (died 1946)
- August 15 – Adam Emory Albright, painter (died 1957)
- August 16 – Amos Alonzo Stagg, football player (died 1965)
- August 30 – Lawrence C. Phipps, U.S. Senator from Colorado from 1919 to 1931 (died 1958)
- September 7 – Edgar Speyer, international financier and philanthropist (died 1932 in Germany)
- September 11
  - Hawley Harvey Crippen, medical practitioner and uxoricide (hanged 1910 in the United Kingdom)
  - O. Henry, born William Sydney Porter, short-story writer (died 1910)
- October 6
  - Joseph Weldon Bailey, U.S. Senator from 1901 to 1911 (died 1929)
  - Albert J. Beveridge, U.S. Senator from Indiana from 1899 to 1911 (died 1927)
- October 26 – Thomas J. Preston, Jr., Professor of Archeology at Princeton University, second husband of Frances Cleveland (widow of President Grover Cleveland) (died 1955)
- November 3 – Henry George, Jr., politician (died 1916)
- November 14 – George Washington Vanderbilt II, businessman (died 1914)
- November 19 – Billy Sunday, baseball player, evangelist and prohibitionist (died 1935)
- December 3 – Charles Grafly, sculptor (died 1929)
- December 5 – William Walker Atkinson, spiritual writer (died 1932)
- December 16 – John Fox, Jr., novelist and journalist (died 1919)

== Deaths ==
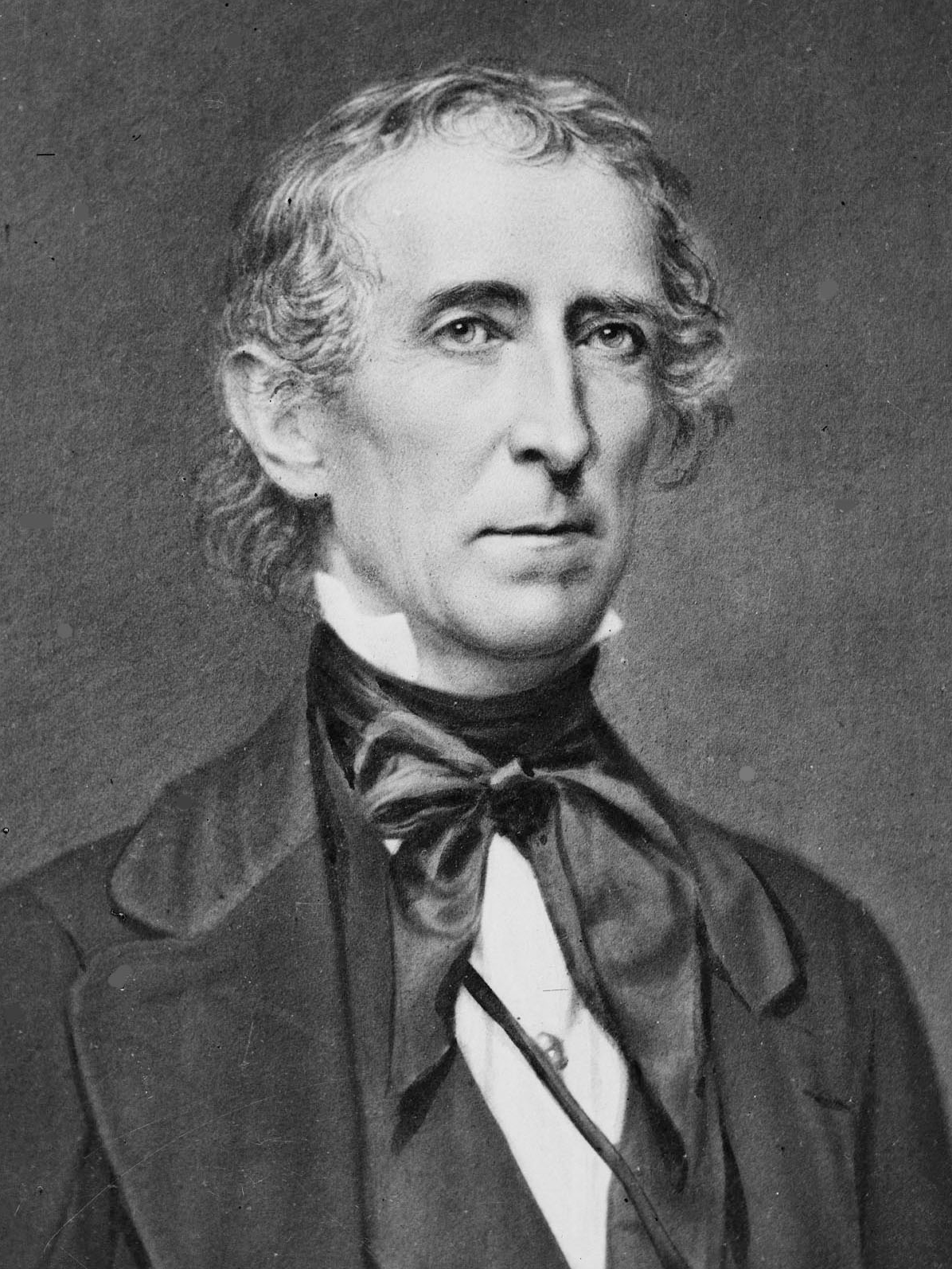
John Tyler

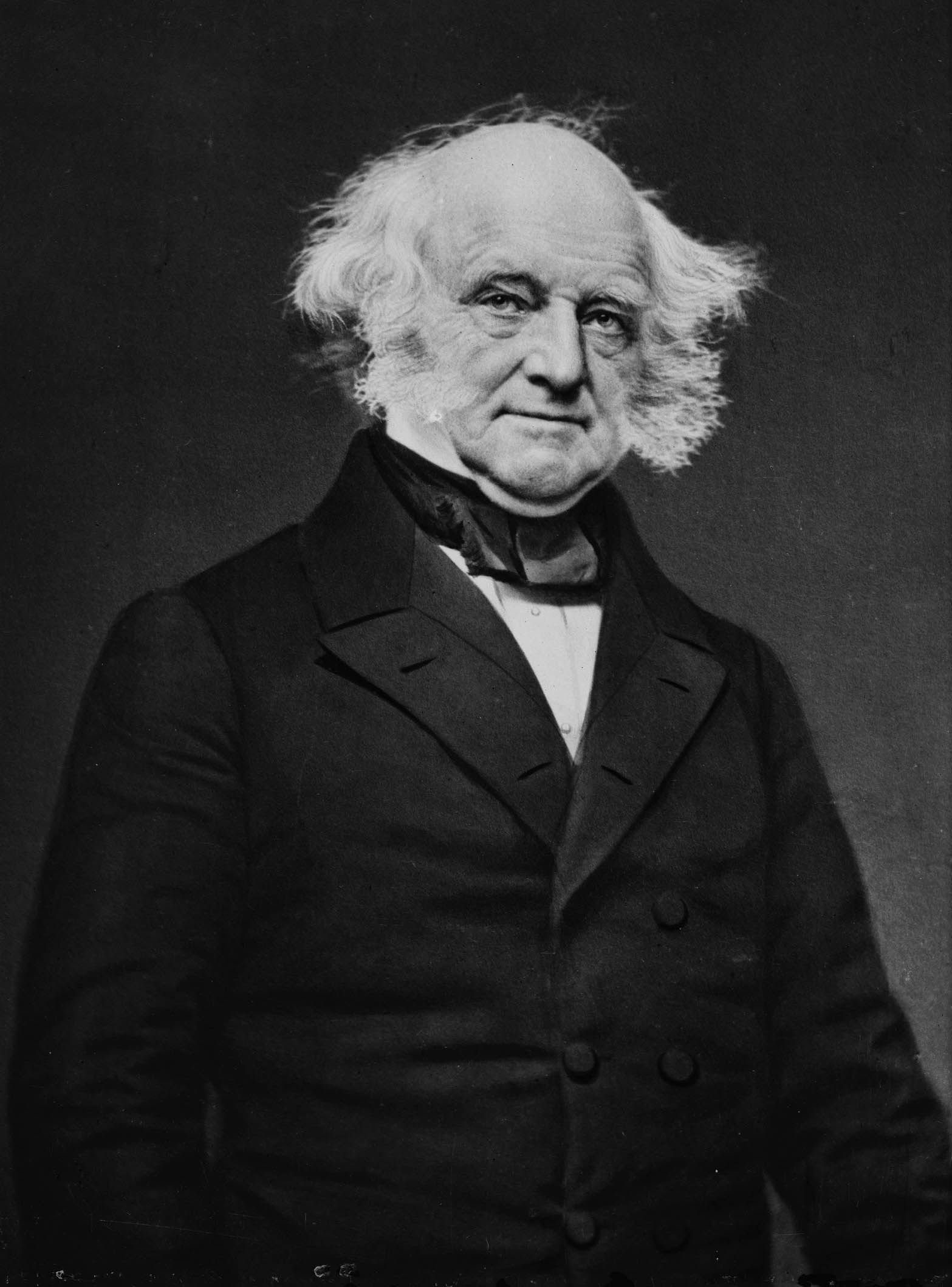
Martin Van Buren

- January 10 – Samuel Colt, inventor (born 1814)
- January 18 – John Tyler, tenth president of the United States from 1841 to 1845, tenth vice president of the United States from March to April 1841 (born 1790)
- February 11 – Luther V. Bell, psychiatric physician (born 1806)
- February 20 – William Wallace "Willie" Lincoln, third son of Abraham Lincoln and Mary Todd Lincoln (born 1850)
- March 2 – Frederick W. Lander, railroad surveyor, poet and Union general, died of pneumonia contracted on active service (born 1821)
- March 18 – Charles Bird King, portrait artist who notably painted Native American delegates visiting Washington, D.C. (born 1785)
- April 6
  - Albert Sidney Johnston, Confederate general, killed during Battle of Shiloh (born 1803)
  - Fitz James O'Brien, science fiction pioneer (born 1828 in Ireland)
- April 10 – W. H. L. Wallace, Union general, died of wounds received at Battle of Shiloh (born 1821)
- April 12 – Theodore Frelinghuysen, running mate of Henry Clay in 1844 (born 1787)
- April 19 – Louis P. Harvey, Governor of Wisconsin (born 1820)
- May 6 – Henry David Thoreau, transcendentalist author and philosopher (born 1817)
- May 21
  - Edwin Pearce Christy, founder of Christy's Minstrels, suicide by defenestration (born 1815)
  - John Drew Sr., actor, died in domestic accident (born 1827 in Ireland)
- July 24 – Martin Van Buren, eighth president of the United States from 1837 to 1841, eighth vice president of the United States from 1833 to 1837 (born 1782)
- August 30 – John Hugh Means, 64th governor of South Carolina from 1850 to 1852 (born 1812)
- September 1 – Philip Kearny, United States Army officer (born 1815)
- September 18? – Septimus Norris, steam locomotive designer (born 1818)
- November 17 – Mary Whitwell Hale, teacher, school founder, and hymnwriter (born 1810)
- December 13 – Thomas Reade Rootes Cobb, Confederate general, killed during Battle of Fredericksburg (born 1823)
- December 18 – Barbara Fritchie, Civil War patriot (born 1766)

== See also ==
- Timeline of United States history (1860–1899)
