= 1898 in the United States =

- Decades: 1870s; 1880s; 1890s; 1900s; 1910s
- See also: History of the United States (1865–1918); Timeline of United States history (1860–1899); List of years in the United States

Events from the year 1898 in the United States.

== Incumbents ==
=== Federal government ===
- President: William McKinley (R-Ohio)
- Vice President: Garret Hobart (R-New Jersey)
- Chief Justice: Melville Fuller (Illinois)
- Speaker of the House of Representatives: Thomas Brackett Reed (R-Maine)
- Congress: 55th

==== State governments ====
Governors and lieutenant governors

=== Governors ===
- Governor of Alabama: Joseph F. Johnston (Democratic)
- Governor of Arkansas: Daniel Webster Jones (Democratic)
- Governor of California: James Budd (Democratic)
- Governor of Colorado: Alva Adams (Democratic)
- Governor of Connecticut: Lorrin A. Cooke (Republican)
- Governor of Delaware: Ebe W. Tunnell (Democratic)
- Governor of Florida: William D. Bloxham (Democratic)
- Governor of Georgia: William Yates Atkinson (Democratic) (until October 29), Allen D. Candler (Democratic) (starting October 29)
- Governor of Idaho: Frank Steunenberg (Democratic)
- Governor of Illinois: John Riley Tanner (Republican)
- Governor of Indiana: James A. Mount (Republican)
- Governor of Iowa: Francis M. Drake (Republican) (until January 13), Leslie M. Shaw (Republican) (starting January 13)
- Governor of Kansas: John W. Leedy (Populist)
- Governor of Kentucky: William O. Bradley (Republican)
- Governor of Louisiana: Murphy James Foster, Sr. (Democratic)
- Governor of Maine: Llewellyn Powers (Republican)
- Governor of Maryland: Lloyd Lowndes, Jr. (Republican)
- Governor of Massachusetts: Roger Wolcott (Republican)
- Governor of Michigan: Hazen S. Pingree (Republican)
- Governor of Minnesota: David M. Clough (Republican)
- Governor of Mississippi: Anselm J. McLaurin (Democratic)
- Governor of Missouri: Lon Vest Stephens (Democratic)
- Governor of Montana: Robert Burns Smith (Democratic)
- Governor of Nebraska: Silas A. Holcomb (Democratic)
- Governor of Nevada: Reinhold Sadler (Silver)
- Governor of New Hampshire: George A. Ramsdell (Republican)
- Governor of New Jersey:
  - until January 31: John W. Griggs (Republican)
  - January 31-October 18: Foster MacGowan Voorhees (Republican)
  - starting October 18: David Ogden Watkins (Republican)
- Governor of New York: Frank S. Black (Republican) (until end of December 31)
- Governor of North Carolina: Daniel Lindsay Russell (Republican)
- Governor of North Dakota: Frank A. Briggs (Republican) (until August 9), Joseph M. Devine (Republican) (starting August 9)
- Governor of Ohio: Asa S. Bushnell (Republican)
- Governor of Oregon: William Paine Lord (Republican)
- Governor of Pennsylvania: Daniel H. Hastings (Republican)
- Governor of Rhode Island: Elisha Dyer, Jr. (Republican)
- Governor of South Carolina: William Haselden Ellerbe (Democratic)
- Governor of South Dakota: Andrew E. Lee (Populist)
- Governor of Tennessee: Robert Love Taylor (Democratic)
- Governor of Texas: Charles A. Culberson (Democratic)
- Governor of Utah: Heber Manning Wells (Republican)
- Governor of Vermont: Josiah Grout (Republican) (until October 6), Edward Curtis Smith (Republican) (starting October 6)
- Governor of Virginia: Charles Triplett O'Ferrall (Democratic) (until January 1), James Hoge Tyler (Democratic) (starting January 1)
- Governor of Washington: John Rankin Rogers (Populist)/(Democratic)
- Governor of West Virginia: George W. Atkinson (Republican)
- Governor of Wisconsin: Edward Scofield (Republican)
- Governor of Wyoming: William A. Richards (Republican)

=== Lieutenant governors ===
- Lieutenant Governor of California: William T. Jeter (Democratic)
- Lieutenant Governor of Colorado: Jared L. Brush (Republican)
- Lieutenant Governor of Connecticut: James D. Dewell (Republican)
- Lieutenant Governor of Idaho: George F. Moore (Democratic)
- Lieutenant Governor of Illinois: William Northcott (Republican)
- Lieutenant Governor of Indiana: William S. Haggard (Republican)
- Lieutenant Governor of Iowa: Matt Parrott (Republican) (until January 13), James C. Milliman (Republican) (starting January 13)
- Lieutenant Governor of Kansas: Alexander M. Harvey (Populist)
- Lieutenant Governor of Kentucky: William Jackson Worthington (Republican)
- Lieutenant Governor of Louisiana: Robert H. Snyder (Democratic)
- Lieutenant Governor of Massachusetts: Winthrop M. Crane (political party unknown)
- Lieutenant Governor of Michigan: Thomas B. Dunstan (Republican)
- Lieutenant Governor of Minnesota: John L. Gibbs (Republican)
- Lieutenant Governor of Mississippi: J. H. Jones (Democratic)
- Lieutenant Governor of Missouri: August Bolte (Democratic)
- Lieutenant Governor of Montana: Archibald E. Spriggs (political party unknown)
- Lieutenant Governor of Nebraska: James E. Harris (Democratic)
- Lieutenant Governor of Nevada: James R. Judge (political party unknown)
- Lieutenant Governor of New York: Timothy L. Woodruff (Republican)
- Lieutenant Governor of North Carolina: Charles A. Reynolds (Republican)
- Lieutenant Governor of North Dakota: Joseph M. Devine (Republican) (until August 9), vacant (starting August 9)
- Lieutenant Governor of Ohio: Asa W. Jones (Republican)
- Lieutenant Governor of Pennsylvania: Walter Lyon (Republican)
- Lieutenant Governor of Rhode Island: Aram J. Pothier (Republican) (until month and day unknown), William Gregory (Republican) (starting month and day unknown)
- Lieutenant Governor of South Carolina: Miles Benjamin McSweeney (Democratic)
- Lieutenant Governor of South Dakota: Daniel T. Hindman (Republican)
- Lieutenant Governor of Tennessee: John Thompson (Democratic)
- Lieutenant Governor of Texas: George Taylor Jester (Democratic)
- Lieutenant Governor of Vermont: Nelson W. Fisk (Republican) (until October 6), Henry C. Bates (Republican) (starting October 6)
- Lieutenant Governor of Virginia: Robert Craig Kent (Democratic) (until month and day unknown), Edward Echols (Democratic) (starting month and day unknown)
- Lieutenant Governor of Washington: Thurston Daniels (Populist)
- Lieutenant Governor of Wisconsin: Emil Baensch (Republican)

== Events ==
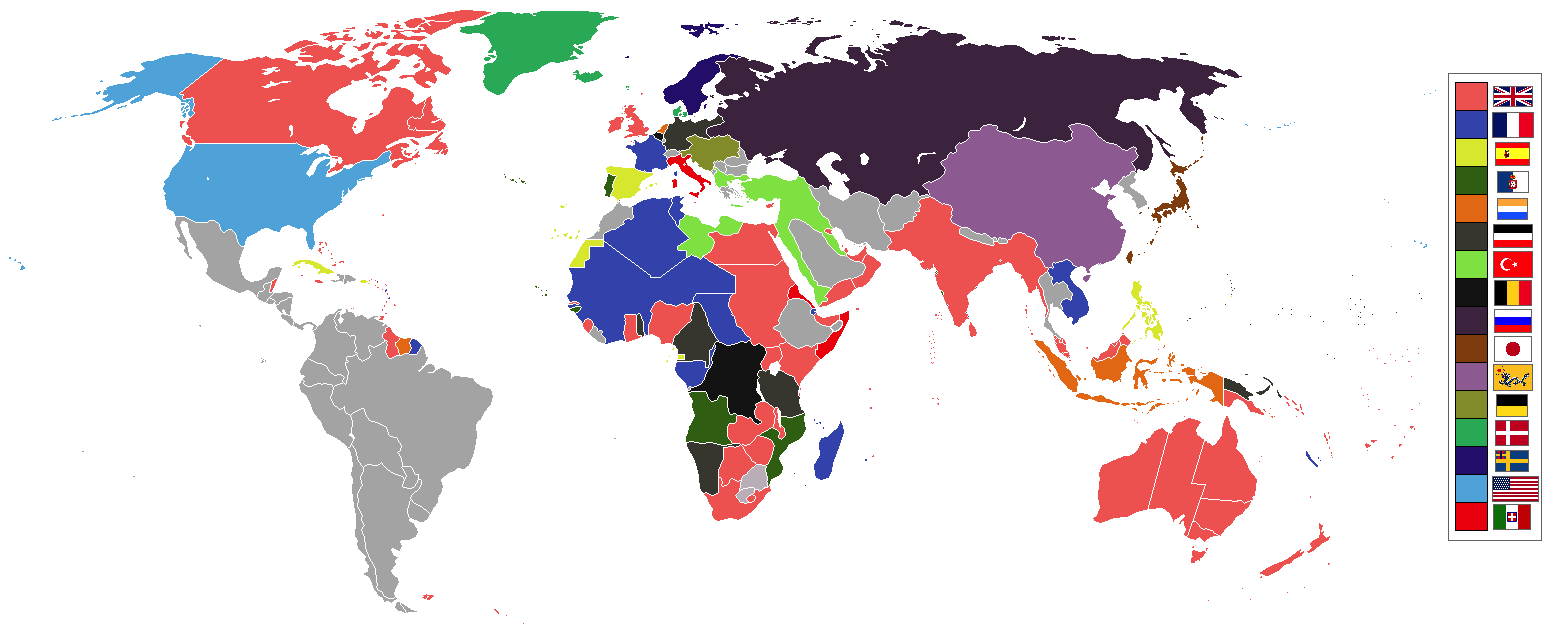
The world map of 1898.

=== January–March ===
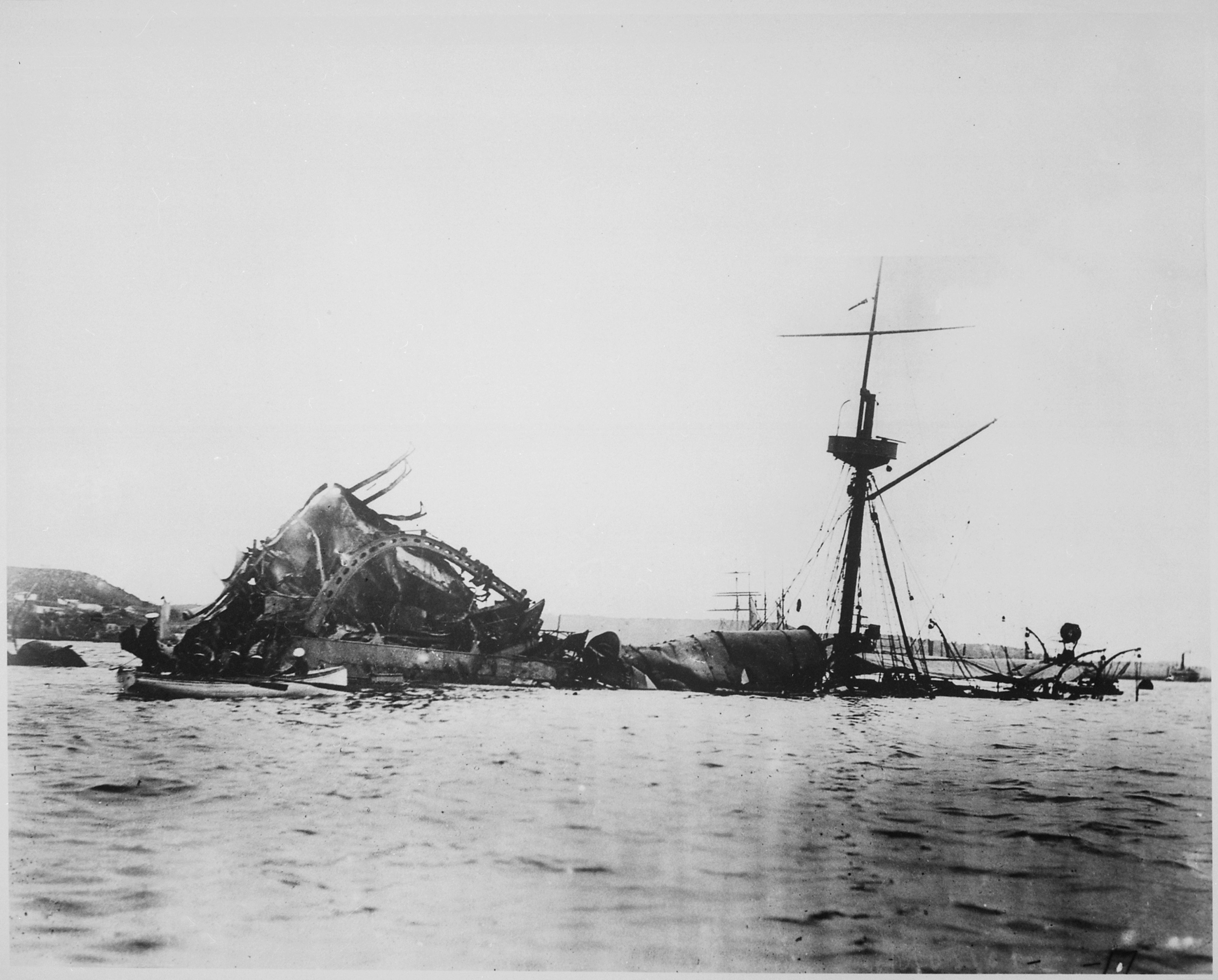
February 15: USS Maine explodes

- January 1 – New York City annexes land from surrounding counties, creating the City of Greater New York. The city is geographically divided into five boroughs: Manhattan, Brooklyn, Queens, The Bronx, and Staten Island.
- January 8 – Seminole burning: Lynching by burning of two Seminole boys near Maud, Oklahoma; 6 of the lynch mob are convicted and imprisoned, the first successful prosecution of lynching in the Southwest.
- February 15 – USS Maine explodes and sinks in Havana harbor, Cuba, killing 266 men. Popular opinion blames Spain and helps precipitate the Spanish–American War.
- February 22 – Naoum Mokarzel establishes Al-Hoda which will become the longest-running Arabic newspaper in the U.S.
- March 24 – Robert Allison of Port Carbon, Pennsylvania becomes the first person to buy an American-built automobile when he buys a Winton automobile that has been advertised in Scientific American.
- March 28 – After an investigation, the U.S. Navy publicly concludes that USS Maine was sunk by a mine, further pushing sentiment towards war.
- March 30 – The 5.8–6.4 M_{w} Mare Island earthquake shook the San Francisco Bay Area with a maximum Mercalli intensity of VIII (Severe), causing $350,000 in damage.

=== April–June ===
- April 5 – Annie Oakley promotes the service of women in combat situations with the United States military. On this day, she writes a letter to President McKinley "offering the government the services of a company of 50 'lady sharpshooters' who would provide their own arms and ammunition should war break out with Spain." In the history of women in the military, there are records of female U.S. Revolutionary and Civil War soldiers who enlisted using male pseudonyms, but Oakley's letter represents possibly the earliest political move towards women's rights for combat service in the United States military.
- April 20 – President William McKinley signs a Joint Resolution with Cuba and a declaration of War against Spain, beginning the Spanish–American War. The declaration is accepted five days later.
- April 21 – Spanish–American War: The United States Navy begins a blockade of Cuban ports and USS Nashville captures a Spanish merchant ship.
- April 25 – Spanish–American War: The United States declares war on Spain; the U.S. Congress announces that a state of war has existed since April 21 (later backdating this one more day to April 20).
- April 29 – Union Razor Company, which today is known as KA-BAR Knives, founded in Tidioute, Pennsylvania.
- May 1 – Spanish–American War – Battle of Manila Bay: Commodore Dewey destroys the Spanish squadron. The first battle of the war, as well as the first battle in the Philippines Campaign.
- May 10 – Prescott National Forest is established.
- May 12 – Bombardment of San Juan, the first major battle of the Puerto Rico Campaign during the Spanish–American War.
- June 1 – The Trans-Mississippi Exposition World's Fair opens in Omaha, Nebraska.

=== July–September ===
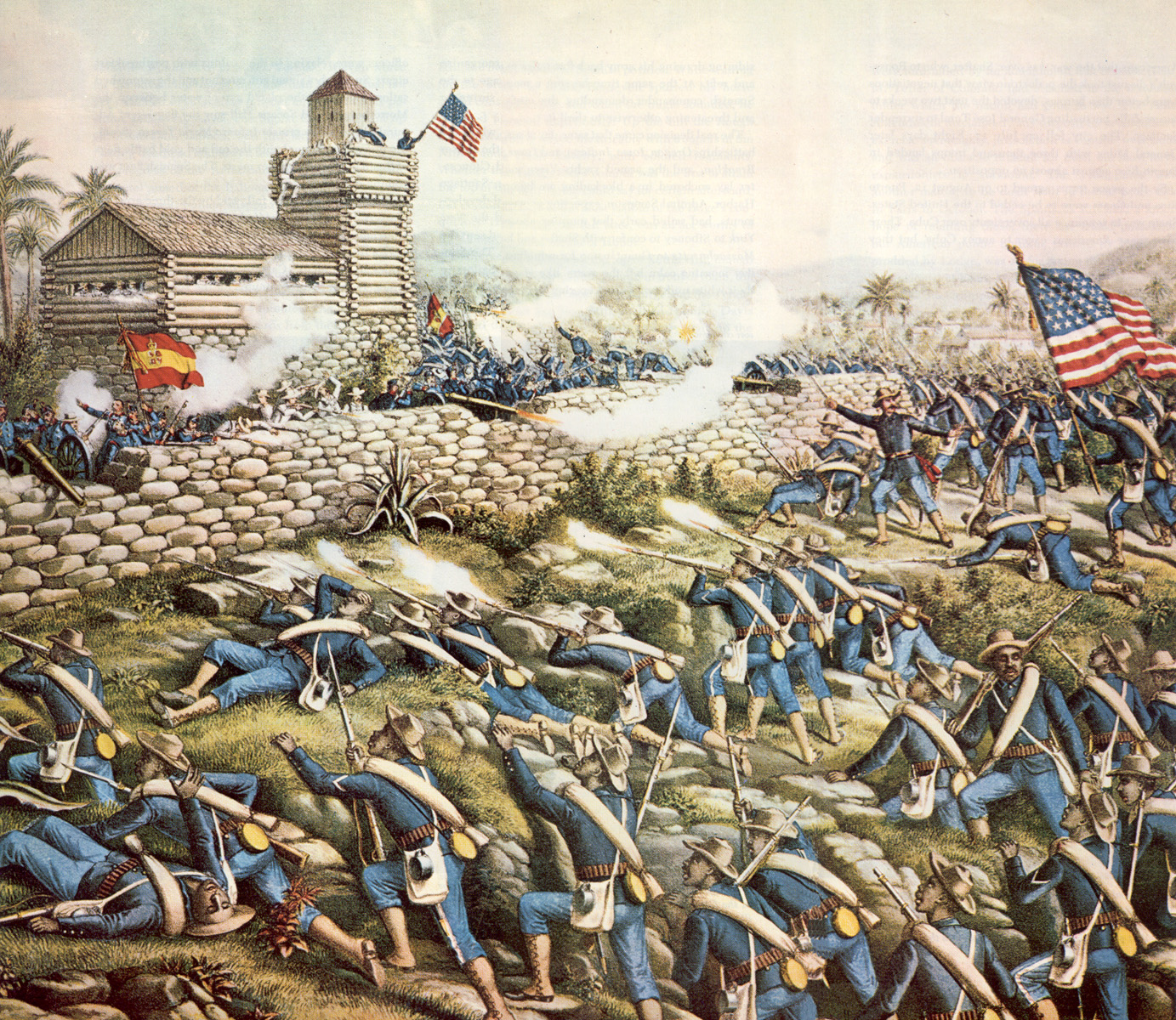
July 1: Battle of San Juan Hill

- July 1 – Spanish–American War: Battle of San Juan Hill – American forces capture the San Juan Heights near Santiago de Cuba. Theodore Roosevelt memorably leads the charge of the Rough Riders.
- July 3
  - Spanish–American War: Battle of Santiago de Cuba – The United States Navy destroys the Spanish Navy's Caribbean Squadron.
  - Joshua Slocum completes a 3-year solo circumnavigation of the world.
- July 7 – The United States annexes the Hawaiian Islands.
- July 17 – Spanish–American War: – Battle of Santiago Bay: Troops under United States General William R. Shafter take the city of Santiago de Cuba from the Spanish.
- July 25 – Spanish–American War: The United States invasion of Puerto Rico begins with a landing at Guánica Bay.
- August 1 – Joseph F. Johnston is reelected the 30th governor of Alabama defeating Gilbert B. Dean.
- August 13 – Spanish–American War: Hostilities end between American and Spanish forces in Cuba.

=== October–December ===
- October 3 – Battle of Sugar Point: Ojibwe tribesmen defeat U.S. government troops in northern Minnesota.
- October 6 – The Phi Mu Alpha Sinfonia fraternity (then the Sinfonia Club) is founded at the New England Conservatory in Boston.
- November 10 – The Wilmington massacre of 1898: A coup d'état by white supremacists.
- November 26 – A 2-day blizzard known as the Portland Gale piles snow in Boston, Massachusetts, and severely impacts the Massachusetts fishing industry and several coastal New England towns.
- December 10 – The Treaty of Paris is signed, ending the Spanish–American War.
- December 23 – Guam transferred to the United States Navy control on December 23, 1898, by Executive Order 108-A from President William McKinley

=== Undated ===
- H. W. Perlman, American piano manufacturer is founded.
- Wakita is founded in the Cherokee Strip, Oklahoma.
- As a result of the merger of several small oil companies, John D. Rockefeller's Standard Oil Company controls 84% of the United States's oil and most American pipelines.
- Henry Adams Consulting Engineers founded by Henry Adams in Baltimore, Maryland.

=== Ongoing ===
- Gay Nineties (1890–1899)
- Progressive Era (1890s–1920s)
- Lochner era (c. 1897–c. 1937)

== Births ==
- January 1 – Tony DeMarco, dancer (died 1965)
- January 7 – Robert LeGendre, pentathlete and dentist (died 1931)
- January 18 – Margaret Irving, actress (died 1988)
- January 23 – Randolph Scott, film actor (died 1987)
- February 2 – Billy Costello, voice actor, the original voice of Popeye (died 1971)
- February 3 – Lil Hardin Armstrong, African American jazz musician (died 1971)
- February 5 – Sidney Fields, actor (died 1975)
- February 6 – Melvin B. Tolson, African American Modernist poet, educator, columnist, trade unionist and politician (died 1966)
- February 10 – Robert Keith, actor (died 1966)
- February 15 – Bud Geary, actor (died 1946)
- February 26 – Blue Washington, actor and Negro league baseball player (died 1970)
- February 27 – Otto Hulett, actor (died 1983)
- March 3 – Thomas R. Underwood, U.S. Senator from Kentucky from 1951 to 1952 (died 1956)
- March 4 – Robert Schmertz, folk musician and architect (died 1975)
- March 10 – Cy Kendall, actor (died 1953)
- March 15 – Gardner Dow, college football player (died 1919)
- April 1 – William James Sidis, child prodigy (died 1944)
- April 3 – George Jessel, comedic entertainer (died 1981)
- April 9 – Paul Robeson, African American bass singer and civil rights activist (died 1976)
- April 15 – Marian Driscoll Jordan, actress (died 1961)
- April 20 – Sidney Lanfield, film director (died 1972)
- May 5
  - Elsie Eaves, civil engineer (died 1983)
  - Blind Willie McTell, African American blues singer/guitarist (died 1959)
- May 14 – Betty Farrington, actress (died 1989)
- May 23 – Daisy Bacon, magazine editor and writer (died 1986)
- May 27 – Lee Garmes, cinematographer (died 1978)
- June 6 – Walter Abel, actor (died 1987)
- June 18 – Dink Trout, actor (died 1950)
- June 19 – James Joseph Sweeney, first Catholic Bishop of Honolulu from 1941 (died 1968)
- June 21 – Donald C. Peattie, botanist and author (died 1964)
- June 25 – Buddy Roosevelt, actor and stunt performer (died 1973)
- June 28 – Louis King, film director (died 1962)
- July 1 – Charles Hartmann, jazz trombonist (died 1982)
- July 2
  - George Folsey, cinematographer (died 1988)
  - Anthony McAuliffe, general (died 1975)
- July 4 – Johnny Lee, singer, dancer, and actor (died 1965)
- July 5 – Richard P. Condie, conductor of the Mormon Tabernacle Choir (died 1985)
- July 6 – Bill Amos, college football player and coach (died 1987)
- July 9 – Al Bedner, American football player (died 1988)
- July 10 – Theodore Miller Edison, businessman, inventor, and environmentalist (died 1992)
- July 14
  - Happy Chandler, U.S. Senator from Kentucky from 1955 to 1959 (died 1991)
  - John Twist, screenwriter (died 1976)
- July 17
  - Berenice Abbott, photographer (died 1991)
  - George Robert Vincent, sound recording pioneer (died 1985)
- July 21 – Sara Carter, country music singer, musician, and songwriter (died 1979)
- July 22
  - Stephen Vincent Benét, poet and fiction writer (died 1943)
  - Alexander Calder, sculptor and artist (died 1976)
- July 23 – Walter L. Morgan, banker (died 1998)
- July 28 – Lawrence Gray, actor (died 1970)
- July 31 – Ken Harris, animator (died 1982)
- August 2 – Glenn Tryon, actor, screenwriter, and film director (died 1970)
- August 5 – Lewis R. Foster, film director and screenwriter (died 1974)
- August 12 – Kenneth Hawks, film director (died 1930)
- August 17 – Dewey Robinson, actor (died 1950)
- August 25 – Van Nest Polglase, art director, design department head at RKO Pictures (died 1968)
- August 26 – Peggy Guggenheim, art collector (died 1979 in Italy)
- August 28 – Malcolm Cowley, novelist, poet, literary critic and journalist (died 1989)
- September 8 – Queenie Smith, actress (died 1978)
- September 9 – Styles Bridges, U.S. Senator from New Hampshire from 1937 to 1961 (died 1961)
- September 10
  - Katharine Alexander, actress (died 1981)
  - Waldo Semon, inventor (died 1999)
- September 16- Helen Palmer writer and first wife of Dr.Seuss (died 1967)
- September 26 – George Gershwin, composer (died 1937)
- October 3 – Morgan Farley, actor (died 1988)
- October 7 – Joe Giard, baseball player (died 1956)
- October 16 – William O. Douglas, Associate Justice of the Supreme Court of the United States from 1939 to 1975 (died 1980)
- November 4 – Joe Dougherty, first voice of Porky Pig (died 1978)
- November 13 – Wallace F. Bennett, U.S. Senator from Utah from 1951 to 1974 (died 1993)
- November 16 – Warren Sturgis McCulloch, neurophysiologist and cybernetician (died 1969)
- November 17 – William A. Blakley, U.S. Senator from Texas in 1961 (died 1976)
- November 29 – Rod La Rocque, actor (died 1969)
- December 3 – Monte Collins, actor and screenwriter (died 1951)
- December 5 – Grace Moore, operatic soprano (died 1947 in aviation accident)
- December 9
  - Emmett Kelly, clown (died 1979)
  - Clarine Seymour, actress (died 1920)
- December 14 – Lillian Randolph, African American actress and singer (died 1980)
- December 24 – Baby Dodds, African American jazz drummer (died 1959)
- December 27 – Hilda Vaughn, actress (died 1957)

== Deaths ==
- January 3 – Lawrence Sullivan Ross, Confederate brigadier general, Texas governor and president of Texas A&M University (born 1838)
- January 7 – Joseph O'Dwyer, physician (born 1841)
- February 17 – Frances Willard, educator, temperance reformer and women's suffragist (born 1839)
- March 6 – Hugh J. Jewett, politician and president of the Erie Railroad from 1874 to 1884 (born 1817).
- March 17 – Blanche Bruce, U.S. Senator from Mississippi from 1875 to 1881 (born 1841)
- March 18 – Matilda Joslyn Gage, feminist (born 1826)
- May 22 – Edward Bellamy, novelist (born 1850)
- July 8 – Soapy Smith, con artist and gangster (born 1860)
- July 11 – Omar D. Conger, U.S. Senator from Michigan from 1881 to 1887 (born 1818)
- July 17 – John Stuart Williams, U.S. Senator from Kentucky from 1879 to 1885 (born 1818)
- September 2 – Wilford Woodruff, fourth president of the Church of Jesus Christ of Latter-day Saints (born 1807)
- September 14 – William Seward Burroughs I, inventor of the adding machine (born 1855)
- September 21 – William W. Eaton, U.S. Senator from Connecticut from 1875 to 1881 (born 1816)
- September 26 – Fanny Davenport, actress (born 1850)
- September 28 – Thomas F. Bayard, U.S. Senator from Delaware from 1869 to 1885 and Secretary of State from 1885 to 1889 (born 1828)
- October 12 – John M. Forbes, merchant, philanthropist and abolitionist, president of the Michigan Central and Chicago, Burlington and Quincy Railroads (born 1813)
- October 13 – Christian Dancel, German-born inventor (b. 1847)
- October 31 – Joseph R. West, U.S. Senator from Louisiana from 1871 to 1877 (born 1822)
- November 8 – Robert Franklin Armfield, U.S. Representative from North Carolina (born 1829)
- November 19 – Don Carlos Buell, United States Army officer who fought in the Seminole War, the Mexican–American War and the American Civil War (born 1818)
- December 15 – Calvin S. Brice, U.S. Senator from Ohio from 1891 to 1897 (born 1845)
- December 18 – Thomas W. Osborn, U.S. Senator from Florida from 1868 to 1873 (born 1833)

== See also ==
- List of American films of the 1890s
- Timeline of United States history (1860–1899)
