= 1817 in the United States =

- Decades: 1790s; 1800s; 1810s; 1820s; 1830s
- See also: History of the United States (1789–1849); Timeline of United States history (1790–1819); List of years in the United States

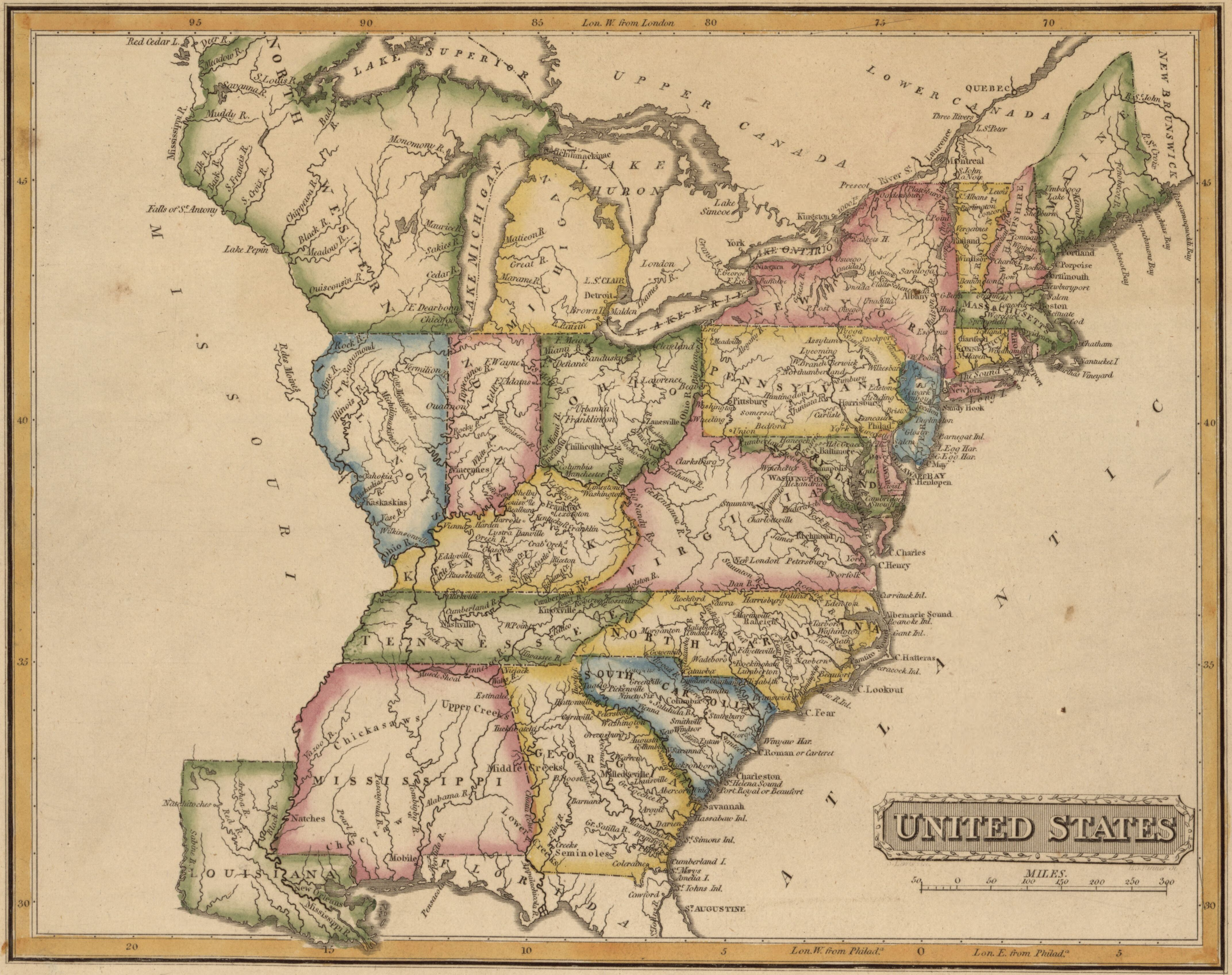
1817 atlas map of the United States

Events from the year 1817 in the United States.

== Incumbents ==
=== Federal government ===
- President:

James Madison (DR-Virginia) (until March 4)
James Monroe (DR-Virginia) (starting March 4)

- Vice President:

vacant (until March 4)
Daniel D. Tompkins (DR-New York) (starting March 4)

- Chief Justice: John Marshall (Virginia)
- Speaker of the House of Representatives: Henry Clay (DR-Kentucky)
- Congress: 14th (until March 4), 15th (starting March 4)

==== State governments ====
Governors and lieutenant governors

=== Governors ===
- Governor of Connecticut: John Cotton Smith (Federalist) (until May 8), Oliver Wolcott Jr. (Toleration) (starting May 8)
- Governor of Delaware: Daniel Rodney (Federalist) (until January 21), John Clark (Federalist) (starting January 21)
- Governor of Georgia: David Brydie Mitchell (Democratic-Republican) (until March 4), William Rabun (Democratic-Republican) (starting March 4)
- Governor of Indiana: Jonathan Jennings (Democratic-Republican)
- Governor of Kentucky: Gabriel Slaughter (Democratic-Republican)
- Governor of Louisiana: Jacques Villeré (Democratic-Republican)
- Governor of Maryland: Charles Carnan Ridgely (Federalist)
- Governor of Massachusetts: John Brooks (Federalist)
- Governor of Mississippi: David Holmes (Democratic-Republican) (starting December 10)
- Governor of New Hampshire: William Plumer (Democratic-Republican)
- Governor of New Jersey: Mahlon Dickerson (Democratic-Republican) (until February 1), Isaac Halstead Williamson (Democratic-Republican) (starting February 1)
- Governor of New York:
  - until February 24: Daniel D. Tompkins (Democratic-Republican)
  - February 24-June 30: John Tayler (Democratic-Republican)
  - starting July 1: DeWitt Clinton (Democratic-Republican)
- Governor of North Carolina: William Miller (Democratic-Republican) (until December 6), John Branch (Democratic-Republican) (starting December 6)
- Governor of Ohio: Thomas Worthington (Democratic-Republican)
- Governor of Pennsylvania: Simon Snyder (Democratic-Republican) (until December 16), William Findlay (Democratic-Republican) (starting December 16)
- Governor of Rhode Island: William Jones (Federalist) (until May 7), Nehemiah R. Knight (Democratic-Republican) (starting May 7)
- Governor of South Carolina: Andrew Pickens (Democratic-Republican)
- Governor of Tennessee: Joseph McMinn (Democratic-Republican)
- Governor of Vermont: Jonas Galusha (Democratic-Republican)
- Governor of Virginia: James Patton Preston (Democratic-Republican)

=== Lieutenant governors ===
- Lieutenant Governor of Connecticut: Jonathan Ingersoll (Democratic-Republican)
- Lieutenant Governor of Indiana: Christopher Harrison (Democratic-Republican)
- Lieutenant Governor of Kentucky: vacant
- Lieutenant Governor of Massachusetts: William Phillips Jr. (political party unknown)
- Lieutenant Governor of Mississippi: Duncan Stewart (no political party) (starting month and day unknown)
- Lieutenant Governor of New York:
  - until month and day unknown: John Tayler (Democratic-Republican)
  - month and day unknown: Philetus Swift (Democratic-Republican)
  - starting month and day unknown: John Tayler (Democratic-Republican)
- Lieutenant Governor of Rhode Island: Jeremiah Thurston (political party unknown) (until May 7), Edward Wilcox (political party unknown) (starting May 7)
- Lieutenant Governor of South Carolina: John A. Cuthbert (Democratic-Republican)
- Lieutenant Governor of Vermont: Paul Brigham (Democratic-Republican)

== Events ==
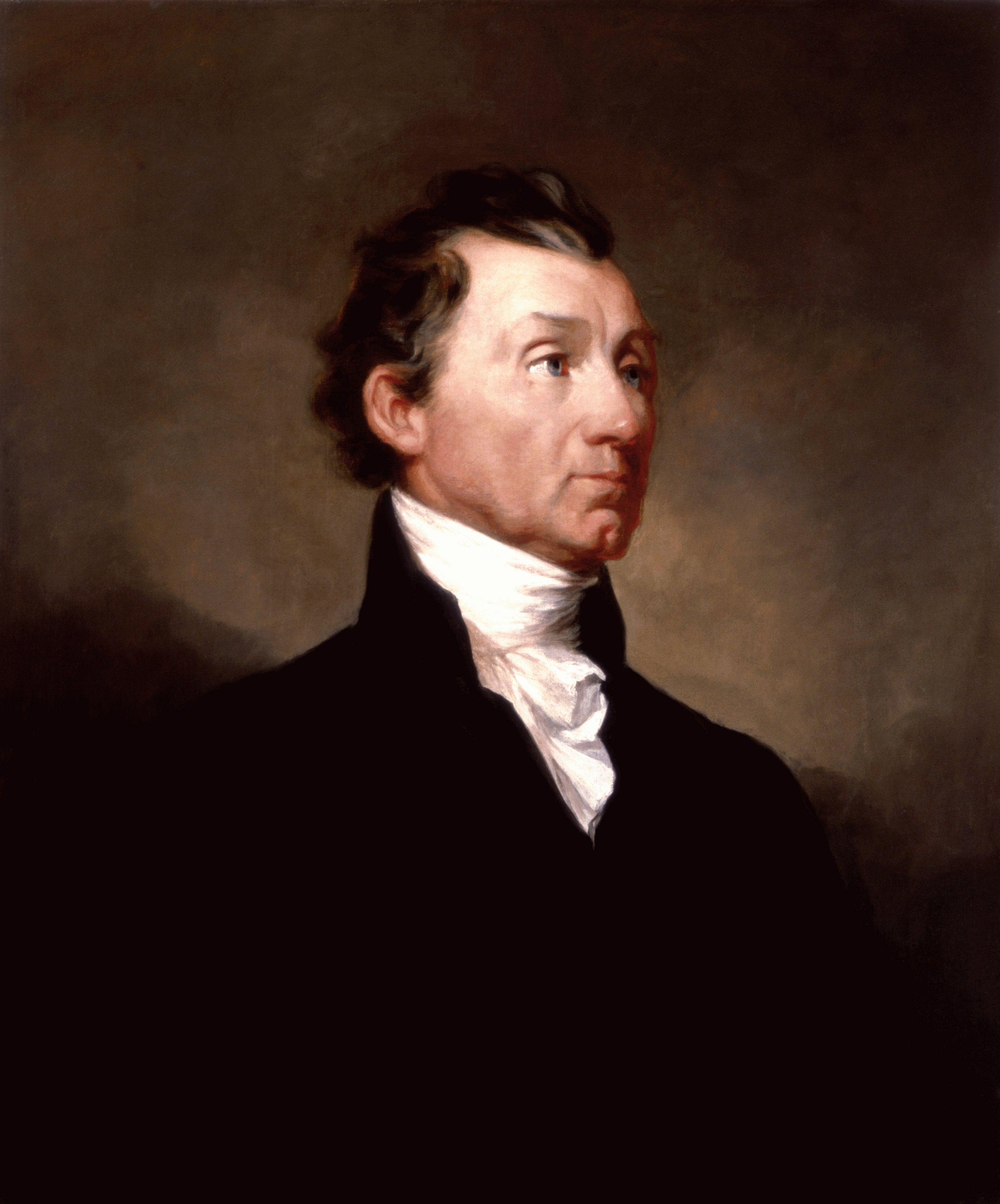
March 4: James Monroe becomes the fifth U.S. president

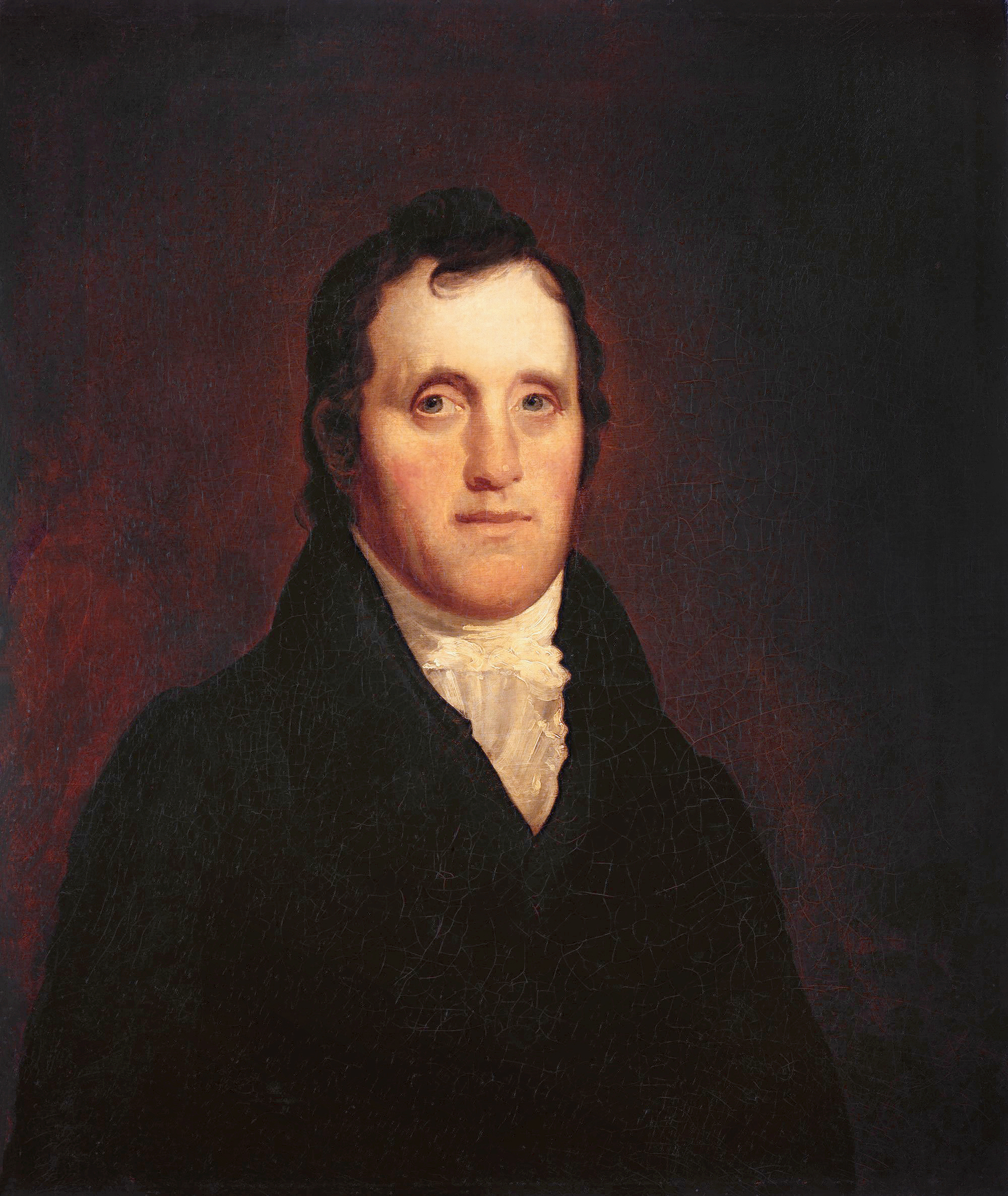
Daniel D. Tompkins becomes the sixth U.S. vice president

=== January–March ===
- February 7 – Baltimore becomes the first U.S. city with public street gas lighting.
- March 3
  - President James Madison vetoes John C. Calhoun's Bonus Bill.
  - U.S. Congress passes law to split the Mississippi Territory, after Mississippi drafts a constitution, creating the Alabama Territory effective in August.
- March 4 – James Monroe is sworn in as the fifth president of the United States, and Daniel D. Tompkins is sworn in as the sixth vice president.
- March 6 – William W. Bibb is appointed by James Monroe as the only governor of the Alabama Territory.

=== April–June ===
- April 15 – The first American school for the deaf opens in Hartford, Connecticut.
- April 29 – The Rush–Bagot Treaty, between the U.S. and the United Kingdom, is signed.
- May – The General Convention of the Episcopal Church founds the General Theological Seminary while meeting in New York City.
- June 18 – Henry Perry, a former member of the Republican Army of the North, is defeated near Coleto Creek after leading a force to capture Presidio La Bahía.

=== July–September ===
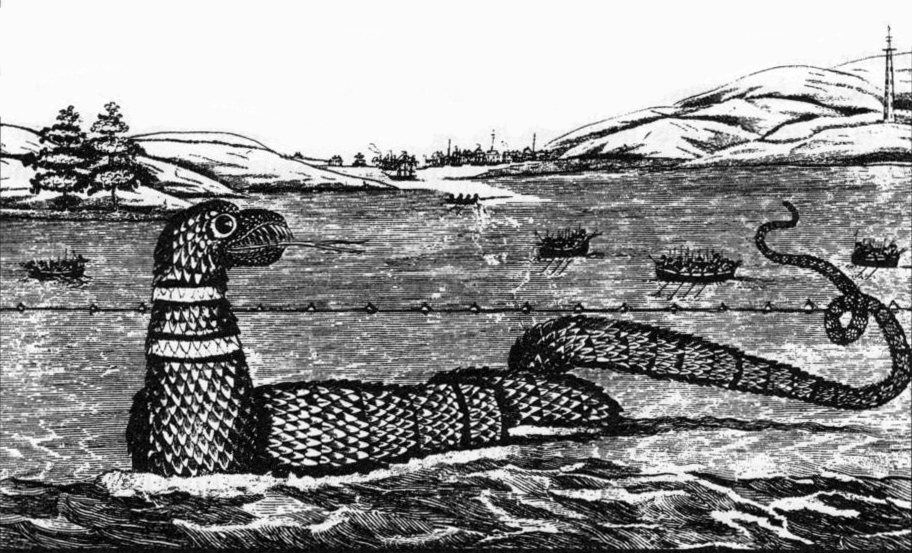
The Gloucester sea serpent, a "large marine animal, supposed to be a serpent, seen near Cape Ann, Massachusetts, in August 1817"

- July 4 – At Rome, New York, construction on the Erie Canal begins.
- July 12 – Benjamin Russell, in his Columbian Centinel newspaper, coins the phrase "Era of Good Feelings", which is later used to describe American politics from 1817 to 1825.
- August 15 – By act of the U.S. Congress (March 3), the Alabama Territory is created by splitting the Mississippi Territory in half, on the day the Mississippi constitution is drafted, four months before Mississippi becomes a U.S. state.
- September 25 – William W. Bibb is sworn in as the only governor of the Alabama Territory.

=== October–December ===
- November 20 – The first Seminole War begins in Florida.
- December 10 – Mississippi is admitted as the 20th U.S. state, formerly the Mississippi Territory. (see History of Mississippi). Then Alabama Territory is effective.
- December 30 – Hawaii plants coffee for the first time.

=== Undated ===
- John Neal published Keep Cool, A Novel, the first American work of fiction to use natural diction.
- Hoffman's Course of Legal Study is published in Baltimore.
- Jesse Torrey's A Portraiture of Domestic Slavery is published in Philadelphia.

=== Ongoing ===
- First Seminole War (1817–1818)
- Era of Good Feelings (1817–1825)

== Births ==
- February 7 – LeRoy Pope Walker, 1st Confederate States Secretary of War (died 1884)
- February 8 – Richard S. Ewell, Confederate general (died 1872)
- March 22 – Braxton Bragg, Confederate general (died 1876)
- March 26 – Herman Haupt, railroad civil engineer (died 1905)
- July 1 – Hugh J. Jewett, railroad president and politician (died 1898)
- July 12 – Henry David Thoreau, author, poet, philosopher, naturalist, environmentalist, surveyor, historian, abolitionist, tax resister and transcendentalist (died 1862)
- August 4 – Frederick Theodore Frelinghuysen, 29th United States Secretary of State (died 1885)
- August 14 – Alexander H. Bailey, politician (died 1874)
- September 13 – John M. Palmer, U.S. Senator for Illinois from 1891 to 1897 (died 1900)
- October 2 – Webster Wagner, inventor, manufacturer and politician (died 1883)
- October 28 – Cornelius Mathews, writer (died 1889)
- November 3 – Leonard Jerome, entrepreneur (grandfather of Winston Churchill) (died 1891)
- November 17 – Benjamin Champney, landscape painter (died 1907)
- November 19 – James A. McDougall, U.S. Senator from California from 1861 to 1867 (died 1867)
- December 23 – Warren Felt Evans, writer (died 1889)
- December 29 – Eli Saulsbury, U.S. Senator from Delaware from 1871 to 1889 (died 1893)
- December 31 – James T. Fields, publisher (died 1881)
- Date unknown – George R. Riddle, U.S. Senator from Delaware from 1864 to 1867, civil engineer and lawyer (died 1867)

== Deaths ==
- January 16 – Alexander J. Dallas, statesman and financier (born 1759)
- May 12 – William Goforth, physician and paleontologist (born 1766)
- June 24 – Thomas McKean, lawyer, President of the Continental Congress, and signatory of the Declaration of Independence (born 1734)
- August 7 – Pierre Samuel du Pont de Nemours, French-born industrialist (born 1739)
- September 18 – William Charles Wells, physician (born 1757)
- September 23 – Solomon Metcalf Allen, professor of languages, killed in fall from college roof (born 1789)
- Date unknown – Caleb Bingham, textbook author (born 1757)

== See also ==
- Timeline of United States history (1790–1819)
