= Richard P. Condie =

American musician

Personal details
- Born: July 5, 1898; Springville, Utah
- Died: December 22, 1985 (aged 87); Salt Lake City, Utah
- Alma mater: Brigham Young University; New England Conservatory of Music
- Occupation: conductor, musician
- Title: Director of the Mormon Tabernacle Choir

Richard P. Condie (July 5, 1898 – December 22, 1985) was the conductor of the Mormon Tabernacle Choir in Salt Lake City, Utah from 1957 to 1974.

Condie was a graduate of Brigham Young University (BYU) in 1923 and the New England Conservatory of Music in 1928 and became assistant conductor of the Mormon Tabernacle Choir in 1937. Condie taught at the McCune School of Music in Salt Lake City, at BYU in Provo, Utah, Utah State University in Logan Utah and at the University of Utah in Salt Lake City. After he became director of the Mormon Tabernacle Choir he formed a relationship with Eugene Ormandy and the Philadelphia Orchestra. Their most famous collaboration was the production of the Battle Hymn of the Republic in 1958 which won a Grammy Award. Condie Received an honorary doctor's degree from Brigham Young University in 1963, and another honorary doctor's degree from Utah State University in 1969.
