= William Schmedtgen =

William H. Schmedtgen
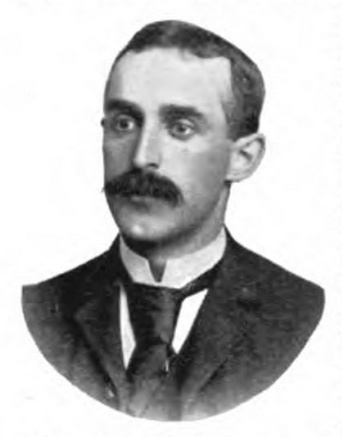
- Born: May 18, 1862; Chicago, Illinois, U.S.
- Died: December 29, 1936 (aged 74); Wilmette, Illinois, U.S.
- Known for: Illustration

William Herman Schmedtgen (May 18, 1862 – December 29, 1936) was an American illustrator and painter known as a pioneer in Chicago newspaper illustrating. Born in Chicago, he studied at the Art Institute of Chicago. His first work was with the Chicago Mail in 1883, he then spent two years in St. Louis and New York doing commercial art. He was chief of the art department at the Chicago Record from 1886 to 1901; and later on staff of the Chicago Record-Herald. He was a field artist for the Record during the Spanish–American War, stationed with U.S. troops in Cuba. He died at his home in Wilmette, aged 74.
