= Willie Has Gone to War =

"Willie Has Gone To War"

Song
- Language: English
- Released: 1862
- Composer: Stephen Foster
- Lyricist: George Cooper

"Willie Has Gone To War" is a song written by Stephen Collins Foster sometime in 1862. It was considered a 'Civil War Song', though it was not as popular as some of his previous work. George Cooper wrote the lyrics. He may have composed up to 285 songs, hymns, arrangements and instrumental works during his lifetime. He also created many of the lyrics.

== Lyrics ==
Original manuscript of the song in Foster's hand

The bluebird is singing his lay,
To all the sweet flow'rs of the dale,
The wild bee is reaming at play,
And soft is the sigh of the gale;
I stray by the brookside alone,
Where oft we have wander'd before,
And weep for my lov'd one, my own,
My Willie has gone to the war!
Chorus:
Willie has gone to the war,
Willie, Willie my lov'd one my own;
Willie has gone to the war,
Willie, Willie my lov'd one is gone!

'Twas here, where the lily bells grow,
I last saw his noble young face,
And now while he's gone to the foe,
Oh! dearly I love the old place;
The whispering waters repeat
The name that I love o'er and o'er,
And daisies that nod at my feet,
Say Willie has gone to the war!
Chorus:

The leaves of the forest will fade,
The roses will wither and die,
But spring to our home in the glade
On fairy like pinions will fly;
And still I will hopefully wait
The day when these battles are o'er,
And pine like a bird for its mate,
Till Willie comes home from the war!
Chorus:

== Other Foster "Willie..." songs ==
Foster wrote other "Willie" songs. Both his father and his half-brother were named William Barclay Foster.

- "Willie My Brave", (1851) words and music by Foster.
- "Willie's Gone to Heaven", (1863) words and music by Foster.
