= 1818 in the United States =

- Decades: 1790s; 1800s; 1810s; 1820s; 1830s
- See also: History of the United States (1789–1849); Timeline of United States history (1790–1819); List of years in the United States

Events from the year 1818 in the United States.

== Incumbents ==
=== Federal government ===
- President: James Monroe (DR-Virginia)
- Vice President: Daniel D. Tompkins (DR-New York)
- Chief Justice: John Marshall (Virginia)
- Speaker of the House of Representatives: Henry Clay (DR-Kentucky)
- Congress: 15th

==== State governments ====
Governors and lieutenant governors

=== Governors ===
- Governor of Connecticut: Oliver Wolcott Jr. (Toleration)
- Governor of Delaware: John Clark (Federalist)
- Governor of Georgia: William Rabun (Democratic-Republican)
- Governor of Illinois: Ninian Edwards (Democratic-Republican) (until October 6), Shadrach Bond (Independent) (starting December 3)
- Governor of Indiana: Jonathan Jennings (Democratic-Republican)
- Governor of Kentucky: Gabriel Slaughter (Democratic-Republican)
- Governor of Louisiana: Jacques Phillippe Villeré (Democratic-Republican)
- Governor of Maryland: Charles Carnan Ridgely (Democratic-Republican)
- Governor of Massachusetts: John Brooks (Federalist)
- Governor of Mississippi: David Holmes (Democratic-Republican)
- Governor of New Hampshire: William Plumer (Democratic-Republican)
- Governor of New Jersey: Isaac Halstead Williamson (Federalist)
- Governor of New York: DeWitt Clinton (Democratic-Republican)
- Governor of North Carolina: John Branch (Democratic-Republican)
- Governor of Ohio: Thomas Worthington (Democratic-Republican) (until December 14), Ethan Allen Brown (Democratic-Republican) (starting December 14)
- Governor of Pennsylvania: William Findlay (Democratic-Republican)
- Governor of Rhode Island: Nehemiah R. Knight (Democratic-Republican)
- Governor of South Carolina: Andrew Pickens (Democratic-Republican) (until December 8), John Geddes (Democratic-Republican) (starting December 8)
- Governor of Tennessee: Joseph McMinn (Democratic-Republican)
- Governor of Vermont: Jonas Galusha (Democratic-Republican)
- Governor of Virginia: James Patton Preston (Democratic-Republican)

=== Lieutenant governors ===
- Lieutenant Governor of Connecticut: Jonathan Ingersoll (Democratic-Republican)
- Lieutenant Governor of Illinois: Pierre Menard (Democratic-Republican) (starting October 6)
- Lieutenant Governor of Indiana: Christopher Harrison (Democratic-Republican) (until December 17), vacant (starting December 17)
- Lieutenant Governor of Kentucky: vacant
- Lieutenant Governor of Massachusetts: William Phillips Jr. (political party unknown)
- Lieutenant Governor of Mississippi: Duncan Stewart (no political party)
- Lieutenant Governor of New York: John Tayler (Democratic-Republican)
- Lieutenant Governor of Rhode Island: Edward Wilcox (political party unknown)
- Lieutenant Governor of South Carolina: John A. Cuthbert (Democratic-Republican) (until December 8), William Youngblood (Democratic-Republican) (starting December 8)
- Lieutenant Governor of Vermont: Paul Brigham (Democratic-Republican)

== Events ==
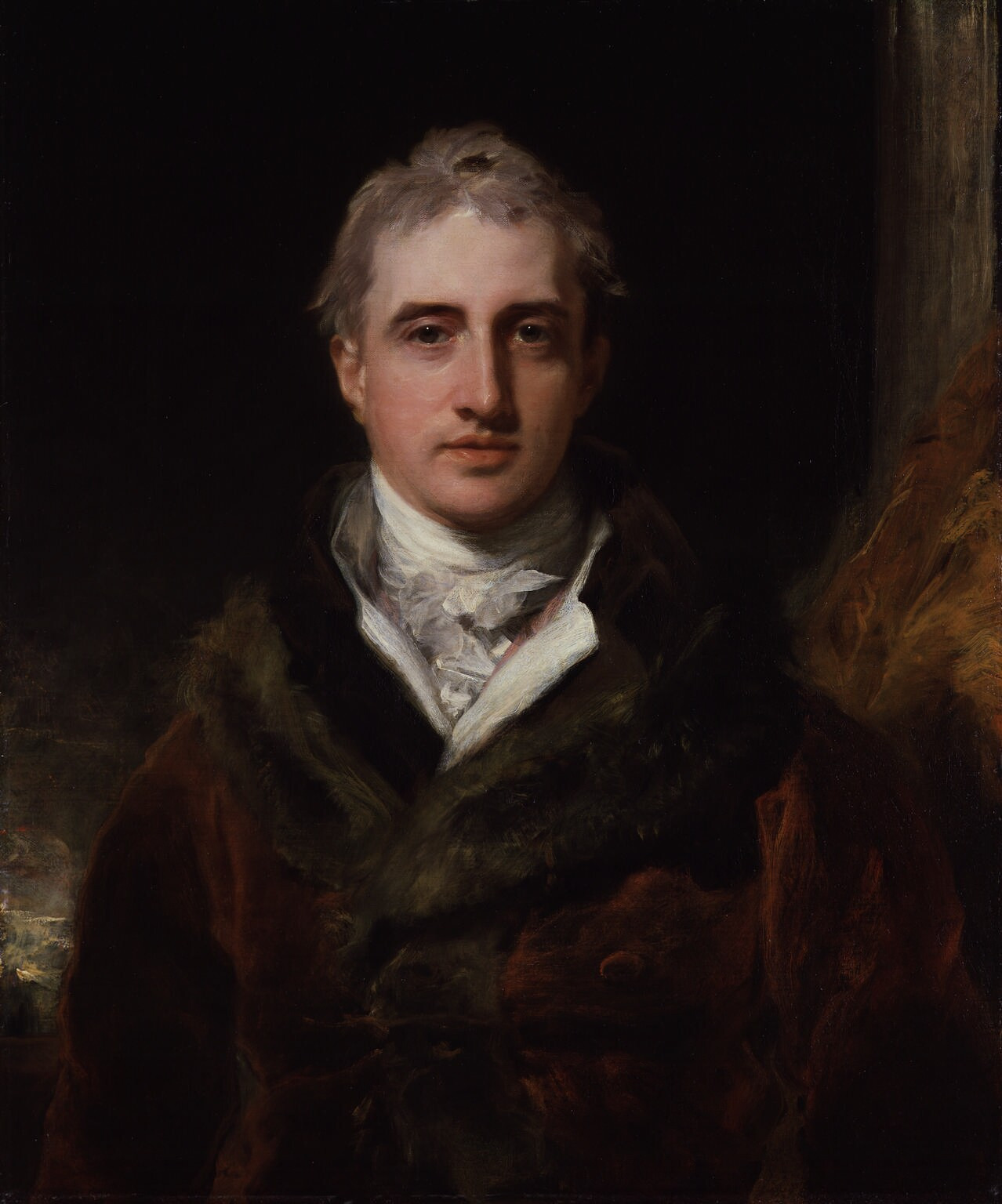
Portrait of Lord Castlereagh by Thomas Lawrence. The British Foreign Secretary Lord Castlereagh agreed the Treaty of 1818, improving Anglo-American relations.

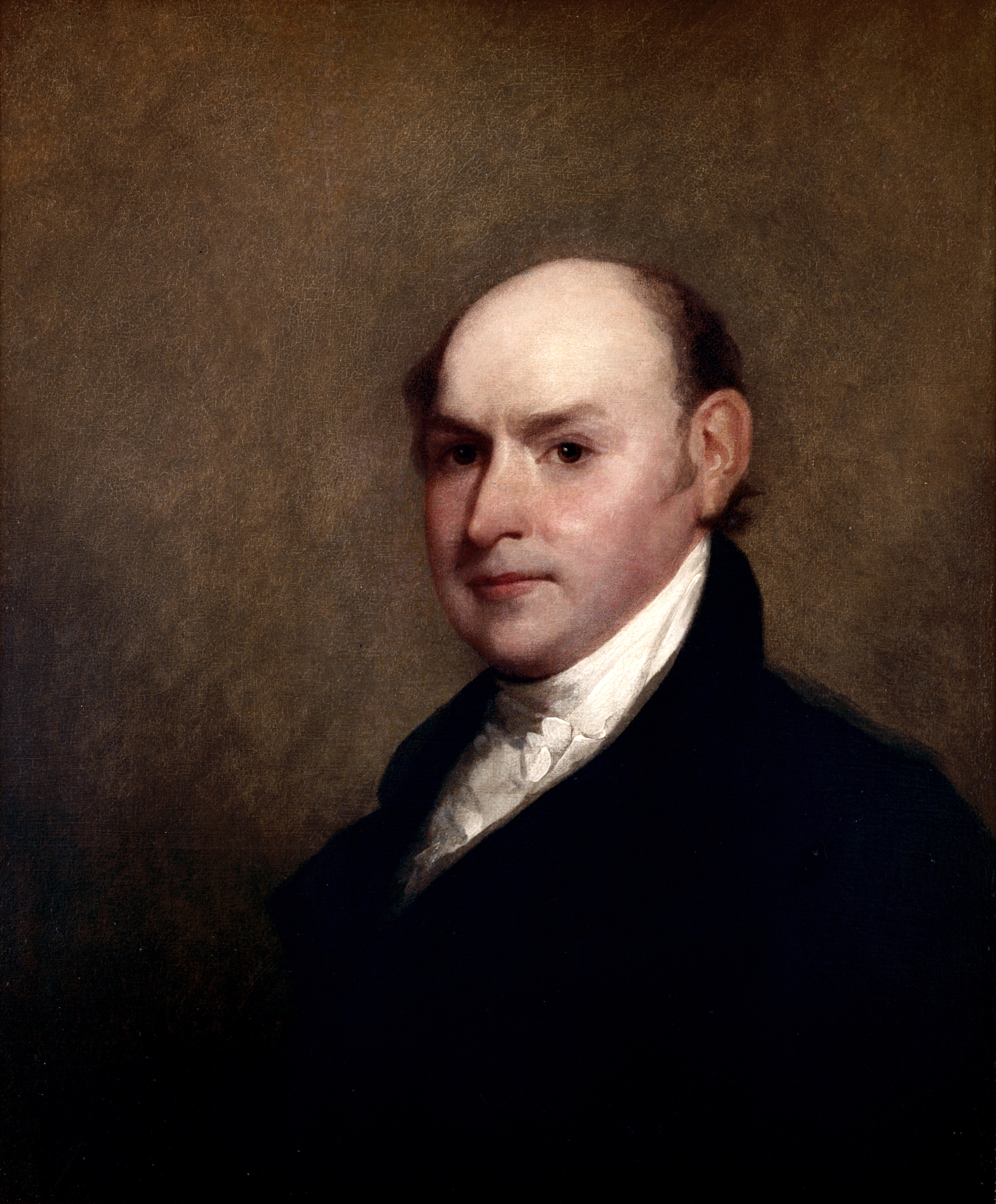
Portrait of John Quincy Adams by Gilbert Stuart. A former Ambassador to Britain Adams was Secretary of State when the Treaty was signed and ratified.

- March 15 – First Seminole War: Andrew Jackson leads an army into Spanish Florida.
- April 8 – Homathlemico and Hillis Hadjo are hanged near St. Marks, Florida by order of Andrew Jackson.
- April 29 – Arbuthnot and Ambrister incident – Alexander George Arbuthnot and Robert Ambrister are captured by Andrew Jackson's forces and later executed for aiding the Spanish and the Seminoles.
- April 4 – The U.S. Congress adopts the flag of the United States as having 13 red and white stripes and one star for each state (20 stars) with additional stars to be added whenever a new state is added to the Union.
- April 7 – Brooks Brothers, the oldest men's clothier in the United States, opens its first store on the northeast corner of Catherine and Cherry Streets in New York City, where the South Street Seaport later stands.
- April 14 – United States Coast Survey operations suspended until August 9, 1832.
- May 23 – First Seminole War: Andrew Jackson's army enters Pensacola, Florida unopposed as the Spanish forces retreat to Fort Barrancas.
- May 28 – First Seminole War: Fort Barrancas surrenders to Andrew Jackson.
- July 11 – The Bank of the United States reverses its policy of expanding credit and sends notices to its borrowers nationwide demanding immediate repayment of balances due; the defaults during the next six months will trigger the Panic of 1819.
- July 15 – U.S. President James Monroe convenes a cabinet meeting to discuss whether General Andrew Jackson's unauthorized invasion and conquest of Spanish Florida should be disavowed by the White House. Secretary of State John Quincy Adams persuades the President that the action is justifiable as stopping terror caused by the Seminole tribes.
- July 16 – The Daniel Webster Debate Society of Phillips Exeter Academy is founded as The Golden Branch Literary Society, making it the oldest surviving secondary school literary society in the U.S.
- July 31 – The first newspaper in Cleveland, Ohio is issued by publisher Andrew Logan. Using the original name of the small settlement (population 172), Logan names the weekly paper The Cleaveland Gazette & Commercial Register.
- August 1 – The Topographical Bureau of the United States Department of War is founded.
- October 6 – Shadrach Bond is sworn in as the first governor of Illinois.
- October 18 – Andrew Jackson and Isaac Shelby negotiate the Treaty of Tuscaloosa for the purchase of land in modern-day western Tennessee and southwestern Kentucky from the Chickasaw Nation in what is later called the Jackson Purchase.
- October 20 – The Treaty of 1818 between the U.S. and the United Kingdom establishes the northern boundary of the U.S. as the 49th parallel from the Lake of the Woods to the Rocky Mountains, also creating the Northwest Angle.
- December 3 – Illinois is admitted as the 21st U.S. state (see History of Illinois).
- The Osage Nation cedes traditional lands by treaty.
- Migration of Old Nation Cherokee to the Arkansas country (later Indian Territory).

=== Ongoing ===
- First Seminole War (1817–1818)
- Era of Good Feelings (1817–1825)

== Births ==
- January 28 – George S. Boutwell, U.S. Senator from Massachusetts from 1851 to 1853 (died 1905)
- February 4 – Emperor Norton, San Francisco eccentric and visionary (died 1880)
- February 13 – Angelica Singleton Van Buren, Acting First Lady of the United States (died 1877)
- February 14 (self-adopted date) - Frederick Douglass, social reformer (died 1895)
- March 10 – George W. Randolph, lawyer, planter, Confederate general, 3rd Confederate States Secretary of War (died 1867)
- March 12 – John S. Hager, U.S. Senator from California from 1873 to 1875 (died 1890)
- March 23 – Don Carlos Buell, United States Army officer in Seminole War, Mexican–American War and American Civil War (died 1898)
- March 24 – William E. Le Roy, admiral (died 1888)
- March 28 – Wade Hampton III, Confederate soldier and South Carolinian politician (died 1902)
- April 1 – Omar D. Conger, U.S. Senator from Michigan from 1881 to 1887 (died 1898)
- May 1 – Zenas King, bridge builder (died 1892)
- May 27 – Amelia Bloomer, dress reformer, women's rights activist (died 1894)
- May 28 – P. G. T. Beauregard, Southern military officer, politician, inventor, writer, civil servant and first prominent general of the Confederate States Army during the American Civil War (died 1893)
- July 1 – Josiah Gorgas, Northern-born Confederate general (died 1883)
- July 10 – John Stuart Williams, U.S. Senator from Kentucky from 1879 to 1885 (died 1898)
- July 18 – Celadon Leeds Daboll, merchant and inventor (died 1866)
- July 22 – J. Gregory Smith, Vermont governor (died 1891)
- August 1 – Maria Mitchell, astronomer (died 1889)
- August 3 – Mary Bell Smith, educator, social reformer, and writer (died 1884)
- August 13 – Lucy Stone, social reformer (died 1893)
- September 12 – Richard Jordan Gatling, inventor, gunsmith (died 1903)
- September 17 – William Henry Barnum, U.S. Senator from Connecticut from 1876 to 1879 (died 1889)
- October 8 – John Henninger Reagan, U.S. Senator from Texas, Acting Confederate States Secretary of the Treasury, Confederate States Postmaster General (died 1905)
- October 15 – Irvin McDowell, Union Army officer known for their defeat in the First Battle of Bull Run (died 1885)
- October 18 – Edward Ord, engineer and United States Army officer who saw action in the Seminole War, the Indian Wars, and the American Civil War (died 1883)
- November 5 – Benjamin Butler, major general of the Union Army during the American Civil War, leader in impeachment of Andrew Johnson (died 1893)
- November 11 – James Renwick Jr., architect (died 1895)
- December 13 – Mary Todd Lincoln, First Lady of the United States (died 1882)
- December 27 – J. Lawrence Smith, chemist (died 1883)

== Deaths ==
- February 13 –
  - George Rogers Clark, military leader (born 1752)
  - Absalom Jones, African-American abolitionist and clergyman (born 1746)
- May 10 – Paul Revere, American silversmith, engraver, early industrialist, and a Patriot in the American Revolution (born 1735)
- August 31 – Arthur St. Clair, major general in the Continental Army, President of the Continental Congress (born 1737)
- October 5 – Nancy Lincoln, mother of Abraham Lincoln (born 1784)
- October 28 – Abigail Adams, First Lady of the United States, Second Lady of the United States (born 1744)
- November 6 – Caleb Gibbs, commander (born 1748)

== See also ==
- Timeline of United States history (1790–1819)
