= Solomon Metcalf Allen =

- Born: February 18, 1789; Pittsfield, Massachusetts
- Died: September 23, 1817 (aged 28); Painter Hall, Middlebury College
- Education: Andover Theological Seminary

Solomon Metcalf Allen (18 February 1789 – 23 September 1817) was a professor of languages at Middlebury College. He was born in Pittsfield, Massachusetts, and studied at Andover Theological Seminary from 1813 to 1814. The rest of his career was spent at Middlebury College: tutoring from 1814 to 1816; Professor elect of Languages, 1816–1817. While attempting to repair a chimney on the roof of Painter Hall, he fell eight to ten feet down to the roof, then about forty feet to the ground. Allen succumbed to his injuries before 10:00pm that evening. He was later highly eulogized in Carlos Wilcox's Remains (1828).
