= Theodore Timby =

American inventor (1819–1909)

Theodore Ruggles Timby
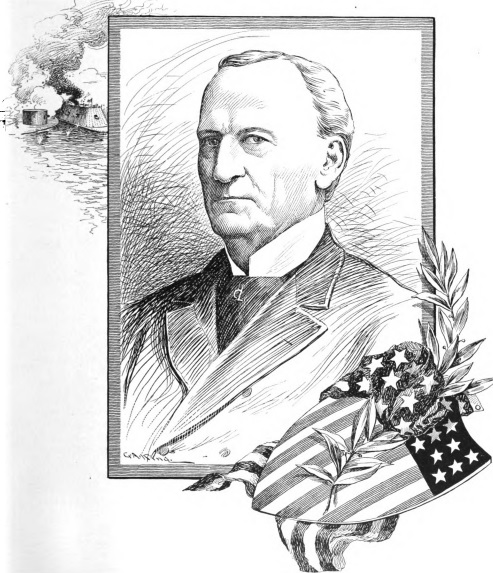
- Born: April 5, 1819; Dover Plains, New York, US
- Died: November 9, 1909 (aged 90); Brooklyn, New York, US
- Resting place: Oak Hill Cemetery (Washington, D.C.)

Theodore Ruggles Timby (5 April 1819 – 9 November 1909) is credited as the inventor of the revolving gun turret that was used on the USS Monitor, the ironclad warship that fought in the American Civil War. He was born in Dutchess County, New York on April 5, 1819. Early in life, living in Cato Four Corners (later Meridian, in Cayuga County, New York), at the age of 16, he invented a method for raising ships out of the water for repairs by sinking a water-filled box beneath it, then forcing the water out through pumps in order to raise the ship.

Throughout the 1840s, Timby perfected a revolving gun turret for use on land or water. He constructed a 21-foot-long (6.4 m) model and brought it to Washington but met with little success, as war was not imminent. However, with the outbreak of the Civil War, Timby brought his model to the Abraham Lincoln White House, and this time met with a much warmer reception.

Meanwhile, a Swedish-born architect named John Ericsson had submitted a proposal to build an ironclad warship for the Union Navy. The Monitor was built for $195,000 and was sold to the Union Navy for $270,000. Timby received a 5 percent commission of $13,500.

Timby spent much of his life in Saratoga Springs, New York, having moved there in 1860. He patented a wide variety of other inventions, such as a door sash, water wheel, paper cutter, needle case, and a globe clock that was sold in such numbers that some can be seen today on auction sites.

There was an effort in the early 1900s to give credit to Timby for his turret invention. The Washington Post stated in 1909 shortly after his death that "John Ericsson has for years monopolized all of the credit for inventing and building the Monitor, but as a matter of fact he was joint inventor with Theodore Timby."

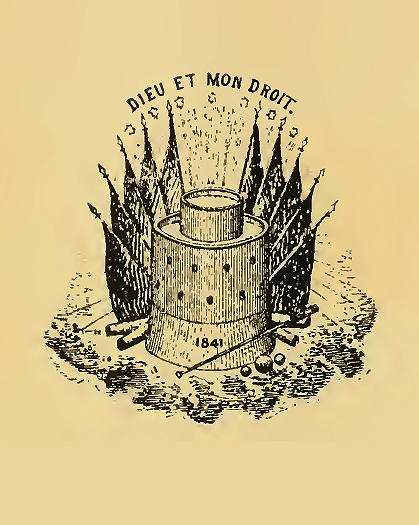
A logo used by Timby
