= H. W. Perlman =

American piano company

H. W. Perlman was an American manufacturer of pianos. Founded in 1898 by Harry W. Perlman, it was established on the Lower East Side of Manhattan and may have been one of the first Jewish-owned piano builders in New York. Later facilities were located on Canal Street and Grand Street.
