= Christian Dancel =

German inventor (born 1847)

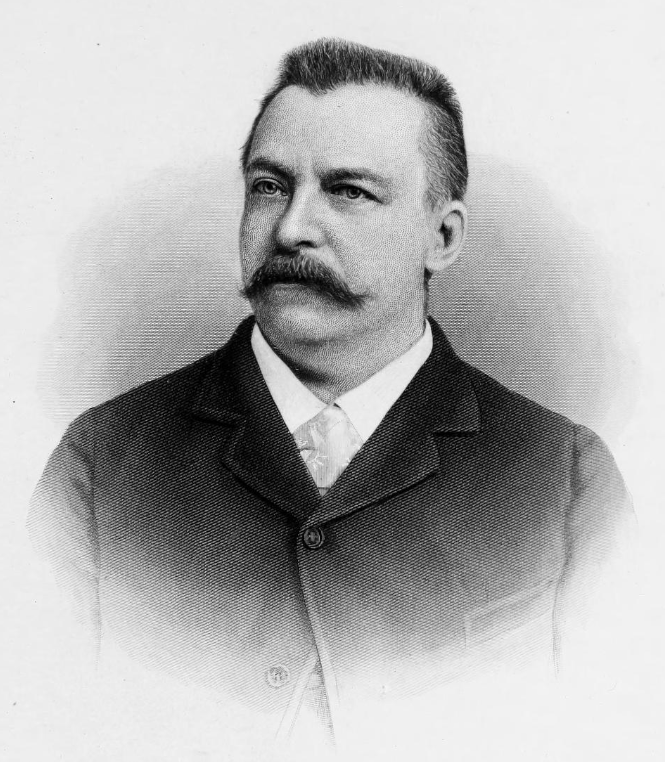
- Born: February 14, 1847; Kassel, Electorate of Hesse
- Died: October 13, 1898 (aged 51); Brooklyn, New York, United States
- Occupation: Inventor

Christian Dancel (February 14, 1847 – October 13, 1898) was a German-American inventor. He was most notably under contract with the Goodyear Shoe Machinery Company of Connecticut.

== Biography ==
Christian Dancel was born in Kassel, Electorate of Hesse on February 14, 1847. He learned mechanical engineering and machinist trades in polytechnic schools. In 1865, within two years of his emigration to New York City, he had invented a machine for sewing shoes.

Charles Goodyear Jr. (son of Charles Goodyear) bought the rights to this machine, and employed Dancel as superintendent of his factory. Soon thereafter, Dancel theorized, created and patented many shoe-construction machines and associated devices. These included a machine to sew a turned shoe, one of which was converted into a "stitcher", and stitch a shoe's out soles. In 1874, he created and installed a shoe welt guide to stitch shoe welts on it. This machine, purchased by his employer, is currently in use today (with only minor improvements to it added).

In 1876, Dancel simultaneously opened his own shop of patented machines used to finish shoes. Over an eight-year time span, at the Goodyear Company's request, he invented a machine with a curved needle which sewed a shoe's outer sole and upper sole with a lockstitch (an improvement over the previous model). He presented it to the Goodyear Company in 1885. He followed this in 1891 with a straight-needle machine delivered a year later. Around 1895, he developed the Brooklyn-based Dancel Machine Company. Just prior to his death, he created a machine which performed all of the aforementioned functions plus stitched the in-sole, all caught with one stroke of the needle.

Dancel's solution of various shoe-related stitch-forming problems is the foundation upon which the current Goodyear welt system is based. He also co-patented machines designed for manufacturing barbed-wire fencing, for skiving leather, to gage and mark leather, for making leather buttonholes, for rubbing type, and for removing bristles from seal skins.

He died at his home in Brooklyn, New York on October 13, 1898.
