= Arthur Starr Eakle =

American mineralogist (1862–1931)

- Born: July 27, 1862; Washington, D.C., United States
- Died: July 5, 1931 (aged 68); Honolulu, Hawaii, United States
- Education: Ludwig-Maximilians-Universität München
- Spouse: Fannie V. Kenney (1899-)
- Scientific career
- Fields: Mineralogy
- Workplaces: University of California, Berkeley

Arthur Starr Eakle (27 July 1862 – 5 July 1931) was an American mineralogist. Eakle researched the mineralogical conditions of areas of California, Nevada and Hawaii. His work on Oahu, the third-largest island in Hawaii, included identifying numerous new minerals.

== Life ==
Eakle was born in 1862 in Washington, D.C. In 1894, he taught at Harvard University. He earned his doctorate in 1896 from the Ludwig-Maximilians-Universität München. In 1899, he married Fannie V. Kenney. In 1900, they moved to Berkeley, California.

In 1903, Eakle joined the University of California, Berkeley as an associate professor. Ten years later, in 1913, he became professor, and full professor in 1919. Eakle became president of the Mineralogical Society of America in 1925. In 1929, he became professor emeritus and in 1930, moved to Hawaii to do research in partnership with the University of Hawaii.

While in Hawaii, Eakle did field work focused on mineralogical conditions Oahu. His research determined that the islands were unlikely to produce precious metals, specifically gold and silver, due to the basalt composition, making the landscape low in silica. Eakle discovered pockets of copper at Pālolo Quarry. Additionally, Eakle researched the age of the Hawaiian Islands, estimating that the islands were "at least 1,000,000 years old," based on the rock composition. He also discovered that the black beaches of Kaimū comprised volcanic glass. His work on Oahu also included the discovery of numerous new minerals. While on Oahu, he stayed with geologist Harold T. Stearns.

On June 24, 1931, Eakle was taken to St. Francis Hospital suffering from pneumonia, which he had contracted as a result of influenza he had earlier in the month. Eakle died on July 5. Eakle's Hawaiian research was sent to Washington, D.C., where his students continued it.

== Bibliography ==
- The Minerals of Tonopah, Nevada. Berkeley: University of California Press (1912)
- Minerals Of California. Sacramento: California State Mining Bureau (1922). ISBN 0781250293
