= 1797 in the United States =

- Decades: 1770s; 1780s; 1790s; 1800s; 1810s
- See also: History of the United States (1789–1849); Timeline of United States history (1790–1819); List of years in the United States

Events from the year 1797 in the United States.

== Incumbents ==
=== Federal government ===
- President:

George Washington (Independent-Virginia) (until March 4)
John Adams (F-Massachusetts) (starting March 4)

- Vice President:

John Adams (F-Massachusetts) (until March 4)
Thomas Jefferson (DR-Virginia) (starting March 4)

- Chief Justice: Oliver Ellsworth (Connecticut)
- Speaker of the House of Representatives: Jonathan Dayton (F-New Jersey)
- Congress: 4th (until March 4), 5th (starting March 4)

==== State governments ====
Governors and lieutenant governors

=== Governors ===
- Governor of Connecticut: Oliver Wolcott (Federalist) (until December 1), Jonathan Trumbull Jr. (Federalist) (starting December 1)
- Governor of Delaware: Gunning Bedford Sr. (Federalist) (until September 28), Daniel Rogers (Federalist) (starting September 28)
- Governor of Georgia: Jared Irwin (Democratic-Republican)
- Governor of Kentucky: James Garrard (Democratic-Republican)
- Governor of Maryland: John Hoskins Stone (Federalist) (until November 17), John Henry (Democratic-Republican) (starting November 17)
- Governor of Massachusetts: Samuel Adams (no political party) (until June 2), Increase Sumner (Federalist) (starting June 2)
- Governor of New Hampshire: John Taylor Gilman (Federalist)
- Governor of New Jersey: Richard Howell (Federalist)
- Governor of New York: John Jay (Federalist)
- Governor of North Carolina: Samuel Ashe (Anti-Federalist)
- Governor of Pennsylvania: Thomas Mifflin (no political party)
- Governor of Rhode Island: Arthur Fenner (Country)
- Governor of South Carolina: Charles Pinckney (Democratic-Republican)
- Governor of Tennessee: John Sevier (Democratic-Republican)
- Governor of Vermont:
  - Until August 25: Thomas Chittenden (no political party)
  - August 25-October 16: Paul Brigham (Democratic-Republican)
  - starting October 16: Isaac Tichenor (Federalist)
- Governor of Virginia: James Wood (Democratic-Republican)

=== Lieutenant governors ===
- Lieutenant Governor of Connecticut: Jonathan Trumbull, Jr. (Federalist) (until December 1), John Treadwell (Federalist) (starting December 1)
- Lieutenant Governor of Massachusetts: Moses Gill (political party unknown)
- Lieutenant Governor of New York: Stephen Van Rensselaer (political party unknown)
- Lieutenant Governor of Rhode Island: Samuel J. Potter (Democratic-Republican)
- Lieutenant Governor of South Carolina: Robert Anderson (Federalist)
- Lieutenant Governor of Vermont: Paul Brigham (Democratic-Republican)

== Events ==
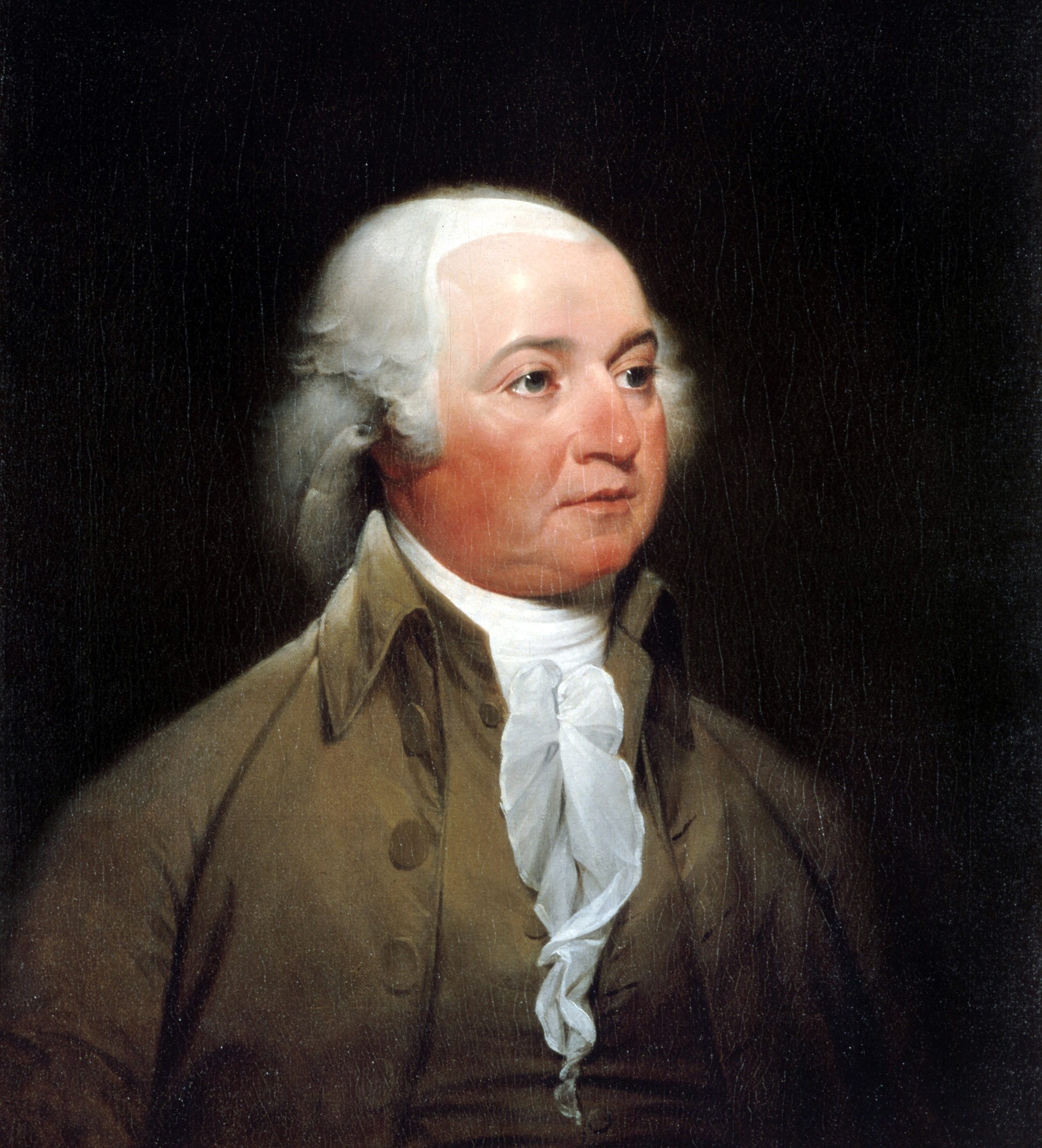
March 4: John Adams becomes the second U.S. president

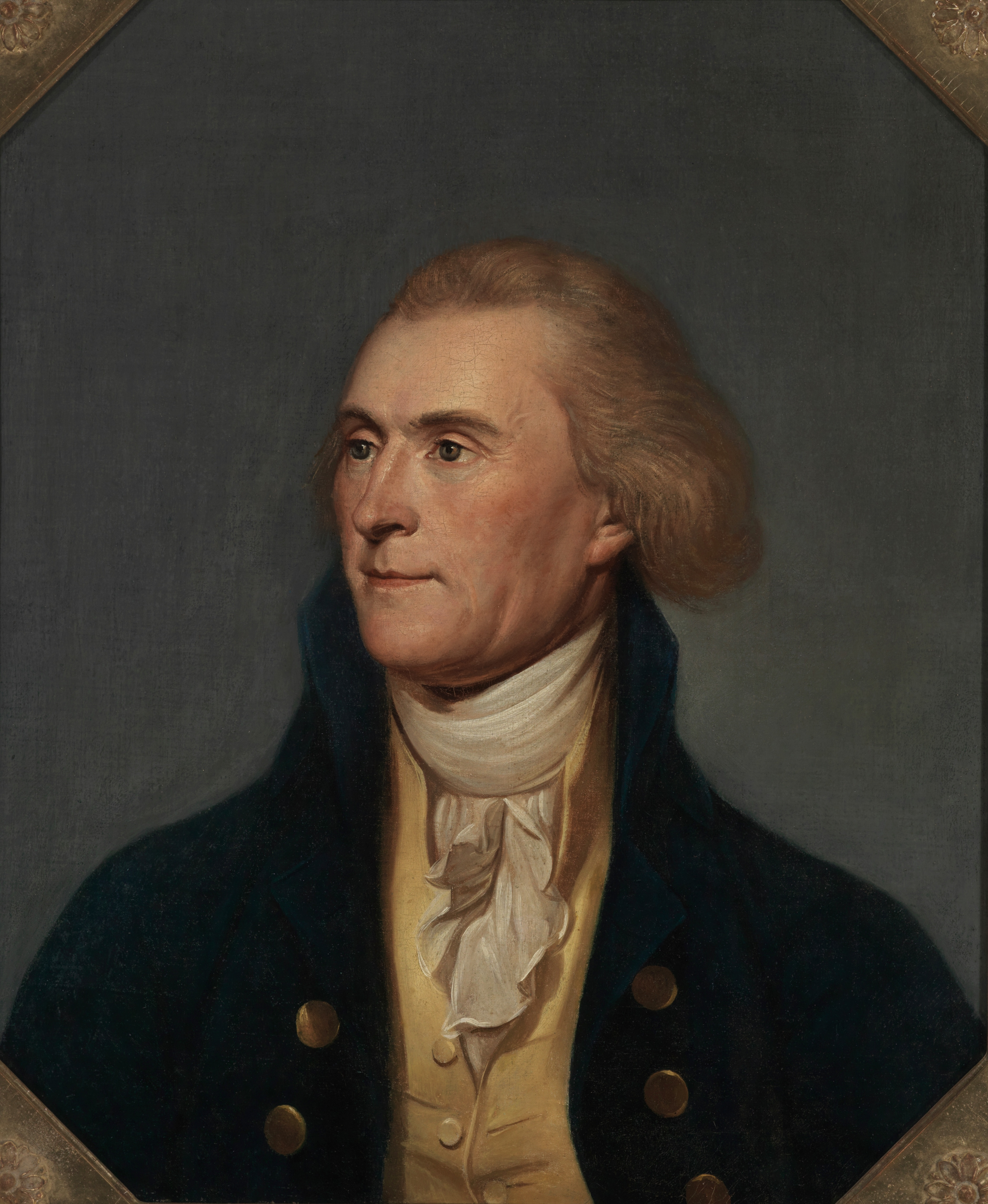
Thomas Jefferson becomes the second U.S. vice president

- January 3 – The Treaty of Tripoli (a peace treaty between the United States and Tripoli) is signed at Algiers (see also 1796 in the United States).
- February 22 – The last invasion of Britain: An American colonel named William Tate leads French forces in a landing near Fishguard in Wales.
- March 4 – John Adams is sworn in as the second president of the United States, and Thomas Jefferson is sworn in as the second vice president.
- April 17 – Sir Ralph Abercromby unsuccessfully invades San Juan, Puerto Rico, in what will be one of the largest British attacks on Spanish territories in the western hemisphere, and one of the worst defeats of the English navy for years to come.
- May – Federalists in Congress propose a $20 tax on naturalization certificates to impede immigration, particularly from Ireland.
- May 10 – The first ship of the United States Navy, the frigate USS United States (1797), is commissioned.
- July 8 – Senator William Blount of Tennessee becomes the first individual to be expelled from Congress for treason and conspiracy to incite rebellion.
- October 21 – In Boston Harbor, the 44-gun United States Navy frigate USS Constitution is launched to fight Barbary pirates off the coast of Tripoli.
- October 23 – Peter Bryan Bruin, Gabriel Benoist, Philander Smith, Daniel Clark Sr., Isaac Gaillard, and others compose a "Memorial to Congress by Permanent Committee of the Natchez District," expressing their preference for American control of the Natchez District and their desire to have slavery preserved in Mississippi.

=== Undated ===
- The XYZ Affair inflames tensions between France and the United States.

=== Ongoing ===
- Panic of 1796–1797 (1796–1797)
- XYZ Affair (1797–1798)

== Births ==
- January 1
  - Robert Crittenden, attorney and politician (d. 1834)
  - William Greene, lieutenant governor of the state of Rhode Island (d. 1883)
- January 2 – Eliakim Littell, editor (d. 1870)
- January 4 – John Hampden Pleasants, journalist and businessman (d. 1846)
- January 5 – Timothy Gilbert, piano manufacturer (d. 1865)
- January 6 – James Kingsley, attorney and mayor of Ann Arbor (1855–1856) (d. 1878)
- January 8 – David Barker Jr., politician, member of the United States House of Representatives (d. 1834)
- January 10
  - Hazen Aldrich, early leader in the Latter Day Saint movement (d. 1873)
  - Eugenio Kincaid, Baptist missionary to Burma (d. 1883)
- January 12 – George Evans, politician from Maine (d. 1867)
- January 16 – Richard Barnes Mason, career officer in the United States Army, governor of California (d. 1850)
- January 28 – Obadiah Bush, prospector and businessman (d. 1851)
- January 30
  - John Fairfield, politician from Maine (d. 1847)
  - Edwin Vose Sumner, career United States Army officer who became a Union Army general during the American Civil War (d. 1863)
- February 5 – F. W. P. Greenwood, Unitarian minister of King's Chapel in Boston (d. 1843)
- February 7 – François Chouteau, pioneer fur trader (d. 1838)
- February 11 – John Allen Wakefield, historian and politician (d. 1873)
- February 18 – Elias Florence, member of the United States House of Representatives (d. 1880)
  - John Davis Pierce, Congregationalist minister (d. 1882)
- February 28
  - John Henderson, United States Senator from Mississippi from 1839 till 1845 (died 1857)
  - George Keats, businessman and civic leader in Louisville, Kentucky (d. 1841)
- February 14 – John Capron, infantry officer (died 1878)
- March 2 – Stephen Olin, educator and minister (died 1851)
- March 4
  - Jasper Ewing Brady, Whig member of the United States House of Representatives (died 1871)
  - Charles Jackson, 18th Governor of Rhode Island (1845-1846) (died 1876)
- March 18 – James Wilson II, United States Representative from New Hampshire (died 1881)
- March 21 – William K. Clowney, United States Representative from South Carolina (died 1851)
- March 22 – Pierre Bossier, Louisiana soldier and state senator (d. 1844)
- May 24 – James Morehead, United States Senator from Kentucky from 1841 to 1847. (died 1854)
- June 13 – Richard Ely Selden, American politician and author (died 1868)
- June 14
  - John Beard, politician (d. 1876)
  - Calvin Pollard, New York City architect (d. 1850)
- June 21
  - William Jessup, Pennsylvania judge and father of the missionary Henry Harris Jessup (d. 1868)
  - Benson Leavitt, Boston businessman (d. 1869)
- June 27 – Andrew W. Loomis, United States Representative from Ohio (died 1873)

== Deaths ==
- November 26 – Andrew Adams, signatory of the Articles of Confederation (born 1736)

== See also ==
- Timeline of United States history (1790–1819)
