= 1855 in the United States =

- Decades: 1830s; 1840s; 1850s; 1860s; 1870s
- See also: History of the United States (1849–1865); Timeline of United States history (1820–1859); List of years in the United States

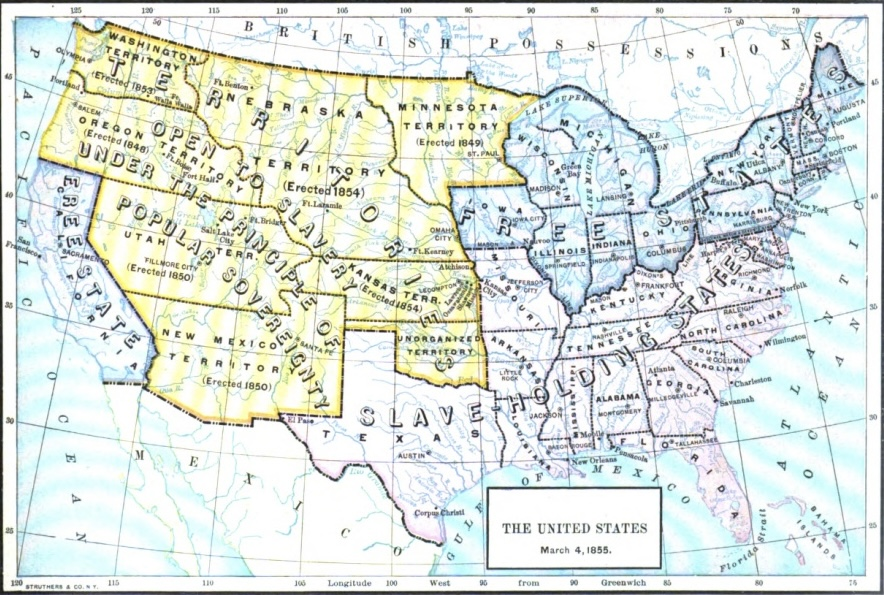
Map of the United States in 1855, by Albert Bushnell Hart

Events from the year 1855 in the United States.

== Incumbents ==
=== Federal government ===
- President: Franklin Pierce (D-New Hampshire)
- Vice President: vacant
- Chief Justice: Roger B. Taney (Maryland)
- Speaker of the House of Representatives: Linn Boyd (D-Kentucky)
- Congress: 33rd (until March 4), 34th (starting March 4)

==== State governments ====
Governors and lieutenant governors

=== Governors ===
- Governor of Alabama: John A. Winston (Democratic)
- Governor of Arkansas: Elias Nelson Conway (Democratic)
- Governor of California: John Bigler (Democratic)
- Governor of Connecticut: Henry Dutton (Whig) (until May 2), William T. Minor (Know Nothing) (starting May 2)
- Governor of Delaware: William H. H. Ross (Democratic) (until January 16), Peter F. Causey (Know Nothing) (starting January 16)
- Governor of Florida: James E. Broome (Democratic)
- Governor of Georgia: Herschel V. Johnson (Democratic)
- Governor of Illinois: Joel Aldrich Matteson (Democratic)
- Governor of Indiana: Joseph A. Wright (Democratic)
- Governor of Iowa: James W. Grimes (Whig)
- Governor of Kentucky: Lazarus W. Powell (Democratic) (until September 4), Charles S. Morehead (Know Nothing) (starting September 4)
- Governor of Louisiana: Paul Octave Hébert (Democratic)
- Governor of Maine: William G. Crosby (Whig) (until January 3), Anson Morrill (Republican) (starting January 3)
- Governor of Maryland: Thomas W. Ligon (Democratic)
- Governor of Massachusetts: Emory Washburn (Whig) (until January 4), Henry Gardner (Know Nothing) (starting January 4)
- Governor of Michigan: Andrew Parsons (Democratic) (until January 3), Kinsley S. Bingham (Republican) (starting January 3)
- Governor of Mississippi: John J. McRae (Democratic)
- Governor of Missouri: Sterling Price (Democratic)
- Governor of New Hampshire: Nathaniel B. Baker (Democratic) (until June 7), Ralph Metcalf (Know Nothing) (starting June 7)
- Governor of New Jersey: Rodman M. Price (Democratic)
- Governor of New York: Myron H. Clark (Whig) (starting January 1)
- Governor of North Carolina: Warren Winslow (Democratic) (until January 1), Thomas Bragg (Democratic) (starting January 1)
- Governor of Ohio: William Medill (Democratic)
- Governor of Pennsylvania: William Bigler (Democratic) (until January 16), James Pollock (Whig) (starting January 16)
- Governor of Rhode Island: William W. Hoppin (Whig)
- Governor of South Carolina: James Hopkins Adams (Democratic)
- Governor of Tennessee: Andrew Johnson (Democratic)
- Governor of Texas: Elisha M. Pease (Democratic)
- Governor of Vermont: Stephen Royce (Whig)/(Republican)
- Governor of Virginia: Joseph Johnson (Democratic)
- Governor of Wisconsin: William A. Barstow (Democratic)

=== Lieutenant governors ===
- Lieutenant Governor of California: Samuel Purdy (Democratic)
- Lieutenant Governor of Connecticut: Alexander H. Holley (Whig) (starting January 4), William Field (Free Soil) (starting January 4)
- Lieutenant Governor of Illinois: Gustavus Koerner (Democratic)
- Lieutenant Governor of Indiana: Ashbel P. Willard (Democratic)
- Lieutenant Governor of Kentucky: vacant (until September 4), James Greene Hardy (Know Nothing) (starting September 4)
- Lieutenant Governor of Louisiana: Robert C. Wickliffe (Democratic)
- Lieutenant Governor of Massachusetts: William C. Plunkett (political party unknown) (until month and day unknown), Simon Brown (political party unknown) (starting month and day unknown)
- Lieutenant Governor of Michigan: George Griswold (Democratic) (until month and day unknown), George Coe (Republican) (starting month and day unknown)
- Lieutenant Governor of Missouri: Wilson Brown (Democratic) (until August 27), vacant (starting August 27)
- Lieutenant Governor of New York: Henry Jarvis Raymond (Whig) (starting January 1)
- Lieutenant Governor of Ohio: James Myers (Democratic)
- Lieutenant Governor of Rhode Island: John J. Reynolds (political party unknown) (until month and day unknown), Anderson C. Rose (political party unknown) (starting month and day unknown)
- Lieutenant Governor of South Carolina: Richard de Treville (Democratic)
- Lieutenant Governor of Texas: David Catchings Dickson (Democratic) (until month and day unknown), Hardin Richard Runnels (Democratic) (starting month and day unknown)
- Lieutenant Governor of Vermont: Ryland Fletcher (Republican)
- Lieutenant Governor of Virginia: Shelton Leake (Democratic)
- Lieutenant Governor of Wisconsin: James T. Lewis (Republican)

== Events ==
- January – Klamath and Salmon River War: In Klamath County, California, hostility between settlers and the local Native Americans becomes violent. The California State Militia and U.S. Army intervene, ending the war in March.
- January 23 – The first bridge over the Mississippi River opens in what is now Minneapolis, Minnesota (a crossing made today by the Hennepin Avenue Bridge).
- January 26 – The Point No Point Treaty is signed in the Washington Territory.
- February 12 – Michigan State University (the "pioneer" land-grant college) is established.
- February 15 – The North Carolina General Assembly incorporates the Western North Carolina Railroad to build a rail line from Salisbury to the western part of the state.
- February 22 – Pennsylvania State University is founded as the Farmers' High School of Pennsylvania.
- March 3 – The U.S. Congress appropriates $30,000 to create the U.S. Camel Corps.
- March 16 – Bates College is founded by abolitionists in Lewiston, Maine.
- March 30 – Elections are held for the first Kansas Territory legislature. Missourian 'Border Ruffians' cross the border in large numbers to elect a pro-slavery body.

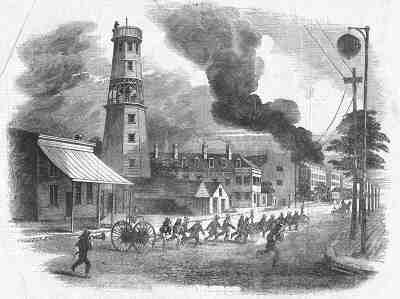
Cincinnati riots of 1855

- April – Cincinnati riots of 1855: Tension between nativists and German-American immigrants in Cincinnati breaks out into territorial street fighting on election day.
- May 17 – The Mount Sinai Hospital is dedicated (as the Jews' Hospital) in New York City; it opens to patients on June 5.
- June 6 – Portland Rum Riot: A crowd gathers at a storehouse believed to hold alcohol in Portland, Maine. The militia is called in and fires on the crowd to disperse the crowd, killing one person.
- June 28 – The Sigma Chi fraternity is founded at Miami University in Oxford, Ohio.
- July 1 – Quinault Treaty signed, Quinault and Quileute cede their land to the United States.
- July 2 – The Kansas Territorial Legislature convenes in Pawnee and begins passing proslavery laws.
- July 4 – Walt Whitman's poetry collection Leaves of Grass is published in Brooklyn.
- July 4 –Amelia Bloomer speaks in favor of women's rights and suffrage in Omaha, Nebraska.
- July 6 – The Kansas Territorial Legislature meets for the last time in Pawnee, voting to relocate to Shawnee, closer to the border of slave state Missouri.
- July 16 – U.S. Indian commissioner Isaac Stevens signs the Hellgate treaty with Native Americans living in modern-day western Montana.
- August 6 – Bloody Monday: Protestant mobs attack Irish and German Catholics on an election day in Louisville, Kentucky, causing 22 deaths.
- September 3 – First Sioux War: Battle of Ash Hollow – U.S. forces defeat a band of Brulé Lakota in present-day Garden County, Nebraska.
- October 5 – Yakima War: Battle of Toppenish Creek – In the Yakima River Valley, a band of Yakama warriors forces a company of U.S. soldiers to retreat in the first battle of the War.
- October 28–31 – 1855 Fiji expedition: The U.S. Navy dispatches the USS John Adams to Viti Levu, Fiji, to protect American interests. One American sailor is killed and two Marines are wounded.
- November 1 – 31 people are killed in the Gasconade Bridge train disaster in Missouri.
- November 9–10 – Yakima War: Battle of Union Gap – American soldiers attack a Yakama village, forcing the village to retreat.
- November 21 – Large-scale Bleeding Kansas violence begins with events leading to the Wakarusa War between antislavery and proslavery forces.

=== Ongoing ===
- Samuel Colt incorporates his business as the Colt's Patent Firearms Manufacturing Company and opens a new factory, the Colt Armory, in Hartford, Connecticut. Horace Smith and Daniel B. Wesson form the Volcanic Repeating Arms Company in New England.
- California Gold Rush (1848–1855)
- Bleeding Kansas (1854–1860)
- Third Seminole War (1855–1858)
- Yakima War (1855–1858)

== Births ==
- February 4 – George Cope, painter (died 1929)
- February 23 – Jonathan Bourne, Jr., U.S. Senator from Oregon from 1907 to 1913 (died 1940)
- June 14 – Robert M. La Follette, U.S. Senator from Wisconsin (died 1925)
- June 17 – Janet Cook Lewis, portrait painter, librarian and bookbinder (died 1947)
- July 12 – Eugene Prussing, lawyer and philanthropist (died 1936)
- July 29 – Bowman Brown Law, politician (died 1916)
- August 4 – Jay Hunt, film director (died 1932)
- September 2 – M. Hoke Smith, U.S. Senator from Georgia from 1911 to 1920 (died 1931)
- October 21 – Howard Hyde Russell, temperance activist (died 1946)
- October 23 – James S. Sherman, 27th vice president of the United States from 1909 to 1912 (died 1912)
- October 26 – Jessie Wilson Manning, author and lecturer (died 1947)
- November 5 – Eugene V. Debs, union leader (died 1926)
- November 6 – Annie Keeler, early woman physician (died 1927)
- December 10 – August Spies, labor activist and newspaper editor (died 1887)
- December 28 – John William Wood, Sr., North Carolinan politician, founder of Benson, North Carolina (died 1928)

== Deaths ==
- March 8 – William Poole, founder of the street gang the Bowery Boys and leader of the Know Nothing political movement (born 1821)
- March 25 – Thomas Fitzgerald, United States Senator from Michigan from 1848 till 1849. (born 1796)
- March 28 – William S. Archer, United States Senator from Virginia from 1841 till 1847. (born 1789)
- May 7 – Walter T. Colquitt, United States Senator from Georgia from 1843 till 1848. (born 1799)
- June 29 – John Gorrie, physician, scientist, inventor, and humanitarian (born 1803)
- August 18 – Thomas Metcalfe, United States Senator from Kentucky from 1848 till 1849. (born 1780)

== See also ==
- Timeline of United States history (1820–1859)
