= 1799 in the United States =

- Decades: 1770s; 1780s; 1790s; 1800s; 1810s
- See also: History of the United States (1789–1849); Timeline of the American Revolution; List of years in the United States

Events from the year 1799 in the United States.

== Incumbents ==
=== Federal government ===
- President: John Adams (F-Massachusetts)
- Vice President: Thomas Jefferson (DR-Virginia)
- Chief Justice: Oliver Ellsworth (Connecticut)
- Speaker of the House of Representatives:

Jonathan Dayton (F-New Jersey) (until March 4)
Theodore Sedgwick (F-Massachusetts) (starting December 2)

- Congress: 5th (until March 4), 6th (starting March 4)

==== State governments ====
Governors and lieutenant governors

=== Governors ===
- Governor of Connecticut: Jonathan Trumbull Jr. (Federalist)
- Governor of Delaware: Daniel Rogers (Federalist) (until January 9), Richard Bassett (Federalist) (starting January 9)
- Governor of Georgia: James Jackson (Democratic-Republican)
- Governor of Kentucky: James Garrard (Democratic-Republican)
- Governor of Maryland: Benjamin Ogle (Federalist)
- Governor of Massachusetts: Increase Sumner (Federalist) (until June 7), Moses Gill (no political party) (starting June 7)
- Governor of New Hampshire: John Taylor Gilman (Federalist)
- Governor of New Jersey: Richard Howell (Federalist)
- Governor of New York: John Jay (Federalist)
- Governor of North Carolina: William Richardson Davie (Federalist) (until November 23), Benjamin Williams (Federalist) (starting November 23)
- Governor of Pennsylvania: Thomas Mifflin (no political party) (until December 17), Thomas McKean (Democratic-Republican) (starting December 17)
- Governor of Rhode Island: Arthur Fenner (Country)
- Governor of South Carolina: Edward Rutledge (Democratic-Republican)
- Governor of Tennessee: John Sevier (Democratic-Republican)
- Governor of Vermont: Isaac Tichenor (Federalist)
- Governor of Virginia:
  - until December 1: James Wood (Democratic-Republican)
  - December 1 – 7: vacant
  - December 7 – 11: Hardin Burnley (no political party)
  - December 11 – 19: John Pendleton Jr. (no political party)
  - starting December 19: James Monroe (Democratic-Republican)

=== Lieutenant governors ===
- Lieutenant Governor of Connecticut: John Treadwell (Federalist)
- Lieutenant Governor of Massachusetts: Moses Gill (political party unknown)
- Lieutenant Governor of New York: Stephen Van Rensselaer (political party unknown)
- Lieutenant Governor of Rhode Island: Samuel J. Potter (Democratic-Republican) (until February), George Brown (political party unknown) (starting February)
- Lieutenant Governor of South Carolina: John Drayton (Democratic-Republican)
- Lieutenant Governor of Vermont: Paul Brigham (Democratic-Republican)

== Events ==
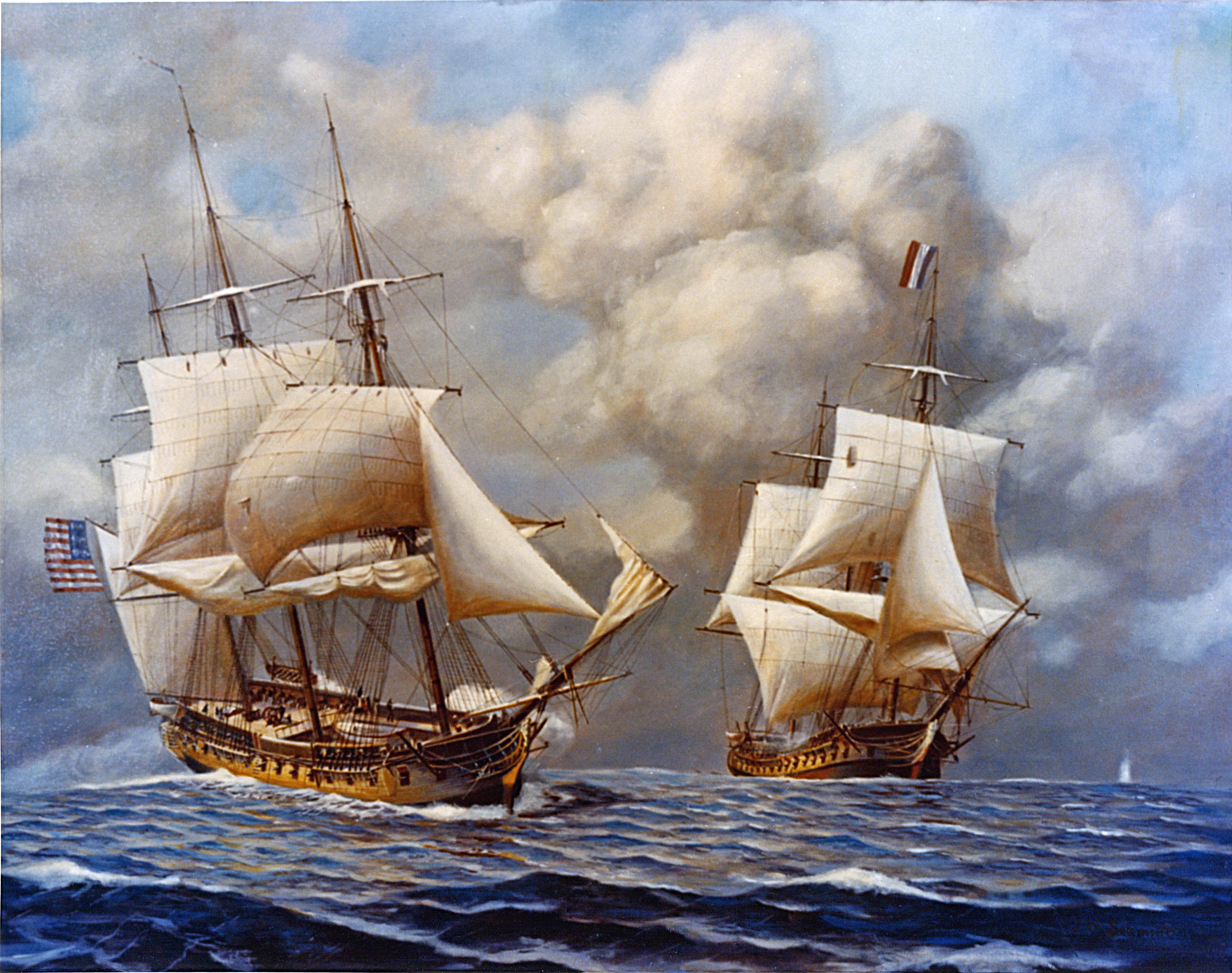
Action of 9 February 1799

- January 30 – Congress passes the Logan Act, forbidding unauthorized citizens from negotiating with foreign governments, in response to George Logan's unofficial attempt to negotiate peace between the U.S. and France.
- February – Fries's Rebellion, an armed tax revolt among Pennsylvania Dutch farmers, begins as John Fries organizes meetings to discuss a collective response to the taxes imposed to raise funds for the Quasi-War.
- February 7 – Marc Isambard Brunel leaves the United States.
- February 9 – Quasi-War: In the action of 9 February 1799, the USS Constellation captures the French frigate Insurgente.
- March 1 – Federalist James Ross becomes President pro tempore of the United States Senate.
- March 29 – New York passes a law aimed at gradually abolishing slavery in the state.
- April 10 – Ellicott's Stone is placed by a U.S.-Spanish survey party headed by Andrew Ellicott.
- July 8 – The Russian-American Company is founded.
- December 3 – The Kentucky state legislature passes the second of its resolutions as part of the Kentucky and Virginia Resolutions. Although the first of Kentucky's resolutions (in 1798) were authored by Thomas Jefferson, the author of the 1799 Resolutions is not known with certainty.
- December 14 – Former President George Washington dies at his home in Mount Vernon, Virginia.

=== Undated ===
- Carolina Gold Rush: 12-year-old Conrad John Reed finds what he describes as a "heavy yellow rock" along Little Meadow Creek in Cabarrus County, North Carolina and makes it a doorstop in his home. Conrad's father John Reed learns that the rock is actually gold in 1802, initiating the first gold rush in the U.S.
- Eli Whitney, holding a January 1798 U.S. government contract for the manufacture of muskets, is introduced by Oliver Wolcott Jr. to the French concept of interchangeable parts, an origin of the American system of manufacturing.
- Reconstruction of The Cabildo in New Orleans is completed.

=== Ongoing ===
- Quasi-War (1798–1800)

== Births ==
- January 6 – Jedediah Smith, explorer, hunter, trapper and fur trader (died 1831)
- March 8 – Simon Cameron, journalist, editor and 26th United States Secretary of War from 1861 to 1862 (died 1889)
- April 3 – John Pendleton King, U.S. Senator from Georgia from 1833 to 1837 (died 1888)
- April 12 – Samuel McRoberts, U.S. Senator from Illinois from 1841 to 1843 (died 1843)
- July 6 – Louisa Caroline Huggins Tuthill, writer for children (died 1879)
- July 19 – William McSherry, Jesuit priest (died 1839)
- September 10 – George Willison Adams, abolitionist (died 1879)
- October 1 – John Brown Russwurm, Americo-Liberian journalist and governor of the African Republic of Maryland (died 1851)
- October 3 – Oliver Bronson, physician and educator (died 1875)
- November 1 – Thomas Baldwin Marsh, religious leader (died 1866)
- November 15 – James A. Bayard Jr., U.S. Senator from Delaware from 1851 to 1864 (died 1880)
- November 29 – Amos Bronson Alcott, philosopher, educator and writer (died 1888)
- December 3 – Peggy Eaton, born Margaret O'Neill, wife of U.S. Secretary of State John Eaton and central character of the Petticoat affair (died 1879)
- December 27 – Walter T. Colquitt, U.S. Senator from Georgia from 1843 to 1848 (died 1855)

== Deaths ==
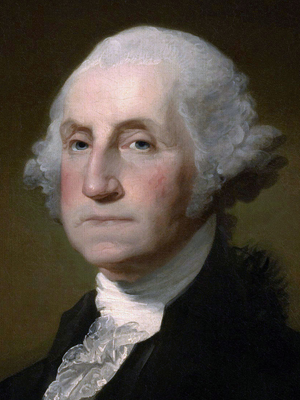
George Washington

- June 6 – Patrick Henry, first & sixth Governor of Virginia from 1776 to 1779 and from 1784 to 1786 (born 1736)
- June 7 – Increase Sumner, lawyer, justice and fifth Governor of Massachusetts from 1797 (born 1746)
- October 13 – William Paca, judge and third Governor of Maryland from 1782 to 1785, signatory to the Declaration of Independence (born 1740)
- December 14 – George Washington, first president of the United States from 1789 to 1797 (born 1732)
- December – William Cliffton, poet (born 1772)

== See also ==
- Timeline of United States history (1790–1819)
