= 1800 in the United States =

- Decades: 1780s; 1790s; 1800s; 1810s; 1820s
- See also: History of the United States (1789–1849); Timeline of United States history (1790–1819); List of years in the United States

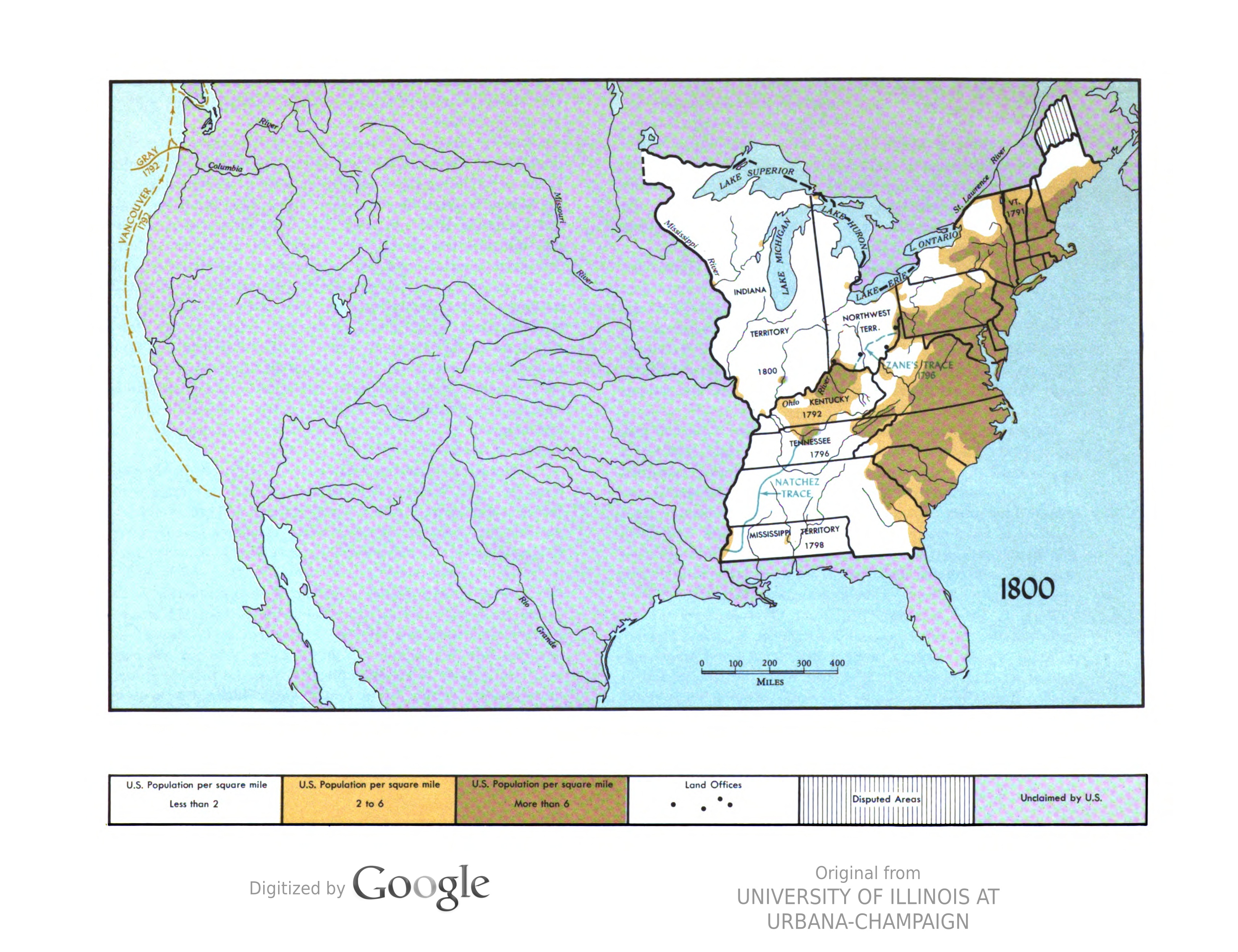
1800 in the United States showing Zane's Trace and the Natchez Trace

Events from the year 1800 in the United States.

== Incumbents ==
=== Federal government ===
- President: John Adams (F-Massachusetts)
- Vice President: Thomas Jefferson (DR-Virginia)
- Chief Justice: Oliver Ellsworth (Connecticut)
- Speaker of the House of Representatives: Theodore Sedgwick (F-Massachusetts)
- Congress: 6th

=== State governments ===
Governors and lieutenant governors

=== Governors ===
- Governor of Connecticut: Jonathan Trumbull, Jr. (Federalist)
- Governor of Delaware: Richard Bassett (Federalist)
- Governor of Georgia: James Jackson (Democratic-Republican)
- Governor of Kentucky: James Garrard (Democratic-Republican)
- Governor of Maryland: Benjamin Ogle (Federalist)
- Governor of Massachusetts:
  - until May 20: Moses Gill (no political party)
  - May 20 – 30: Governor's Council (no political party)
  - starting May 30: Caleb Strong (Federalist)
- Governor of New Hampshire: John Taylor Gilman (Federalist)
- Governor of New Jersey: Richard Howell (Federalist)
- Governor of New York: John Jay (Federalist)
- Governor of North Carolina: Benjamin Williams (Federalist)
- Governor of Pennsylvania: Thomas McKean (Democratic-Republican)
- Governor of Rhode Island: Arthur Fenner (Country)
- Governor of South Carolina: Edward Rutledge (Federalist) (until January 23), John Drayton (Democratic-Republican) (starting January 23)
- Governor of Tennessee: John Sevier (Democratic-Republican)
- Governor of Vermont: Isaac Tichenor (Federalist)
- Governor of Virginia: James Monroe (Democratic-Republican)

=== Lieutenant governors ===
- Lieutenant Governor of Connecticut: John Treadwell (Federalist)
- Lieutenant Governor of Kentucky: Alexander Scott Bullitt (political party unknown) (starting month and day unknown)
- Lieutenant Governor of Massachusetts: Moses Gill (political party unknown) (until month and day unknown), vacant (starting month and day unknown)
- Lieutenant Governor of New York: Stephen Van Rensselaer (political party unknown)
- Lieutenant Governor of Rhode Island: George Brown (political party unknown) (until month and day unknown), Samuel J. Potter (Democratic-Republican) (starting month and day unknown)
- Lieutenant Governor of South Carolina:
  - until January 23: John Drayton (Democratic-Republican)
  - January 23 – December 4: vacant
  - starting December 4: Richard Winn (Democratic-Republican)
- Lieutenant Governor of Vermont: Paul Brigham (Democratic-Republican)

== Events ==
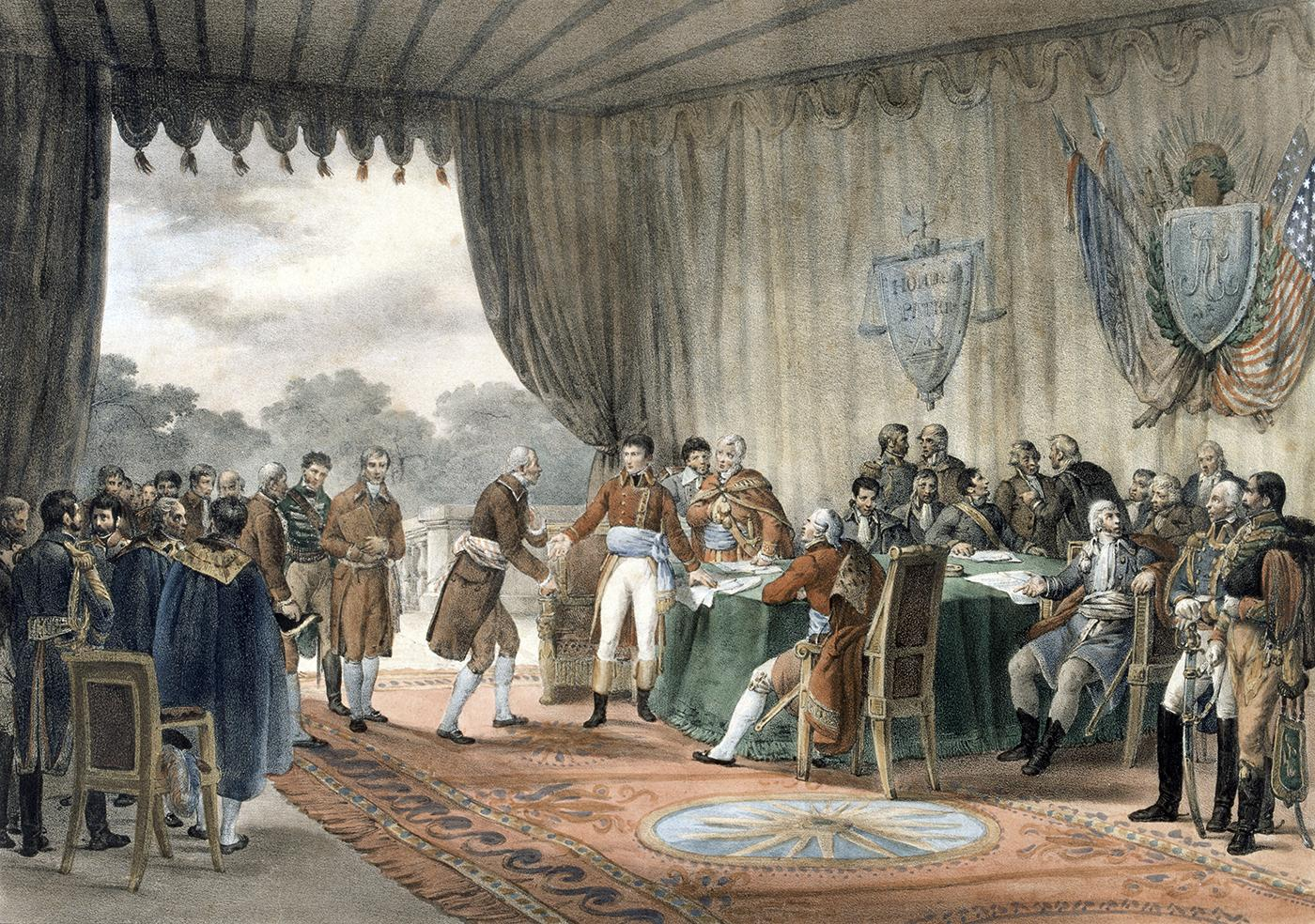
September 30: Treaty of Mortefontaine signed

- January 7 – The Virginia General Assembly adopts the Report of 1800, a resolution drafted by James Madison arguing for the sovereignty of the individual states under the United States Constitution and against the Alien and Sedition Acts.
- April – Voting begins in the 1800 United States presidential election; it will last until October. The result is not announced until February 1801.
- April 24 – The U.S. Library of Congress is founded.
- May 7 – Indiana Territory is formed by an Act of Congress as the first new territory created from the lands of the Northwest Territory.
- May 21 – President John Adams issues general amnesty for the Pennsylvania Dutch farmers who participated in Fries's Rebellion.
- July 4 – Indiana Territory is effective.
- July 10 – Connecticut cedes its Western Reserve (a strip in present-day northeastern Ohio) to the federal government, which adds it to the Northwest Territory.
- August 4 – The 2nd United States Census is conducted. It finds 5,308,483 people living in the U.S. of which 893,602 are slaves.
- August 30 – Gabriel Prosser's slave revolt in Richmond, Virginia is postponed due to weather. Word of his plan reaches Virginia's governor, James Monroe, who calls in the state militia. Gabriel is later captured and hanged on October 10 along with 23 other slaves.
- September 30 – The Convention of 1800, or Treaty of Mortefontaine, is signed between France and the United States of America, ending the Quasi-War.
- October 1 – In the Third Treaty of San Ildefonso, Spain returns Louisiana to France.
- November 1
  - U.S. President John Adams becomes the first president of the United States to live in the Executive Mansion (later renamed the White House).
  - Middlebury College is granted its charter by the Vermont General Assembly.
- November 17 – The U.S. Congress holds its first Washington, D.C. session.

=== Ongoing ===
- Quasi-War (1798–1800)
- Presidency of John Adams (March 4, 1797 – March 4, 1801)

== Publications ==
- "Parson" Weems' A History of the Life and Death, Virtues and Exploits of General George Washington.
- William Russell Birch's Birch's Views of Philadelphia

== Births ==
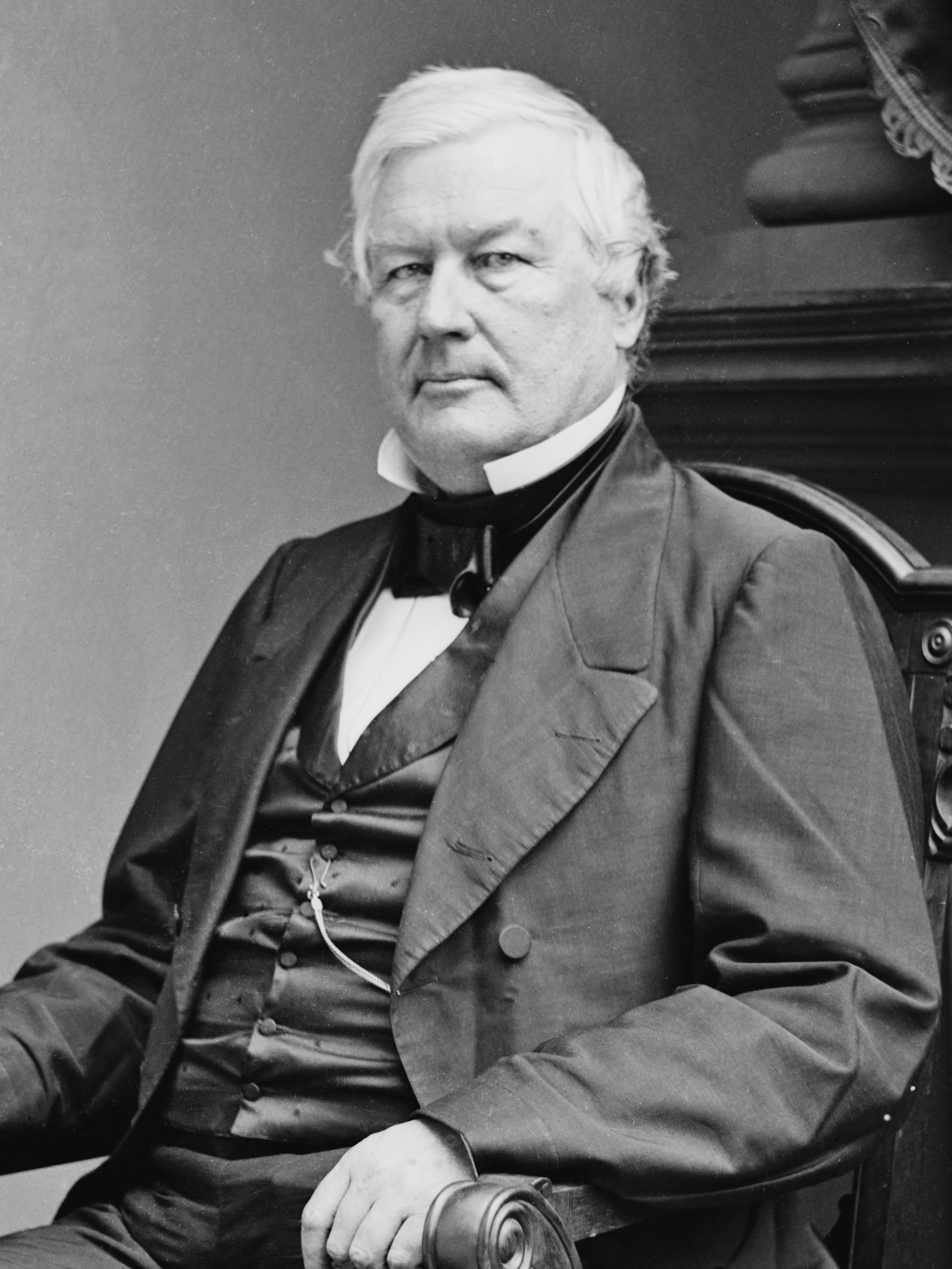
Millard Fillmore

- January 7 – Millard Fillmore, 13th president of the United States from 1850 till 1853, 12th vice president of the United States from 1849 till 1850. (died in 1874)
- February 14 – Emory Washburn, 22nd Governor of Massachusetts (died 1877)
- February 21 – John H. Winder, career United States Army officer, later Confederate general officer (died 1865)
- February 26 – Lucius Lyon, United States Senator from Michigan from 1843 till 1845. (died 1851)
- March 14 – James Bogardus, inventor and architect (died 1874)
- May 9 – John Brown, abolitionist (died 1859)
- July 15 – Sidney Breese, United States Senator from Illinois from 1843 till 1849. (died 1878)
- August 6 – Catharine Beecher, educator (died 1878)
- August 21 – Hiram Walden, United States Representative from New York (died 1880)
- August 22 – William S. Harney, United States Army Brigadier General (died 1889)
- September 11 – Daniel S. Dickinson, United States Senator from New York (died 1866)
- October 2 – Nat Turner, leader of slave rebellion (died 1831)
- October 3 – George Bancroft, historian (died 1891)
- October 27 – Benjamin Wade, United States Senator from Ohio (died 1878)
- October 30 – David Meriwether, United States Senator from Kentucky in 1852. (died 1893)
- December 29 – Charles Goodyear, inventor (died 1860)
- Eliza Seymour Lee, pastry chef and restaurateur (died 1874)

== Deaths ==
- January 13 – Dempsey Burges, Republican U.S. Congressman from North Carolina (born 1751)
- January 20 – Thomas Mifflin major general in the Continental Army, President of the Continental Congress, signatory of the Continental Association (born 1744)
- January 23 – Edward Rutledge, statesman (born 1749)
- February 2 – James C. Jarvis, United States Navy officer (born 1787)
- March 21 – William Blount, politician (born 1749)
- July 23 – John Rutledge, 2nd Chief Justice of the United States (born 1739)
- August 24 – Rawlins Lowndes, lawyer and jurist (born 1721)
- August 27 – John Barnwell, soldier and public official (born 1748)
- August 31 – John Blair Jr., American Founding Father (born 1732)
- September 26 – William Billings, choral composer (1746)
- October 7 – Henry Babcock, colonial American military officer (born 1736)
- October 10 – Gabriel Prosser, slave revolt leader (born 1776)
- October 16 - Benjamin Huntington, Delegate for Connecticut to the Continental Congress and member of the First United States Congress (born 1736)
- October 28 – Artemas Ward, Major General of the Continental Army and politician (born 1727)
- November 30 – Charles Adams, second son of John Adams, the 2nd president of the United States (born 1770)
- December 17 – William Peery, farmer, and lawyer (born 1743)
- Chief Blackbird, Omaha leader (born c. 1750)

== See also ==
- Timeline of United States history (1790–1819)
