= 1794 in the United States =

- Decades: 1770s; 1780s; 1790s; 1800s; 1810s
- See also: History of the United States (1789–1849); Timeline of United States history (1790–1819); List of years in the United States

Events from the year 1794 in the United States.

== Incumbents ==
=== Federal government ===
- President: George Washington (Independent-Virginia)
- Vice President: John Adams (Federalist Party-Massachusetts)
- Chief Justice: John Jay (New York)
- Speaker of the House of Representatives: Frederick Muhlenberg (Anti-Admin.-Pennsylvania)
- Congress: 3rd

==== State governments ====
Governors and lieutenant governors

=== Governors ===
- Governor of Connecticut: Samuel Huntington (Federalist)
- Governor of Delaware: Joshua Clayton (Federalist)
- Governor of Georgia: George Mathews (Democratic-Republican)
- Governor of Kentucky: Issac Shelby (Democratic-Republican)
- Governor of Maryland: Thomas Sim Lee (Federalist) (until November 14), John Hoskins Stone (Federalist) (starting November 14)
- Governor of Massachusetts: Samuel Adams (no political party)
- Governor of New Hampshire: Josiah Bartlett (Democratic-Republican) (until June 5), John Taylor Gilman (Democratic-Republican) (starting June 5)
- Governor of New Jersey: Richard Howell (Federalist)
- Governor of New York: George Clinton (Democratic-Republican)
- Governor of North Carolina: Richard Dobbs Spaight (Federalist)
- Governor of Pennsylvania: Thomas Mifflin (no political party)
- Governor of Rhode Island: Arthur Fenner (Country)
- Governor of South Carolina: William Moultrie (Federalist) (until December 17), Arnoldus Vanderhorst (Federalist) (starting December 17)
- Governor of Vermont: Thomas Chittenden (no political party)
- Governor of Virginia: Henry Lee III (Federalist) (until December 1), Robert Brooke (Democratic-Republican) (starting December 1)

=== Lieutenant governors ===
- Lieutenant Governor of Connecticut: Oliver Wolcott (Federalist)
- Lieutenant Governor of Massachusetts: Samuel Adams (Democratic-Republican) (until month and day unknown), Moses Gill (political party unknown) (starting month and day unknown)
- Lieutenant Governor of New York: Pierre Van Cortlandt (political party unknown)
- Lieutenant Governor of Rhode Island: Samuel J. Potter (Democratic-Republican)
- Lieutenant Governor of South Carolina: James Ladson (Federalist) (until December 17), Lewis Morris (Federalist) (starting December 17)
- Lieutenant Governor of Vermont: Peter Olcott (political party unknown) (until month and day unknown), Jonathan Hunt (political party unknown) (starting month and day unknown)

== Events ==
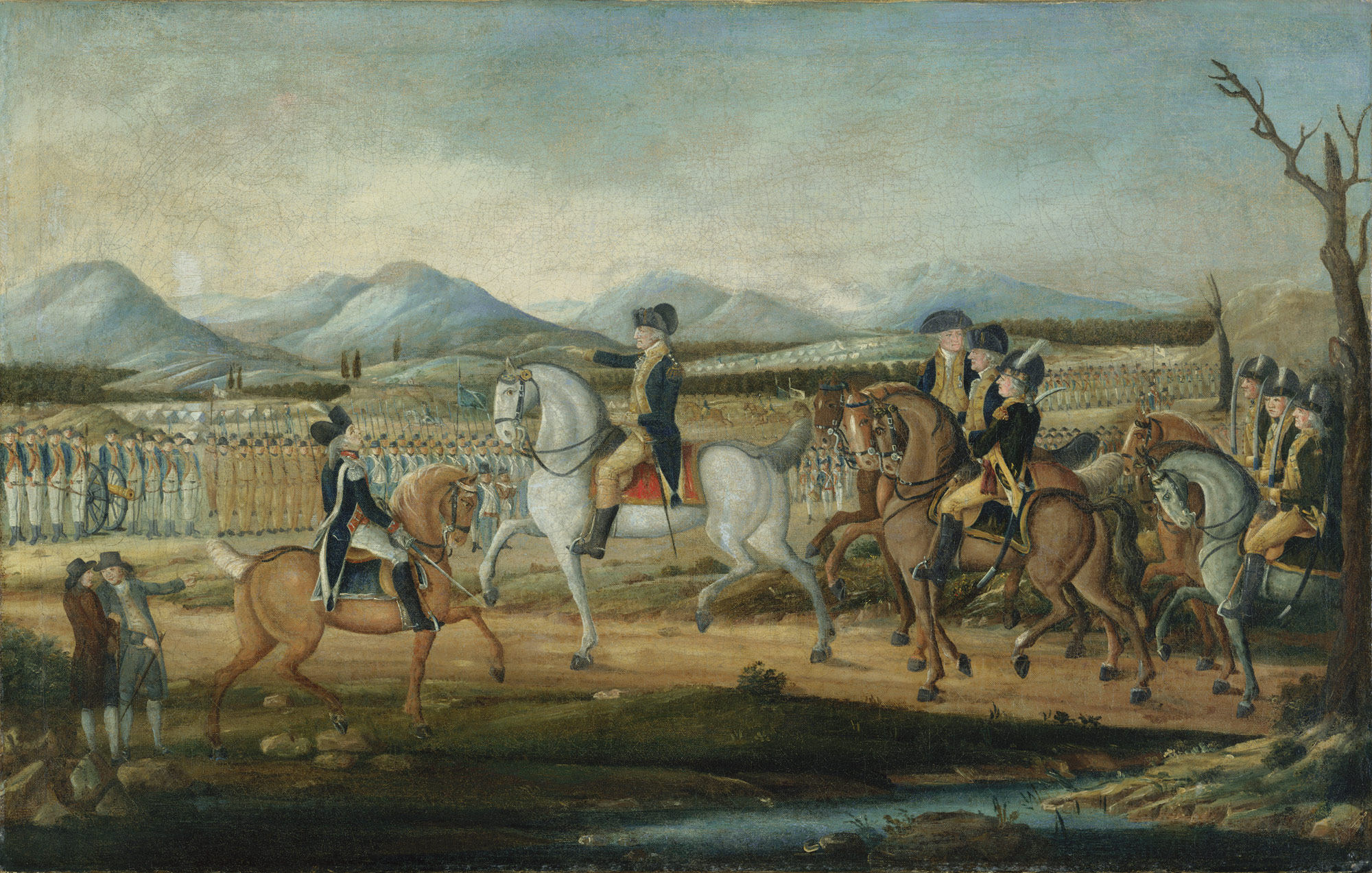
October 14: Washington reviews the army assembled against the Whiskey Rebellion

- January 13 – The U.S. Congress enacts a law providing for, effective May 1, 1795, a United States flag of 15 stars and 15 stripes, in recognition of the recent admission of Vermont and Kentucky as the 14th and 15th states. A subsequent act restores the number of stripes to 13, but provides for additional stars upon the admission of each additional state.
- February 11 – The first session of the United States Senate is open to the public.
- March 14 – Eli Whitney is granted a patent for the cotton gin.
- March 27 – The United States Government authorizes the building of the first six United States Navy vessels (in 1797 the first 3 frigates, USS United States, USS Constellation and USS Constitution go into service), not to be confused with October 13, 1775, which is observed as the Navy's Birthday.
- July 17 – Whiskey Rebellion: 500 armed Pennsylvanians attack and burn the home of General John Neville.
- August 7 – Whiskey Rebellion: President Washington invokes the Militia Acts of 1792 mobilize a federal army of 12,500 men. The force would later be put under the command of General "Light Horse Harry" Lee to be led into western Pennsylvania against the insurrection.
- September 10 – The University of Tennessee is established at Knoxville.
- November – Whiskey Rebellion: The federal army quells the uprising and begins the return march to Philadelphia with prisoners.
- November 19 – The United States and Great Britain sign the Jay Treaty (coming into effect 1796), which attempts to clear up some issues left over from the American Revolutionary War and secures a decade of peaceful trade between the two nations. Britain agrees to evacuate border forts in the Northwest Territory (roughly the area north of the Ohio River and east of the Mississippi) and thereby end British support for the Indians.
- December 8 – The Great New Orleans Fire (1794) burns over 200 buildings in the French Quarter.
- December 23 – St. Louis Cathedral, New Orleans is dedicated.

=== Undated ===
- Thomas Paine's The Age of Reason, dedicated to "Fellow Citizens of the United States of America", is published.
- Springfield Armory is founded, one of the most universally known and influential gun producers in the United States.

=== Ongoing ===
- Northwest Indian War (1785–1795)
- Nickajack Expedition, conflict between White frontiersmen and the Chickamauga Cherokee

== Births ==
- March 16 – Lawrence Brainerd, U.S. Senator from Vermont from 1854 to 1855 (died 1870)
- April 10
  - Matthew C. Perry, commodore (died 1858)
  - John McCracken Robinson, U.S. Senator from Illinois from 1830 to 1841 (died 1843)
- April 11 – Edward Everett, politician (died 1865)
- May 27 – Cornelius Vanderbilt, entrepreneur (died 1877)
- June 7 – Elias Kane, U.S. Senator from Illinois from 1825 to 1835 (died 1835)
- July 5 – Sylvester Graham, nutritionist and inventor (died 1851)
- August 10 – Jackson Morton, U.S. Senator from Florida from 1849 to 1855 (died 1874)
- October 6 – Charles Wilkins Short, botanist (died 1863)
- October 22 – Carlos Wilcox, poet (died 1827)
- October 23 – Oliver H. Smith, U.S. Senator from Indiana from 1837 to 1843 (died 1859)
- November 3 – William Cullen Bryant, romantic poet, journalist and long-time editor of the New York Evening Post (died 1878)
- November 10 – Alexander O. Anderson, U.S. Senator from Tennessee from 1840 to 1841 (died 1869)
- Date unknown – Arthur P. Bagby, U.S. Senator from Alabama from 1837 to 1841 (died 1858)
- Approximate date – Maria Gowen Brooks, born Abigail Gowen, poet (died 1845)

== Deaths ==
- September 15 – Abraham Clark, American signer of the Declaration of Independence (b. 1725)
- June 19 – Richard Henry Lee, 12th president of the Confederation Congress. signatory of the Continental Association, Declaration of Independence, and United States Constitution (b. 1732)
- November 15 – John Witherspoon, American signer of the Declaration of Independence (b. 1723)
- November 22 – John Alsop, American Continental Congressman (b. 1724)

== See also ==
- Timeline of United States history (1790–1819)
