= 1793 in the United States =

- Decades: 1770s; 1780s; 1790s; 1800s; 1810s
- See also: History of the United States (1789–1849); Timeline of United States history (1790–1819); List of years in the United States

Events from the year 1793 in the United States.

== Incumbents ==
=== Federal government ===
- President: George Washington (Independent-Virginia)
- Vice President: John Adams (F-Massachusetts)
- Chief Justice: John Jay (originally from New York)
- Speaker of the House of Representatives:

Jonathan Trumbull, Jr. (Pro-Admin.-Connecticut) (until March 4)
Frederick Muhlenberg (Anti-Admin.-Pennsylvania) (starting December 2)

- Congress: 2nd (until March 4), 3rd (starting March 4)

==== State governments ====
Governors and lieutenant governors

=== Governors ===
- Governor of Connecticut: Samuel Huntington (Federalist)
- Governor of Delaware: Joshua Clayton (Federalist)
- Governor of Georgia: Edward Telfair (Democratic-Republican) (until November 7), George Mathews (starting November 7)
- Governor of Kentucky: Issac Shelby (Democratic-Republican)
- Governor of Maryland: Thomas Sim Lee (Democratic-Republican)
- Governor of Massachusetts: John Hancock (no political party) (until October 8), Samuel Adams (no political party) (starting October 8)
- Governor of New Hampshire: Josiah Bartlett (Democratic-Republican)
- Governor of New Jersey:
  - until March 30: William Paterson (Federalist)
  - March 30-June 3: Thomas Henderson (Federalist)
  - starting June 3: Richard Howell (Federalist)
- Governor of New York: George Clinton (Democratic-Republican)
- Governor of North Carolina: Richard Dobbs Spaight (Federalist)
- Governor of Pennsylvania: Thomas Mifflin (no political party)
- Governor of Rhode Island: Arthur Fenner (Country)
- Governor of South Carolina: William Moultrie (Federalist)
- Governor of Vermont: Thomas Chittenden (no political party)
- Governor of Virginia: Henry Lee III (Federalist)

=== Lieutenant governors ===
- Lieutenant Governor of Connecticut: Oliver Wolcott (Federalist)
- Lieutenant Governor of Massachusetts: Samuel Adams (Democratic-Republican)
- Lieutenant Governor of New York: Pierre Van Cortlandt (political party unknown)
- Lieutenant Governor of Rhode Island: Samuel J. Potter (Democratic-Republican)
- Lieutenant Governor of South Carolina: James Ladson (Federalist)
- Lieutenant Governor of Vermont: Peter Olcott (political party unknown)

== Events ==
=== January–March ===
- January 9 – Jean-Pierre Blanchard becomes the first to fly in a gas balloon in the Western Hemisphere, from Walnut Street Jail in Philadelphia to Deptford Township, New Jersey. George Washington, John Adams, Thomas Jefferson, James Madison and James Monroe are among the spectators.
- February – In Manchester, Vermont, the wife of a captain falls ill, probably with tuberculosis. Some locals believe that the cause of her illness is that a demon vampire is sucking her blood. As a cure, Timothy Mead burns the heart of a deceased person in front of a crowd of a few hundred.
- February 12 – The Fugitive Slave Act is passed by Congress as the first of the federal fugitive slave laws under the U.S. Constitution.
- February 25 – George Washington holds the first Cabinet meeting as President of the United States.
- February 27 – The Giles resolutions are introduced to the United States House of Representatives, asking the House to condemn Alexander Hamilton's handling of loans.
- March 1 – John Langdon becomes President pro tempore of the United States Senate until March 3.
- March 4 – President George Washington and Vice President John Adams are sworn in for their second term, in Philadelphia.

=== April–June ===
- April 9 – Edmond-Charles Genêt, France's new Minister to the United States, arrives at Charleston, South Carolina.
- April 22 – George Washington signs the Neutrality Proclamation.
- June 21 – The town of Hamilton, Massachusetts, is incorporated.

=== July–September ===
- July 9 – The Constitution of Vermont is adopted.
- August 1 – The yellow fever epidemic of 1793 starts in Philadelphia, Pennsylvania.
- September 18 – United States Capitol cornerstone laying: President George Washington lays the cornerstone for the United States Capitol in Washington, D.C.

=== October–December ===
- October 12 – The cornerstone of Old East, the oldest state university building in the United States, is laid in Chapel Hill, North Carolina, on the campus of the University of North Carolina (the 12th of October is subsequently celebrated at the university as University Day).
- October 28 – Eli Whitney applies for patent for his cotton gin (the patent is granted the following March).
- November 9 – George Washington visits Philadelphia to announce end of the yellow fever epidemic in Philadelphia; around 5,000 people have been killed by the fever.
- December 9 – New York City's first daily newspaper, the American Minerva, is established by Noah Webster.

=== Undated ===
- Hannah Slater applies to patent a new method of producing sewing thread from cotton.
- The first year of regular production begins for the United States Mint in Philadelphia and the half cent is minted for the first time.
- Lawrence Academy (Groton, Massachusetts) is chartered.
- Slater Mill is completed in Pawtucket, Rhode Island, as the first water-powered cotton spinning mill in North America to utilize the Arkwright system of cotton spinning as developed by Samuel Slater.

=== Ongoing ===
- Northwest Indian War (1785–1795)

== Births ==
- January 3 – Lucretia Mott, women's rights activist and abolitionist (died 1880)
- January 4 – Roger Sherman Baldwin, U.S. Senator from Connecticut from 1847 to 1851 (died 1863)
- January 14 – John C. Clark, politician (died 1852)
- February 9 – James Long, Filibuster and founder of the Long Republic - the first "Republic of Texas". (died 1822)
- March 2 – Sam Houston, President of the Republic of Texas (died 1863)
- June 6 – Edward C. Delavan, temperance leader (died 1871)
- July 15 – Almira Hart Lincoln Phelps, American educator, scientist and writer (died 1884)
- July 19 – Thomas Doughty, landscape painter (died 1856)
- August 25 – John Neal, writer, critic, editor, lecturer, and activist (died 1876)
- October 28 – Eliphalet Remington, gunmaker (died 1861)
- November 3 – Stephen F. Austin, empresario (died 1836)
- December 15 – Henry Charles Carey, economist (died 1879)
- Date unknown
  - Sandy Cornish, freed slave and farmer (died 1869)
  - John Slidell, U.S. Senator from Louisiana from 1853 to 1861 (died 1871 in the United Kingdom)

== Deaths ==
- July 23 – Roger Sherman, lawyer, statesman and signatory of the Declaration of Independence (born 1721)
- October 8 – John Hancock, businessman, smuggler, statesman, patriot and signatory of the Declaration of Independence (born 1737)
- Date unknown – Philip Phile, violinist and composer (born c.1734 in Germany)

== See also ==
- Timeline of United States history (1790–1819)
