= 1798 in the United States =

- Decades: 1770s; 1780s; 1790s; 1800s; 1810s
- See also: History of the United States (1789–1849); Timeline of United States history (1790–1819); List of years in the United States

Events from the year 1798 in the United States.

== Incumbents ==
=== Federal government ===
- President: John Adams (F-Massachusetts)
- Vice President: Thomas Jefferson (DR-Virginia)
- Chief Justice: Oliver Ellsworth (Connecticut)
- Speaker of the House of Representatives: Jonathan Dayton (F-New Jersey)
- Congress: 5th

==== State governments ====
Governors and lieutenant governors

=== Governors ===
- Governor of Connecticut: Jonathan Trumbull, Jr. (Federalist)
- Governor of Delaware: Daniel Rogers (Federalist)
- Governor of Georgia: Jared Irwin (Democratic-Republican) (until January 12), James Jackson (Democratic-Republican) (starting January 12)
- Governor of Kentucky: James Garrard (Democratic-Republican)
- Governor of Maryland: John Henry (Democratic-Republican) (until November 14), Benjamin Ogle (Federalist) (starting November 14)
- Governor of Massachusetts: Increase Sumner (Federalist)
- Governor of New Hampshire: John Taylor Gilman (Anti-Federalist)
- Governor of New Jersey: Richard Howell (Federalist)
- Governor of New York: John Jay (Federalist)
- Governor of North Carolina: Samuel Ashe (Anti-Federalist) (until December 7), William Richardson Davie (Federalist) (starting December 7)
- Governor of Pennsylvania: Thomas Mifflin (no political party)
- Governor of Rhode Island: Arthur Fenner (Country)
- Governor of South Carolina: Charles Pinckney (Democratic-Republican)
- Governor of Tennessee: John Sevier (Democratic-Republican)
- Governor of Vermont: Isaac Tichenor (Federalist)
- Governor of Virginia: James Wood (Democratic-Republican)

=== Lieutenant governors ===
- Lieutenant Governor of Connecticut: John Treadwell (Federalist)
- Lieutenant Governor of Massachusetts: Moses Gill (political party unknown)
- Lieutenant Governor of New York: Stephen Van Rensselaer (political party unknown)
- Lieutenant Governor of Rhode Island: Samuel J. Potter (Democratic-Republican)
- Lieutenant Governor of South Carolina: Robert Anderson (Democratic-Republican) (until December 18), John Drayton (Democratic-Republican) (starting December 18)
- Lieutenant Governor of Vermont: Paul Brigham (Democratic-Republican)

== Events ==
- January – Eli Whitney contracts with the U.S. federal government for 10,000 rifles, which he will produce with interchangeable parts.
- January 8 – 11th Amendment ratified after two states are ratified.
- February 17 – Federalist Congressman Roger Griswold of Connecticut attacks Vermont Representative Matthew Lyon with a walking stick in the chambers of the United States House of Representatives.
- March – The XYZ Affair begins, souring relations between the United States and France.
- April – U.S. House of Representatives elections begin in New York and continue into 1799.
- April 7 – The Mississippi Territory is organized from territory ceded by Georgia and South Carolina and is later twice expanded to include disputed territory claimed by both the U.S. and Spain.
- July 7
  - Quasi-War: The United States Congress rescinds treaties with France, sparking the war.
  - In the action of USS Delaware vs La Croyable, the newly formed United States Navy makes its first capture.
- July 9 – Quasi-War: The Act Further to Protect the Commerce of the United States is approved by Congress, authorizing the President to use military force against France.
- July 11 – The United States Marine Corps is established by Congress (the Marine Corps had existed prior, see history of the United States Marine Corps).
- July 14 – The Alien and Sedition Acts become United States law, making it a federal crime to write, publish, or utter false or malicious statements about the United States government.
- July 16 – The Relief of Sick and Disabled Seamen Act is signed into law, creating the Marine Hospital Service, the forerunner to the current United States Public Health Service Commissioned Corps.
- September – Charles Brockden Brown publishes the first significant American novel, the Gothic fiction Wieland: or, The Transformation; an American Tale.
- October 2 – The Treaty of Tellico is signed between the United States and the Cherokee Nation.
- November 16 – The Kentucky state legislature passes the first of the Kentucky and Virginia Resolutions, authored by Thomas Jefferson.
- December 24 – The Virginia state legislature passes the second of the Kentucky and Virginia Resolutions, authored by James Madison.

=== Ongoing ===
- Quasi-War (1798–1800)
- XYZ Affair (1797–1798)
- The Irish Rebellion of 1798 fails, triggering a mass migration of Ulster Presbyterians to the United States.

== Births ==
- January 4 – William Crosby Dawson, United States Senator from Georgia from 1849 till 1855. (died 1856)
- January 5 – James Semple, United States Senator from Illinois from 1843 till 1847. (died 1866)
- January 18 – Augustus Seymour Porter, United States Senator from Michigan from 1840 till 1845. (died 1872)
- February 20 – Richard M. Young, United States Senator from Illinois from 1837 till 1843. (died 1861)
- March 4 – John Joseph Abercrombie, Union Army brigadier general (died 1877)
- March 13 – Abigail Fillmore, wife of Millard Fillmore, First Lady of the United States, Second Lady of the United States (died 1853)
- June 12 – Samuel Cooper, United States Army officer during the Second Seminole War and the Mexican–American War, highest-ranking Confederate general during the American Civil War (died 1876)
- June 25 – Sophia Dallas, wife of George M. Dallas, Second Lady of the United States (died 1869)
- December 3 – Alfred Iverson, Sr., United States Senator from Georgia from 1855 till 1861. (died 1873)

== Deaths ==
- March 22 – Justin Morgan, horse breeder and composer (born 1747)
- June 20 – Jeremy Belknap, historian of New Hampshire (born 1744)
- July 20 – Anna Gardie, dancer and actress, murdered (born c. 1760)
- August 18 – John Lewis Gervais, Revolutionary, member of Provincial Congress 1775, State's Committee of Safety from 1775 to 1781, South Carolina's Senate in 1781 and 1782, Continental Congress 1782 and 1783 (born 1741)
- August 21 – James Wilson, politician (born 1742)
- September 10 – Benjamin Franklin Bache, journalist (born 1769)
- September 21 – George Read, lawyer and signatory of the Declaration of Independence (born 1733)

== See also ==
- Timeline of United States history (1790–1819)
