= 1843 in the United States =

- Decades: 1820s; 1830s; 1840s; 1850s; 1860s
- See also: History of the United States (1789–1849); Timeline of the history of the United States (1820-1859); List of years in the United States

Events from the year 1843 in the United States.

== Incumbents ==
=== Federal government ===
- President: John Tyler (I-Virginia)
- Vice President: vacant
- Chief Justice: Roger B. Taney (Maryland)
- Speaker of the House of Representatives:

John White (W-Kentucky) (until March 4)
John Winston Jones (D-Virginia) (starting December 4)

- Congress: 27th (until March 4), 28th (starting March 4)

==== State governments ====
Governors and lieutenant governors

=== Governors ===
- Governor of Alabama: Benjamin Fitzpatrick (Democratic)
- Governor of Arkansas: Archibald Yell (Democratic)
- Governor of Connecticut: Chauncey Fitch Cleveland (Democratic)
- Governor of Delaware: William B. Cooper (Whig)
- Governor of Georgia: Charles J. McDonald (Democratic) (until November 8), George W. Crawford (Whig) (starting November 8)
- Governor of Illinois: Thomas Ford (Democratic)
- Governor of Indiana: Samuel Bigger (Whig) (until December 6), James Whitcomb (Democratic) (starting December 6)
- Governor of Kentucky: Robert P. Letcher (Whig)
- Governor of Louisiana: André B. Roman (Whig) (until January 30), Alexandre Mouton (Democratic) (starting January 30)
- Governor of Maine: John Fairfield (Democratic) (until March 7), Edward Kavanagh (Democratic) (starting March 7)
- Governor of Maryland: Francis Thomas (Democratic)
- Governor of Massachusetts: John Davis (Whig) (until January 17), Marcus Morton (Democratic) (starting January 17)
- Governor of Michigan: John S. Barry (Democratic)
- Governor of Mississippi: Tilghman Tucker (Democratic)
- Governor of Missouri: Thomas Reynolds (Democratic)
- Governor of New Hampshire: Henry Hubbard (Democratic)
- Governor of New Jersey: William Pennington (Whig) (until October 27), Daniel Haines (Democratic) (starting October 27)
- Governor of New York: William C. Bouck (Democratic) (starting January 1)
- Governor of North Carolina: John Motley Morehead (Whig)
- Governor of Ohio: Wilson Shannon (Democratic)
- Governor of Pennsylvania: David R. Porter (Democratic)
- Governor of Rhode Island: Samuel Ward King (Rhode Island) (until May 2), James Fenner (Law and Order) (starting May 2)
- Governor of South Carolina: James Henry Hammond (Democratic)
- Governor of Tennessee: James C. Jones (Whig)
- Governor of Vermont: Charles Paine (Whig) (until October 13), John Mattocks (Whig) (starting October 13)
- Governor of Virginia: John Munford Gregory (Whig) (until January 1), James McDowell (Democratic) (starting January 1)

=== Lieutenant governors ===
- Lieutenant Governor of Connecticut: William S. Holabird (Democratic)
- Lieutenant Governor of Illinois: John Moore (Democratic)
- Lieutenant Governor of Indiana: Samuel Hall (Whig) (until December 6), Jesse D. Bright (Democratic) (starting December 6)
- Lieutenant Governor of Kentucky: Manlius Valerius Thomson (political party unknown)
- Lieutenant Governor of Massachusetts: George Hull (Whig) (until January 17), Henry H. Childs (Democratic-Republican) (starting January 17)
- Lieutenant Governor of Michigan: Origen D. Richardson (Whig)
- Lieutenant Governor of Missouri: Meredith Miles Marmaduke (Democratic)
- Lieutenant Governor of New York: Daniel S. Dickinson (Democratic) (starting January 1)
- Lieutenant Governor of Rhode Island: Nathaniel Bullock (political party unknown) (until May 2), Byron Diman (political party unknown) (starting May 2)
- Lieutenant Governor of South Carolina: Isaac Donnom Witherspoon (Democratic)
- Lieutenant Governor of Vermont: Waitstill R. Ranney (Whig) (until October 13), Horace Eaton (Whig) (starting October 13)

== Events ==
=== January–March ===
- January – Edgar Allan Poe's short story "The Tell-Tale Heart" is first published.
- February 6 – The Virginia Minstrels perform the first minstrel show (Bowery Amphitheatre, New York City).
- March 21 – The world does not end, contrary to the first prediction by American preacher William Miller.

=== April–June ===
- April 30–May 16 – Naval Battle of Campeche: Naval Battle between the Mexican Navy versus the Texas Navy and the Yucatán Navy. The battle features the most advanced warships of its day.
- May 7 – Nakahama Manjirō lands in New Bedford, Massachusetts, the first known Japanese in the United States.
- May 22 – The first major wagon train for the American Northwest sets out with one thousand pioneers from Elm Grove, Missouri on the Oregon Trail.
- June 1–December – Fruitlands (transcendental center) in Harvard, Massachusetts, led by Bronson Alcott and Charles Lane, functions

=== July–September ===
- July 1 – Ulysses S. Grant graduates from West Point 21st from a class of 39.
- July 12 – Origin of Latter Day Saint polygamy: Joseph Smith, founder of the Latter Day Saint movement, receives a revelation recommending polygamy.
- August 19 – Edgar Allan Poe's short story "The Black Cat" is first published, in The Saturday Evening Post.
- August 23 – Mexican President Antonio López de Santa Anna announces that the annexation of Texas by the United States would be considered an act of war by Mexico.

=== October–December ===
- October – College of the Holy Cross opens as a boys' school in Worcester, Massachusetts, the first Jesuit college in New England.
- October 13 – In New York City, Henry Jones and 11 others found B'nai B'rith, the oldest Jewish service organization in the world.
- November 28 – Ka La Ku'oko'a (Hawaiian Independence Day): The Kingdom of Hawai`i is officially recognized by the United Kingdom of Great Britain and Ireland and July Monarchy France as an independent nation.
- December 1 – Benjamin Fitzpatrick is sworn in for his second term as the 11th governor of Alabama.
- December 19 – "A Christmas Carol", by Charles Dickens, was first published on December 19, 1843, with the first edition sold out by Christmas Eve. By 1844, the novella had gone through 13 printings and continues to be a robust seller more than 175 years later.

=== Undated ===
- Saint Louis University School of Law becomes the first law school west of the Mississippi River
- Abbeville, Louisiana is founded by descendants of Acadians from Nova Scotia.

== Births ==
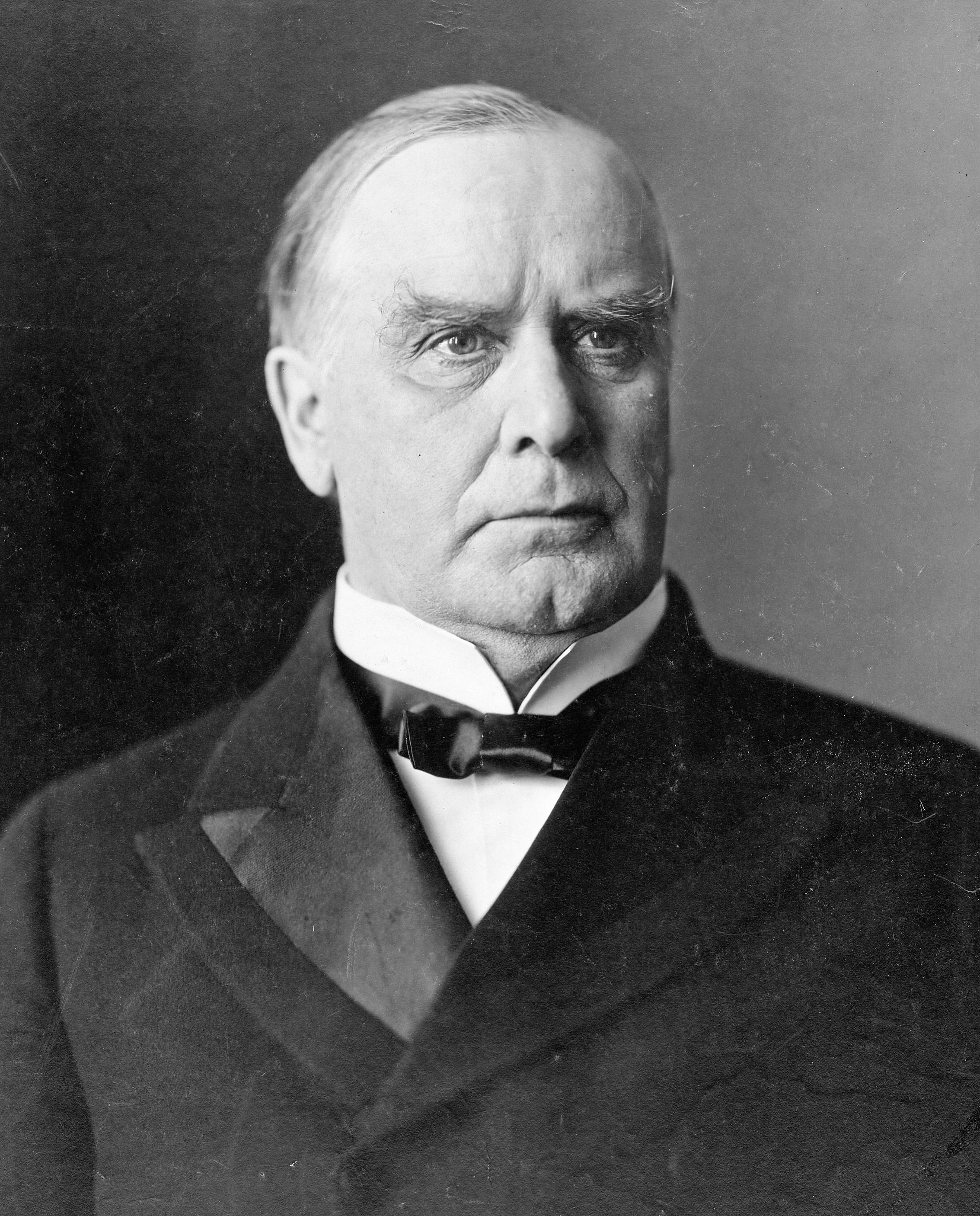
William McKinley

- January 6 – John Coit Spooner, politician (died 1919)
- January 8
  - John H. Moffitt, politician (died 1926)
  - Letitia Stevenson, wife of Adlai Stevenson I, Second Lady of the United States (died 1913)
- January 10 – Frank James, outlaw (died 1915)
- January 15 – William H. Harries, Representative in the United States House of Representatives from Minnesota (died 1921)
- January 16 – George E. Gard, sheriff (died 1904)
- January 29 – William McKinley, 25th president of the United States from 1897 to 1901 (died 1901)
- February 2 – Knute Nelson, Norway-born 12th governor of Minnesota from 1893 to 1895 and U.S. Senator from Minnesota from 1895 to 1923 (died 1923)
- February 3 – William Cornelius Van Horne, North American railway magnate (died 1915 in Canada)
- February 7 – John B. Babcock, U.S. Army officer (died 1909)
- February 9 – Andrew Traynor, soldier (died 1920)
- February 15 – Russell Conwell, Baptist minister (died 1925)
- February 27
  - Thomas Hammond, politician (died 1909)
  - Thomas Lowry, lawyer and businessman (died 1909)
- March 8 – Arthur Brown, U.S. Senator from Utah from 1896 to 1897 (died 1906)
- March 17 – Henry Ware Lawton, general (died 1899)
- March 23 – Joseph F. Johnston, U.S. Senator from Alabama from 1907 to 1913 (died 1913)
- April 4 – William Henry Jackson, explorer and photographer (died 1942)
- April 8 – Howard Roberts, sculptor (died 1900)
- April 15 – Henry James, fiction writer (died 1916)
- May 6 – G. K. Gilbert, geologist (died 1918)
- June 4 – Charles Conrad Abbott, archaeologist and naturalist (died 1919)
- June 6 – Russell J. Waters, U.S. Representative from California (died 1911)
- April 25 – Dwight M. Sabin, U.S. Senator from Minnesota from 1883 to 1889 (died 1902)
- July 15 – Alfred W. Benson, U.S. Senator from Kansas from 1906 to 1907 (died 1916)
- July 19 – Francis J. Higginson, U.S. Navy admiral (died 1931)
- June 29 – Charles Warren Stone, member of the U.S. House of Representatives from Pennsylvania (died 1912)
- August 1 – Robert Todd Lincoln, statesman and businessman, son of Abraham Lincoln (died 1926)
- August 19 – C. I. Scofield, theologian (died 1921)
- September 25 – Melville Reuben Bissell, entrepreneur, inventor of the Carpet sweeper (died 1889)
- October 28 – Julia Anna Orum, educator, lecturer, and author (died 1904)
- November 23 – Henry C. Payne, politician (died 1904)
- November 25 – Henry Ware Eliot, industrialist and philanthropist (died 1919)
- November 26 – Charles A. Chickering, representative of New York (died 1900)
- November 27 – Cornelius Vanderbilt II, railroad magnate (died 1899)
- November 30 – Martha Ripley, physician (died 1912)
- December 28 – Prentiss Ingraham, military officer and author of dime fiction (died 1904)

== Deaths ==
- January 11 – Francis Scott Key, author of "The Star-Spangled Banner" (born 1779)
- March 27 – Samuel McRoberts, U.S. Senator from Illinois from 1841 to 1843 (born 1799)
- March 31 – George A. Waggaman, U.S. Senator from Louisiana from 1831 to 1835 (born 1782)
- April 1 – John Armstrong Jr., 7th United States Secretary of War (born 1758)
- April 17 – Samuel Morey, inventor (born 1762)
- April 25 – John McCracken Robinson, U.S. Senator from Illinois from 1830 to 1841 (born 1794)
- May 28 – Noah Webster, lexicographer (born 1758)
- July 7 – John Holmes, Maine politician (born 1773)
- July 9 – Washington Allston, painter, the "American Titian", and poet (born 1779)
- August – Sequoyah, creator of the Cherokee syllabary (b. c. 1767)
- August 10 – Robert Adrain, mathematician (born 1775 in Ireland)
- September 11 – Joseph Nicollet, geographer (born 1786 in France)
- September 30 – Richard Harlan, zoologist (born 1796)
- November 10 – John Trumbull, painter (born 1756)

== See also ==
- Timeline of United States history (1820–1859)
