= 1795 in the United States =

- Decades: 1770s; 1780s; 1790s; 1800s; 1810s
- See also: History of the United States (1789–1849); Timeline of United States history (1790–1819); List of years in the United States

Events from the year 1795 in the United States.

== Incumbents ==
=== Federal government ===
- President: George Washington (Independent-Virginia)
- Vice President: John Adams (F-Massachusetts)
- Chief Justice:

John Jay (New York)
John Rutledge (South Carolina)

- Speaker of the House of Representatives:

Frederick Muhlenberg (Anti-Admin.-Pennsylvania) (until March 4)
Jonathan Dayton (Federalist-New Jersey) (starting December 7)

- Congress: 3rd (until March 4), 4th (starting March 4)

==== State governments ====
Governors and lieutenant governors

=== Governors ===
- Governor of Connecticut: Samuel Huntington (Federalist)
- Governor of Delaware: Joshua Clayton (Federalist)
- Governor of Georgia: George Mathews (Democratic-Republican)
- Governor of Kentucky: Issac Shelby (Democratic-Republican)
- Governor of Maryland: John Hoskins Stone (Federalist)
- Governor of Massachusetts: Samuel Adams (no political party)
- Governor of New Hampshire: John Taylor Gilman (Federalist)
- Governor of New Jersey: Richard Howell (Federalist)
- Governor of New York: George Clinton (Democratic-Republican) (until end of June 30), John Jay (Federalist) (starting July 1)
- Governor of North Carolina: Richard Dobbs Spaight (Federalist) (until November 19), Samuel Ashe (Anti-Federalist) (starting November 19)
- Governor of Pennsylvania: Thomas Mifflin (Democratic-Republican)
- Governor of Rhode Island: Arthur Fenner (Country)
- Governor of South Carolina: Arnoldus Vanderhorst (Federalist)
- Governor of Vermont: Thomas Chittenden (no political party)
- Governor of Virginia: Robert Brooke (Democratic-Republican)

=== Lieutenant governors ===
- Lieutenant Governor of Connecticut: Oliver Wolcott (Federalist)
- Lieutenant Governor of Massachusetts: Moses Gill (political party unknown)
- Lieutenant Governor of New York: Pierre Van Cortlandt (political party unknown) (until end of June 30), Stephen Van Rensselaer (political party unknown) (starting July 1)
- Lieutenant Governor of Rhode Island: Samuel J. Potter (Democratic-Republican)
- Lieutenant Governor of South Carolina: Lewis Morris (Federalist)
- Lieutenant Governor of Vermont: Jonathan Hunt (political party unknown) (until month and day unknown), Paul Brigham (Democratic-Republican) (starting month and day unknown)

== Events ==
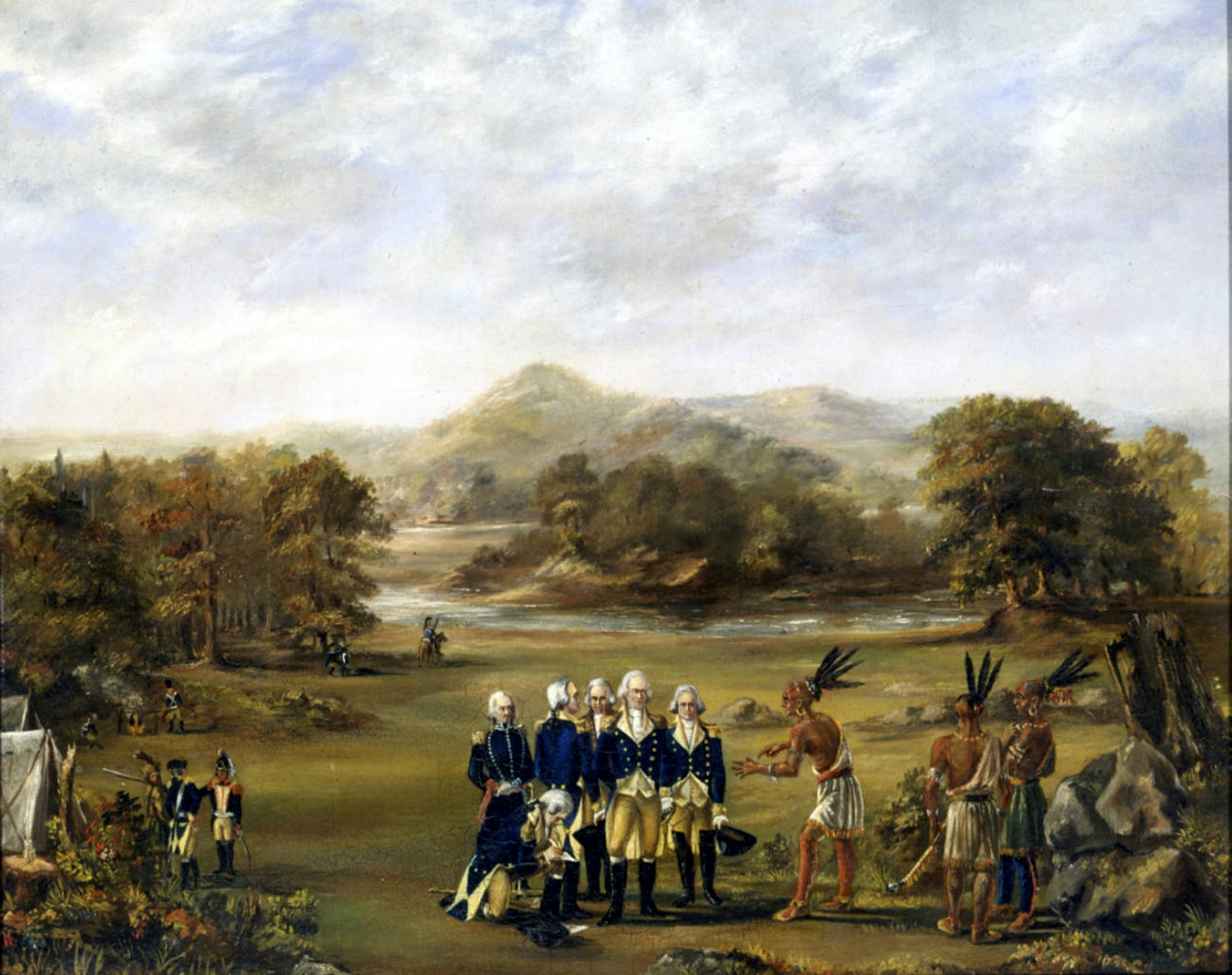
August 2: The Treaty of Greenville ends the Northwest Indian War

- January 14 – The University of North Carolina (renamed The University of North Carolina at Chapel Hill in 1963) opens to students, becoming the first state university in the United States.
- January 29 – The Naturalization Act of 1795 replaces and repeals the Naturalization Act of 1790.
- February 7 – The 11th Amendment to the United States Constitution is passed.
- May 1 – Battle of Nu'uanu: Kamehameha I of the island of Hawaii defeats the Oahuans, solidifying his control of the major islands of the archipelago and officially founding the Kingdom of Hawaii.
- June 8 – George Washington submits the Jay Treaty to the United States Senate for ratification.
- August 2 – The Treaty of Greenville is signed between the Western Confederacy and the United States, ending the Northwest Indian War.
- September 5 – The U.S. signs a treaty with the Dey of Algiers, ruled by Baba Hassan, pledging the payment of $23,000 a year tribute to prevent piracy against American ships.
- October 27 – The United States and Spain sign the Treaty of Madrid, which establishes the boundaries between Spanish colonies and the United States.

=== Ongoing ===
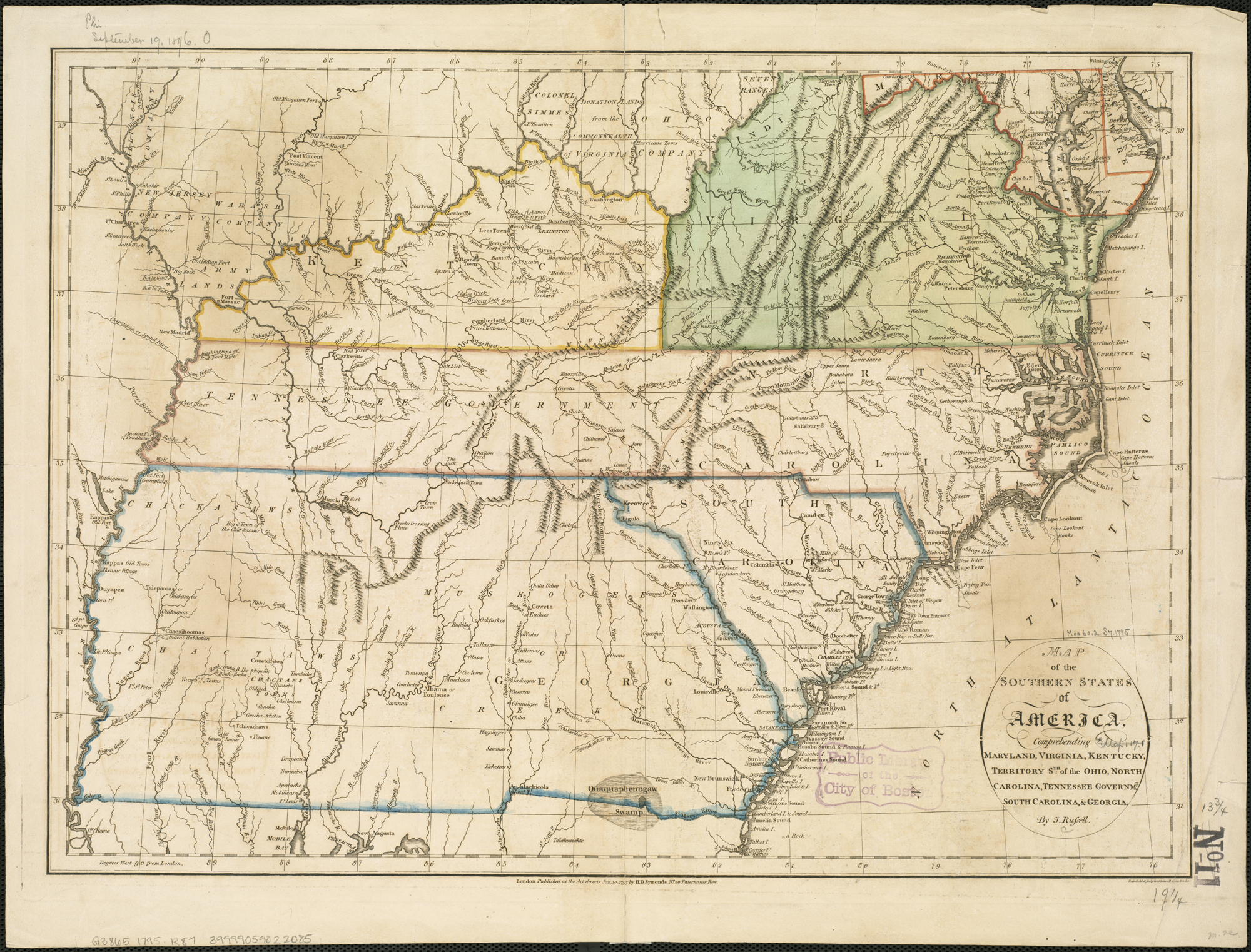
1795 Russell map "of the southern states of America, comprehending Maryland, Virginia, Kentucky, Territory sth of the Ohio, North Carolina, Tennessee Governmt., South Carolina, & Georgia"

- Northwest Indian War (1785–1795)
- Slavery (1625–1865)

== Births ==
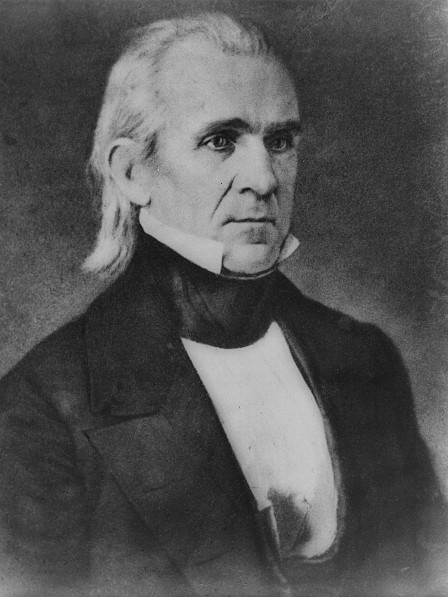
James K. Polk

- February 18 – George Peabody, businessman and philanthropist (died 1869)
- April 17 – George Edmund Badger, U.S. Senator from North Carolina from 1846 to 1855 (died 1866)
- May 19 – Johns Hopkins, businessman and philanthropist (died 1873)
- June 2 – William S. Fulton, U.S. Senator from Arkansas from 1836 to 1844 (died 1844)
- July 5 – Benjamin Morrell, sealing captain and explorer (died c. 1839 probably in Mozambique)
- August 31 – William Lee D. Ewing, U.S. Senator from Illinois in 1834 (died 1846)
- September 22 – Jesse Speight, U.S. Senator from Mississippi from 1845 to 1847 (died 1847)
- October 13 – James McDowell, politician (died 1851)
- October 16 – William Buell Sprague, clergyman, author (died 1876)
- November 2 – James K. Polk, 11th president of the U.S. from 1845 to 1849 (died 1849)
- November 12 – Thaddeus William Harris, naturalist (died 1856)
- December 1 – James Whitcomb, U.S. Senator from Indiana from 1849 to 1852 (died 1852)
- December 10 – Matthias W. Baldwin, locomotive manufacturer (died 1866)
- date unknown – Chief Oshkosh, Menominee chief (died 1858)

== Deaths ==
- January 22 – Richard Clinton, officer in the Continental Army (born 1741)
- January 23 – John Sullivan, general in the Revolutionary War, delegate in the Continental Congress (born 1740)
- January 25 – Morgan Edwards, clergyman (born 1722 in Wales)
- February 14 – Samuel Cook Silliman, member of the Connecticut House of Representatives from Norwalk (born 1741)
- February 27 – Richard Clarke, Massachusetts merchant (born 1711)
- March 4 – John Collins, 3rd Governor of Rhode Island (born 1717)
- March 9 – John Armstrong, Sr., civil engineer, major general in the Revolutionary War (born 1717)
- March 18 – Jonathan Buck, founder of Bucksport, Maine (born 1719)
- May 2 – Increase Moseley, politician (born 1712)
- May 12 – Ezra Stiles, academic, educator and author (born 1727)
- May 18 – Robert Rogers, British Army officer and colonial frontiersman (born 1731)
- May 19 – Josiah Bartlett, signatory of the Declaration of Independence (born 1729)
- July 28 – Zebulon Butler, soldier and politician (born 1731)
- August 4 – Timothy Ruggles, exiled politician (born 1711)
- August 5 – William Fleming, physician and 3rd Governor of Virginia in 1781 (born 1729 in Scotland)
- August 23 – William Bradford, 2nd U.S. Attorney General from 1794 (born 1755)
- October 10 – Samuel Fraunces, restaurateur (born 1722)
- October 13 – William Prescott, colonel in the Revolutionary War (born 1726)

== See also ==
- Timeline of United States history (1790–1819)
