= 1801 in the United States =

- Decades: 1780s; 1790s; 1800s; 1810s; 1820s
- See also: History of the United States (1789–1849); Timeline of United States history (1790–1819); List of years in the United States

Events from the year 1801 in the United States.

== Incumbents ==
=== Federal government ===
- President:

John Adams (F-Massachusetts) (until March 4)
Thomas Jefferson (DR-Virginia) (starting March 4)

- Vice President:

Thomas Jefferson (DR-Virginia) (until March 4)
Aaron Burr (DR-New York) (starting March 4)

- Chief Justice: John Marshall (Virginia)
- Speaker of the House of Representatives:

Theodore Sedgwick (F-Massachusetts) (until March 4)
Nathaniel Macon (DR-North Carolina) (starting December 7)

- Congress: 6th (until March 4), 7th (starting March 4)

==== State governments ====
Governors and lieutenant governors

=== Governors ===
- Governor of Connecticut: Jonathan Trumbull, Jr. (Federalist)
- Governor of Delaware: Richard Bassett (Federalist) (until March 3), James Sykes (Federalist) (starting March 3)
- Governor of Georgia:
  - until March 3: James Jackson (Democratic-Republican)
  - March 3 – November 7: David Emanuel (Democratic-Republican)
  - starting November 7: Josiah Tattnall (Democratic-Republican)
- Governor of Kentucky: James Garrard (Democratic-Republican)
- Governor of Maryland: Benjamin Ogle (Federalist) (until November 10), John Francis Mercer (Democratic-Republican) (starting November 10)
- Governor of Massachusetts: Caleb Strong (Federalist)
- Governor of New Hampshire: John Taylor Gilman (Federalist)
- Governor of New Jersey: Richard Howell (Federalist) (until October 31), Joseph Bloomfield (Democratic-Republican) (starting October 31)
- Governor of New York: John Jay (Federalist) (until June 30), George Clinton (Democratic-Republican) (starting July 1)
- Governor of North Carolina: Benjamin Williams (Federalist)
- Governor of Pennsylvania: Thomas McKean (Democratic-Republican)
- Governor of Rhode Island: Arthur Fenner (Country)
- Governor of South Carolina: John Drayton (Democratic-Republican)
- Governor of Tennessee: John Sevier (Democratic-Republican) (until September 23), Archibald Roane (Democratic-Republican) (starting September 23)
- Governor of Vermont: Isaac Tichenor (Federalist)
- Governor of Virginia: James Monroe (Democratic-Republican)

=== Lieutenant governors ===
- Lieutenant Governor of Connecticut: John Treadwell (Federalist)
- Lieutenant Governor of Kentucky: Alexander Scott Bullitt (political party unknown)
- Lieutenant Governor of Massachusetts: vacant (until month and day unknown), Samuel Phillips, Jr. (political party unknown) (starting month and day unknown)
- Lieutenant Governor of New York: Stephen Van Rensselaer (political party unknown) (until end of June 30), Jeremiah Van Rensselaer (political party unknown) (starting July 1)
- Lieutenant Governor of Rhode Island: Samuel J. Potter (Democratic-Republican)
- Lieutenant Governor of South Carolina: Richard Winn (Democratic-Republican)
- Lieutenant Governor of Vermont: Paul Brigham (Democratic-Republican)

== Events ==
- January 10 – William Henry Harrison becomes the first Governor of the Indiana Territory.
- January 31 – John Marshall is appointed Chief Justice of the United States.
- February – Contingent election of 1801: An electoral tie between Thomas Jefferson and Aaron Burr is resolved, when Jefferson is elected President of the United States and Burr Vice President by the United States House of Representatives.
- February 27 – Washington, D.C. is placed under the jurisdiction of the Congress of the United States.
- March 4 – Thomas Jefferson is sworn in as the third president of the United States, and Aaron Burr is sworn in as the third vice president.
- May 10 – The First Barbary War begins as the pasha of Tripoli declares war on the United States by having the flagpole on the consulate chopped down.
- July – Eli Whitney demonstrates before Congress the advantages of the system of interchangeable parts in the manufacture of firearms.
- August 1 – Action of 1 August 1801 (First Barbary War): United States Navy schooner USS Enterprise (1799) captures the 14-gun Tripolitan corsair polacca Tripoli off the north African coast in a single-ship action.
- November 16 – The first edition of New York Evening Post is printed.
- Jefferson, the first American yacht, is built in Salem, Massachusetts, for George Crowninshield Jr.

=== Ongoing ===
- First Barbary War (1801–1805)
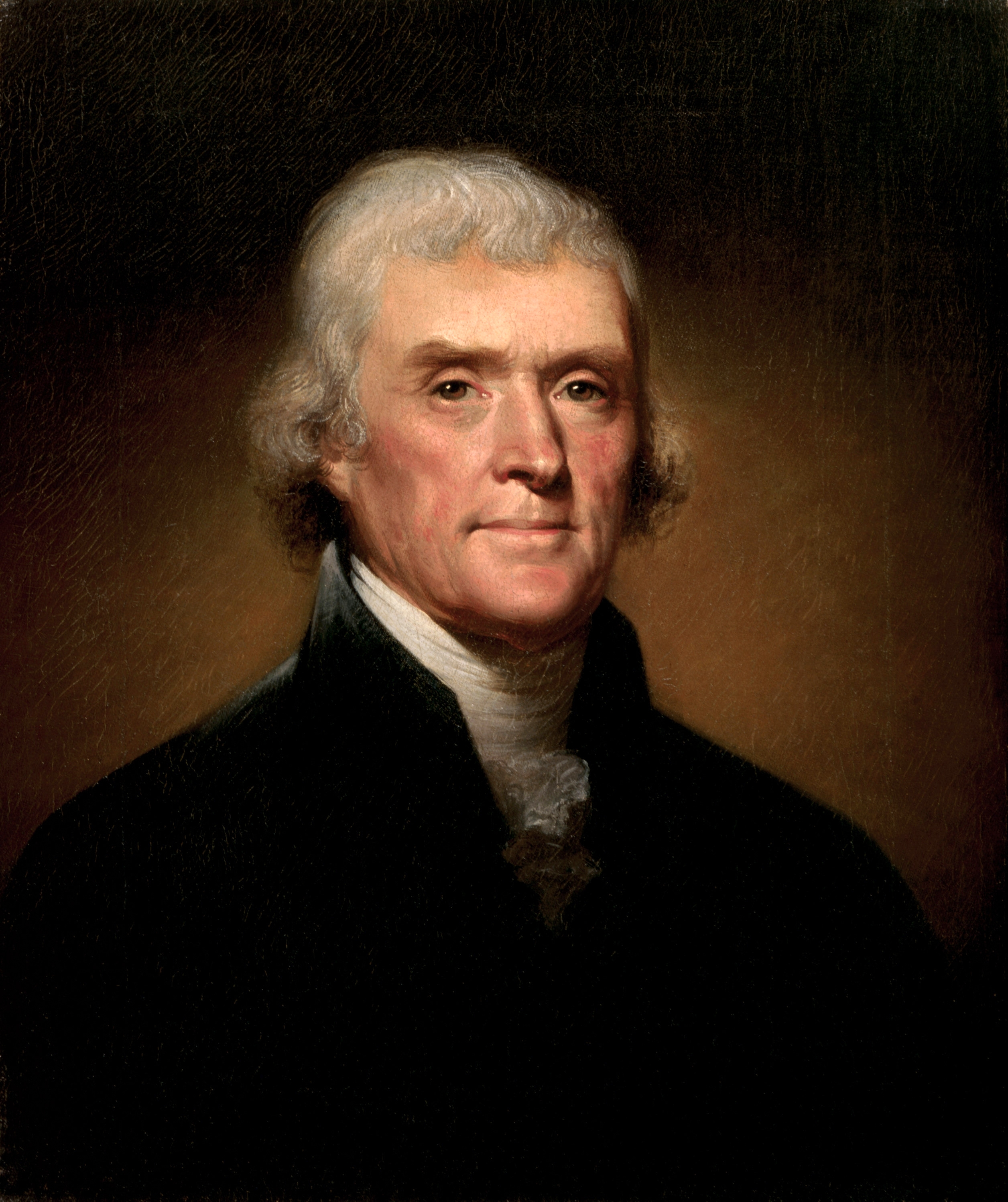
March 4: Thomas Jefferson becomes the third U.S. president

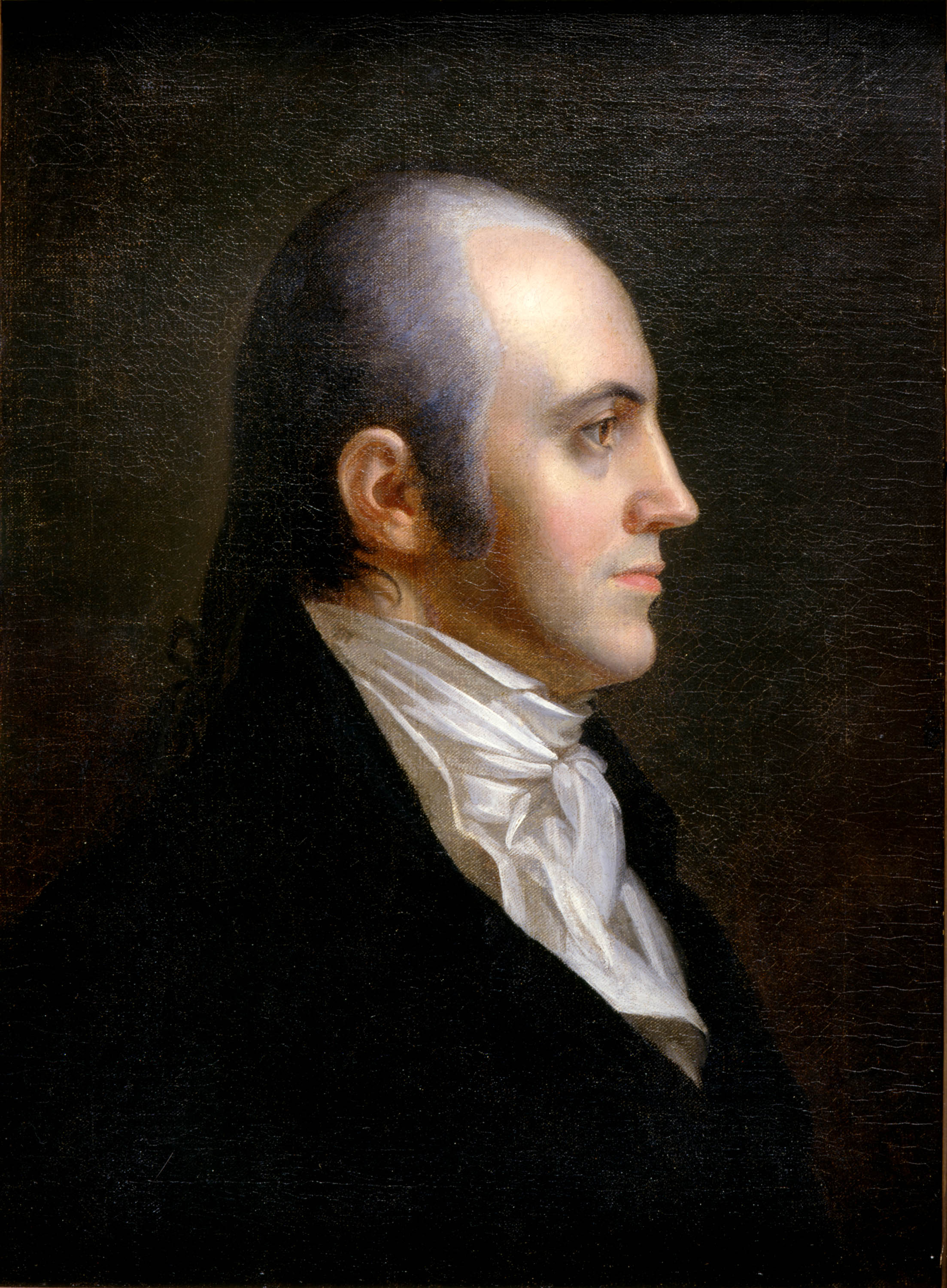
Aaron Burr becomes the third U.S. vice president

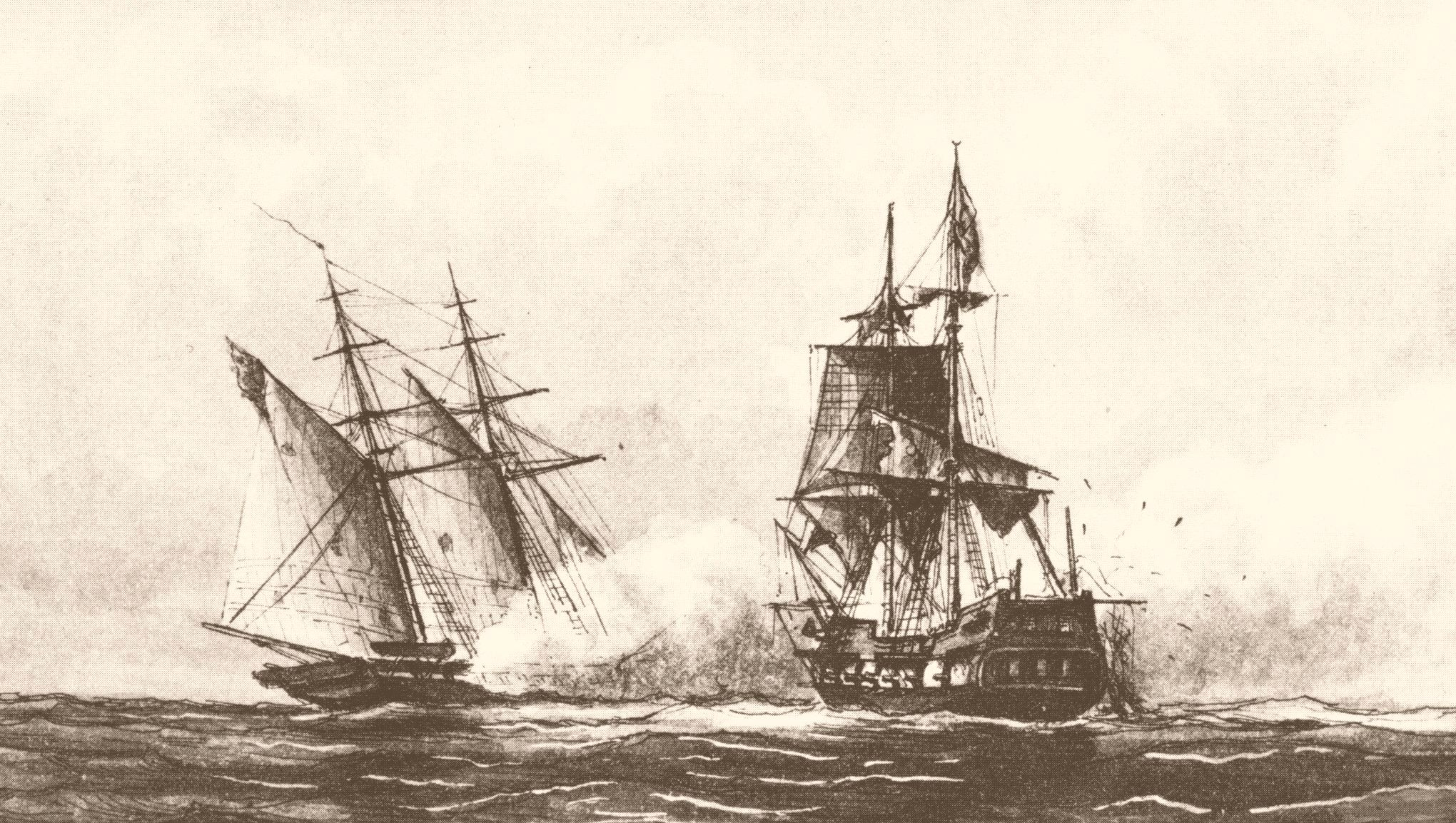
August 1: Enterprise defeats the corsair Tripoli

== Births ==
- January 20 – Thomas Hickman Williams, United States Senator from Mississippi from 1838 to 1839 (died 1851)
- March 15 – George Perkins Marsh, diplomat, philologist and pioneer environmentalist (died 1882)
- March 27 – Alexander Barrow, United States Senator from Louisiana from 1841 to 1846 (died 1846)
- April 26 – Ambrose Dudley Mann, first United States Assistant Secretary of State (died 1889)
- May 6 – George S. Greene, Union Army general (died 1899)
- May 16 – William H. Seward, United States Secretary of State from 1861 to 1869 (died 1872)
- June 1 – Brigham Young, leader in the Latter Day Saint movement (died 1877)
- July 5 – David Farragut, flag officer of the United States Navy during the American Civil War (died 1870)
- June 14 – Heber C. Kimball, religious leader (died 1868)
- June 15 – Benjamin Wright Raymond, 3rd Mayor of Chicago (died 1883)
- August 10 – Robert Woodward Barnwell, United States Senator from South Carolina from 1862 to 1865 (died 1882)
- August 31 – Pierre Soule, United States Senator from Louisiana in 1847 and from 1849 to 1853 (died 1870)
- September 10 –
  - Garrett Davis, United States Senator from Kentucky from 1861 to 1872 (died 1872)
  - Marie Laveau, Voodoo Queen of New Orleans (died 1881)
- November 4 – Ambrose Hundley Sevier, United States Senator from Arkansas from 1836 to 1848 (died 1848)
- November 9 – Gail Borden, surveyor, newspaper publisher and inventor of condensed milk (died 1874)
- November 10 – Samuel Gridley Howe, physician and abolitionist (died 1876)
- December 28 – James Barnes, Union Army general (died 1869)
- Date unknown – Solomon W. Downs, United States Senator from Louisiana from 1847 to 1853 (died 1854)

== Deaths ==
- January 9 – Margaretta Faugères, playwright, poet and political activist (born 1771)
- February 6 – Annis Boudinot Stockton, poet and sponsor of literary salons (born 1736)
- February 23 – Elizabeth Graeme Fergusson, poet and sponsor of literary salons (born 1737)
- March 14 – Margarita "Peggy" Schuyler, youngest child of Philip Schuyler (born 1758)
- June 4 – Frederick Muhlenberg, first Speaker of the House of Representatives (born 1750)
- June 14 – Benedict Arnold, Revolutionary hero and traitor (born 1741)
- September 10 – Jason Fairbanks, murderer (born 1780)
- November – Amos Fortune, formerly enslaved tanner and library co-founder
- November 4 – William Shippen, physician and Continental Congressman (born 1712)
- November 23 – Philip Hamilton, first son of Alexander Hamilton and Elizabeth Schuyler Hamilton, (fatally shot by George Eacker in a duel at age 19) (born 1782)

== See also ==
- Timeline of United States history (1790–1819)
- Timeline of the John Adams presidency § 1801
- Timeline of the Thomas Jefferson presidency § 1801
