= 1796 in the United States =

- Decades: 1770s; 1780s; 1790s; 1800s; 1810s
- See also: History of the United States (1789–1849); Timeline of United States history (1790–1819); List of years in the United States

Abraham Bradley's 1796 map of the postal routes of the United States

Events from the year 1796 in the United States.

== Incumbents ==
=== Federal government ===
- President: George Washington (Independent-Virginia)
- Vice President: John Adams (F-Massachusetts)
- Chief Justice: Oliver Ellsworth (Connecticut)
- Speaker of the House of Representatives: Jonathan Dayton (F-New Jersey)
- Congress: 4th

==== State governments ====
Governors and lieutenant governors

=== Governors ===
- Governor of Connecticut: Samuel Huntington (Federalist) (until January 5), Oliver Wolcott (Federalist) (starting January 5)
- Governor of Delaware: Joshua Clayton (Federalist) (until January 19), Gunning Bedford Sr. (Federalist) (starting January 19)
- Governor of Georgia: George Mathews (Democratic-Republican) (until January 15), Jared Irwin (Democratic-Republican) (starting January 15)
- Governor of Kentucky: Issac Shelby (Democratic-Republican) (until June 7), James Garrard (Democratic-Republican) (starting June 7)
- Governor of Maryland: John Hoskins Stone (Federalist)
- Governor of Massachusetts: Samuel Adams (no political party)
- Governor of New Hampshire: John Taylor Gilman (Federalist)
- Governor of New Jersey: Richard Howell (Federalist)
- Governor of New York: John Jay (Federalist)
- Governor of North Carolina: Samuel Ashe (Anti-Federalist)
- Governor of Pennsylvania: Thomas Mifflin (no political party)
- Governor of Rhode Island: Arthur Fenner (Country)
- Governor of South Carolina: Arnoldus Vanderhorst (Federalist) (until December 8), Charles Pinckney (Democratic-Republican) (starting December 8)
- Governor of Tennessee: John Sevier (Democratic-Republican) (starting June 1)
- Governor of Vermont: Thomas Chittenden (no political party)
- Governor of Virginia: Robert Brooke (Democratic-Republican) (until December 1), James Wood (Democratic-Republican) (starting December 1)

=== Lieutenant governors ===
- Lieutenant Governor of Connecticut: Oliver Wolcott (Federalist) (until January 5), Jonathan Trumbull Jr. (Federalist) (starting January 5)
- Lieutenant Governor of Massachusetts: Moses Gill (political party unknown)
- Lieutenant Governor of New York: Stephen Van Rensselaer (political party unknown)
- Lieutenant Governor of Rhode Island: Samuel J. Potter (Democratic-Republican)
- Lieutenant Governor of South Carolina: Lewis Morris (Federalist) (until December 8), Robert Anderson (Democratic-Republican) (starting December 8)
- Lieutenant Governor of Vermont: Jonathan Hunt (political party unknown) (until October 13), Paul Brigham (Democratic-Republican) (starting October 13)

== Events ==
- February 29 – Ratifications of the Jay Treaty between the United States and Great Britain are officially exchanged, bringing it into effect. Britain vacates the forts it has been retaining in the Great Lakes region.
- March 30 – John Sevier is inaugurated as first governor of Tennessee.
- June 1 – Tennessee is admitted as the 16th U.S. state (see History of Tennessee).
- July 11 – The United States takes possession of Detroit from Great Britain under the terms of the Jay Treaty.
- July 14 – The de Portolá Expedition sets out from San Diego (modern-day San Diego, California) to find the Port of Monterey (modern-day Monterey, California).
- July 22 – Surveyors of the Connecticut Land Company name an area in Ohio "Cleveland" after Gen. Moses Cleaveland, the superintendent of the surveying party.
- August 2 – Marc Isambard Brunel is granted citizenship of the United States; in the autumn he is appointed chief engineer of New York City.
- August 31 – John McKinly, the first president of Delaware, dies in Wilmington, Delaware.
- September 17 – U.S. President George Washington issues his Farewell Address, which warns against partisan politics and foreign entanglements.
- November 2 – John Adams defeats Thomas Jefferson in the 1796 United States presidential election.
- November 4 – The Treaty of Tripoli (between the United States and Tripoli) is signed at Tripoli (see also 1797).
- November 10 – The de Portolá Expedition returns from its terminus point (modern-day Menlo Park, California) to San Diego after failing to find Vizcaíno's Port of Monterey).
- December 7 – The U.S. Electoral College meets to elect John Adams president.

=== Ongoing ===
- Panic of 1796–1797 (1796–1797)

== Births ==
- February 18 – John Bell, United States Senator from Tennessee from 1847 till 1859. (died 1869)
- April 10 – Thomas Fitzgerald, United States Senator from Michigan from 1848 till 1849. (died 1855)
- July 24 – John M. Clayton, United States Senator from Delaware from 1829 till 1836, from 1845 till 1849 and from 1853 till 1856. (died 1856)
- September 26 – Richard H. Bayard, United States Senator from Delaware from 1841 till 1845. (died 1868)

== Deaths ==
- January 5 – Samuel Huntington, 7th president of the Continental Congress, signatory of the Declaration of Independence and Articles of Confederation (born 1731)
- February 25 – Samuel Seabury, presiding bishop of the Episcopal Church (born 1729)
- June 11 – Nathaniel Gorham, President of the Continental Congress, signatory of the United States Constitution (born 1738)
- June 21 – Richard Gridley, Revolutionary soldier (born 1710)
- June 26 – David Rittenhouse, astronomer, inventor, mathematician, surveyor, scientific instrument craftsman and public official (born 1732)
- June 30 – Abraham Yates, Continental Congressman (born 1724)
- August 31 – John McKinly, physician and 1st president of Delaware (born 1721)
- n.d. – Prince Whipple, formerly enslaved manservant of New Hampshire militia general William Whipple (born at Anomabu on the Gold Coast of Africa c. 1750)

== See also ==
- Timeline of United States history (1790–1819)
