= Tax revolt =

Tax revolt can refer to:

- An illegal refusal to pay taxes, also known as tax resistance
- A voter movement to reduce taxes by legal means, such as the property tax revolts in the United States in the late 20th century
