= Richard Ely Selden =

American politician

Richard Ely Selden (June 13, 1797 – March 3, 1868) was an American politician and writer.

He was born June 13, 1797. He graduated from Yale College in 1818. After graduation, he commenced the study of law, but being an only son and his father's health being poor, he decided to remain on the homestead in agricultural pursuits. He was a member of the Connecticut State Senate in 1844. He took a deep interest in the theological controversy which arose in Connecticut about thirty years ago, and published a small work on that and kindred topics. Selden married Eliza, daughter of Judge William Lynde, of Old Saybrook, Conn., by whom he had five children; four of them, including Samuel Hart Selden (1826–1891), survived him. His wife died on January 23, 1866. Selden died of typhoid fever at Hadlyme, Connecticut, on March 3, 1868, aged 70 years.
