= 1851 in the United States =

- Decades: 1830s; 1840s; 1850s; 1860s; 1870s
- See also: History of the United States (1849–1865); Timeline of United States history (1820–1859); List of years in the United States

Events from the year 1851 in the United States.

== Incumbents ==
=== Federal government ===
- President: Millard Fillmore (W-New York)
- Vice President: vacant
- Chief Justice: Roger B. Taney (Maryland)
- Speaker of the House of Representatives:

Howell Cobb (D-Georgia) (until March 4)
Linn Boyd (D-Kentucky) (starting December 1)

- Congress: 31st (until March 4), 32nd (starting March 4)

==== State governments ====
Governors and lieutenant governors

=== Governors ===
- Governor of Alabama: Henry W. Collier (Democratic)
- Governor of Arkansas: John Selden Roane (Democratic)
- Governor of California: Peter Hardeman Burnett (Democratic) (until January 9), John McDougall (Democratic) (starting January 9)
- Governor of Connecticut: Thomas H. Seymour (Democratic)
- Governor of Delaware: William Tharp (Democratic) (until January 21), William H. H. Ross (Democratic) (starting January 21)
- Governor of Florida: Thomas Brown (Whig)
- Governor of Georgia: George W. Towns (Democratic) (until November 5), Howell Cobb (Democratic) (starting November 5)
- Governor of Illinois: Augustus C. French (Democratic)
- Governor of Indiana: Joseph A. Wright (Democratic)
- Governor of Iowa: Stephen P. Hempstead (Democratic)
- Governor of Kentucky: John L. Helm (Democratic) (until September 2), Lazarus W. Powell (Democratic) (starting September 2)
- Governor of Louisiana: Joseph Marshall Walker (Democratic)
- Governor of Maine: John Hubbard (Democratic)
- Governor of Maryland: Philip F. Thomas (Democratic) (until January 6), Enoch Louis Lowe (Democratic) (starting January 6)
- Governor of Massachusetts: George N. Briggs (Democratic) (until January 11), George S. Boutwell (Democratic) (starting January 11)
- Governor of Michigan: John S. Barry (Democratic)
- Governor of Mississippi:
  - until February 3: John A. Quitman (Democratic)
  - February 3-November 4: John I. Guion (Democratic)
  - starting November 24: James Whitfield (Democratic)
- Governor of Missouri: Austin Augustus King (Democratic)
- Governor of New Hampshire: Samuel Dinsmoor, Jr. (Democratic)
- Governor of New Jersey: Daniel Haines (Democratic) (until January 21), George F. Fort (Democratic) (starting January 21)
- Governor of New York: Washington Hunt (Whig) (starting January 1)
- Governor of North Carolina: Charles Manly (Whig) (until January 1), David Settle Reid (Democratic) (starting January 1)
- Governor of Ohio: Reuben Wood (Democratic)
- Governor of Pennsylvania: William F. Johnston (Whig)
- Governor of Rhode Island: Henry B. Anthony (Whig) (until May 6), Philip Allen (Democratic) (starting May 6)
- Governor of South Carolina: John Hugh Means (Democratic)
- Governor of Tennessee: William Trousdale (Democratic) (until October 16), William B. Campbell (Whig) (starting October 16)
- Governor of Texas: Peter Hansborough Bell (Democratic)
- Governor of Vermont: Charles K. Williams (Whig)
- Governor of Virginia: John B. Floyd (Democratic)
- Governor of Wisconsin: Nelson Dewey (Democratic)

=== Lieutenant governors ===
- Lieutenant Governor of California: John McDougall (Democratic) (until January 9), David C. Broderick (Democratic) (starting January 9)
- Lieutenant Governor of Connecticut: Charles H. Pond (Democratic) (until month and day unknown), Green Kendrick (Whig) (starting month and day unknown)
- Lieutenant Governor of Illinois: William McMurtry (Democratic)
- Lieutenant Governor of Indiana: James H. Lane (Democratic)
- Lieutenant Governor of Kentucky: vacant (until September 2), John Burton Thompson (political party unknown) (starting September 2)
- Lieutenant Governor of Louisiana: Jean Baptiste Plauche (Whig)
- Lieutenant Governor of Massachusetts: John Reed, Jr. (political party unknown) (until January 11), Henry W. Cushman (political party unknown) (starting January 11)
- Lieutenant Governor of Michigan: William M. Fenton (Democratic) (until month and day unknown), vacant (starting month and day unknown)
- Lieutenant Governor of Missouri: Thomas Lawson Price (Democratic)
- Lieutenant Governor of New York: Sanford E. Church (Democratic) (starting January 1)
- Lieutenant Governor of Rhode Island: Thomas Whipple (political party unknown) (until May 6), William Beach Lawrence (political party unknown) (starting May 6)
- Lieutenant Governor of South Carolina: Joshua John Ward (Democratic)
- Lieutenant Governor of Texas: John Alexander Greer (Democratic) (until August 4), James Wilson Henderson (Democratic) (starting August 4)
- Lieutenant Governor of Vermont: Julius Converse (Whig)
- Lieutenant Governor of Wisconsin: Samuel W. Beall (Democratic)

== Events ==
=== January–March ===
- January 1 – HBCU, University of the District of Columbia is established, the 2nd HBCU in America.
- January 15 – Christian Female College, later Columbia College, receives its charter from the Missouri General Assembly.
- January 23 – The flip of a coin determines whether a new city in the Oregon Territory is named after Boston, Massachusetts, or Portland, Maine, with Portland winning.
- January 28 – The Illinois General Assembly grants a charter to create Northwestern University.

=== April–June ===
- April 9 – San Luis, the oldest permanent settlement in the state of Colorado, is founded by settlers from Taos, New Mexico.
- April 28 – Santa Clara College is chartered in Santa Clara, California.
- May–August – The Great Flood of 1851 causes extensive damage in the Midwest; the town of Des Moines is virtually destroyed.
- May 6 – John Gorrie of Apalachicola, Florida is granted Patent No. 8080 for a machine to make ice.
- May 15 – Alpha Delta Pi sorority, the first secret society for women, is founded at Wesleyan College in Macon, Georgia.
- May 29 – Sojourner Truth delivers the first version of her "Ain't I a Woman?" speech, at the Women's Rights Convention in Akron, Ohio.

=== July–September ===
- July 10 – The University of the Pacific is chartered as California Wesleyan College in Santa Clara, California.
- August 1 – Virginia closes its Reform Constitutional Convention deciding that all white men have the right to vote.
- August 3 – The filibustering Lopez Expedition departs New Orleans for Cuba.
- August 22 – The yacht America of the New York Yacht Club wins the first America's Cup race, off the coast of England.
- September 15 – Saint Joseph's University is founded in Philadelphia, Pennsylvania.
- September 18 – The New York Times is founded.

=== October–December ===
- October 15 – The City of Winona, Minnesota is founded.
- November 13 – The Denny Party lands at Alki Point, the first settlers of what later becomes Seattle, Washington.
- November 14 – Herman Melville's novel Moby-Dick; or The Whale is published in the U.S. by Harper & Brothers, New York, after being first published on October 18 in London by Richard Bentley, in 3 volumes as The Whale.
- December 29 – The first YMCA opens in Boston, Massachusetts.

=== Undated ===
- Western Union is founded as the New York and Mississippi Valley Printing Telegraph Company.
- House sparrows first released in the U.S., in Brooklyn.
- Stephen Foster's minstrel song "Old Folks at Home" is first published.
- Hope College is established in Holland, Michigan, as the Pioneer School by Dutch immigrants.

=== Ongoing ===
- California Gold Rush (1848–1855)

== Births ==
- January 17 – A. B. Frost, illustrator (died 1928)
- January 19 – David Starr Jordan, ichthyologist, educator, eugenicist and peace activist (died 1924)
- January 24 – Marcus A. Smith, U.S. Senator from Arizona from 1912 to 1921 (died 1924)
- February 2 – Ella Giles Ruddy, author and essayist (died 1917)
- February 9 – Nora Trueblood Gause, humanitarian (died 1955)
- February 13 – Joseph B. Murdock, U.S. Navy admiral and New Hampshire politician (died 1931)
- March 14 – John Sebastian Little, politician, congressman (died 1916)
- March 19 – William Henry Stark, business leader (died 1936)
- March 26 – John Eisenmann, Cleveland architect (died 1924)
- April 13
  - Robert Abbe, surgeon (died 1928)
  - Helen M. Winslow, editor, author and publisher (died 1938)
- May 14 – Anna Laurens Dawes, author and suffragist (died 1938)
- May 15 – Lillian Resler Keister Harford, church organizer and editor (died 1935)
- May 21 – Moses E. Clapp, U.S. Senator from Minnesota from 1901 to 1917 (died 1929)
- May 29 – Fred Dubois, U.S. Senator from Idaho from 1891 to 1897 and from 1901 to 1907 (died 1930)
- June 24 – Stuyvesant Fish, entrepreneur (died 1923)
- August 12 – Frank O. Briggs, U.S. Senator from New Jersey from 1907 to 1913 (died 1913)
- August 14 – Doc Holliday, born John H. Holliday, gunfighter, gambler and dentist (died 1887)
- September 7 – David King Udall, politician (died 1938)
- September 13 – Walter Reed, army physician, bacteriologist (died 1902)
- September 21 – Fanny Searls (died 1939), doctor and botanist.
- October 5 – Thomas Pollock Anshutz, painter and educator (died 1912)
- October 13 – Charles Sprague Pearce, painter (died 1914)
- October 20 – George Gandy, entrepreneur (died 1946)
- November 16
  - Minnie Hauk, operatic soprano (died 1929)
  - William Elbridge Sewell, naval officer and Governor of Guam (died 1904)
- December 9 – Thomas H. Paynter, U.S. Senator from Kentucky from 1907 to 1913 (died 1921)
- December 10 – Melvil Dewey, librarian (died 1931)
- December 30 – Asa Griggs Candler, businessman and politician (died 1929)
- Albery Allson Whitman, African American poet (died 1901)

== Deaths ==
- January 17 – Thomas Lincoln, farmer and father of President of the United States Abraham Lincoln (born 1778)
- January 27 – John James Audubon, naturalist and illustrator (born 1785 in Saint-Domingue)
- January 31 – David Spangler Kaufman, Congressman from Texas (born 1813)
- February 3 – Benjamin Williams Crowninshield, Congressman from Massachusetts, secretary of U.S. Navy (born 1772)
- March 11 – George McDuffie, 55th Governor of South Carolina from 1842 to 1846 (born 1790)
- May 3 – Thomas Hickman Williams, U.S. Senator from Mississippi from 1838 to 1839 (born 1801)
- May 22 – Mordecai Manuel Noah, Jewish playwright, diplomat, journalist and utopian (born 1785)
- June 21 – Martin Chester Deming, American businessman and politician (b. 1789)
- July 6 – Thomas Davenport, electrical engineer (born 1802)
- August 24 – James McDowell, politician (born 1795)
- September 10 – Thomas Hopkins Gallaudet, minister, educator, co-founder of the first permanent school for the deaf in North America (born 1787)
- September 11 – Sylvester Graham, nutritionist and inventor (born 1794)
- September 14 – James Fenimore Cooper, historical novelist (born 1789)
- September 24 – Lucius Lyon, U.S. Senator from Michigan from 1843 to 1845 (born 1800)
- November – Willis Buell, politician and portrait painter (born 1790)
- Jim Boy – Muscogee war chief

== See also ==
- Timeline of United States history (1820–1859)
