= Thomas Fitzgerald (American politician, born 1796) =

American politician (1796–1855)

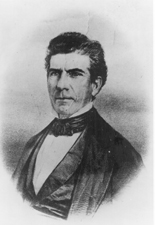

United States Senator from Michigan
- In office June 8, 1848 – March 3, 1849
- Appointed by: Epaphroditus Ransom
- Preceded by: Lewis Cass
- Succeeded by: Lewis Cass

Member of the Indiana House of Representatives
- In office 1821; 1825-1827

Member of the Michigan House of Representatives
- In office 1839

Personal details
- Born: April 10, 1796 Germantown, New York
- Died: March 25, 1855 (aged 58) Niles, Michigan
- Party: Democratic
- Profession: Politician, lawyer, judge, teacher, lighthouse keeper

Thomas Fitzgerald (April 10, 1796 – March 25, 1855) was an American politician who served as a judge and state legislator in both Indiana and Michigan, and as a United States senator from Michigan.

Fitzgerald was born in Germantown, in Herkimer County, New York. His father was an Irish immigrant, and fought with the Continental Army, was wounded and received a pension. Thomas received a common school education and fought with the U.S. Army the War of 1812. He was severely wounded and afterwards taught school for a time in Marcellus, New York. In 1819 he moved to Boonville, Indiana, where he taught school and studied law. He was admitted to the bar in 1821 and began a practice in Boonville. He was a member of the State House of Representatives in 1821 and from 1825 to 1827. He was a probate judge in Indiana in 1829.

In 1832, Fitzgerald was appointed keeper of the lighthouse at the mouth of the St. Joseph River and moved to St. Joseph, Michigan. He was clerk of Berrien County in 1834 and a regent of the University of Michigan in 1837.

He was appointed bank commissioner in 1838 to investigate what were called "wildcat" banks and served in the Michigan House of Representatives in 1839. He ran unsuccessfully for lieutenant governor in 1839 and was appointed as a Democrat to the U.S. Senate to fill the vacancy caused by the resignation of Lewis Cass, serving in the 30th Congress from June 8, 1848, until March 3, 1849.

He moved to Niles, Michigan in 1851 and served as probate judge of Berrien County from 1852 to 1855. He died in Niles and is interred in Silverbrook Cemetery.

U.S. Senate
Preceded by Lewis Cass	U.S. senator (Class 1) from Michigan; June 8, 1848 – March 3, 1849; Served alongside: Alpheus Felch	Succeeded by Lewis Cass
