= 1941 in the United States =

- Decades: 1920s; 1930s; 1940s; 1950s; 1960s
- See also: History of the United States (1918–1945); Timeline of United States history (1930–1949); List of years in the United States

Events from the year 1941 in the United States. At the end of this year, the United States enters World War II by declaring war on the Empire of Japan following the attack on Pearl Harbor.

== Incumbents ==
=== Federal government ===
- President: Franklin D. Roosevelt (D-New York)
- Vice President:

John Nance Garner (D-Texas) (until January 20)
Henry A. Wallace (D-Iowa) (starting January 20)

- Chief Justice:

Charles Evans Hughes (New York) (until June 30)
Harlan F. Stone (New York) (starting July 3)

- Speaker of the House of Representatives: Sam Rayburn (D-Texas)
- Senate Majority Leader: Alben W. Barkley (D-Kentucky)
- Congress: 76th (until January 3), 77th (starting January 3)

==== State governments ====
Governors and lieutenant governors

=== Governors ===
- Governor of Alabama: Frank M. Dixon (Democratic)
- Governor of Arizona: Robert Taylor Jones (Democratic) (until January 2), Sidney Preston Osborn (Democratic) (starting January 2)
- Governor of Arkansas: Carl Edward Bailey (Democratic) (until January 14), Homer Martin Adkins (Democratic) (starting January 14)
- Governor of California: Culbert Olson (Democratic)
- Governor of Colorado: Ralph Lawrence Carr (Republican)
- Governor of Connecticut: Raymond E. Baldwin (Republican) (until January 8), Robert A. Hurley (Democratic) (starting January 8)
- Governor of Delaware: Richard C. McMullen (Democratic) (until January 8), Walter W. Bacon (Republican) (starting January 8)
- Governor of Florida: Fred P. Cone (Democratic) (until January 7), Spessard Holland (Democratic) (starting January 7)
- Governor of Georgia: Eurith D. Rivers (Democratic) (until January 14), Eugene Talmadge (Democratic) (starting January 14)
- Governor of Idaho: C. A. Bottolfsen (Republican) (until January 6), Chase A. Clark (Democratic) (starting January 6)
- Governor of Illinois: John H. Stelle (Democratic) (until January 13), Dwight H. Green (Republican) (starting January 13)
- Governor of Indiana: M. Clifford Townsend (Democratic) (until January 13), Henry F. Schricker (Democratic) (starting January 13)
- Governor of Iowa: George A. Wilson (Republican)
- Governor of Kansas: Payne Ratner (Republican)
- Governor of Kentucky: Keen Johnson (Democratic)
- Governor of Louisiana: Sam H. Jones (Democratic)
- Governor of Maine: Lewis O. Barrows (Republican) (until January 1), Sumner Sewall (Republican) (starting January 1)
- Governor of Maryland: Herbert R. O'Conor (Democratic)
- Governor of Massachusetts: Leverett Saltonstall (Republican)
- Governor of Michigan: Luren Dickinson (Republican) (until January 1), Murray Van Wagoner (Democratic) (starting January 1)
- Governor of Minnesota: Harold Stassen (Republican)
- Governor of Mississippi: Paul B. Johnson, Sr. (Democratic)
- Governor of Missouri: Lloyd C. Stark (Democratic) (until February 26), Forrest C. Donnell (Republican) (starting February 26)
- Governor of Montana: Roy E. Ayers (Democratic) (until January 6), Sam C. Ford (Republican) (starting January 6)
- Governor of Nebraska: Robert Leroy Cochran (Democratic) (until January 9), Dwight Griswold (Republican) (starting January 9)
- Governor of Nevada: Edward P. Carville (Democratic)
- Governor of New Hampshire: Francis P. Murphy (Republican) (until January 2), Robert O. Blood (Republican) (starting January 2)
- Governor of New Jersey: A. Harry Moore (Democratic) (until January 21), Charles Edison (Democratic) (starting January 21)
- Governor of New Mexico: John E. Miles (Democratic)
- Governor of New York: Herbert H. Lehman (Democratic)
- Governor of North Carolina: Clyde R. Hoey (Democratic) (until January 9), J. Melville Broughton (Democratic) (starting January 9)
- Governor of North Dakota: John Moses (Democratic)
- Governor of Ohio: John W. Bricker (Republican)
- Governor of Oklahoma: Leon C. Phillips (Democratic)
- Governor of Oregon: Charles A. Sprague (Republican)
- Governor of Pennsylvania: Arthur James (Republican)
- Governor of Rhode Island: William Henry Vanderbilt III (Republican) (until January 7), J. Howard McGrath (Democratic) (starting January 7)
- Governor of South Carolina: Burnet R. Maybank (Democratic) (until November 7), Joseph Emile Harley (Democratic) (starting November 7)
- Governor of South Dakota: Harlan J. Bushfield (Republican)
- Governor of Tennessee: Prentice Cooper (Democratic)
- Governor of Texas: W. Lee O'Daniel (Democratic) (until August 4), Coke R. Stevenson (Democratic) (starting August 4)
- Governor of Utah: Henry H. Blood (Democratic) (until January 6), Herbert B. Maw (Democratic) (starting January 6)
- Governor of Vermont: George David Aiken (Republican) (until January 9), William H. Wills (Republican) (starting January 9)
- Governor of Virginia: James H. Price (Democratic)
- Governor of Washington: Clarence D. Martin (Democratic) (until January 15), Arthur B. Langlie (Republican) (starting January 15)
- Governor of West Virginia: Homer A. Holt (Democratic) (until January 13), Matthew M. Neely (Democratic) (starting January 13)
- Governor of Wisconsin: Julius P. Heil (Republican)
- Governor of Wyoming: Nels H. Smith (Republican)

=== Lieutenant governors ===
- Lieutenant Governor of Alabama: Albert A. Carmichael (Democratic)
- Lieutenant Governor of Arkansas: Robert L. Bailey (Democratic)
- Lieutenant Governor of California: Ellis E. Patterson (Democratic)
- Lieutenant Governor of Colorado: John Charles Vivian (Republican)
- Lieutenant Governor of Connecticut: James L. McConaughy (Republican) (until January 8), Odell Shepard (Democratic) (starting January 8)
- Lieutenant Governor of Delaware: Edward W. Cooch (Democratic) (until January 21), Isaac J. MacCollum (Democratic) (starting January 21)
- Lieutenant Governor of Idaho: Donald S. Whitehead (Republican) (until January 6), Charles C. Gossett (Democratic) (starting January 6)
- Lieutenant Governor of Illinois: vacant (until January 13), Hugh W. Cross (Republican) (starting January 13)
- Lieutenant Governor of Indiana: Henry F. Schricker (Democratic) (until January 13), Charles M. Dawson (Democratic) (starting January 13)
- Lieutenant Governor of Iowa: Bourke B. Hickenlooper (Republican)
- Lieutenant Governor of Kansas: Carl E. Friend (Republican)
- Lieutenant Governor of Kentucky: Rodes K. Myers (Democratic)
- Lieutenant Governor of Louisiana: Marc M. Mouton (Democratic)
- Lieutenant Governor of Massachusetts: Horace T. Cahill (Republican)
- Lieutenant Governor of Michigan: Matilda Dodge Wilson (Republican) (until month and day unknown), Frank Murphy (Democratic) (starting month and day unknown)
- Lieutenant Governor of Minnesota: C. Elmer Anderson (Republican)
- Lieutenant Governor of Mississippi: Dennis Murphree (Democratic)
- Lieutenant Governor of Missouri: Frank Gaines Harris (Democratic)
- Lieutenant Governor of Montana: Hugh R. Adair (Democratic) (until January 6), Ernest T. Eaton (Republican) (starting January 6)
- Lieutenant Governor of Nebraska: William E. Johnson (Republican)
- Lieutenant Governor of Nevada: Maurice J. Sullivan (Democratic)
- Lieutenant Governor of New Mexico: James Murray, Sr. (Democratic) (until January 1), Ceferino Quintana (Democratic) (starting January 1)
- Lieutenant Governor of New York: Charles Poletti (Democratic)
- Lieutenant Governor of North Carolina: Wilkins P. Horton (Democratic) (until month and day unknown), Reginald L. Harris (Democratic) (starting month and day unknown)
- Lieutenant Governor of North Dakota: Jack A. Patterson (Republican) (until month and day unknown), Oscar W. Hagen (Republican) (starting month and day unknown)
- Lieutenant Governor of Ohio: Paul M. Herbert (Republican)
- Lieutenant Governor of Oklahoma: James E. Berry (Democratic)
- Lieutenant Governor of Pennsylvania: Samuel S. Lewis (Democratic)
- Lieutenant Governor of Rhode Island: James O. McManus (Republican) (until January 7), Louis W. Cappelli (Democratic) (starting January 7)
- Lieutenant Governor of South Carolina: Joseph Emile Harley (Democratic) (until month and day unknown), vacant (starting November 4)
- Lieutenant Governor of South Dakota: Donald McMurchie (Republican) (starting month and day unknown), A. C. Miller (Republican) (starting month and day unknown)
- Lieutenant Governor of Tennessee: Blan R. Maxwell (Democratic)
- Lieutenant Governor of Texas: Coke Robert Stevenson (Democratic) (until August 4), vacant (starting August 4)
- Lieutenant Governor of Vermont: William H. Wills (Republican) (until January 9), Mortimer R. Proctor (Republican) (starting January 9)
- Lieutenant Governor of Virginia: vacant
- Lieutenant Governor of Washington: Victor A. Meyers (Democratic)
- Lieutenant Governor of Wisconsin: Walter S. Goodland (Republican)

== Events ==
=== January ===
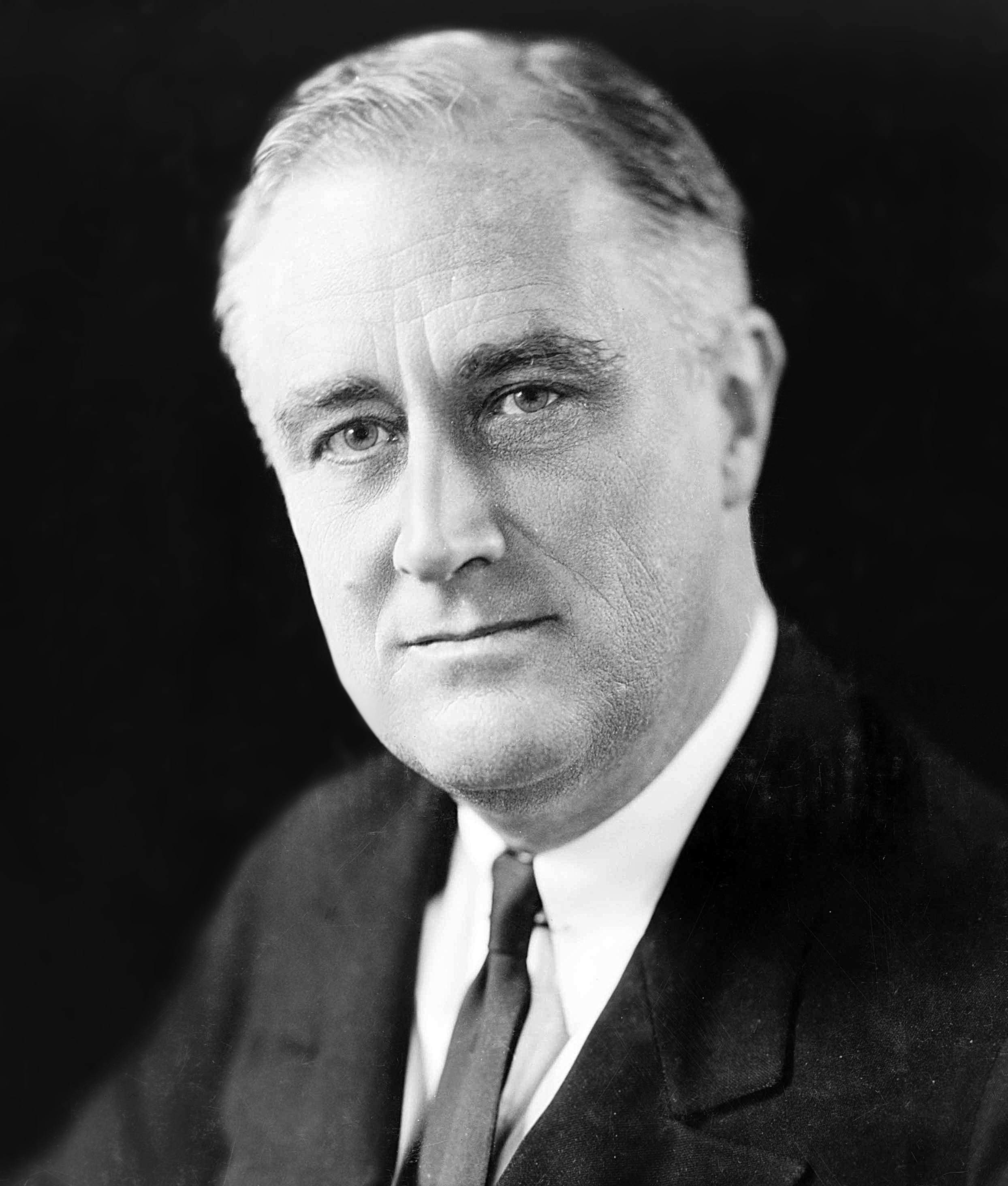
January 20: Franklin D. Roosevelt, the 32nd president of the United States, begins his third term

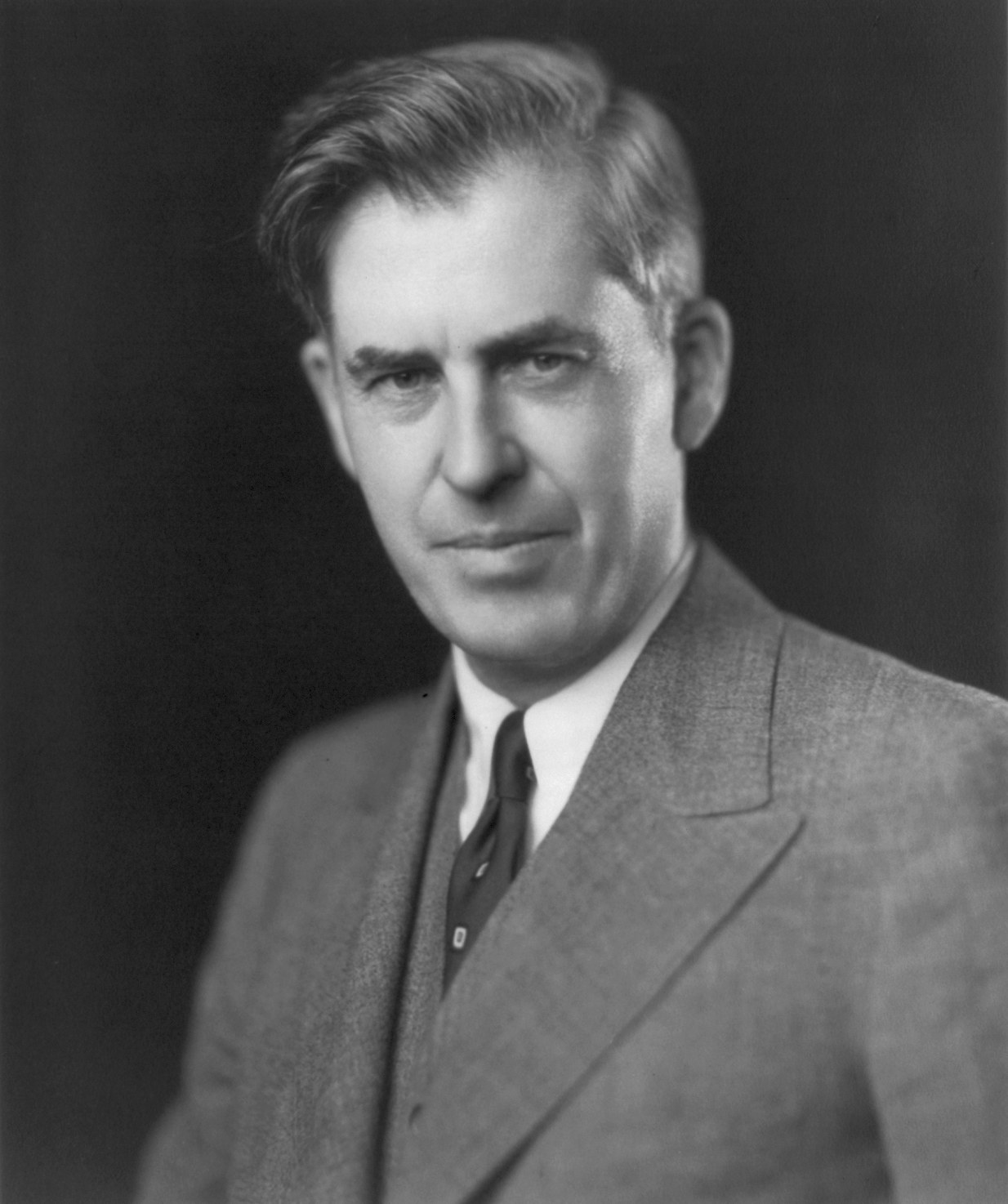
Henry A. Wallace becomes the 33rd U.S. vice president

- January 4 – The short subject Elmer's Pet Rabbit is released, marking the second appearance of Bugs Bunny, and also the first to have his name on a title card.
- January 6
  - Four Freedoms speech: During his State of the Union address, President Roosevelt presents his Four Freedoms as fundamental global human rights.
  - The keel of the USS Missouri is laid at the New York Navy Yard in Brooklyn.
- January 10 – The Lend-Lease law is introduced into the U.S. Congress.
- January 13 – All persons born in Puerto Rico since this day are declared U.S. citizens by birth, through U.S. federal law 8 U.S.C. § 1402.
- January 20 – Chief Justice Charles Evans Hughes swears in President Franklin D. Roosevelt for his third term. Henry A. Wallace is sworn in as the 33rd vice president.
- January 23 – Aviator Charles Lindbergh testifies before the U.S. Congress and recommends that the United States negotiate a neutrality pact with Adolf Hitler.
- January 27 – World War II – Attack on Pearl Harbor: U.S. Ambassador to Japan Joseph Grew passes on to Washington, D.C. a rumor overheard at a diplomatic reception about a planned surprise attack upon Pearl Harbor, Hawaii.
- January – The Parker 51 fountain pen is first sold.

=== February ===
- February 4 – World War II: The United Service Organization (USO) is created to entertain American troops.
- February 8 – World War II: The U.S. House of Representatives passes the Lend-Lease law.
- February 9 – Winston Churchill, in a worldwide broadcast, asks the United States to show its support by sending arms to the British: "Give us the tools, and we will finish the job."
- February 14 – World War II – Attack on Pearl Harbor: Admiral Kichisaburō Nomura begins his duties as Japanese ambassador to the United States.
- February 27 – The 13th Academy Awards, hosted by Bob Hope, are presented at Biltmore Hotel in Los Angeles, with Alfred Hitchcock's Rebecca winning Outstanding Production. The film also received the most nominations with 11, while The Thief of Baghdad wins the most awards with three. John Ford wins his second Best Director award for The Grapes of Wrath.

=== March ===
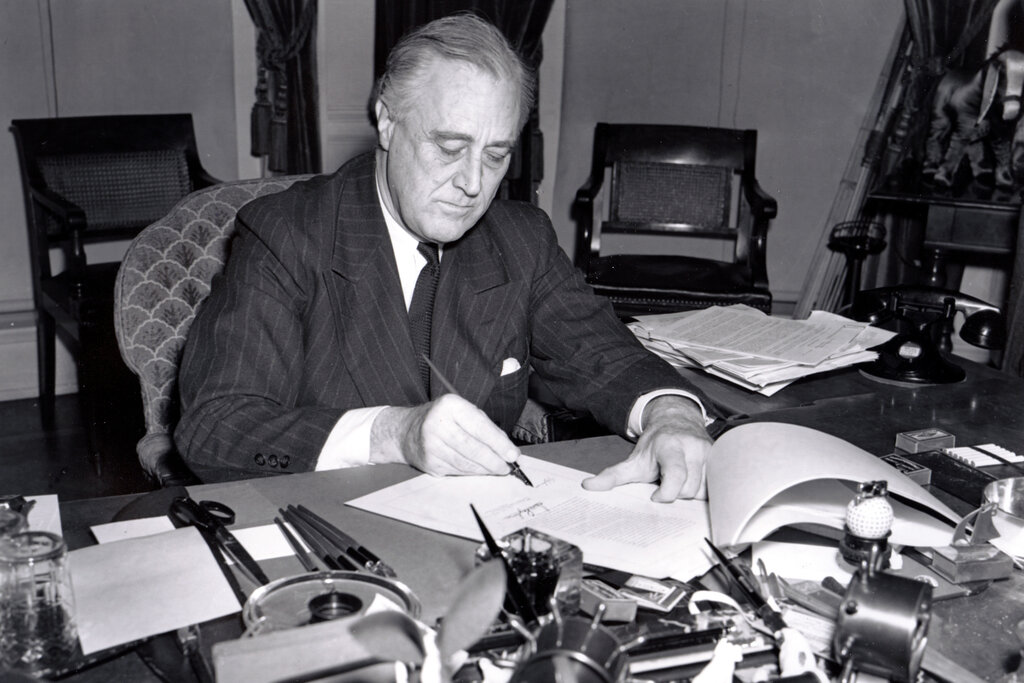
March 11: President Franklin D. Roosevelt signs the Lend-Lease law

- March – Captain America Comics #1 issues the first Captain America & Bucky comic. (cover date of Mar 1941, it was actually released the previous December)
- March 1
  - W47NV begins operations in Nashville, Tennessee, becoming the first fully licensed commercial FM radio station.
  - Arthur L. Bristol becomes Rear Admiral for the United States Navy's Support Force, Atlantic Fleet.
- March 4 – World War II: All US assets of Bulgarian nationals are frozen.
- March 8 – World War II: The U.S. Senate passes the Lend-Lease law.
- March 11 – World War II: President Roosevelt signs Lend-Lease into law, providing for the U.S. to give military equipment to the Allies.
- March 13 – World War II: All US assets of Hungarian nationals are frozen.
- March 17 – National Gallery of Art is officially opened by President Franklin D. Roosevelt.
- March 22 – Washington state's Grand Coulee Dam begins to generate electricity.
- March 24 – World War II: All US assets of Yugoslavian nationals are frozen.
- March 27 – World War II – Attack on Pearl Harbor: Japanese spy Takeo Yoshikawa arrives in Honolulu, Hawaii and begins to study the United States fleet at Pearl Harbor.
- March 30 – All German, Italian and Danish ships anchored in United States waters are taken into "protective custody".

=== April ===
- April 9 – The U.S. acquires full military defense rights in Greenland.
- April 10 – World War II: The U.S. destroyer Niblack, while picking up survivors from a sunken Dutch freighter, drops depth charges on a German U-boat (the first "shot in anger" fired by America against Germany).
- April 15 – World War II: The U.S. begins shipping Lend-Lease military equipment to China.
- April 23 – The America First Committee holds its first mass rally in New York City, with Charles Lindbergh as keynote speaker.
- April 25 – Franklin D. Roosevelt, at his regular press conference, criticizes Charles Lindbergh by comparing him to the Copperheads of the Civil War period. In response, Lindbergh resigns his commission in the U.S. Army Air Corps Reserve on April 28.
- April 28 – World War II: All US assets of Greek nationals are frozen.

=== May ===
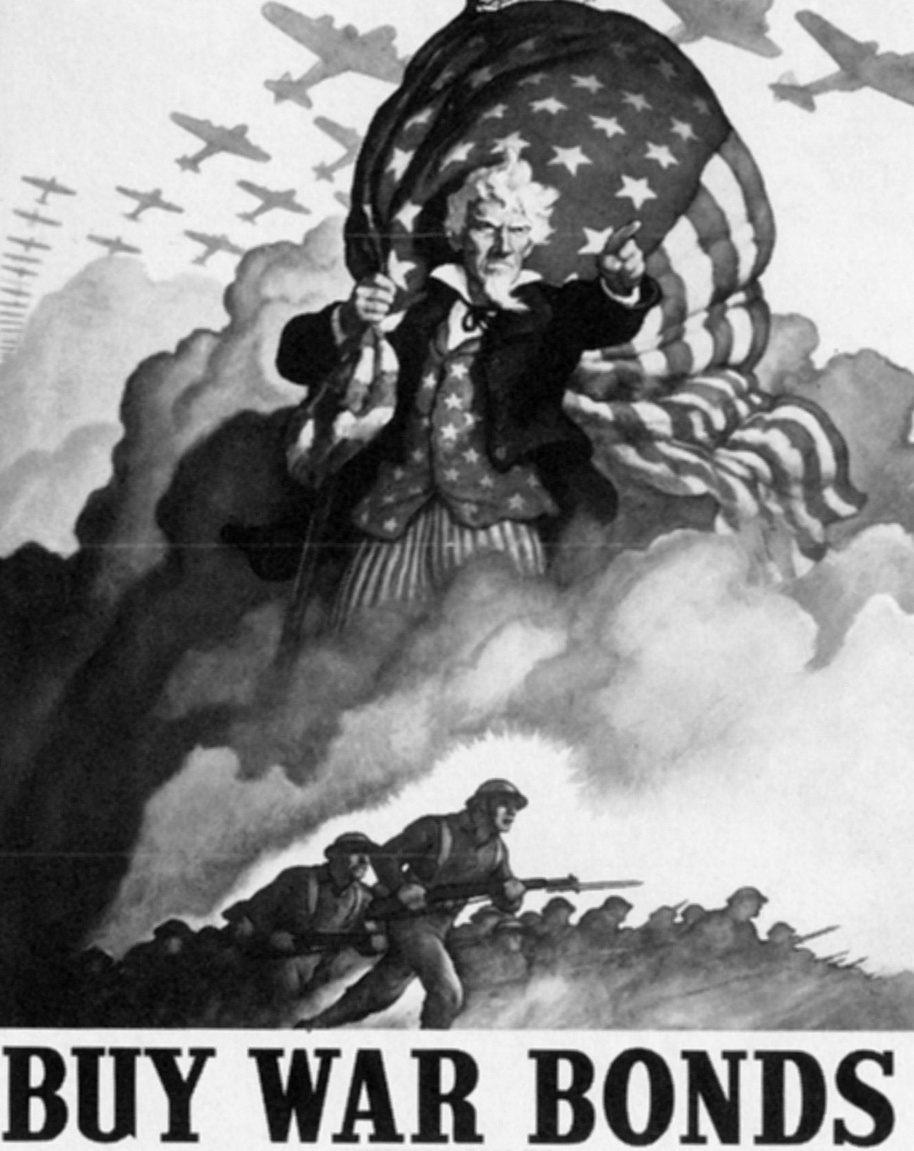
May 1: President Roosevelt buys the first War Bond

- May – Woody Guthrie records the Columbia River Ballads.
- May 1
  - Orson Welles' film Citizen Kane premieres in New York City.
  - The first Series E "War Bonds" and Defense Savings Stamps go on sale in the United States, to help fund the greatly increased production of military equipment.
- May 6 – At California's March Field, entertainer Bob Hope performs his first USO Show.
- May 15 – Joe DiMaggio's 56-game hitting streak begins as the New York Yankee center fielder goes one for 4 against Chicago White Sox pitcher Eddie Smith.
- May 21 – World War II: 950 miles off the coast of Brazil, the freighter SS Robin Moor becomes the first United States (neutral) ship sunk by a German U-boat, after its crew have been allowed to disembark.
- May 27 – World War II: President Roosevelt proclaims an "unlimited national emergency."

=== June ===
- June 14 – Executive Order 8785 is signed freezing all German and Italian assets in the United States. A census of all foreign assets are ordered under Executive Order 8389. Assets are also frozen from occupied countries/territories along with some neutral countries in Europe including Finland, Sweden, Spain, Andorra, Portugal, Switzerland, San Marino, and Liechtenstein.
- June 16
  - All German and Italian consulates in the United States are ordered closed and their staffs to leave the country by July 10.
  - Official start of production at Ford's Willow Run facility (Air Force Plant 31) in Michigan. At its wartime peak, it will produce one B-24 bomber every hour.
- June 20
  - The United States Army Air Forces comes into being, taking over the former United States Army Air Corps.
  - Walt Disney's live-action animated feature The Reluctant Dragon is released.

=== July ===
- July 1
  - Mammoth Cave National Park is authorized by Congress.
  - Commercial television is authorized by the Federal Communications Commission.
  - NBC Television begins commercial operation on WNBT, on Channel 1. The world's first legal TV commercial, for Bulova watches, occurs at 2:29 PM over WNBT, before a baseball game between the Brooklyn Dodgers and Philadelphia Phillies. The 10-second spot displays a picture of a clock superimposed on a map of the United States, accompanied by the voice-over "America runs on Bulova time." As a one-off special, the first quiz show called "Uncle Bee" is telecast on WNBT's inaugural broadcast day, followed later the same day by Ralph Edwards hosting the second game show broadcast on U.S. television, Truth or Consequences, as simulcast on radio and TV and sponsored by Ivory Soap. Weekly broadcasts of the show commence in 1956, with Bob Barker.
  - CBS Television begins commercial operation on New York station WCBW (modern-day WCBS-TV), on Channel 2.
- July 7 – World War II: American forces take over the defense of Iceland from the British.
- July 23 – Hero thrill show is held in Philadelphia.
- July 26
  - World War II: In response to the Japanese occupation of French Indochina, U.S. President Franklin D. Roosevelt orders the freezing of all Japanese assets in the United States.
  - World War II: General Douglas MacArthur is named commander of all U.S. forces in the Philippines; the Philippines Army is ordered nationalized by President Roosevelt.
- July 28 – World War II: Japan freezes all American assets. After the United States froze Japanese assets the Japanese responded by freezing the assets of the United States, United Kingdom and the Netherlands.
- July 30 – World War II: The U.S. gunboat Tutuila is attacked by Japanese aircraft while anchored in the Yangtze River at Chungking. Japan apologizes for the incident the following day.
- July – The Lockheed P-38 Lightning fighter aircraft is introduced.

=== August ===
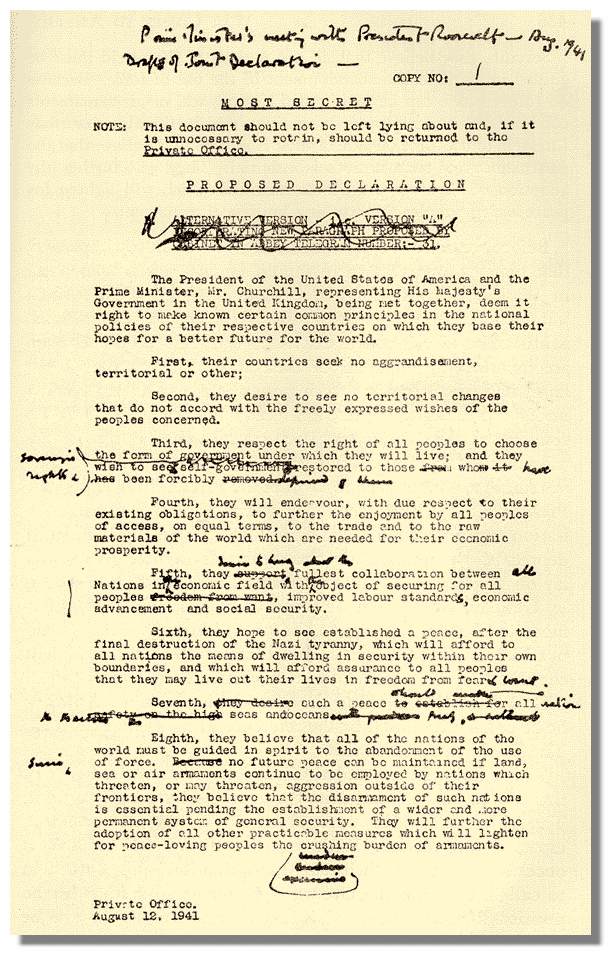
August 14: The Atlantic Charter issued

- August 1 – U.S. President Franklin D. Roosevelt bans the export of U.S. aviation fuel from the western hemisphere except to Britain and allies.
- August 6 – Six-year-old Elaine Esposito undergoes an appendectomy and lapses into a coma that lasts for a record-breaking 37 years until her death in 1978.
- August 9 – Franklin D. Roosevelt and Winston Churchill meet at Argentia, Newfoundland and Labrador. The Atlantic Charter is created as a result.
- August 12 – By one vote (203–202), the U.S. House of Representatives passes legislation extending the draft period for selectees and the National Guard from 1 year to 30 months.
- August 31 – The Great Gildersleeve debuts on NBC Radio.

=== September ===
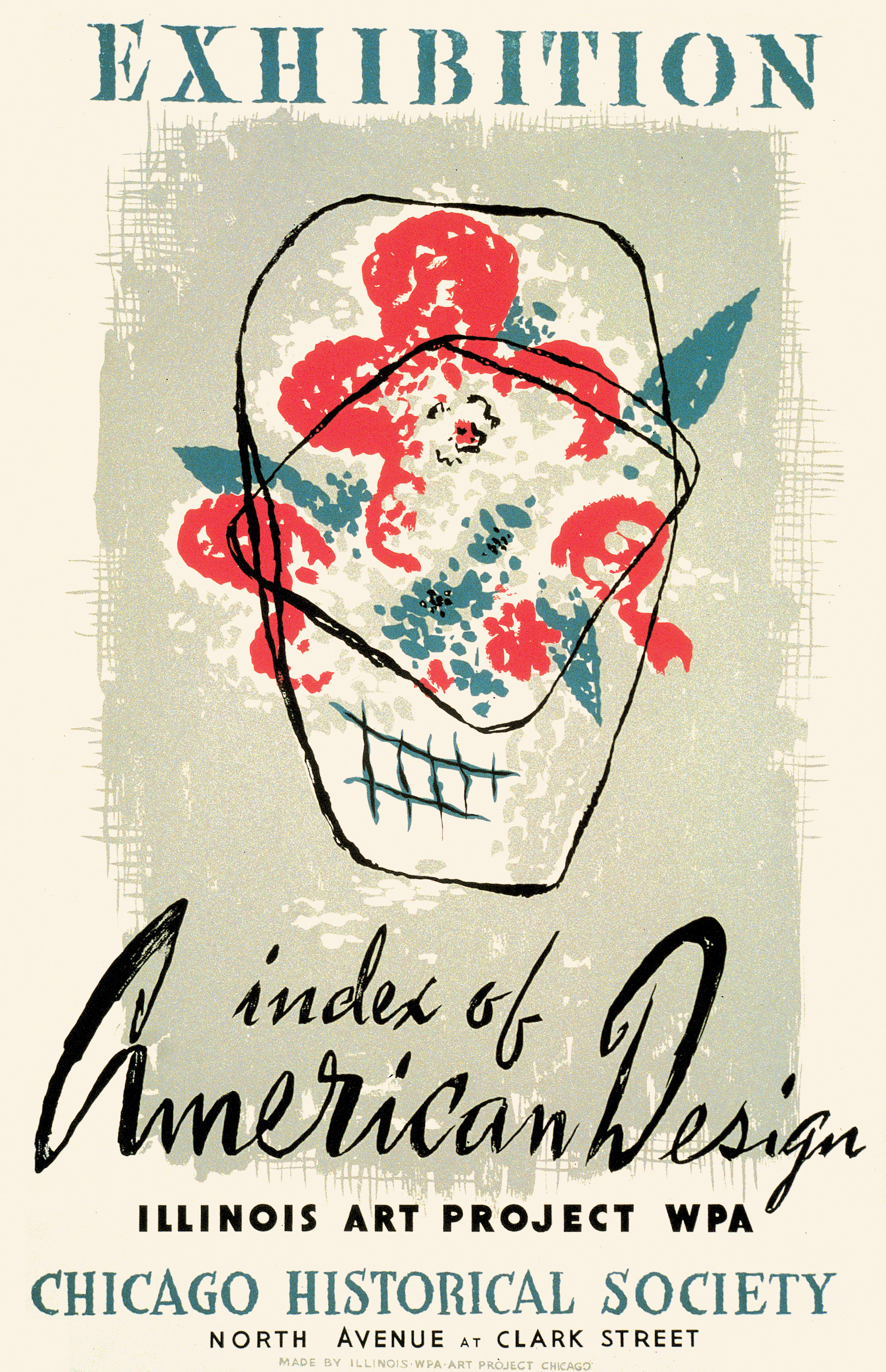
American Design exhibit 1941, Chicago, poster by WPA Art Project

- September 4 – World War II: The USS Greer becomes the first United States Navy ship fired upon by a German submarine in the war, even though the United States is a neutral power. Tension heightens between the nations as a result.
- September 11 – World War II: Charles Lindbergh, at an America First Committee rally in Des Moines, Iowa, accuses "the British, the Jewish, and the Roosevelt administration" of leading the United States toward war. Widespread condemnation of Lindbergh follows.
- September 27 – The first liberty ship, the SS Patrick Henry, is launched at Baltimore.
- September 29 – World War II: The first Moscow Conference begins; U.S. representative Averell Harriman and British representative Lord Beaverbrook meet with Soviet foreign minister Molotov to arrange urgent assistance for Russia.

=== October ===
- October 6 – The New York Yankees defeat the Brooklyn Dodgers, 4 games to 1, to win their 9th World Series Title.
- October 17 – World War II: The destroyer USS Kearny is torpedoed and damaged by German submarine U-568 off Iceland, killing 11 sailors (the first American military casualties of the war).
- October 23 – Walt Disney's fourth animated film, Dumbo, is released to recoup the initial financial losses of both Pinocchio and Fantasia the year prior.
- October 30 – World War II: Franklin D. Roosevelt approves US$1 billion in Lend-Lease aid to the Soviet Union.
- October 31
  - After 14 years, work ceases on sculpting Mount Rushmore National Memorial.
  - World War II: The destroyer USS Reuben James is torpedoed and sunk by German submarine U-552 off Iceland, killing more than 100 U.S. Navy sailors.

=== November ===
- November 10 – In a speech at the Mansion House, London, Winston Churchill promises, "should the United States become involved in war with Japan, the British declaration will follow within the hour."
- November 14
  - World War II – Attack on Pearl Harbor: Japanese diplomat Saburō Kurusu arrives in the United States to assist Ambassador Kichisaburō Nomura in peace negotiations.
  - The 5.4 M_{s} Los Angeles earthquake severely affected the Gardena–Torrance area of California with a maximum Mercalli intensity of VIII (Severe), causing $1.1 million in financial losses, but no injuries or deaths.
- November 17 – World War II – Attack on Pearl Harbor: Joseph Grew, the United States ambassador to Japan, cables to Washington, D.C., a warning that Japan may strike suddenly and unexpectedly at any time.
- November 24 – World War II: The United States grants Lend-Lease to the Free French.
- November 26
  - U.S. President Franklin D. Roosevelt signs a bill establishing the 4th Thursday in November as Thanksgiving Day in the United States (this partly reverses a 1939 action by Roosevelt that changed the celebration of Thanksgiving to the third Thursday of November).
  - The Hull note ultimatum is delivered to Japan by the United States.
- November 27
  - A group of young men stop traffic on U.S. Highway 99 south of Yreka, California, handing out fliers proclaiming the establishment of the State of Jefferson.
  - World War II – Attack on Pearl Harbor: All U.S. military forces in Asia and the Pacific are placed on war alert.

=== December ===
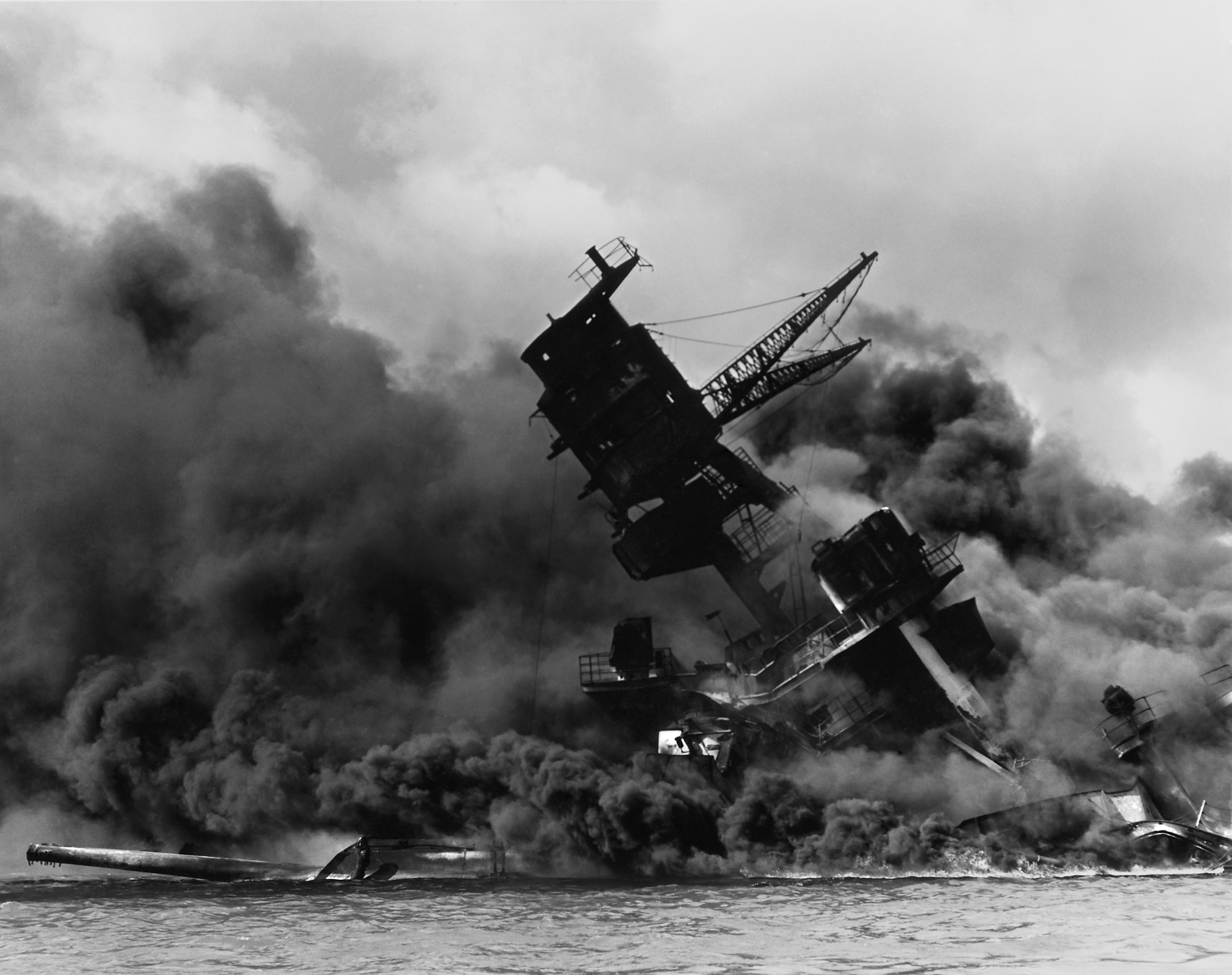
December 7: Attack on Pearl Harbor

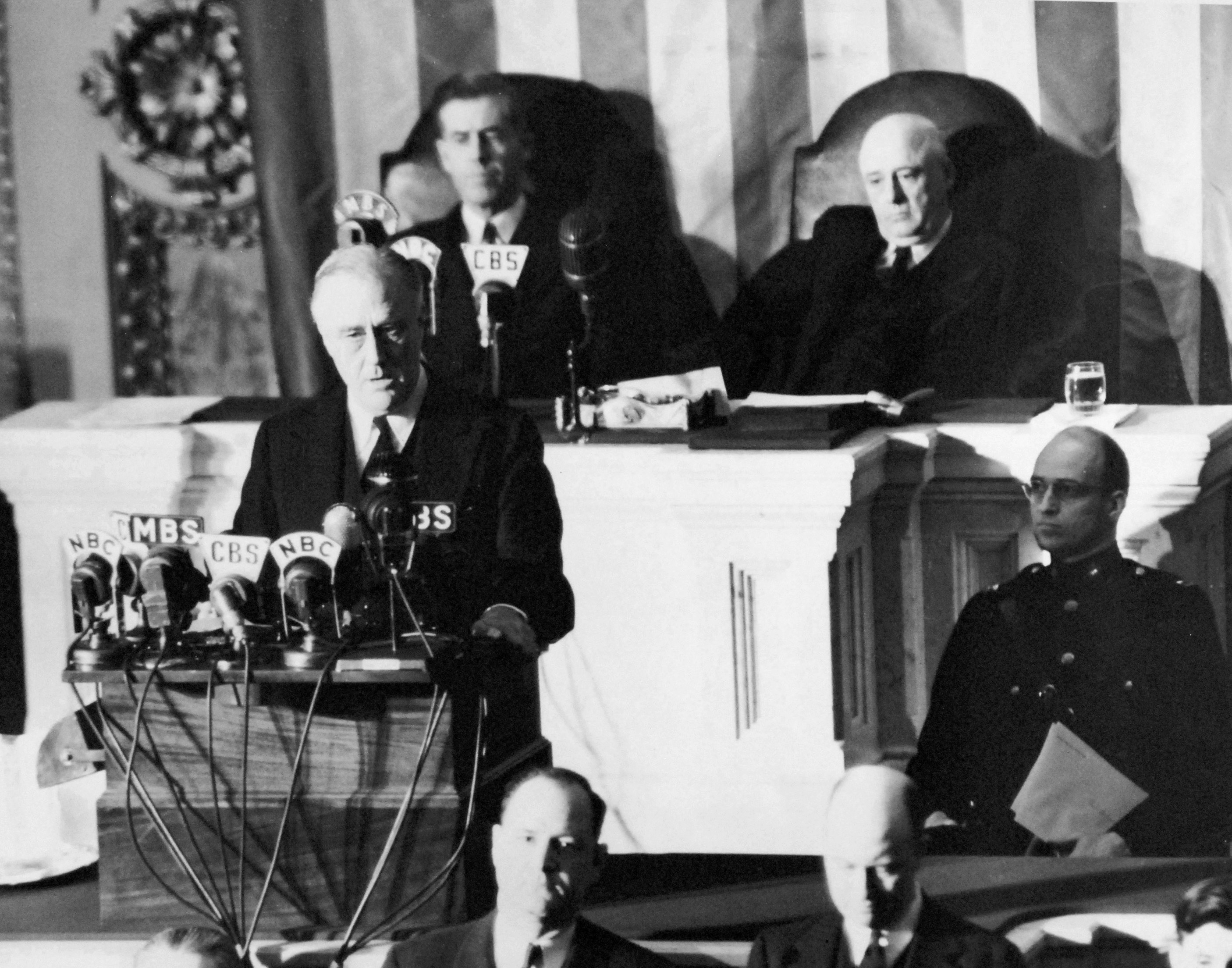
December 8: Infamy Speech and declaration of war on Japan

- Wonder Woman comic begins publication.
- December 1 – Fiorello La Guardia, Mayor of New York City and Director of the Office of Civilian Defense, signs Administrative Order 9, creating the Civil Air Patrol under the authority of the United States Army Air Forces.
- December 4 – The State of Jefferson is declared in Yreka, California, with John C. Childs as a governor.
- December 6 – World War II: Attack on Pearl Harbor – Franklin D. Roosevelt makes a personal peace appeal to Emperor Hirohito of Japan.
- December 7 (07:48 Hawaiian Time; 12:48 EST; December 8 03:18 Japan Standard Time) – Attack on Pearl Harbor: The Imperial Japanese Navy Air Service stages a military strike on the United States Navy fleet at Pearl Harbor in the Territory of Hawaii, thus drawing the U.S. into World War II.
- December 8
  - World War II (12:30 EST): Franklin Roosevelt gives his Infamy Speech to a joint session of Congress. Within an hour the United States declaration of war on Japan is signed.
  - The exhibition American Negro Art: Nineteenth and Twentieth Centuries opens in Edith Halpert's Downtown Gallery in New York City.
- December 9 – World War II: All assets from Thailand are frozen.
- December 11 – World War II:
  - American forces repel a Japanese landing attempt at Wake Island.
  - Germany and Italy declare war on the United States. The U.S. responds in kind.
  - Hungary severs diplomatic relations with the United States.
- December 12 – World War II:
  - Romania declares war on the United States with diplomatic relations also being severed by the two countries. The United States later declares war on Romania on June 5, 1942.
  - The U.S. seizes the French transatlantic liner SS Normandie.
- December 13 – World War II:
  - Bulgaria declares war on the United States with diplomatic relations being severed by both countries. The United States does not declare war on Bulgaria until June 5, 1942.
  - Hungary declares war on the United States but war is not declared on Hungary by the United States until June 5, 1942.
- December 19 – The United States Naval Academy in Annapolis, Maryland graduates its "Class of 1942" a semester early so as to induct the graduating students without delay into the U.S. Navy and/or Marine Corps as officers, for immediate stationing in the war.
- December 20 – Admiral Ernest King is appointed Commander-in-Chief of the U.S. fleet.
- December 23 – World War II: A second Japanese landing attempt on Wake Island is successful and the American garrison surrenders after a full night and morning of fighting.
- December 26 – World War II: British Prime Minister Winston Churchill addresses a joint session of the U.S. Congress.

=== Ongoing ===
- World War II, U.S. involvement (1941–1945)

=== Undated ===
- The Centenary College Choir (America's Singing Ambassadors) is formed by Dr. A. C. Voran at Centenary College of Louisiana.
- This calendar year is the wettest on record in Utah with 20.33 inches (516.4 mm), Colorado with 25.52 inches (648.2 mm) and New Mexico with 26.57 inches (674.9 mm) against a mean of only 13.74 inches or 349.0 millimetres.
- In contrast to the wetness in the West, it is the driest calendar year in Tennessee with only 36.44 inches (925.6 mm) versus a mean of 50.97 inches or 1,294.6 millimetres and New Hampshire with 32.65 inches (829.3 mm) against a mean of 42.74 inches or 1,085.6 millimetres.

== Sport ==
- April 12 – The Boston Bruins won their third Stanley Cup, and last until 1970, defeating the Detroit Red Wings 4 games to 0. The deciding Game 4 was played at Detroit's Olympia Arena.

Baseball would see achievements being measured. The two measures recorded during the 1941 campaign both stand to this day and have yet to be broken. 1941 saw Joe DiMaggio step up to the plate in 56 consecutive baseball games and to break a record that had stood since 1897 when Wee Willie Keeler totaled 45 consecutive games hitting safely over the course of the 1896 and 97 seasons. Ted Williams managed to record a batting average over .400 by finishing the season with a .406 batting average.

== Births ==
=== January ===
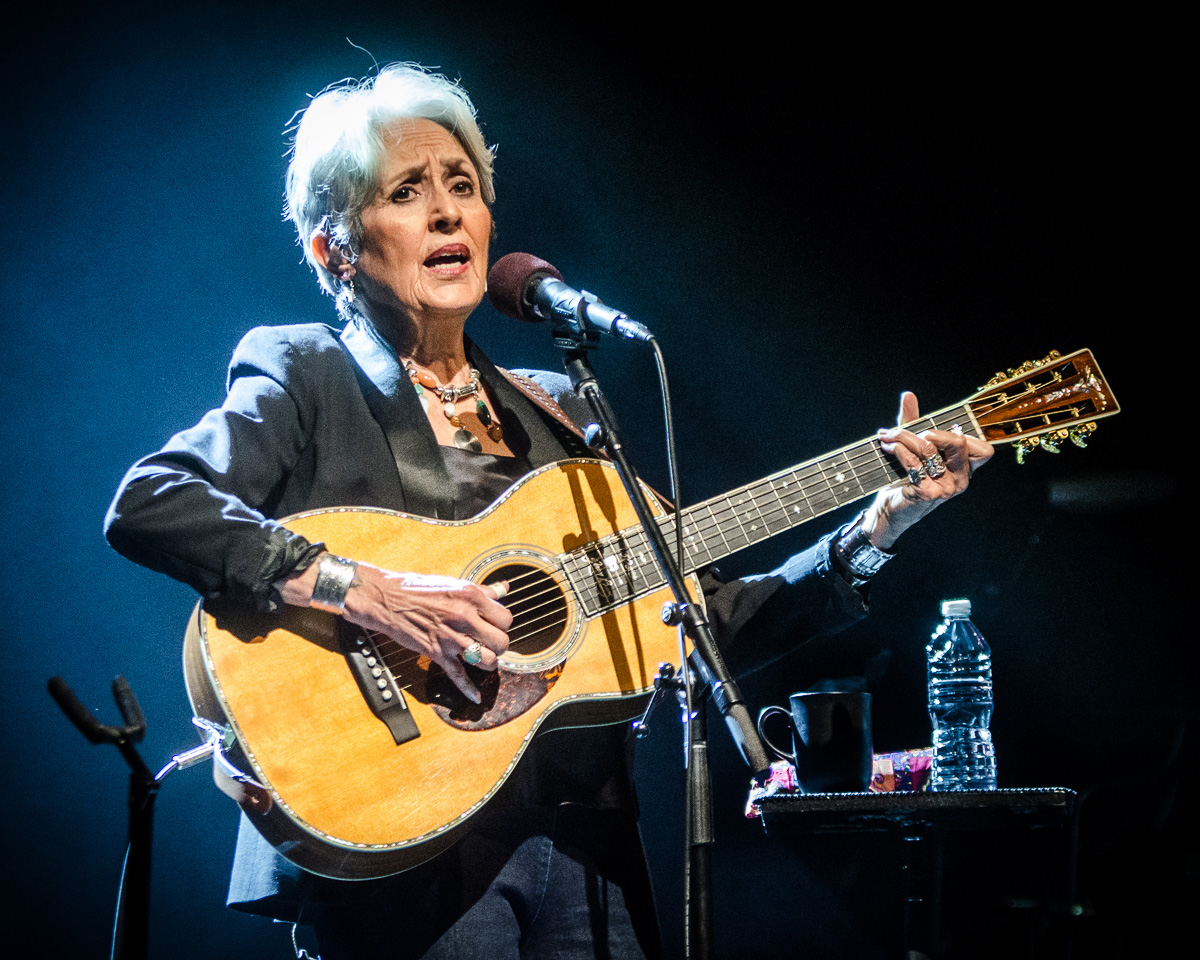
Joan Baez

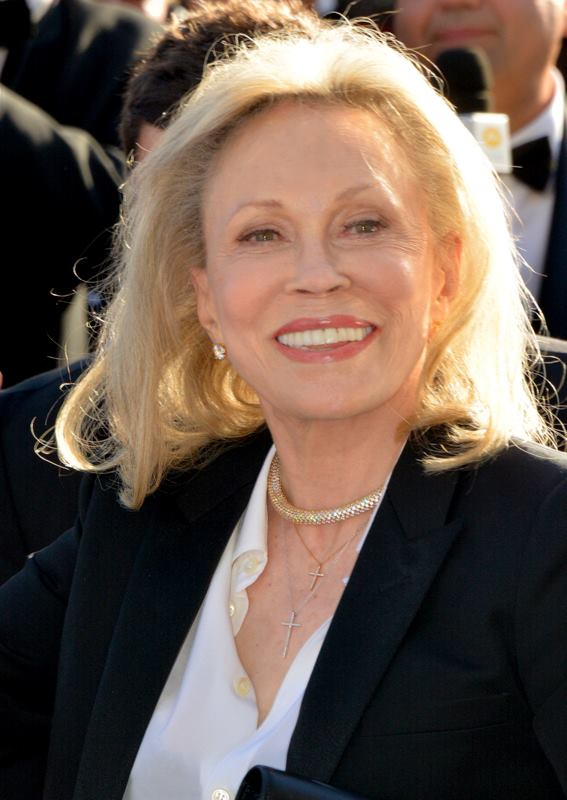
Faye Dunaway

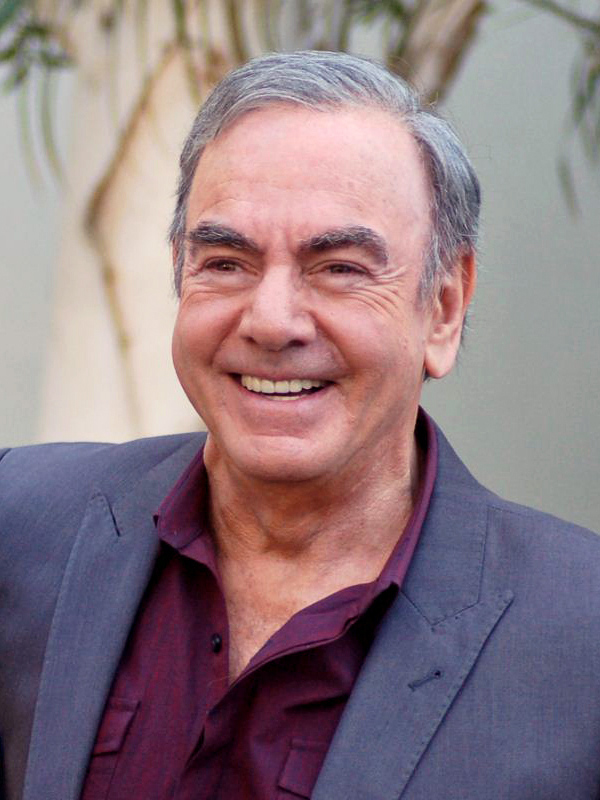
Neil Diamond

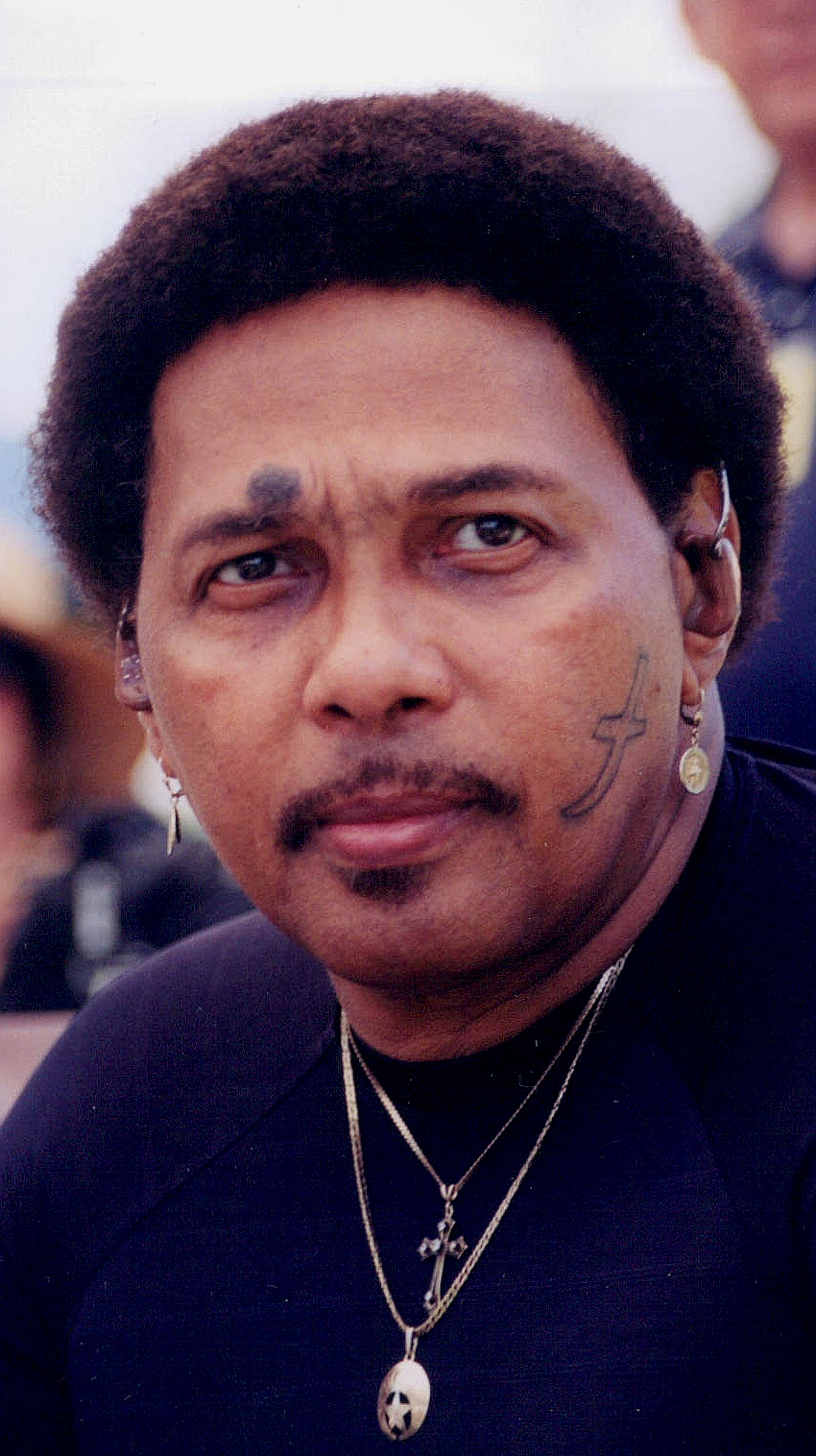
Aaron Neville

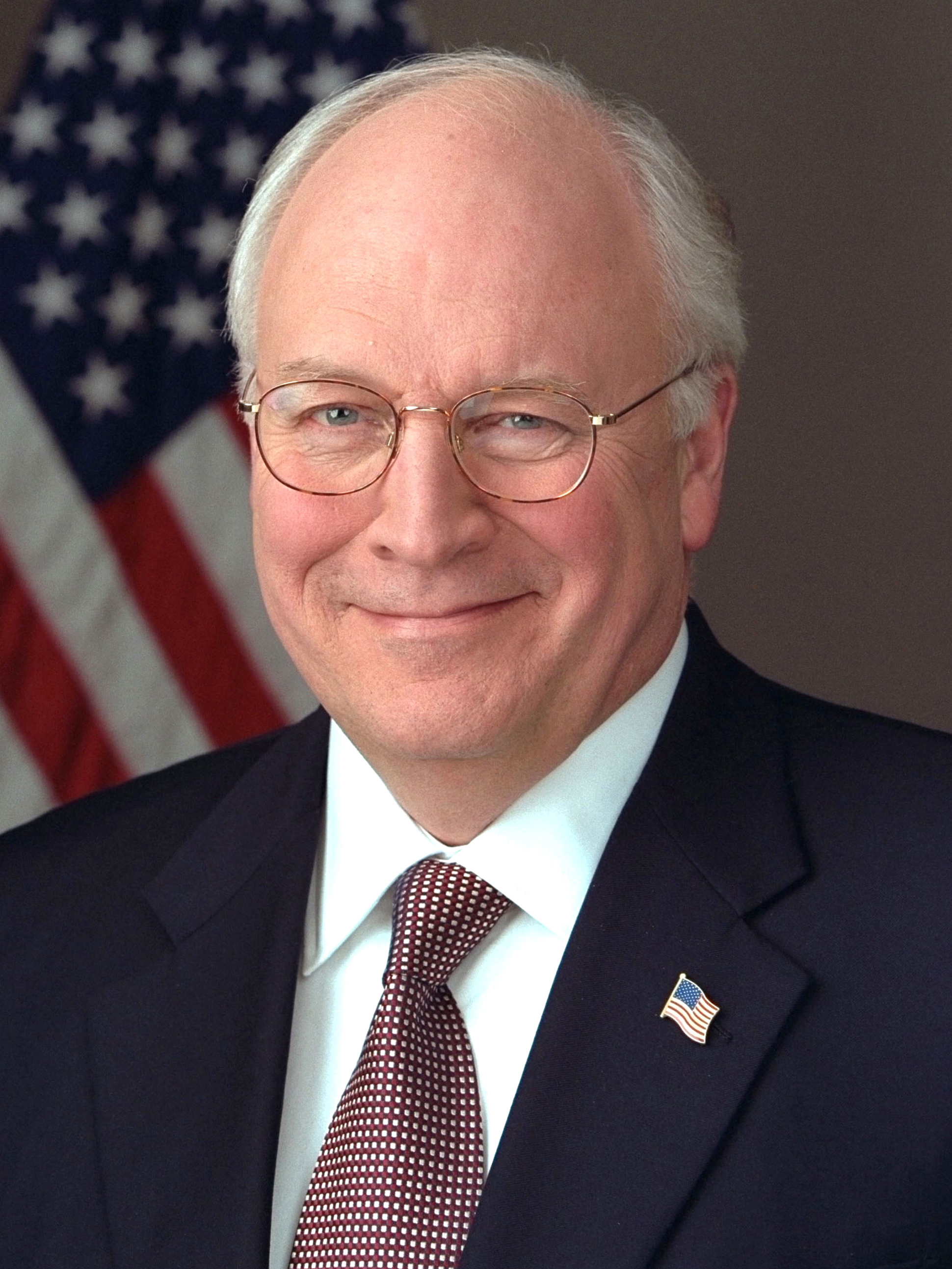
Dick Cheney

- January 1 – Marshall "Rock" Jones, African-American bass player (Ohio Players) (d. 2016)
- January 4
  - Maureen Reagan, American political activist (d. 2001)
  - John Bennett Perry, American actor, singer and former model
- January 5
  - Harvey Hall, American businessman, politician (d. 2018)
  - Chuck McKinley, American tennis player (d. 1986)
- January 7
  - Harvey Evans, American actor (d. 2021)
  - Frederick D. Gregory, American pilot and astronaut
  - Joanne Pierce Misko, American nun and FBI agent (d. 2024)
- January 9 – Joan Baez, American singer, songwriter and activist
- January 11
  - Dave Edwards, American musician (d. 2000)
  - Jimmy Velvit, American singer/songwriter
- January 14 – Faye Dunaway, American actress
- January 15 – Captain Beefheart, American singer (d. 2010)
- January 18
  - Bobby Goldsboro, American pop and country singer-songwriter
  - David Ruffin, African-American singer (The Temptations) (d. 1991)
- January 19 – Pat Patterson, Canadian-American pro wrestler (d. 2020)
- January 20 – Clift Tsuji, American politician (d. 2016)
- January 21 – Richie Havens, African-American musician (d. 2013)
- January 23 – Buddy Buie, American songwriter, record producer (d. 2015)
- January 24
  - Neil Diamond, American singer, songwriter
  - Aaron Neville, African-American singer
- January 30 – Dick Cheney, 46th vice president of the United States from 2001 to 2009 (d. 2025)
- January 31
  - Lynne Abraham, American lawyer, District Attorney of Philadelphia (1991–2010)
  - Dick Gephardt, American politician
  - Jessica Walter, American actress (d. 2021)

=== February ===
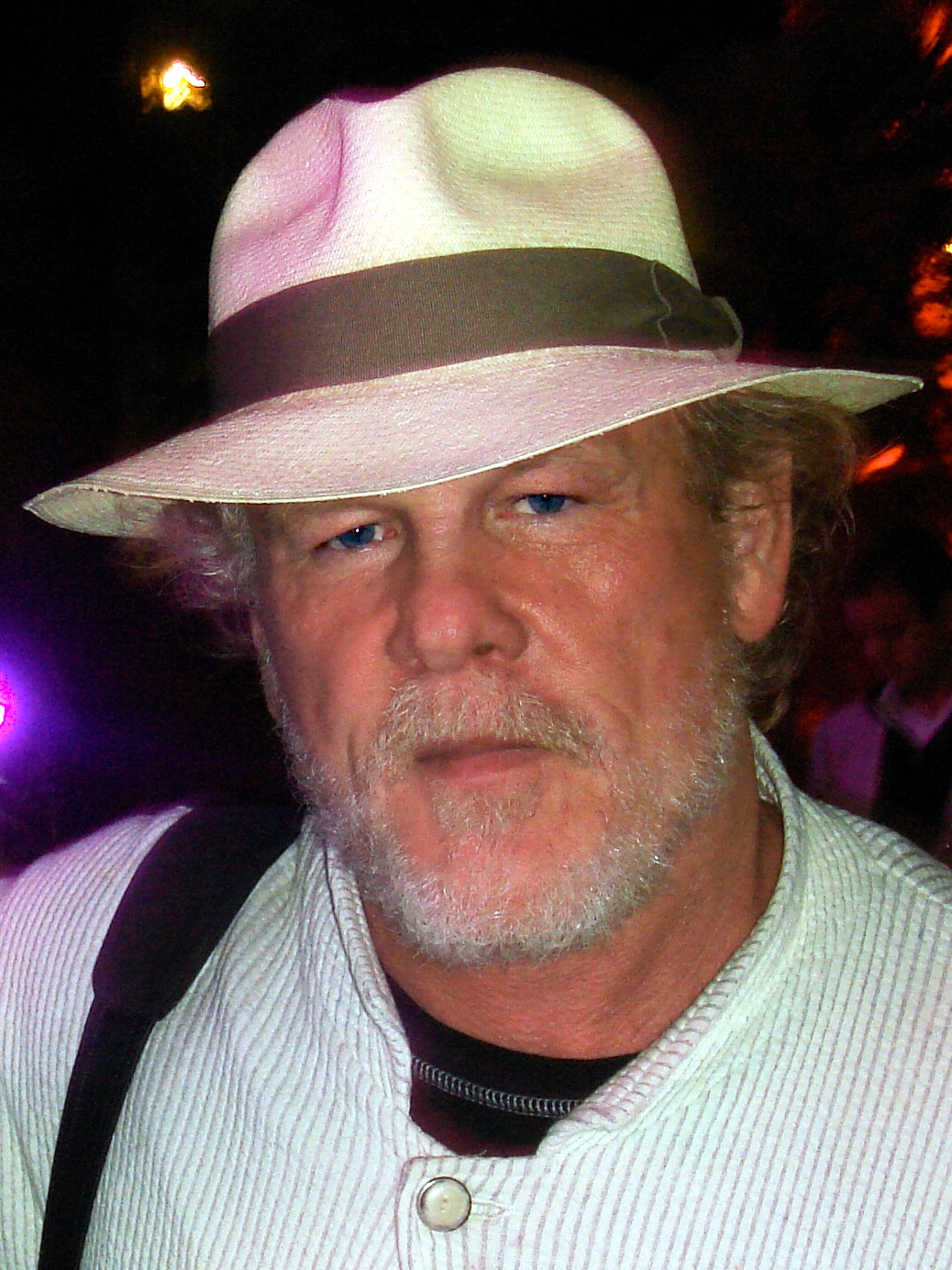
Nick Nolte

- February 1
  - Arnold Shapiro, American television producer
  - Jerry Spinelli, American author
- February 3
  - Dory Funk Jr., American professional wrestler
  - Howard Phillips, American politician (d. 2013)
- February 5
  - Stephen J. Cannell, American director, producer (d. 2010)
  - Henson Cargill, American country music singer (d. 2007)
  - David Selby, American actor
  - Barrett Strong, American Motown singer-songwriter (d. 2023)
  - Cory Wells, American rock singer (Three Dog Night) (d. 2015)
- February 6
  - Stephen Albert, American composer (d. 1992)
  - Spencer Silver, American chemist and inventor (d. 2021)
- February 8
  - Nick Nolte, American actor
  - Tom Rush, American folk and blues singer
- February 9 – Kermit Gosnell, American abortion provider and convicted child murderer
- February 10 – Dick Carlson, American journalist and diplomat (d. 2025)
- February 11 – Sonny Landham, American actor (d. 2017)
- February 13 – David Jeremiah, American televangelist
- February 16 – Bill Tobin, American football player and executive (d. 2024)
- February 17 – Ron Meyer, American football coach (d. 2017)
- February 18 – Irma Thomas, African-American singer
- February 19 – David Gross, American physicist, Nobel Prize laureate
- February 20 – Buffy Sainte-Marie, musician, composer, and social activist
- February 25 – Sandy Bull, American folk musician, composer (d. 2001)
- February 28
  - Alice Brock, artist, author and restaurateur (d. 2024)
  - Leonard Riggio, American businessman (d. 2024)

=== March ===
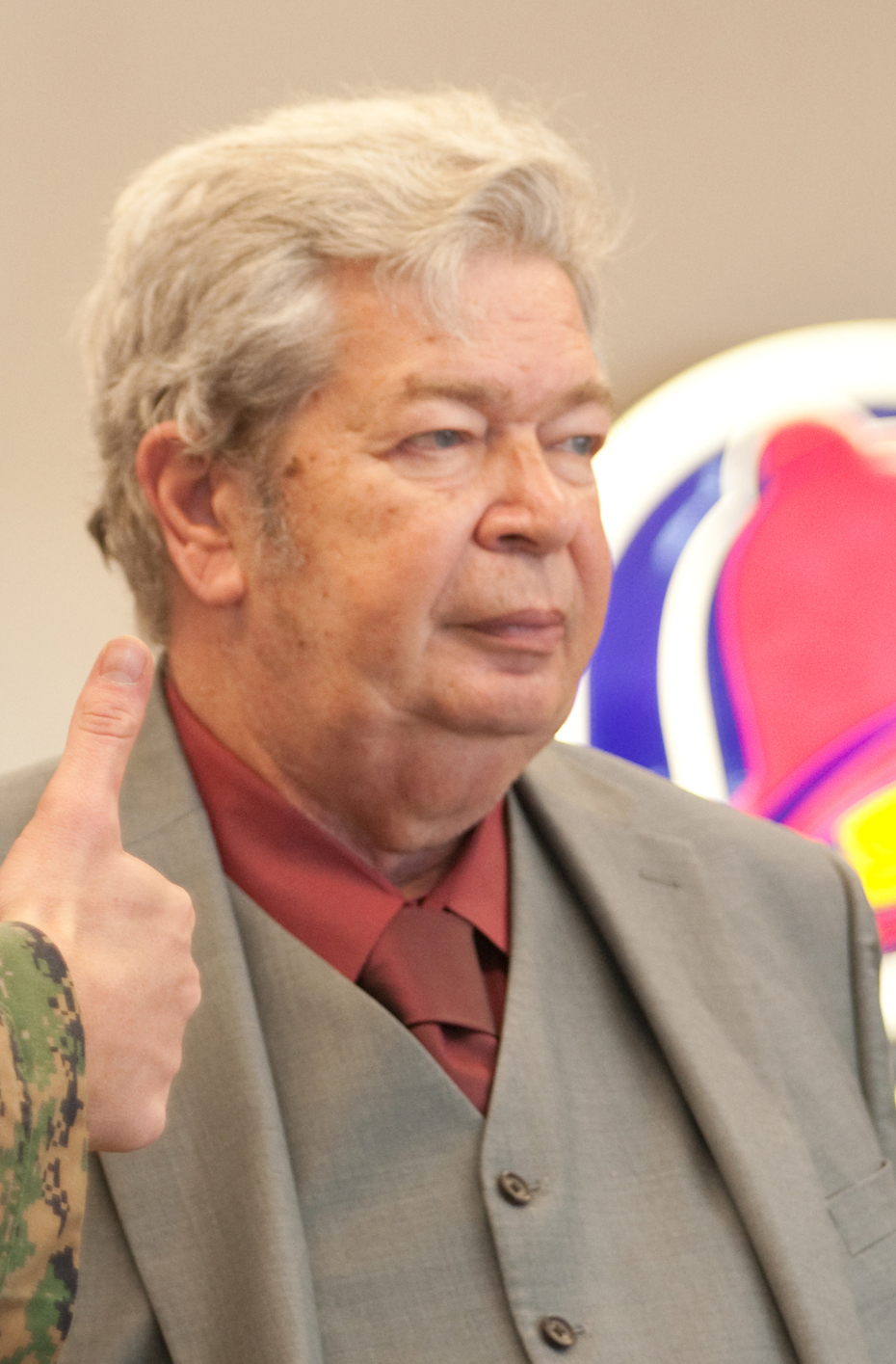
Richard Benjamin Harrison

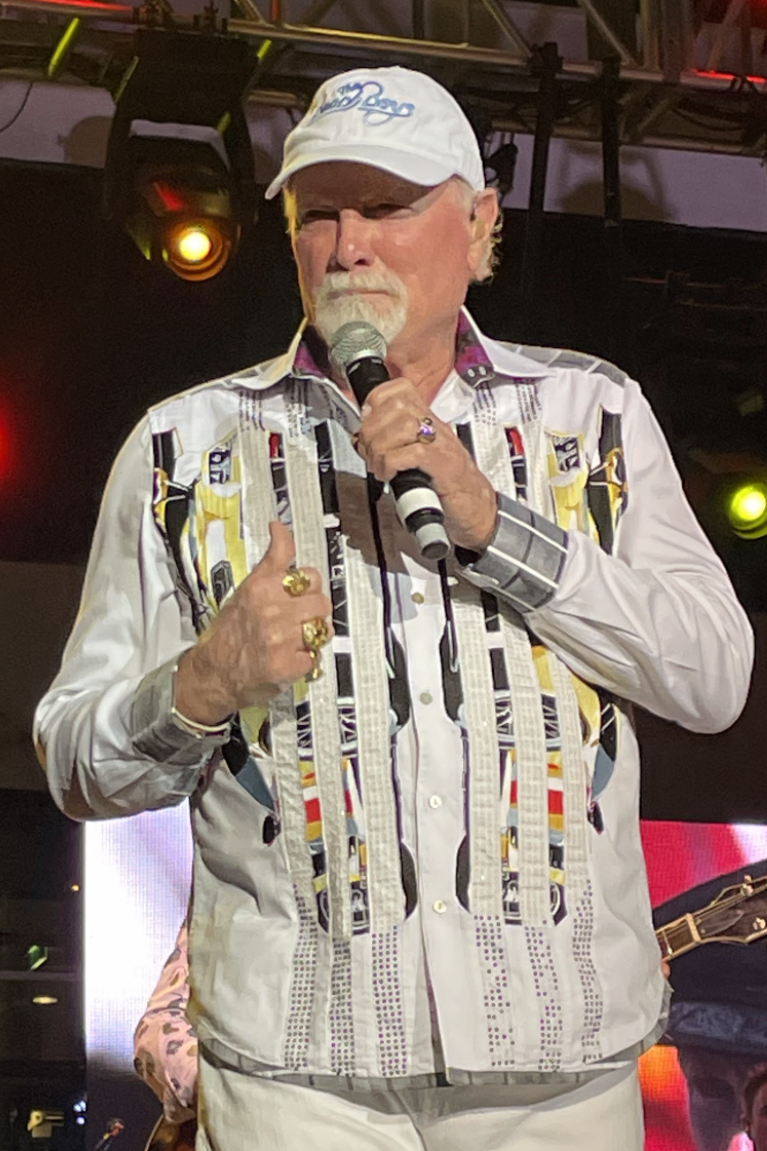
Mike Love

- March 4
  - Richard Benjamin Harrison, American businessman, reality TV star (d. 2018)
  - James Zagel, American attorney and judge (d. 2023)
- March 5
  - Stanley Cowell, American jazz pianist (d. 2020)
  - Phil Roof, American baseball player
- March 8 – James Reston Jr., American journalist and writer (d. 2023)
- March 9 – Ernesto Miranda, American criminal (d. 1976)
- March 10 – George Smith, biochemist, recipient of the Nobel Prize in Chemistry in 2018
- March 15 – Mike Love, American musician (The Beach Boys)
- March 16 – Chuck Woolery, American game show host (d. 2024)
- March 17 – Paul Kantner, American rock guitarist (Jefferson Airplane) (d. 2016)
- March 18 – Wilson Pickett, African-American singer (d. 2006)
- March 20
  - Pat Corrales, American baseball player and coach (d. 2023)
  - Paul Junger Witt, American film & television producer (d. 2018)
- March 23 – Jim Trelease, American educator, author (d. 2022)
- March 24 – Michael Masser, songwriter, composer and producer of popular music (d. 2015)
- March 27 – Bunny Sigler, American singer, songwriter and record producer (d. 2017)
- March 28
  - Alf Clausen, American composer
  - Jeffrey Moussaieff Masson, American author and academic
  - Charles Swenson, American animator
  - Jim Turner, American football player (d. 2023)
- March 29
  - John W. Hyde, American producer
  - Joseph Hooton Taylor, Jr., American astrophysicist, Nobel Prize laureate
- March 30 – Bob Smith, American politician

=== April ===
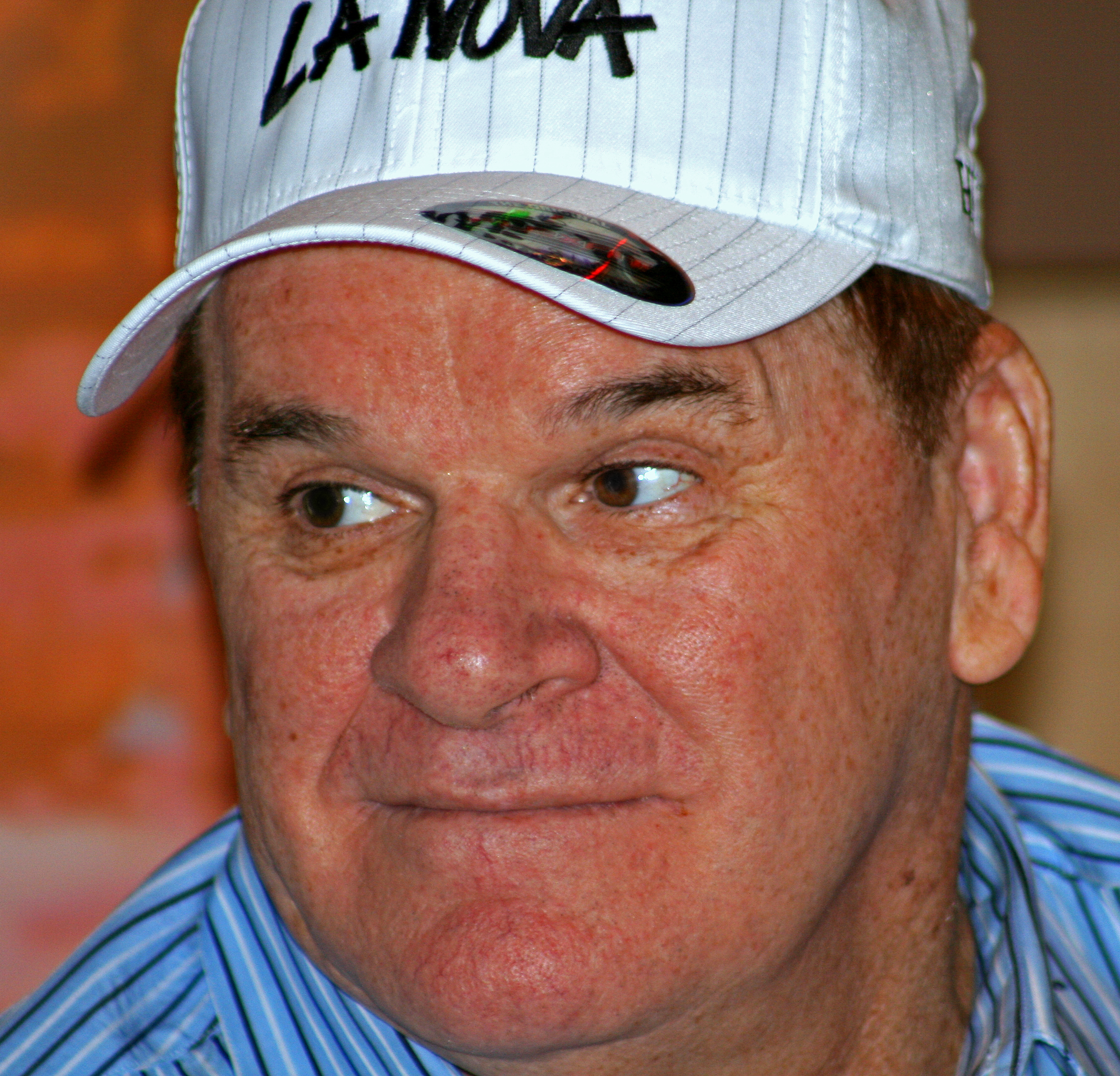
Pete Rose

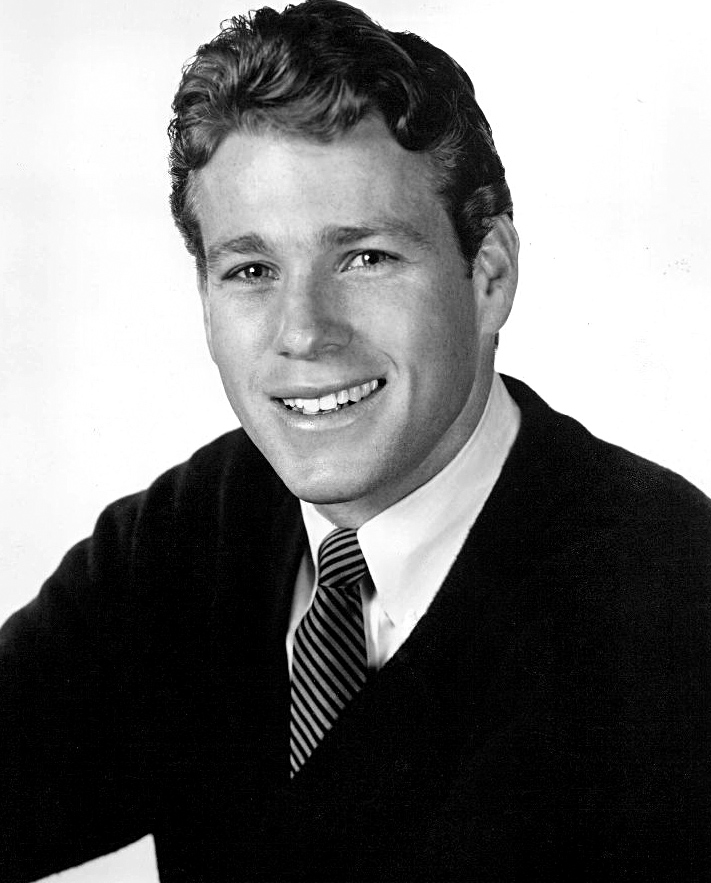
Ryan O'Neal

- April 2 – Dr. Demento (Barret Eugene Hansen), American radio disc jockey, novelty music collector
- April 3
  - Jan Berry, American singer (Jan & Dean) (d. 2004)
  - Philippé Wynne, American musician (d. 1984)
- April 6 – Phil Austin, American comedian (The Firesign Theater) (d. 2015)
- April 8 – Peggy Lennon, American singer (The Lennon Sisters)
- April 9 – Kay Adams, American country singer
- April 10 – Paul Theroux, novelist and travel writer
- April 12 – Dave Kindred, American sportswriter
- April 13
  - Michael Stuart Brown, American geneticist, recipient of the Nobel Prize in Physiology or Medicine
  - Harvey Pratt, Native American forensic artist d. 2025)
- April 14 – Pete Rose, American baseball player (d. 2024)
- April 20 – Ryan O'Neal, American actor (Love Story) (d. 2023)
- April 21 – David Boren, American politician (d. 2025)
- April 23 – Ray Tomlinson, American computer programmer (d. 2016)
- April 24 – Richard Holbrooke, American diplomat (d. 2010)
- April 26 – John C. Mitchell, American composer and educator
- April 27
  - Judith Blegen, American soprano (d. 2026)
  - Pat Choate, American economist, politician
  - H. Tristram Engelhardt Jr., American philosopher (d. 2018)
  - Lee Roy Jordan, American football player (d. 2025)
- April 28 – K. Barry Sharpless, American chemist, double Nobel Prize laureate

=== May ===
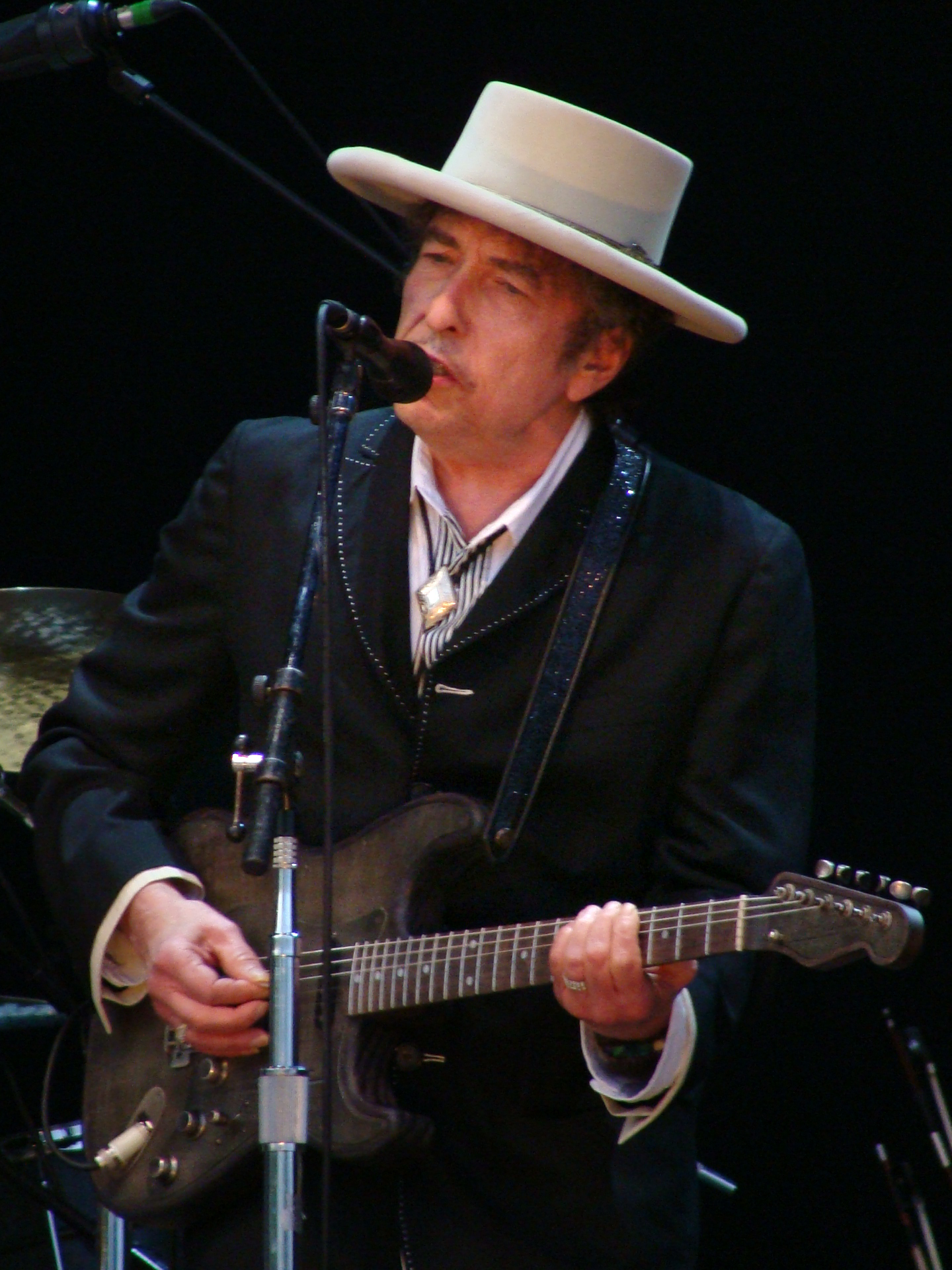
Bob Dylan

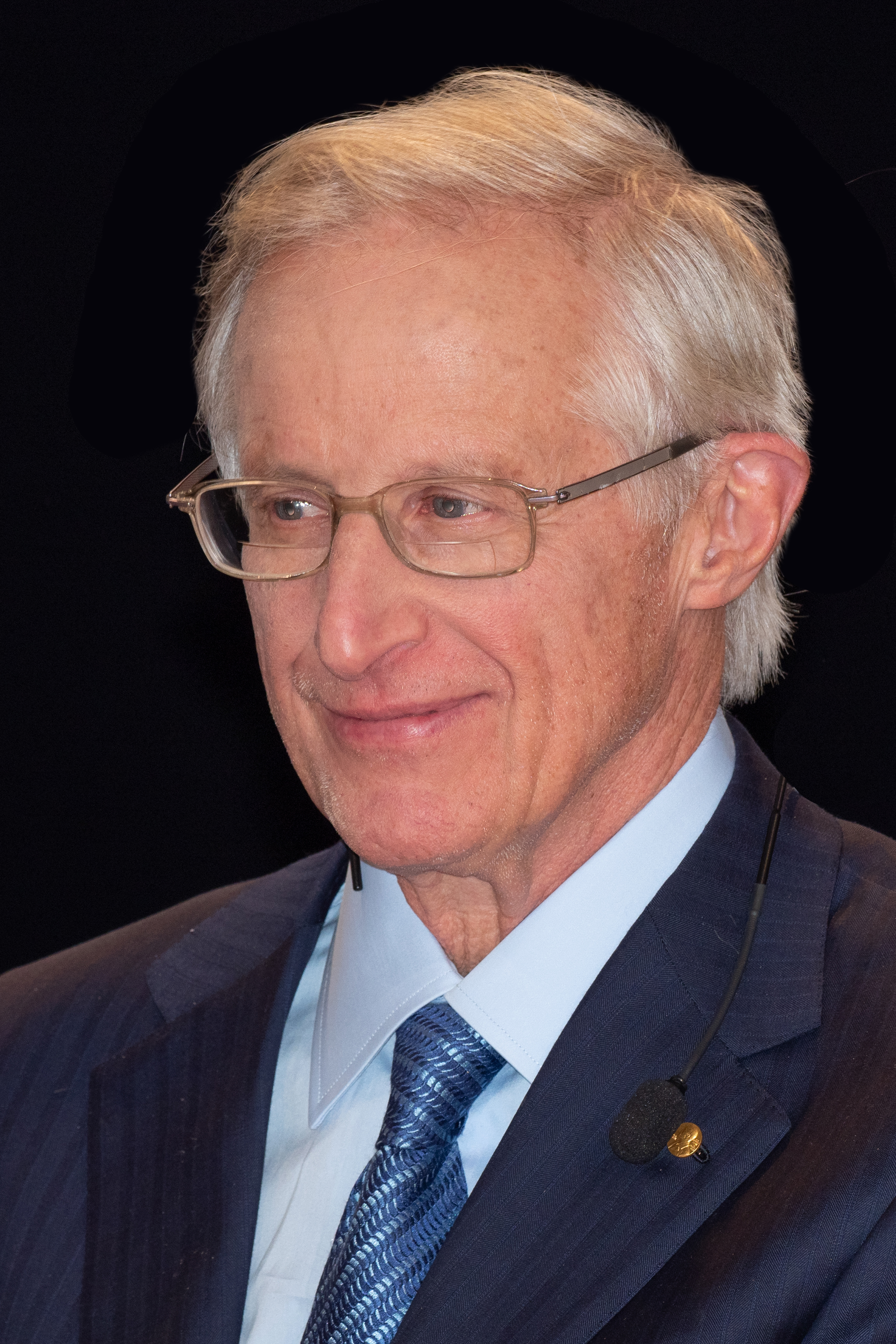
William Nordhaus

- May 5 – Tommy Helms, American baseball player and manager (d. 2025)
- May 8
  - Bill Lockyer, American academic and politician, 30th Attorney General of California
  - James Mitchum, American actor (d. 2025)
  - James Traficant, American lawyer and politician (d. 2014)
- May 9 – Howard Komives, American professional basketball player (d. 2009)
- May 10 – Taurean Blacque, American television and stage actor (d. 2022)
- May 13 – Ritchie Valens, Mexican American singer-songwriter and guitarist (d. 1959)
- May 16 – Peter Nicholas, American businessman and philanthropist (d. 2022)
- May 17 – Ben Nelson, American politician
- May 19
  - Peter C. Bjarkman, American baseball historian, author (d. 2018)
  - Bobby Burgess, American dancer, singer
  - Nora Ephron, American novelist and screenwriter (d. 2012)
- May 21 – Bobby Cox, American baseball manager (d. 2026)
- May 23
  - General Johnson, American singer-songwriter and producer (d. 2010)
  - Martin Puryear, American sculptor
- May 24 – Bob Dylan, American poet, musician and recipient of the Nobel Prize in Literature
- May 26 – Aldrich Ames, American CIA analyst and KGB agent (d. 2026)
- May 27 – Ira Berlin, American historian (d. 2018)
- May 31
  - Louis Ignarro, American pharmacologist, recipient of the Nobel Prize in Physiology or Medicine
  - William Nordhaus, American economist, recipient of the Nobel Memorial Prize in Economic Sciences (d. 2026)

=== June ===
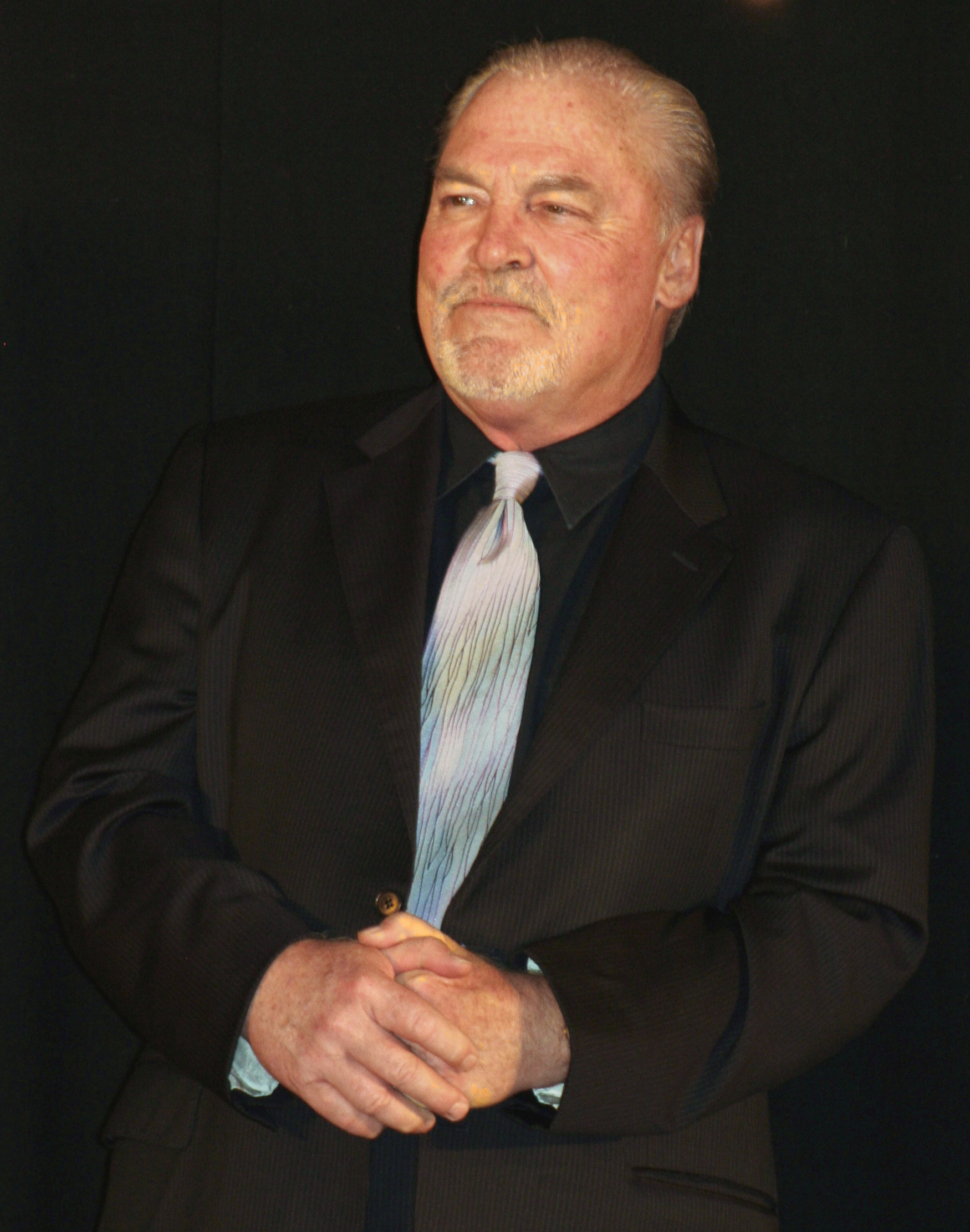
Stacy Keach

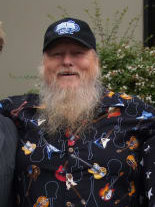
Mickey Jones

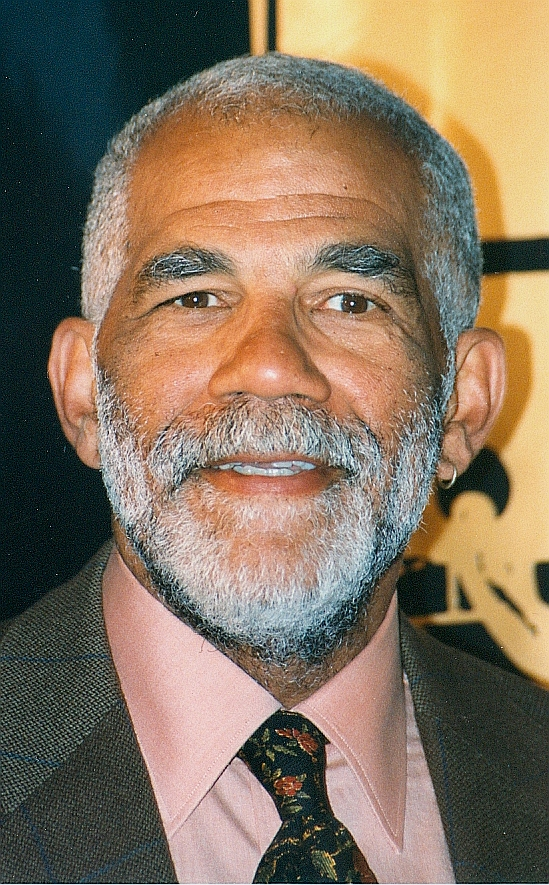
Ed Bradley

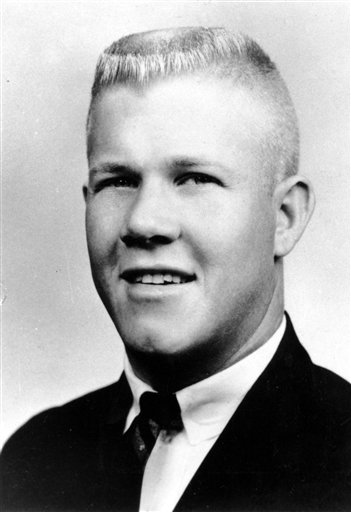
Charles Whitman

- June 2 – Stacy Keach, American actor
- June 5
  - Spalding Gray, American actor, screenwriter (d. 2004)
  - Robert Kraft, American businessman
- June 8 – Fuzzy Haskins, American musician
- June 10 – Mickey Jones, American rock drummer and actor (d. 2018)
- June 12
  - Marv Albert, American sports announcer
  - Chick Corea, American jazz pianist (d. 2021)
- June 14 – John Edgar Wideman, African-American novelist, author and professor
- June 15
  - Neal Adams, American comic book artist (d. 2022)
  - Harry Nilsson, American musician (d. 1994)
- June 16 – Lamont Dozier, American songwriter (d. 2022)
- June 21
  - Mitty Collier, American church pastor, gospel singer and former rhythm and blues singer
  - Joe Flaherty, American-Canadian actor, comedian (Second City Television) (d. 2024)
  - Neal Adams, American comic book artist (d. 2022)
  - Jimmy Rayl, American professional basketball player (d. 2019)
- June 22
  - Ed Bradley, African-American journalist (60 Minutes) (d. 2006)
  - Howard Kindig, American football player
  - Michael Lerner, American actor (d. 2023)
- June 24
  - Bill Reardon, American politician, educator
  - Charles Whitman, American mass murderer (d. 1966)
- June 25
  - Miles Feinstein, American criminal law defense attorney, legal commentator (d. 2023)
  - Mike Stoker, American firefighter, engineer and captain
- June 26 – Nick Macarchuk, American basketball head coach
- June 27
  - Jerry Allen, American football player
  - Mike Honda, American politician and educator
- June 28
  - Len Boehmer, American Major League Baseball player
  - Joseph Goguen, American computer scientist (d. 2006)
- June 29
  - John Boccabella, American professional baseball player
  - David A. Bramlett, United States Army four-star general
  - Larry Stahl, American baseball player

=== July ===
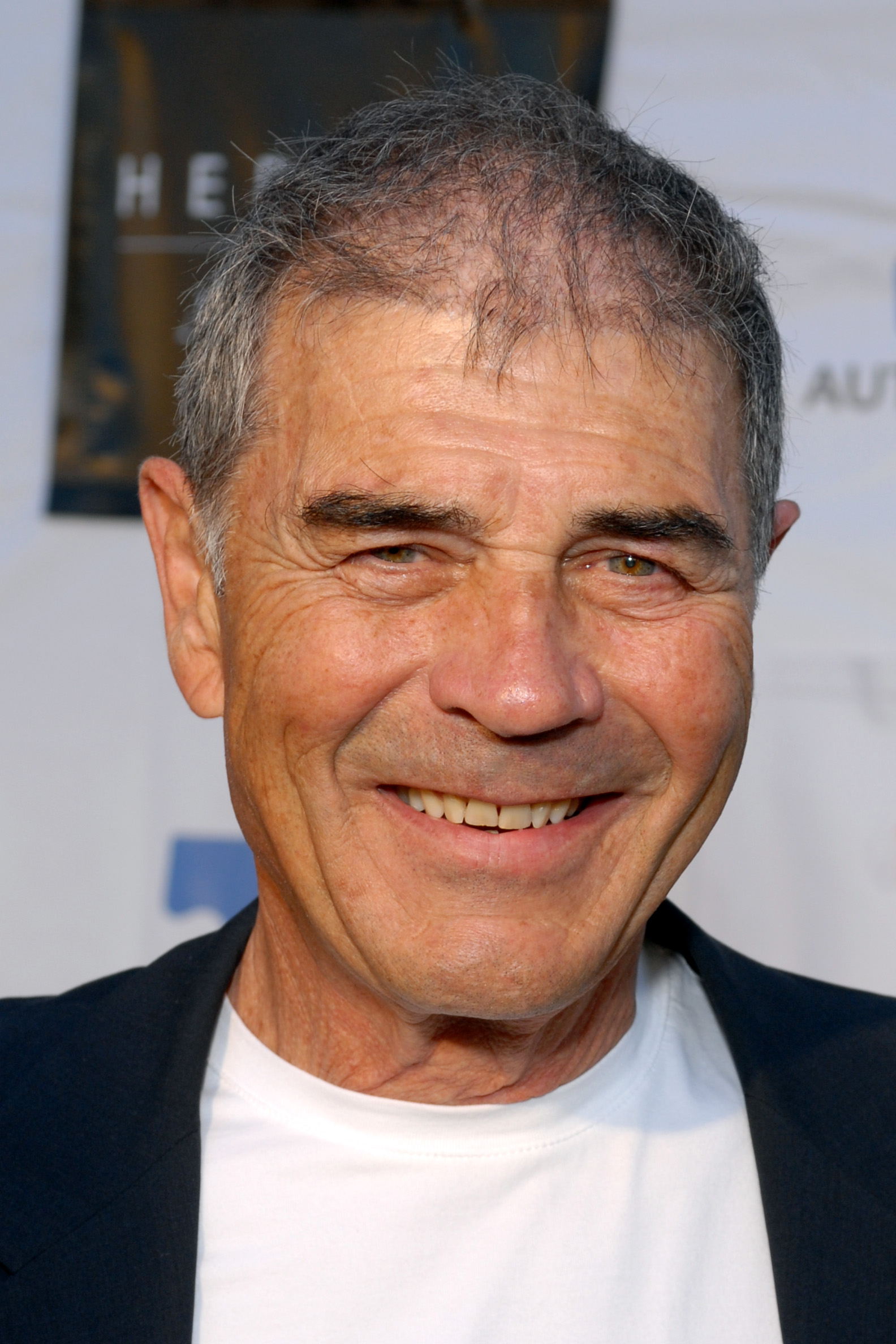
Robert Forster

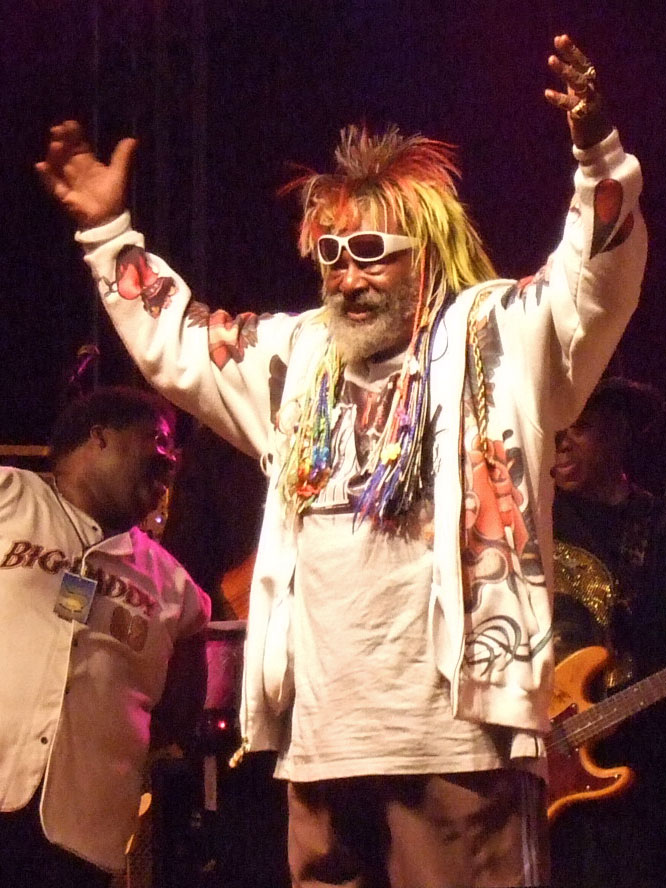
George Clinton

- July 2 – Chris Noel, American actress
- July 3
  - Gloria Allred, American lawyer
  - Casey Cox, American baseball player (d. 2023)
- July 4
  - Jay Carty, American basketball player (d. 2017)
  - Digger Phelps, American former college basketball coach
- July 5
  - Terry Cashman, American singer-songwriter and record producer
  - Peggy Miley, American actress, writer
- July 6
  - John DeCamp, American politician (d. 2017)
  - Steve McMillan, American politician (d. 2022)
  - Randall Robinson, African-American lawyer, author and activist (d. 2023)
  - Harold Leighton Weller, American conductor
- July 7 – Louis Friedman, American astronautics engineer, space spokesperson
- July 8
  - Thunderbolt Patterson, American professional wrestler
  - Ken Sanders, American Major League Baseball relief pitcher
- July 9 – Tom Black, American professional basketball player (d. 2017)
- July 10 – Robert Pine, American actor
- July 13 – Robert Forster, American actor (d. 2019)
- July 14 – Maulana Karenga, African-American author, activist; founder of Kwanzaa
- July 16
  - Ken Herock, American college, professional football player
  - Lloyd Sisco, American football coach
- July 17 – Marina Oswald Porter, Russian-born widow of JFK assassin Lee Harvey Oswald
- July 18
  - Bill Delahunt, lawyer and politician (d. 2024)
  - Marcia Jones-Smoke, American sprint canoer
  - Lonnie Mack, American singer, guitarist (d. 2016)
- July 21 – Gary Waslewski, American baseball player
- July 22
  - George Clinton, African-American musician
  - Rich Jackson, American football player
  - Susie Berning, American professional golfer (d. 2024)
- July 25 – Emmett Till, African American victim of lynching (d. 1955)
- July 26 – Darlene Love, African-American singer, actress
- July 28 – Michael Mukasey, American politician and lawyer, 81st United States Attorney General
- July 29 – Jennifer Dunn, American politician (d. 2007)

=== August ===
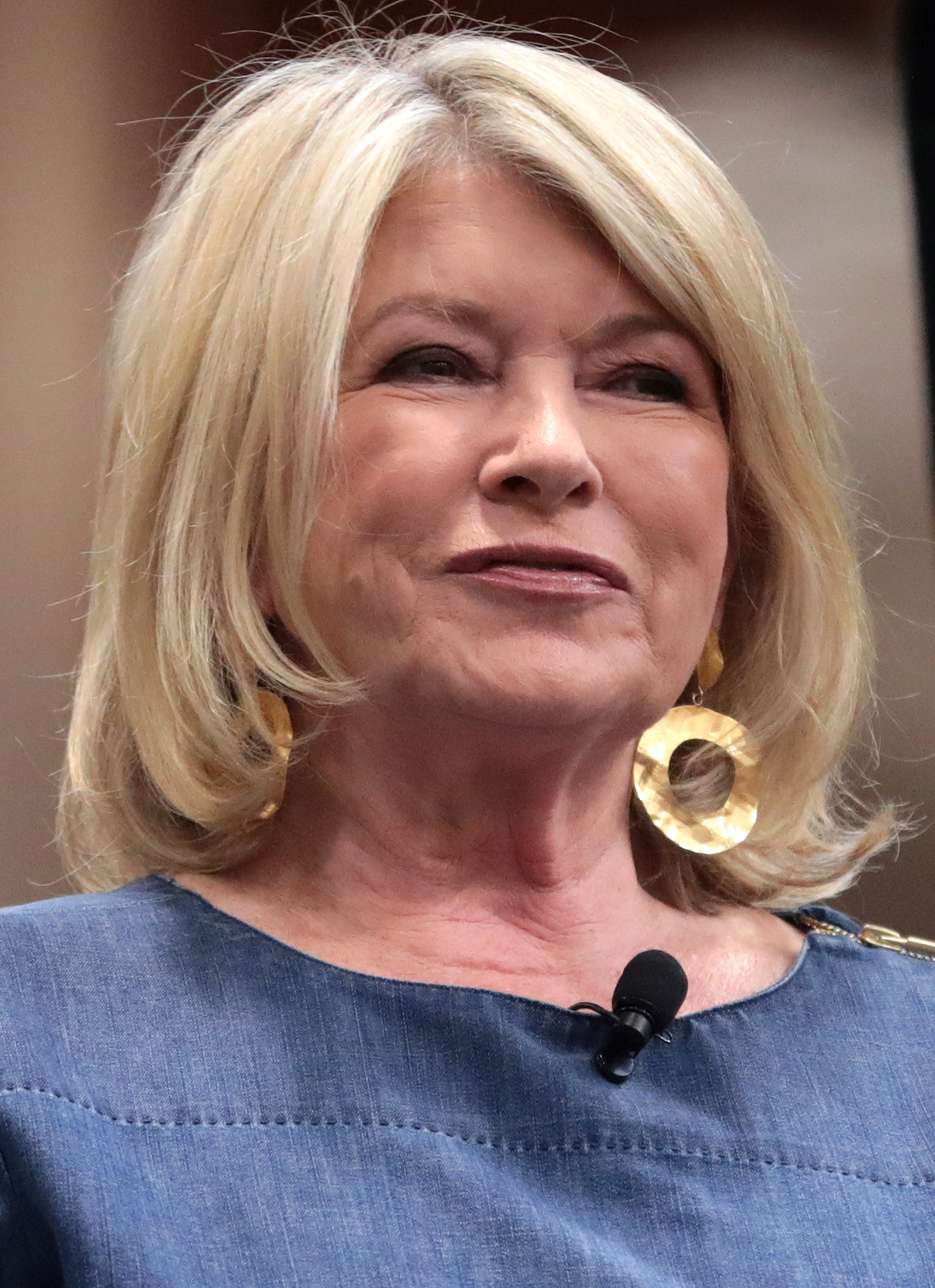
Martha Stewart

- August 3
  - Martha Stewart, American television personality and media entrepreneur
  - Robert Thurman, American Buddhist historian and author (d. 2026)
- August 4
  - Paul Mooney, American comedian (d. 2021)
  - Ted Strickland, American politician
- August 5 – Gil Garcetti, American politician
- August 6 – Lyle Berman, American poker player
- August 8
  - Earl Boen, American actor (d. 2023)
  - George Tiller, American physician (d. 2009)
- August 9 – Shirlee Busbee, American novelist
- August 10 – Joel Belz, American publisher (d. 2024)
- August 12
  - Edwin Feulner, American political scientist and think tank founder (d. 2025)
  - Deborah Walley, actress (d. 2001)
- August 14
  - Lynne Cheney, American author and scholar, Second Lady of the United States as wife of Dick Cheney
  - David Crosby, American folk rock guitarist and singer-songwriter (d. 2023)
  - Connie Smith, born Constance Meador, country singer
- August 20 – Joyce Pensato, American painter (d. 2019)
- August 21 – Jackie DeShannon, American singer-songwriter (What the World Needs Now)
- August 26 – Barbara Ehrenreich, American writer and political activist (d. 2022)
- August 28 – Paul Plishka, American operatic bass (d. 2025)

=== September ===
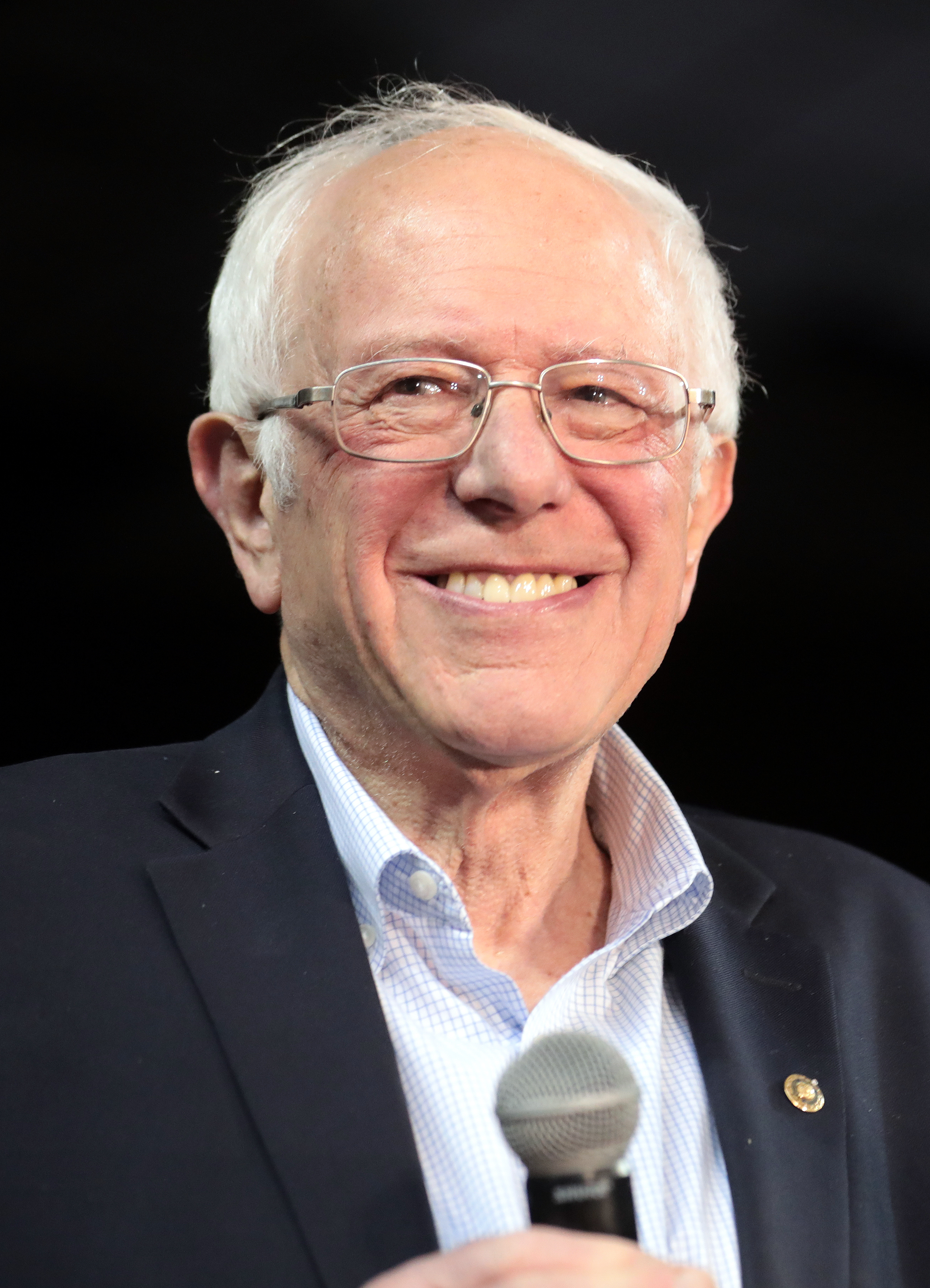
Bernie Sanders

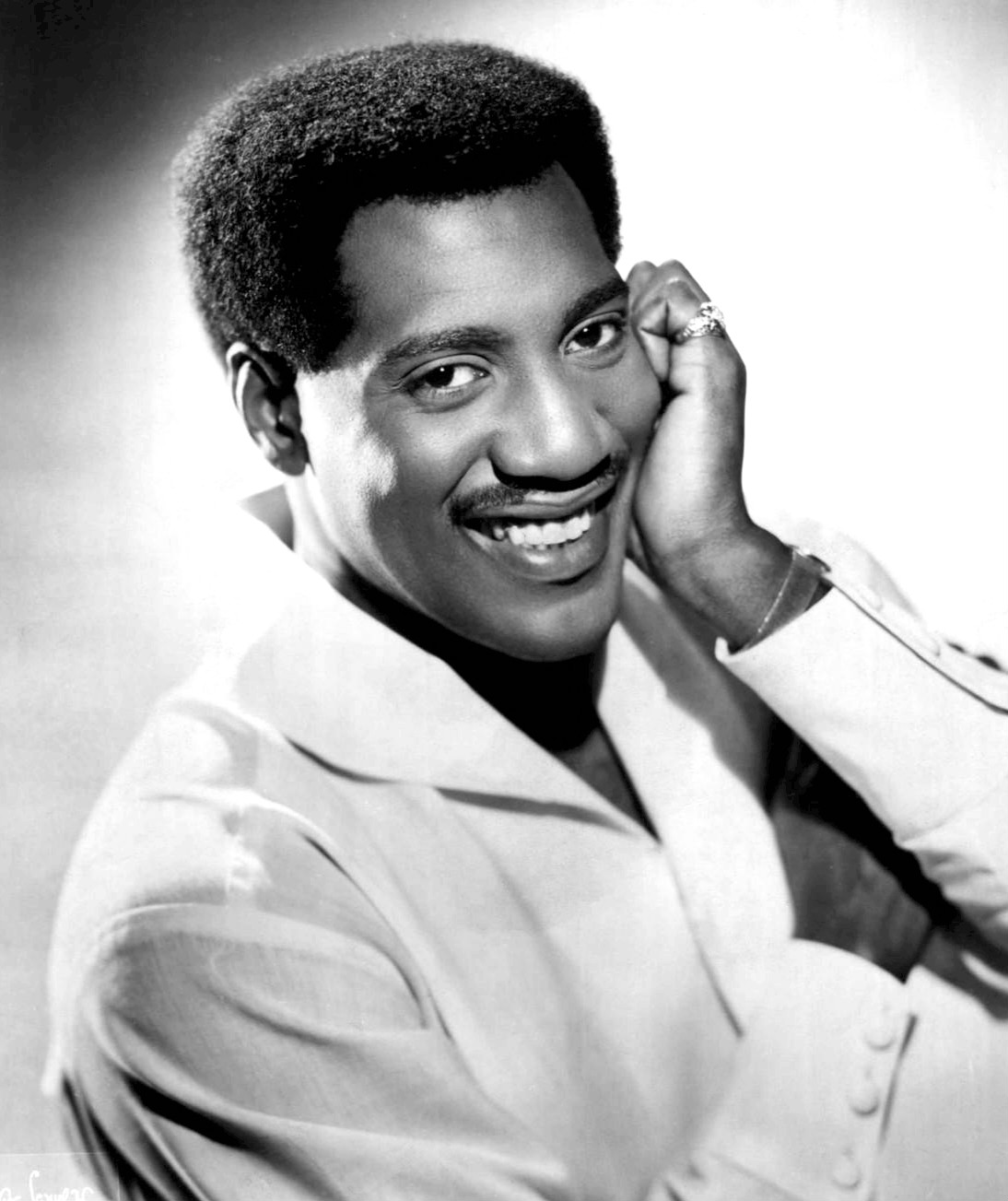
Otis Redding

- September 2 – John Thompson, American basketball coach (d. 2020)
- September 3 – Dave Herman, American football player (d. 2022)
- September 6 – Danny Davis, African-American politician
- September 8 – Bernie Sanders, American politician
- September 9
  - Otis Redding, African-American singer, musician (d. 1967)
  - Dennis Ritchie, American computer scientist (d. 2011)
- September 10 – Stephen Jay Gould, American paleontologist and evolutionist (d. 2002)
- September 15 – Signe Toly Anderson, American singer (d. 2016)
- September 17 – Bob Matsui, American politician (d. 2005)
- September 18 – Priscilla Mitchell, American country music singer (d. 2014)
- September 19 – Cass Elliot, American singer (The Mamas & the Papas) (d. 1974)
- September 20 – Dale Chihuly, American glass sculptor
- September 21 – R. James Woolsey Jr., American lawyer and diplomat
- September 22 – Jeremiah Wright, pastor
- September 23 – George Jackson, American author (d. 1971)
- September 24
  - Guy Hovis, American singer
  - Linda McCartney, American activist, musician and photographer (d. 1998)
  - Lynne Taetzsch, American painter and writer
- September 27
  - Joel Shapiro, American sculptor (d. 2025)
  - Sam Zell, American publisher, investor (d. 2023)
- September 28 – Charley Taylor, American football player (d. 2022)

=== October ===
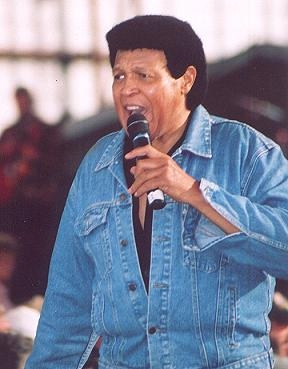
Chubby Checker

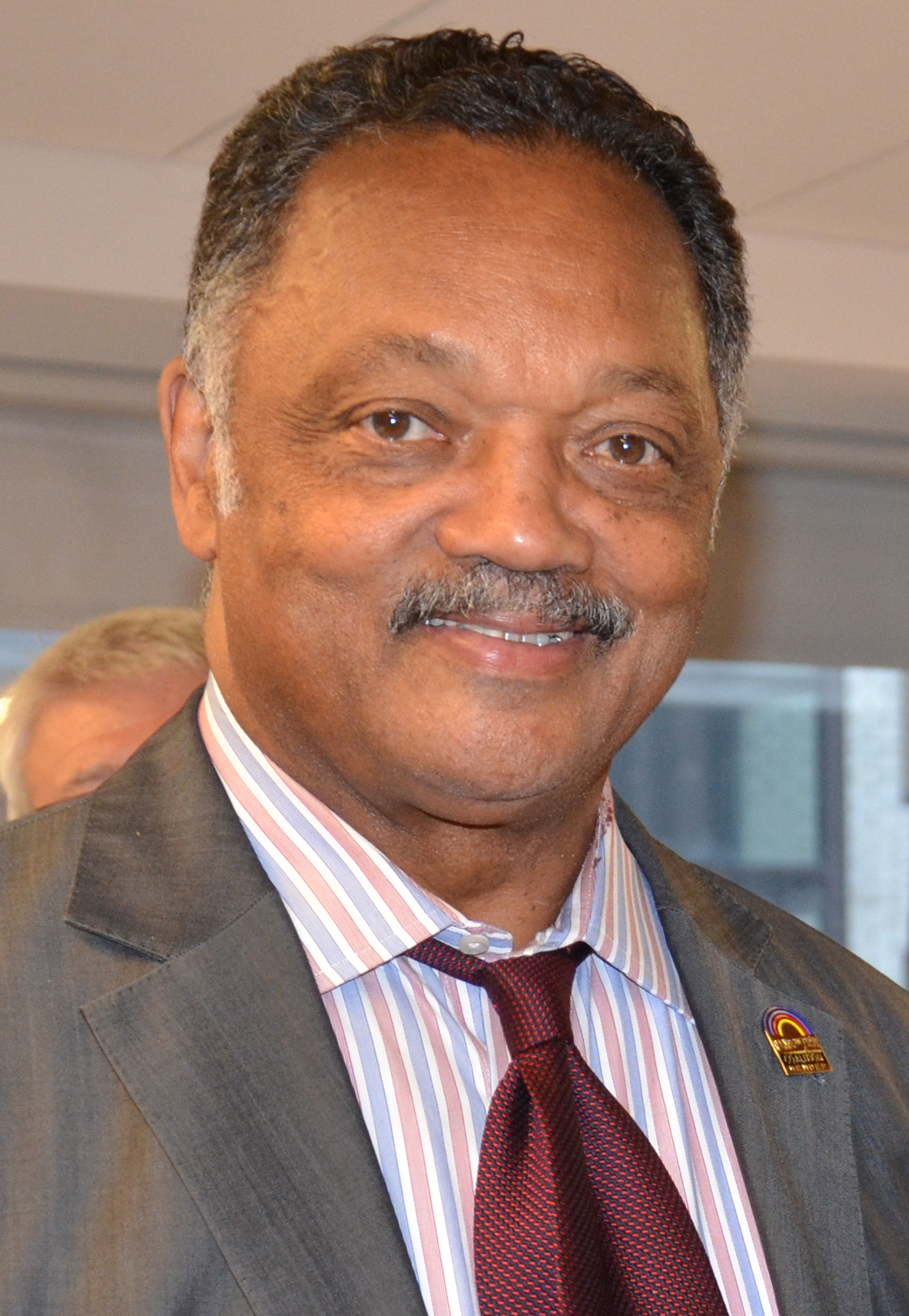
Jesse Jackson

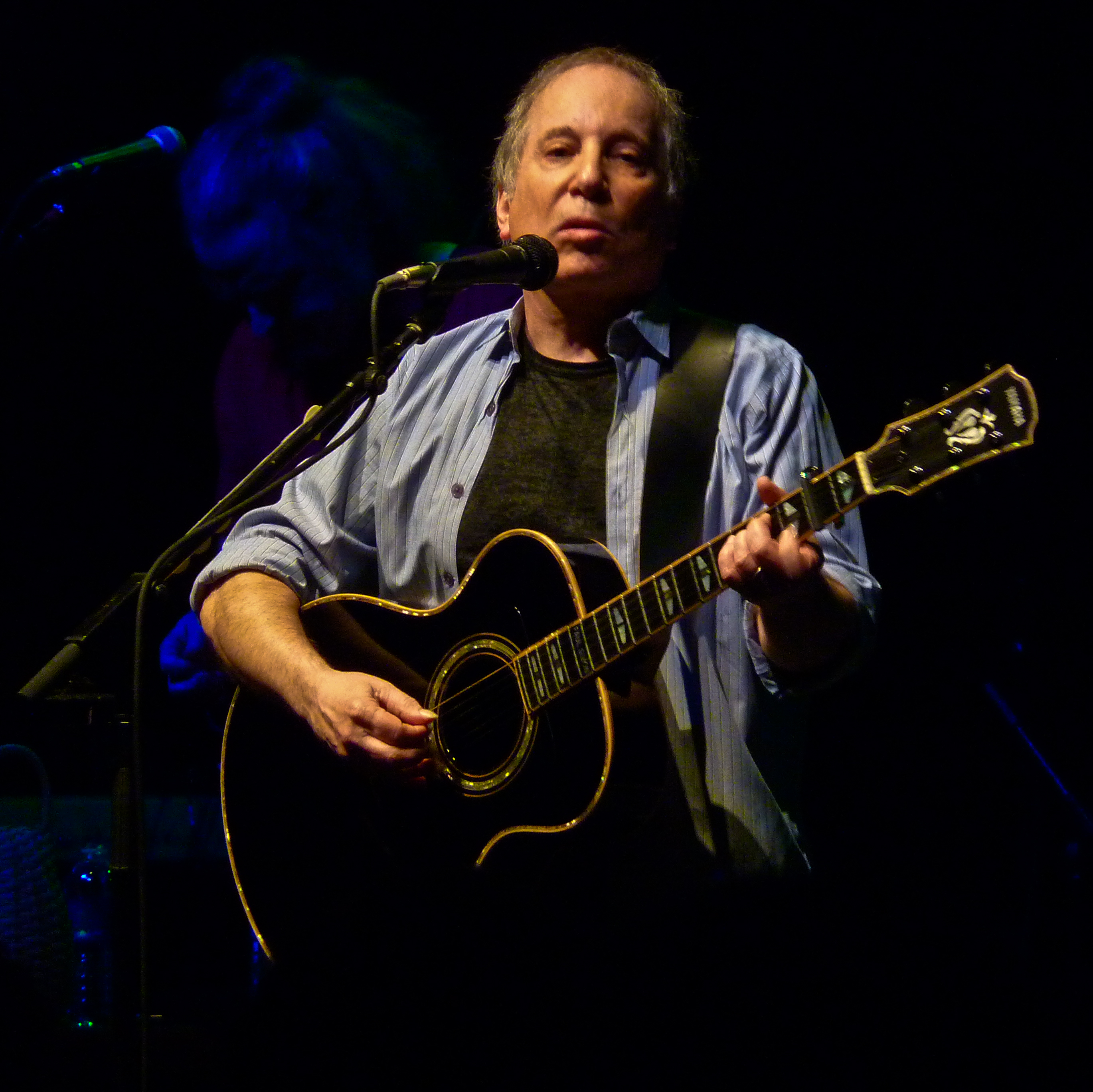
Paul Simon

- October 2 – John Sinclair, American poet (d. 2024)
- October 3 – Chubby Checker, African-American rhythm and blues singer
- October 4
  - Roy Blount Jr., American writer and comedian
  - Elizabeth Eckford, American activist
  - Anne Rice, American writer of vampire fiction (d. 2021)
- October 5 – Roy Book Binder, American singer-songwriter and guitarist
- October 8 – Jesse Jackson, African-American clergyman and civil rights activist (d. 2026)
- October 9 – Trent Lott, American politician
- October 10 – Peter Coyote, American actor, author, director, screenwriter and narrator of films, theatre, television and audio books
- October 13
  - Jim Price, baseball player and sportscaster (d. 2023)
  - Paul Simon, American singer-songwriter
- October 16 – Tim McCarver, baseball player and sportscaster (d. 2023)
- October 17 – Earl Thomas Conley, country music singer (d. 2019)
- October 21 – Steve Cropper, guitarist, songwriter, and record producer (d. 2025)
- October 22 – Wilbur Wood, baseball pitcher (d. 2026)
- October 23 – Mel Winkler, actor (d. 2020)
- October 25 – Anne Tyler, novelist
- October 27
  - Len St. Jean, American football player (d. 2025)
  - Dick Trickle, race car driver (d. 2013)
- October 30 – Otis Williams, singer
- October 31 – Sally Kirkland, actress (d. 2025)

=== November ===
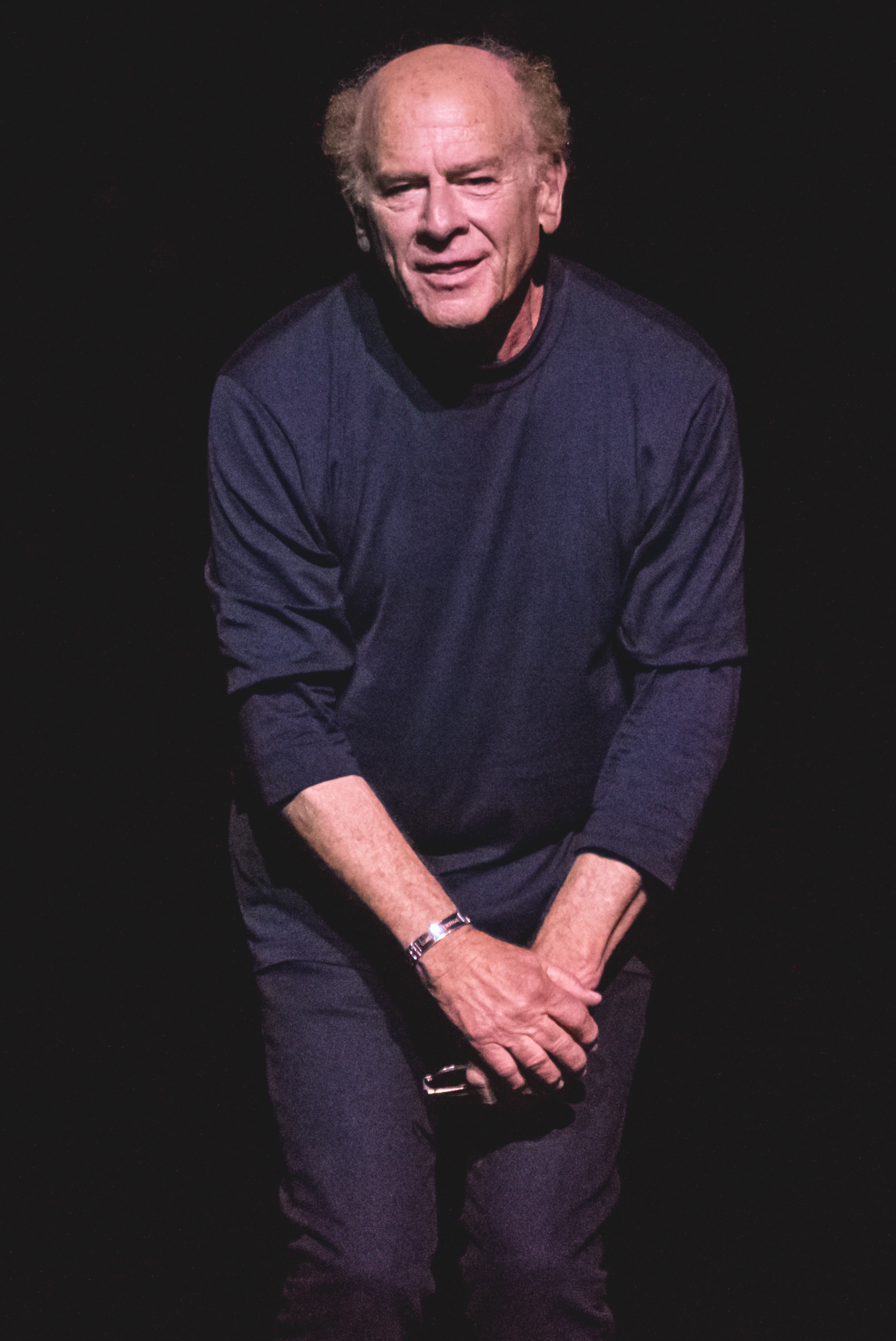
Art Garfunkel

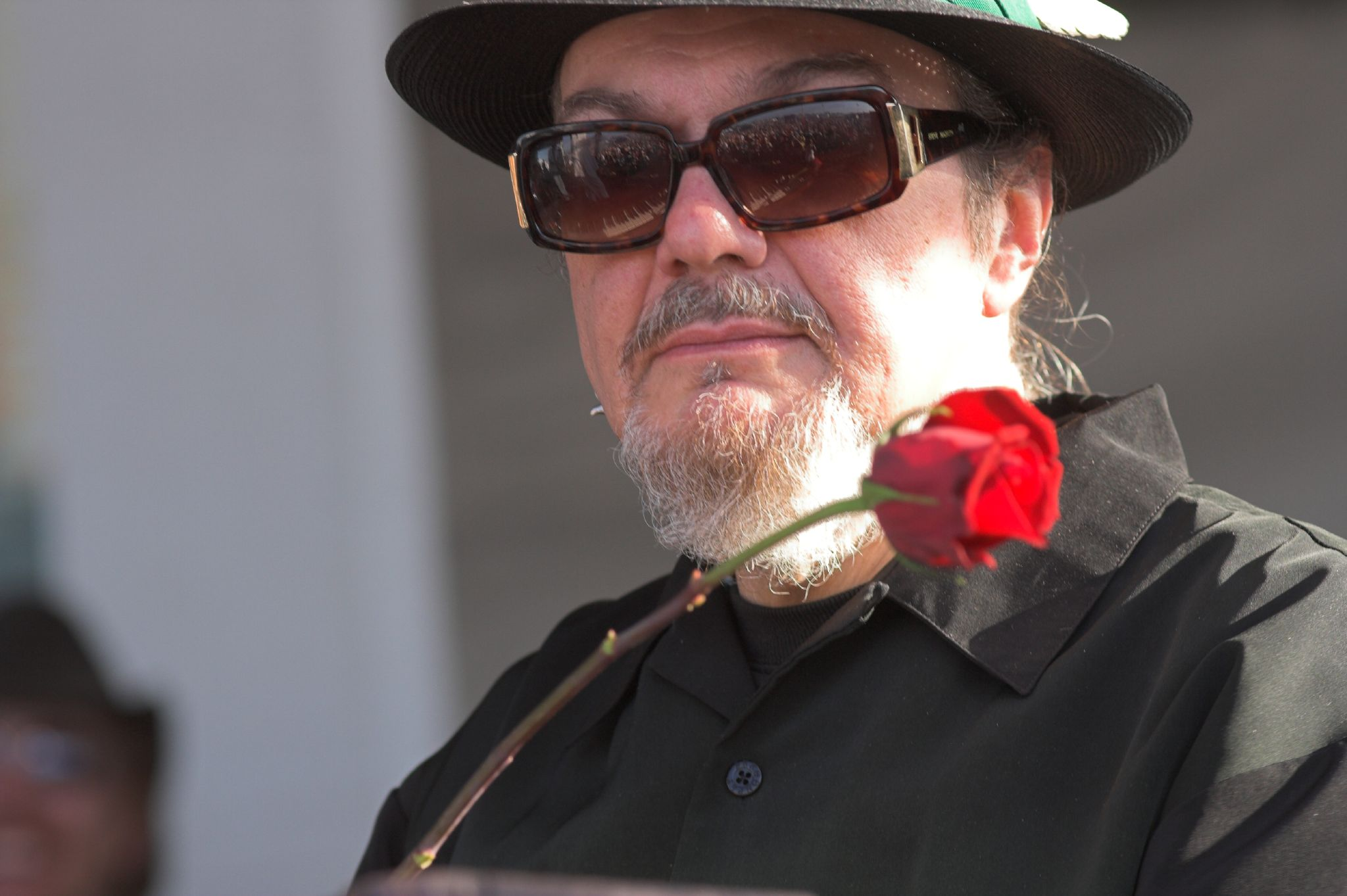
Dr. John

- November 1 – Robert Foxworth, actor
- November 5 – Art Garfunkel, singer
- November 6
  - Guy Clark, singer, songwriter (d. 2016)
  - Ray Perkins, American football player and coach (d. 2020)
  - Doug Sahm, roots rock musician (d. 1999)
- November 8 – Bill Brewster, politician and pharmacist (d. 2022)
- November 9 – Tom Fogerty, guitarist (Creedence Clearwater Revival) (d. 1990)
- November 12 – Carol Gluck, historian, author, and academic
- November 13
  - Joseph L. Galloway, newspaper columnist, Vietnam War historian (d. 2021)
  - David Green, American businessman and philanthropist, founder of Hobby Lobby
  - Dack Rambo, American actor (d. 1994)
  - Mel Stottlemyre, American professional baseball player and coach (d. 2019)
- November 20
  - Dr. John, American singer-songwriter and musician (d. 2019)
  - Gary Karr, double bass player (d. 2025)
  - Oliver Sipple, American man known for intervening to prevent an assassination attempt against President Gerald Ford (d. 1989)
- November 25
  - Ralph Haben, American politician, Speaker of the Florida House of Representatives (d. 2026)
  - Mike Moore, American baseball executive (d. 2022)
- November 26 – Jeff Torborg, American baseball player and manager (d. 2025)
- November 27
  - Tom Morga, American stuntman, stunt coordinator, and actor.
  - Henry Carr, American Olympic athlete (d. 2015)
  - Eddie Rabbitt, American country musician (d. 1998)
- November 29
  - Bill Freehan, American baseball player (d. 2021)
  - Jody Miller, American country musician (d. 2022)

=== December ===
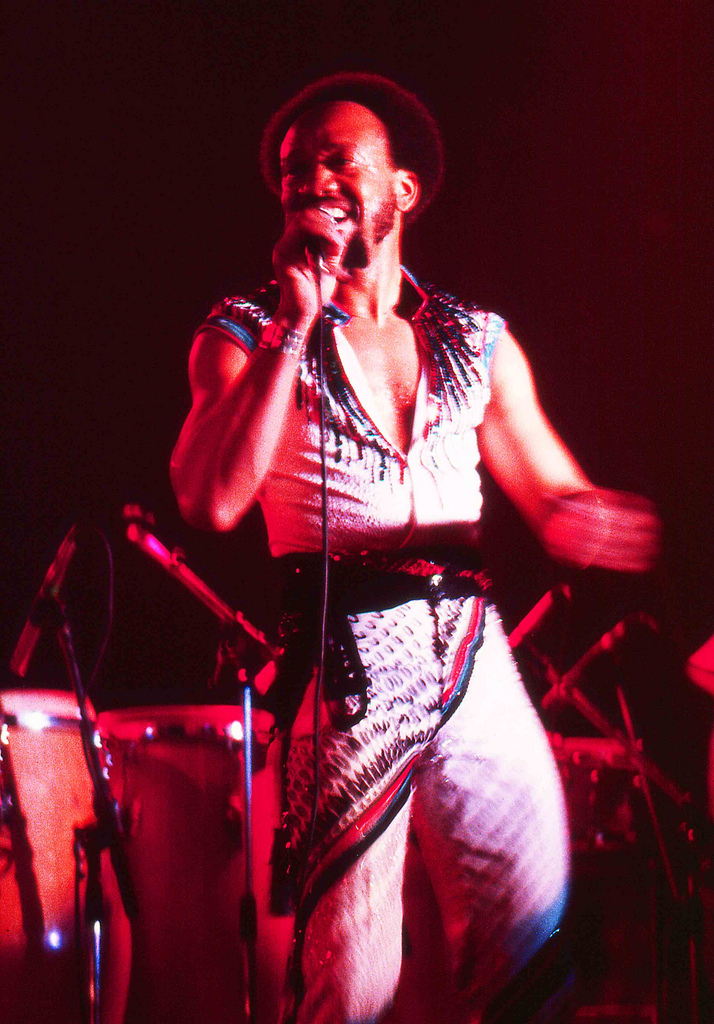
Maurice White

- December 6 – Richard Speck, American mass murderer (d. 1991)
- December 7 – Melba Pattillo Beals, American journalist and activist
- December 8
  - Ed Brinkman, American baseball player and coach (d. 2008)
  - Bob Brown, American football offensive lineman (d. 2023)
  - Duke Cunningham, American commander and politician
- December 9 – Beau Bridges, American actor
- December 10 – Susan Catania, American politician (d. 2023)
- December 11
  - Max Baucus, American politician
  - J. Frank Wilson, American rock & roll musician (d. 1991)
- December 12 – Katharine Lee Reid, American art historian and museum curator (d. 2022)
- December 13 – John Davidson, American singer and actor
- December 19 – Maurice White, African-American singer, songwriter, musician and record producer, founder of Earth, Wind & Fire (d. 2016)
- December 21 – Jared Martin, American actor (d. 2017)
- December 23
  - Ron Bushy, American rock musician (d. 2021)
  - Tim Hardin, American folk musician (d. 1980)
- December 24 – Lex Hixon, American Sufi author, poet, and spiritual teacher (d. 1995)
- December 27 – Miles Aiken, American basketball player and coach
- December 29 – Richard Dyer, American music critic (d. 2024)
- December 30 – Mel Renfro, American football player

=== Full date unknown ===
- Fred Eversley, American sculptor (d. 2025)
- Cynthia Krupat, American graphic designer

== Deaths ==
- January 2 – Charles Hanford Henderson, educator and author (b. 1861)
- January 8 – Jennie Tuttle Hobart, Second Lady of the United States as wife of Garret Hobart (b. 1849)
- January 12 – Mary Onahan Gallery, writer and editor (b. 1866)
- January 20 – Joe Penner, Hungarian-American actor (b. 1904)
- January 20 – John Bissinger, Olympic gymnast (b. 1879)
- February 2 – Harris Laning, admiral (b. 1873)
- February 9 – Aaron S. Watkins, presidential candidate (Prohibition Party) (born 1863)
- February 20 – Charles Rockwell Lanman, Sanskrit scholar (b. 1850)
- February 23 – Sister Blandina, missionary and Catholic Servant of God (b. 1850)
- February 27 – William D. Byron, Congressman (b. 1895)
- March 6 – Gutzon Borglum, artist, sculptor, creator of the Mount Rushmore National Memorial (b. 1867)
- March 8 – Sherwood Anderson, fiction writer (b. 1876)
- March 13 – Elizabeth Madox Roberts, novelist and poet (b. 1881)
- April 13 – Annie Jump Cannon, astronomer (b. 1863)
- June 2 – Lou Gehrig, American baseball player (b. 1903)
- June 11 – Daniel Carter Beard, American scouting pioneer (b. 1850)
- June 21 – Elliott Dexter, American actor (b. 1870)
- June 26 – Andrew Jackson Houston, American politician (b. 1854)
- June 28 – Richard Carle, American actor (b. 1871)
- July 10 – Jelly Roll Morton, African American jazz pianist (b. 1890)
- July 12 – Carl Jules Weyl, art director and Reichswehr soldier (born 1890 in Germany)
- July 20 – Lew Fields, American vaudeville performer (b. 1867)
- July 25 – Allan Forrest, American actor (b. 1885)
- July 26 – Benjamin Lee Whorf, linguist (b. 1897)
- July 30 – Mickey Welch, American baseball player, MLB Hall of Famer (b. 1859)
- August 30 – Anna Colwell, American politician (b. 1876)
- September 13 – Elias Disney, farmer, father of Walt Disney (born 1859)
- September 16 – Ida Lou Anderson, orator, professor and radio broadcasting pioneer (b. 1900)
- October 5 – Louis Brandeis, U.S. Supreme Court Justice (b. 1856)
- October 8 – Gus Kahn, lyricist (born 1886 in Germany)
- October 23 – Anton Marius Andersen, Lutheran minister (b. 1847)
- October 29 – Harvey Hendrick, baseball player (b. 1897)
- November 10 – Grace Ingalls, youngest sister of author Laura Ingalls Wilder (b. 1877)
- November 12 – Abe Reles, mobster (b. 1907)
- December 7 – Attack on Pearl Harbor: U.S. Navy personnel
  - Mervyn S. Bennion, captain (b. 1887)
  - Herbert C. Jones, officer (b. 1918)
  - Isaac C. Kidd, admiral (b. 1884)
  - Thomas James Reeves, radioman (b. 1895)
  - Franklin Van Valkenburgh, captain (b. 1888)
- December 25 – Blanche Bates, stage actress (b. 1873)

== See also ==
- List of American films of 1941
- Timeline of United States history (1930–1949)
- Timeline of World War II
