= Cynthia Krupat =

American graphic designer

Cynthia Krupat is an American graphic designer who has designed dozens of books for Farrar, Straus and Giroux.

In an interview with Bruce Hainley in Artforum in May 1995, Wayne Koestenbaum called Krupat "the Edith Head of book design."

In a May 1999 interview with BookPage, Maurice Sendak called Krupat "the greatest designer living," in reference to her work on Swine Lake, written by James Marshall before his death in 1992, then illustrated by Sendak, and published by HarperCollins in 1999.

Her many book designs include the fiction works, Sassafrass, Cypress, and Indigo by Ntozake Shange, The Volcano Lover by Susan Sontag, The Men's Club by Leonard Michaels; works of poetry including, Geography III by Elizabeth Bishop, and Flesh and Blood by C.K. Williams. Krupat also designed the cover for Jane Grigson's The Mushroom Feast.
