= Lynne Taetzsch =

American abstract painter and writer

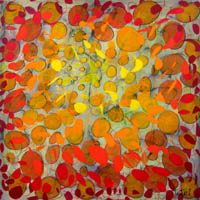
Culmination by Lynne Taetzsch

Lynne Taetzsch (born September 24, 1941, East Orange, New Jersey) is an abstract painter and writer working out of her studio in Ithaca, New York, since 2000. She studied fine art at Cooper Union for the Advancement of Science and Art (1961–63), the University of Southern California (1959–60) and the University of California (1966). She received a B.A. in English from Rutgers University in 1971, an MA in creative writing from San Diego State University in 1988, and a PhD in creative writing from Florida State University in 1992.

Taetzsch has exhibited her work in solo and group exhibits throughout the US and participated in a group show at the Cosmopolitan Art Association in Seoul, So. Korea in 1988. Her first solo exhibit was at Paula Insel Gallery in New York City in 1964. She is currently represented by Monkdogz Urban Art in New York City, Boston Art, Inc. in Boston, Massachusetts, and Zingaro Gallery in Glendale, Arizona. Her work hangs in private and institutional collections worldwide.

After learning to paint and draw from life when she was a young girl, Taetzsch's art gradually became more abstract during the period when she attended Cooper Union in the early 1960s. She was inspired by the New York abstract expressionists, and with the encouragement of her painting teacher, began adding collage materials to her oil painting, describing her work at that time as "non-objective art."

Taetzsch's art appears on the covers of the Spring, 1990 issue of Sundog, the Spring, 1989 issue of Pacific Review, and in her multi-genre essay "Hang the Critic ‘and/both’ Resurrect the Author" in the Fall, 1989 issue of Central Park.

Taetzsch has published short stories and essays in a variety of literary journals, as well as 11 books with publishers such as Watson-Guptill, Faber & Faber, and Van Nostrand Reinhold. Her latest book is The Bipolar Dementia Art Chronicles, 2006 with Booklocker.Com.

== Artwork ==
"Taetzsch is a painter very much in the tradition of the best of 20th century abstraction"
-Stan Bowman, "Color Contrast", Ithaca Times, 12/12/2001, p. 14
