= Anna Colwell =

American politician

Member of the Washington House of Representatives from the 49th district
- In office 1920–1923

Personal details
- Born: 1876 Chicago, Illinois
- Died: August 30, 1941 (aged 64–65) Seattle, Washington
- Party: Republican

Anna K. Colwell (1876 – August 30, 1941) was an American politician. She was a Republican, representing District 49 in the Washington House of Representatives which included parts of Snohomish County, from 1920 to 1923.
