= 1876 in the United States =

- Decades: 1850s; 1860s; 1870s; 1880s; 1890s
- See also: History of the United States (1865–1918); Timeline of United States history (1860–1899); List of years in the United States

Events from the year 1876 in the United States.

== Incumbents ==
=== Federal government ===
- President: Ulysses S. Grant (R-Illinois)
- Vice President: vacant
- Chief Justice: Morrison Waite (Ohio)
- Speaker of the House of Representatives:

Michael C. Kerr (D-Indiana) (until August 19)
Samuel J. Randall (D-Pennsylvania) (starting December 4)

- Congress: 44th

==== State governments ====
Governors and lieutenant governors

=== Governors ===
- Governor of Alabama: George S. Houston (Democratic)
- Governor of Arkansas: Augustus Hill Garland (Democratic)
- Governor of California: William Irwin (Democratic)
- Governor of Colorado: John Long Routt (Republican) (starting August 1)
- Governor of Connecticut: Charles R. Ingersoll (Democratic)
- Governor of Delaware: John P. Cochran (Democratic)
- Governor of Florida: Marcellus Stearns (Republican)
- Governor of Georgia: James M. Smith (Democratic)
- Governor of Illinois: John Lourie Beveridge (Republican)
- Governor of Indiana: Thomas A. Hendricks (Democratic)
- Governor of Iowa: Cyrus C. Carpenter (Republican) (until January 13), Samuel J. Kirkwood (Republican) (starting January 13)
- Governor of Kansas: Thomas A. Osborn (Republican)
- Governor of Kentucky: James B. McCreary (Democratic)
- Governor of Louisiana: William Pitt Kellogg (Republican)
- Governor of Maine: Nelson Dingley, Jr. (Republican) (until January 5), Seldon Connor (Republican Party) (starting January 5)
- Governor of Maryland: James B. Groome (Democratic) (until January 12), John Lee Carroll (Democratic) (starting January 12)
- Governor of Massachusetts: William Gaston (Democratic) (until January 6), Alexander H. Rice (Republican) (starting January 6)
- Governor of Michigan: John J. Bagley (Republican)
- Governor of Minnesota: Cushman K. Davis (Republican) (until January 7), John S. Pillsbury (Republican) (starting January 7)
- Governor of Mississippi: Adelbert Ames (Republican) (until March 29), John M. Stone (Democratic) (starting March 29)
- Governor of Missouri: Charles Henry Hardin (Democratic)
- Governor of Nebraska: Silas Garber (Republican)
- Governor of Nevada: Lewis R. Bradley (Democratic)
- Governor of New Hampshire: Person C. Cheney (Republican)
- Governor of New Jersey: Joseph D. Bedle (Democratic)
- Governor of New York: Samuel J. Tilden (Democratic) (until end of December 31)
- Governor of North Carolina: Curtis Hooks Brogden (Republican)
- Governor of Ohio: William Allen (Democratic) (until January 10), Rutherford B. Hayes (Republican) (starting January 10)
- Governor of Oregon: La Fayette Grover (Democratic)
- Governor of Pennsylvania: John F. Hartranft (Republican)
- Governor of Rhode Island: Henry Lippitt (Republican)
- Governor of South Carolina: Daniel Henry Chamberlain (Republican) (until December 14), Wade Hampton III (Democratic) (starting December 14)
- Governor of Tennessee: James D. Porter (Democratic)
- Governor of Texas: Richard Coke (Democratic) (until December 21), Richard B. Hubbard (Democratic) (starting December 21)
- Governor of Vermont: Asahel Peck (Republican) (until October 5), Horace Fairbanks (Republican) (starting October 5)
- Governor of Virginia: James L. Kemper (Democratic)
- Governor of West Virginia: John J. Jacob (Democratic)/(Independent)
- Governor of Wisconsin: William Robert Taylor (Democratic) (until January 3), Harrison Ludington (Republican) (starting January 3)

=== Lieutenant governors ===
- Lieutenant Governor of Alabama: Robert F. Ligon (Democratic) (until month and day unknown), vacant (starting month and day unknown)
- Lieutenant Governor of California: James A. Johnson (Democratic)
- Lieutenant Governor of Colorado: Lafayette Head (Republican) (starting August 1)
- Lieutenant Governor of Connecticut: George G. Sill (Republican)
- Lieutenant Governor of Florida: vacant
- Lieutenant Governor of Illinois: Archibald A. Glenn (Democratic)
- Lieutenant Governor of Indiana: Leonidas Sexton (Republican)
- Lieutenant Governor of Iowa: Joseph Dysart (Republican) (until January 13), Joshua G. Newbold (Republican) (starting January 13)
- Lieutenant Governor of Kansas: Melville J. Salter (Republican)
- Lieutenant Governor of Kentucky: John C. Underwood (Democratic)
- Lieutenant Governor of Louisiana: Caesar Antoine (Republican)
- Lieutenant Governor of Massachusetts: Horatio G. Knight (Republican)
- Lieutenant Governor of Michigan: Henry H. Holt (Republican)
- Lieutenant Governor of Minnesota: Alphonso Barto (Republican) (until January 7), James Wakefield (Republican) (starting January 7)
- Lieutenant Governor of Mississippi: Alexander K. Davis (Republican) (until month and day unknown), John M. Stone (Democratic) (starting month and day unknown)
- Lieutenant Governor of Missouri: Norman Jay Coleman (Democratic)
- Lieutenant Governor of Nevada: Jewett W. Adams (Democratic)
- Lieutenant Governor of New York: William Dorsheimer (Democratic)
- Lieutenant Governor of North Carolina: vacant
- Lieutenant Governor of Ohio: Alphonso Hart (Republican) (until January 10), Thomas Lowry Young (Republican) (starting January 10)
- Lieutenant Governor of Pennsylvania: John Latta (Democratic)
- Lieutenant Governor of Rhode Island: Henry Tillinghast Sisson (political party unknown)
- Lieutenant Governor of South Carolina: Richard Howell Gleaves (Republican) (until December 14), William Dunlap Simpson (Democratic) (starting December 14)
- Lieutenant Governor of Tennessee: Thomas H. Paine (Democratic)
- Lieutenant Governor of Texas: Richard B. Hubbard (Democratic) (until December 21), vacant (starting December 21)
- Lieutenant Governor of Vermont: Lyman G. Hinckley (Republican) (until October 5), Redfield Proctor (Republican) (starting October 5)
- Lieutenant Governor of Virginia: Henry Wirtz Thomas (Republican)
- Lieutenant Governor of Wisconsin: Charles D. Parker (Democratic)

== Events ==
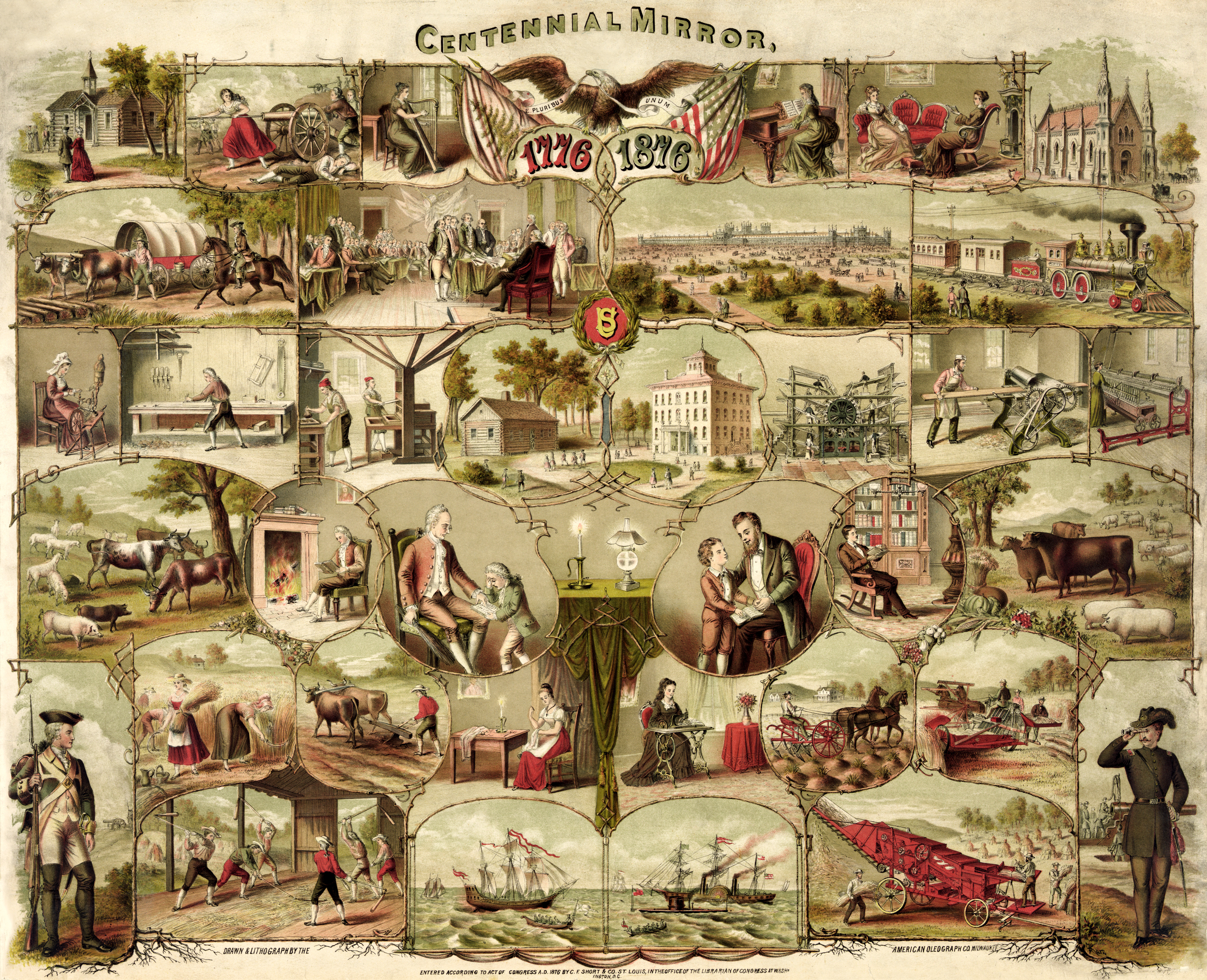
"Centennial Mirror", showing events from 1776 (left) compared with similar events in 1876 (right)

=== January–March ===
- January 27 – Northampton Bank robbery.
- February 2 – The National League of Professional Base Ball Clubs is formed at a meeting in Chicago, Illinois; it replaces the National Association of Professional Base Ball Players. Morgan Bulkeley of the Hartford Dark Blues is selected as the league's first president.
- February 22 – Johns Hopkins University is founded in Baltimore, Maryland.
- February/March – The Harvard Lampoon humor magazine is founded in Cambridge, Massachusetts.
- March – Librarian Melvil Dewey first publishes the Dewey Decimal Classification system.
- March 2 – Secretary of War William W. Belknap resigns his office in the wake of the trader post scandal.
- March 3 – Kentucky meat shower.
- March 7 – Alexander Graham Bell is granted a patent for an invention he calls the telephone.
- March 10 – Alexander Graham Bell makes the first successful telephone call by saying "Mr. Watson, come here, I want to see you.."

=== April–June ===
- April 17 – Friends Academy is founded by Gideon Frost at Locust Valley, New York.
- May 10 – The Centennial Exposition begins in Philadelphia, Pennsylvania.
- May 18 – Wyatt Earp starts work in Dodge City, Kansas, serving under Marshal Larry Deger.
- May 29 – Senate votes 37 to 29 that Secretary of War William W. Belknap cannot be barred from trial and impeachment, despite being a private citizen; however, this is far short of the two-thirds majority required and thus he is acquitted.
- June 4 – The Transcontinental Express arrives in San Francisco, California via the First Transcontinental Railroad, 83 hours and 39 minutes after having left New York City.
- June 11 – Rutherford B. Hayes selected by the Republicans as presidential candidate.
- June 17 – Indian Wars: Battle of the Rosebud – 1,500 Sioux and Cheyenne led by Crazy Horse beat back General George Crook's forces at Rosebud Creek in Montana Territory.
- June 25 – Indian Wars: Battle of the Little Bighorn – an army under Lieutenant Colonel George Armstrong Custer is defeated by 1,500-2,500 Lakota, Cheyenne and Arapaho led by Sitting Bull and Crazy Horse, suffering over 300 casualties.
- June 27 – Samuel J. Tilden selected by the Democrats as presidential candidate.

=== July–September ===
- July 4 – The United States centennial is celebrated.
- August 1
  - Colorado is admitted as the 38th U.S. state (see History of Colorado).
  - Senate votes to acquit former Secretary of War William W. Belknap of all impeached charges relating to the trader post scandal.
- August 2 – Wild Bill Hickok is shot dead during a poker game in Deadwood, Dakota.
- August 7 – George S. Houston is reelected the 24th governor of Alabama defeating Noadiah Woodruff.
- August 8 – Thomas Edison receives a patent for his mimeograph.
- September 6 – Southern Pacific line from Los Angeles to San Francisco completed.
- September 7 – In Northfield, Minnesota, Jesse James and the James-Younger Gang attempt to rob the town's bank but are surrounded by an angry mob and are nearly wiped out.

=== October–December ===
- October 4 – Texas A&M University opens for classes.
- October 6 – American Library Association founded in Philadelphia.
- November 7
  - The 1876 presidential election ends indecisively with 184 Electoral College votes for Samuel J. Tilden, 165 for Rutherford B. Hayes, and 20 in dispute. The new president (Hayes) is not decided until 1877.
  - A failed grave robbery of the Lincoln Tomb takes place this night.
- November 10 – The Centennial Exposition ends in Philadelphia, Pennsylvania.
- November 23 – Corrupt Tammany Hall leader William Marcy Tweed (better known as Boss Tweed) is delivered to authorities in New York City after being captured in Spain.
- November 25 – Indian Wars: In retaliation for the dramatic American defeat at the Battle of the Little Bighorn, United States Army troops under General Ranald S. Mackenzie sack Chief Dull Knife's sleeping Cheyenne village at the headwaters of the Powder River. The soldiers destroy all of the villagers' winter food and clothing, and then slash their ponies' throats.
- December – The first American edition of Mark Twain's The Adventures of Tom Sawyer, his first individual extended work of fiction, is published by the American Publishing Company; a British edition has appeared in early June in London with the first review appearing on June 24 in a British magazine.
- December 5 – The Brooklyn Theater Fire kills at least 278, possibly more than 300.
- December 6 – The first cremation in the U.S. takes place in a crematory built by Francis Julius LeMoyne.
- December 29 – Ashtabula River railroad disaster: collapse of a bridge over the Ashtabula River near Ashtabula, Ohio kills 92 and injures 64, the worst U.S. railroad accident until 1918.

=== Undated ===
- Emile Berliner invents an improved form of microphone which will be adopted for Alexander Graham Bell's telephone.
- Meharry Medical College is founded in Nashville, Tennessee, as the Medical Department of Central Tennessee College; it is the first medical school for African Americans in the South.
- Lyford House, by Richardson Bay, Tiburon, California is constructed.
- Heinz Tomato Ketchup introduced.
- Adolphus Busch's brewery, Anheuser-Busch in St. Louis, Missouri, first markets Budweiser, a pale lager, as a nationally sold beer.
- Melville Reuben Bissell files a patent for an improved carpet sweeper.
- First carousel at Coney Island built by Charles I. D. Looff.
- Spring – Vast numbers of Indians move north to an encampment of the Sioux chief Sitting Bull in the region of the Little Bighorn River, creating the last great gathering of native peoples on the Great Plains.

=== Ongoing ===
- Reconstruction era (1865–1877)
- Gilded Age (1869–c. 1896)
- Depression of 1873–79 (1873–1879)

== Sport ==
- September 26 - Chicago White Stockings win the First National League of Professional Base Ball Clubs Championship
- December 9 - Yale win College Football National Championship

== Births ==
- January 12
  - Jack London, born John Griffith Chaney, author (died 1916)
  - W. H. Twining, Speaker of the Colorado House of Representatives (d. 1946)
- January 23 – Bess Houdini, stage assistant and wife of Harry Houdini (died 1943)
- February 4 – Sarah Norcliffe Cleghorn, poet and socialist (died 1959)
- February 16 – Mack Swain, actor and vaudevillian (died 1935)
- March 5 – John Flammang Schrank, attempted assassin of Theodore Roosevelt (died 1943)
- March 11 – Carl Ruggles, composer (died 1971)
- March 21 – Walter Tewksbury, track athlete (died 1968)
- March 31 – William H. Dieterich, U.S. Senator from Illinois from 1933 to 1939 (died 1940)
- April 9 – Park Trammell, U.S. Senator from Florida from 1917 to 1936 (died 1936)
- April 23 – Mary Ellicott Arnold, social activist (died 1968)
- June 5 – Tony Jackson, jazz pianist (died 1920)
- July 12 – Alphaeus Philemon Cole, portrait painter (died 1988)
- August 8 – Pat McCarran, Democratic United States Senator from Nevada from 1933 until 1954 (died 1954)
- August 18 – George B. Martin, U.S. Senator from Kentucky from 1918 to 1919 (died 1945)
- September 13 – Sherwood Anderson, novelist (died 1941)
- September 16
  - Marian Cruger Coffin, landscape architect (died 1957)
  - Marvin Hart, heavyweight boxer (died 1931)
- September 26 – Edith Abbott, social worker and educator (died 1957)
- October 10 Nash; William James Bryan, U.S. Senator from Florida from 1907 to 1908 (died 1908)
- November 23 – Thomas M. Storke, U.S. Senator from California from 1938 to 1939 (died 1971)
- November 24 – Walter Burley Griffin, architect (died 1937)
- November 29 – Nellie Tayloe Ross, 14th Governor of Wyoming from 1925 to 1927 and director of the United States Mint from 1933 to 1953; first female state governor in the U.S. (died 1977)
- December 9 – Pauline Whittier, golfer (died 1946)
- December 12 – Alvin Kraenzlein, hurdler (died 1928)
- December 20 – Walter Sydney Adams, astronomer (died 1956)

=== Full date unknown ===
- Halver Halversen, traveling jewelry auctioneer and store owner (d. ?)

== Deaths ==
- January 10 – Gordon Granger, U.S. and Union Army general (born 1822)
- January 15 – Eliza McCardle Johnson, First Lady of the United States, Second Lady of the United States (born 1810)
- February 18 – Charlotte Cushman, actress (born 1816)
- April 9 – Charles Goodyear, politician (born 1804)
- April 23 – Archibald Dixon, U.S. Senator from Kentucky from 1852 to 1855 (born 1802)
- May 7 – William Buell Sprague, clergyman and biographer (born 1795)
- June 20 – John Neal, eccentric and influential writer, critic, lecturer, and activist (born 1793)
- June 25 – George Armstrong Custer, U.S. Army colonel (in battle) (born 1839)
- August 2 – Wild Bill Hickok, gunfighter and gambler (murdered) (born 1837)
- August 23 – Joseph R. Underwood, U.S. Senator from Kentucky from 1847 to 1853 (born 1791)
- September 27 – Braxton Bragg, U.S. and Confederate Army general (born 1817)
- October 1 – James Lick, land baron (born 1796)
- December 3 – Samuel Cooper, United States Army officer during the Second Seminole War and the Mexican–American War, highest-ranking Confederate general during the American Civil War (born 1798)
- December 9 – George Trenholm, 2nd Confederate States Secretary of the Treasury (born 1807)

== See also ==
- Timeline of United States history (1860–1899)
