= 1873 in the United States =

- Decades: 1850s; 1860s; 1870s; 1880s; 1890s
- See also: History of the United States (1865–1918); Timeline of United States history (1860–1899); List of years in the United States

Events from the year 1873 in the United States.

== Incumbents ==
=== Federal government ===
- President: Ulysses S. Grant (R-Illinois)
- Vice President:

Schuyler Colfax (R-Indiana) (until March 4)
Henry Wilson (R-Massachusetts) (starting March 4)

- Chief Justice: Salmon P. Chase (Ohio) (until May 7)
- Speaker of the House of Representatives: James G. Blaine (R-Maine)
- Congress: 42nd (until March 4), 43rd (starting March 4)

==== State governments ====
Governors and lieutenant governors

=== Governors ===
- Governor of Alabama: David P. Lewis (Republican)
- Governor of Arkansas: Ozra Amander Hadley (Republican) (until January 6), Elisha Baxter (Republican) (starting January 6)
- Governor of California: Newton Booth (Republican)
- Governor of Connecticut: Marshall Jewell (Republican) (until May 7), Charles R. Ingersoll (Democratic) (starting May 7)
- Governor of Delaware: James Ponder (Democratic)
- Governor of Florida: Harrison Reed (Republican) (until January 7), Ossian B. Hart (Republican) (starting January 7)
- Governor of Georgia: James M. Smith (Democratic)
- Governor of Illinois:
  - until January 13: John M. Palmer (Republican)
  - January 13-23: Richard J. Oglesby (Republican)
  - starting January 23: John Lourie Beveridge (Republican)
- Governor of Indiana: Conrad Baker (Republican) (until January 13), Thomas A. Hendricks (Democratic) (starting January 13)
- Governor of Iowa: Cyrus C. Carpenter (Republican)
- Governor of Kansas: James M. Harvey (Republican) (until January 13), Thomas A. Osborn (Republican) (starting January 13)
- Governor of Kentucky: Preston H. Leslie (Democratic)
- Governor of Louisiana:
  - until January 13: P. B. S. Pinchback (Republican)
  - January 13-May 22: John McEnery (Democratic)/(Liberal Republican)
  - starting May 22: William Pitt Kellogg (Republican)
- Governor of Maine: Sidney Perham (Republican)
- Governor of Maryland: William Pinkney Whyte (Democratic) (starting January 10)
- Governor of Massachusetts: William Claflin (Republican) (until January 4), William B. Washburn (Republican) (starting January 4)
- Governor of Michigan: Henry P. Baldwin (Republican) (until January 1), John J. Bagley (Republican) (starting January 1)
- Governor of Minnesota: Horace Austin (Republican)
- Governor of Mississippi: Ridgley C. Powers (Republican)
- Governor of Missouri: B. Gratz Brown (Liberal Republican) (until January 3), Silas Woodson (Democratic) (starting January 3)
- Governor of Nebraska: William H. James (Republican) (until January 13), Robert Wilkinson Furnas (Republican) (starting January 13)
- Governor of Nevada: Lewis R. Bradley (Democratic)
- Governor of New Hampshire: Ezekiel A. Straw (Republican)
- Governor of New Jersey: Joel Parker (Democratic)
- Governor of New York: John Adams Dix (Republican) (starting January 1)
- Governor of North Carolina: Tod Robinson Caldwell (Republican)
- Governor of Ohio: Edward F. Noyes (Republican)
- Governor of Oregon: La Fayette Grover (Democratic)
- Governor of Pennsylvania: John W. Geary (Republican) (until January 21), John F. Hartranft (Republican) (starting January 21)
- Governor of Rhode Island: Seth Padelford (Republican) (until May 27), Henry Howard (Republican) (starting May 27)
- Governor of South Carolina: Franklin I. Moses, Jr. (Republican)
- Governor of Tennessee: John C. Brown (Democratic)
- Governor of Texas: Edmund J. Davis (Republican)
- Governor of Vermont: Julius Converse (Republican)
- Governor of Virginia: Gilbert Carlton Walker (Democratic)
- Governor of West Virginia: John J. Jacob (Democratic)/(Independent)
- Governor of Wisconsin: Cadwallader C. Washburn (Republican)

=== Lieutenant governors ===
- Lieutenant Governor of Alabama: Alexander McKinstry (Republican)
- Lieutenant Governor of Arkansas: vacant (until January 6), Volney V. Smith (Republican) (starting January 6)
- Lieutenant Governor of California: Romualdo Pacheco (Republican)
- Lieutenant Governor of Connecticut: Morris Tyler (Republican) (until May 7), George G. Sill (Republican) (starting May 7)
- Lieutenant Governor of Florida: vacant (until month and day unknown), Marcellus Stearns (Republican) (starting month and day unknown)
- Lieutenant Governor of Illinois:
  - until January 13: John Dougherty (Republican)
  - January 13-23: John Lourie Beveridge (Republican)
  - starting January 23: John Early (Republican)
- Lieutenant Governor of Indiana: William Cumback (Republican) (until January 13), Leonidas Sexton (Republican) (starting January 13)
- Lieutenant Governor of Iowa: Henry C. Bulis (Republican)
- Lieutenant Governor of Kansas: Peter Percival Elder (Republican) (until January 13), Elias Sleeper Stover (Republican) (starting January 13)
- Lieutenant Governor of Kentucky: John G. Carlisle (Democratic)
- Lieutenant Governor of Louisiana:
  - until January 13: P. B. S. Pinchback (Republican)
  - January 13-May 22: Davidson B. Penn (Democratic)
  - starting May 22: Caesar Antoine (Republican)
- Lieutenant Governor of Massachusetts: Joseph Tucker (political party unknown) (until month and day unknown), Thomas Talbot (political party unknown) (starting month and day unknown)
- Lieutenant Governor of Michigan: Morgan Bates (Republican) (until month and day unknown), Henry H. Holt (Republican) (starting month and day unknown)
- Lieutenant Governor of Minnesota: William H. Yale (Republican)
- Lieutenant Governor of Mississippi: Alexander K. Davis (Republican)
- Lieutenant Governor of Missouri: vacant (until January 3), Charles Phillip Johnson (Liberal Republican) (starting January 3)
- Lieutenant Governor of Nevada: Frank Denver (political party unknown)
- Lieutenant Governor of New York: John C. Robinson (Republican) (starting January 1)
- Lieutenant Governor of North Carolina: vacant (until month and day unknown), Curtis Hooks Brogden (Republican) (starting month and day unknown)
- Lieutenant Governor of Ohio: Jacob Mueller (Republican)
- Lieutenant Governor of Rhode Island: Charles Cutler (political party unknown) (until May 27), Charles C. Van Zandt (political party unknown) (starting May 27)
- Lieutenant Governor of South Carolina: Richard Howell Gleaves (Republican)
- Lieutenant Governor of Tennessee: John C. Vaughn (Democratic) (until month and day unknown), A. T. Lacey (Democratic) (starting month and day unknown)
- Lieutenant Governor of Texas: vacant
- Lieutenant Governor of Vermont: Russell S. Taft (Republican)
- Lieutenant Governor of Virginia: John Lawrence Marye, Jr. (Conservative)
- Lieutenant Governor of Wisconsin: Milton H. Pettit (Republican) (until March 23), vacant (starting March 23)

== Events ==
=== January–March ===
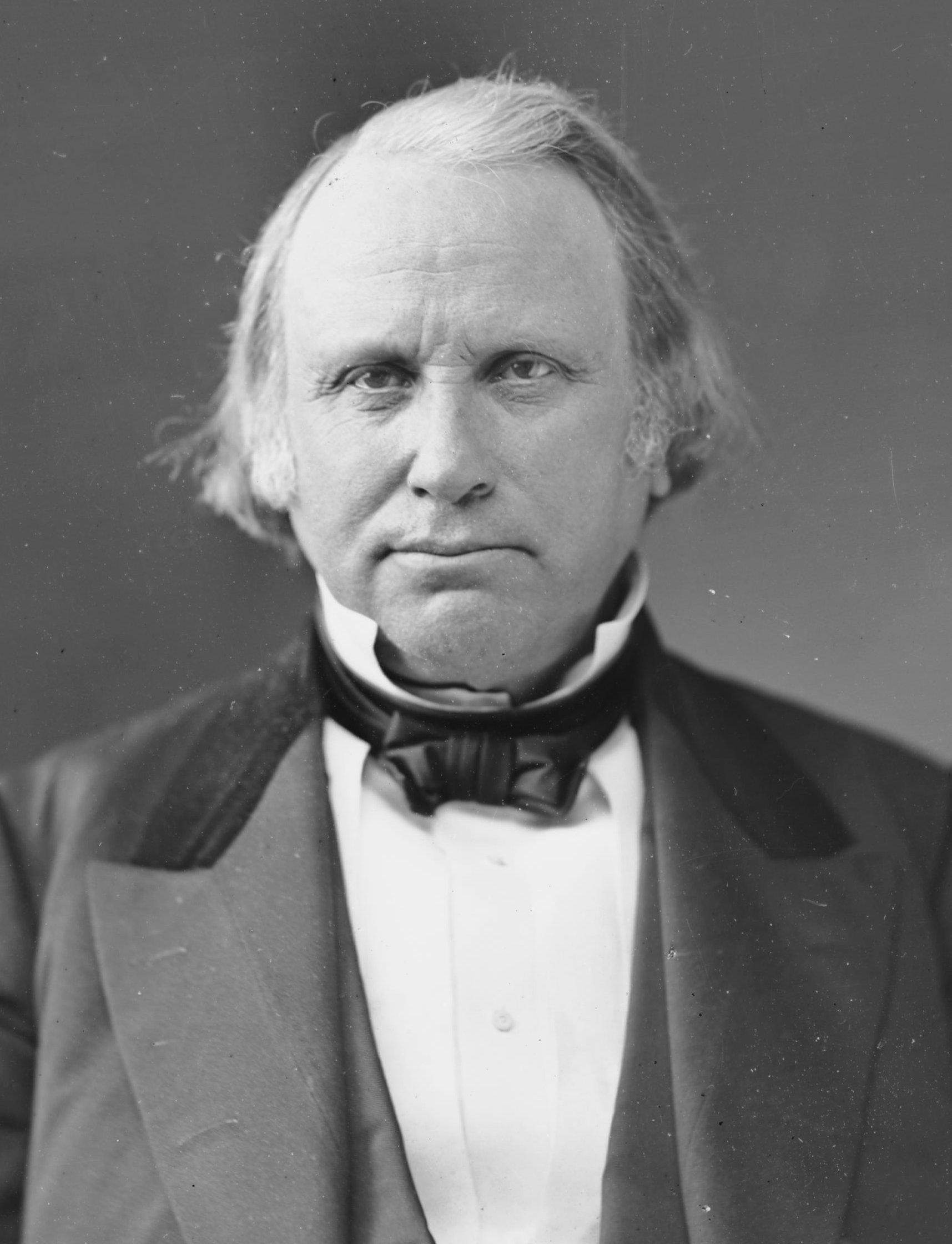
March 4: Henry Wilson becomes the 18th U.S. vice president

- January 1 – The California Penal Code goes into effect.
- January 17 – Indian Wars: The first Battle of the Stronghold is fought during the Modoc War.
- February 20 – The University of California opens its first medical school in San Francisco.
- March – Downers Grove, Illinois is incorporated.
- March 1 – E. Remington and Sons of Ilion, New York, start production of the first practical typewriter.
- March 3 – Censorship: The U.S. Congress enacts the Comstock Law, making it illegal to send any "obscene, lewd, or lascivious" books through the mail.
- March 4 – President Ulysses S. Grant begins his second term. Henry Wilson sworn in as Vice President of the United States.
- March 15 – The Phi Sigma Kappa fraternity is founded at the Massachusetts Agricultural College.
- March 22 – Emancipation Day for Puerto Rico: Slaves are freed (with a few exceptions).

=== April–June ===
- April 1
  - The Coinage Act of 1873 comes into force, ending bimetallism in the U.S. and placing the nation firmly on the gold standard.
  - Hinsdale, Illinois is incorporated.
- April 13 – Between 62 and 153 Republican freedmen and state militia die in the Colfax massacre in Louisiana while attempting to protect the Grant Parish courthouse, including about 50 who surrendered.
- April 15–17 – Indian Wars: The Second Battle of the Stronghold is fought.
- May – Henry Rose exhibits barbed wire at an Illinois county fair, which is taken up by Joseph Glidden and Jacob Haish, who invent a machine to mass-produce it.
- May 13 – First U.S. postal card is issued.
- May 20 – Levi Strauss and Jacob Davis receive United States patent 139121 for using copper rivets to strengthen the pockets of denim work pants. Levi Strauss & Co. begin manufacturing the famous Levi's brand of jeans, using fabric from the Amoskeag Manufacturing Company in Manchester, New Hampshire.
- May 23
  - The Preakness Stakes horse race first runs in Baltimore, Maryland.
  - Postal cards are sold in San Francisco for the first time.
- June 2 – Construction begins on the Clay Street Hill Railroad in San Francisco.
- June 4 – Indian Wars: The Modoc War ends with the capture of Kintpuash ("Captain Jack").

=== July–September ===
- July 21 – At Adair, Iowa, Jesse James and the James-Younger Gang pull off the first successful train robbery in the American West (US$3,000 from the Rock Island Express).
- August 4 – Indian Wars: While protecting a railroad survey party in Montana, the Seventh Cavalry, under Lieutenant Colonel George Armstrong Custer, clashes for the first time with the Sioux, near the Tongue River (only 1 man on each side is killed).
- September 6 – Regular cable car service begins on Clay Street, San Francisco.
- September 17 – The Ohio Agricultural and Mechanical College, later Ohio State University, opens its doors with 25 students, including 2 women.
- September 18 – The New York stock market crash triggers the Panic of 1873, part of the Long Depression.

=== October–December ===
- October 30 – P.T. Barnum's circus, The Greatest Show on Earth, debuts in New York City.
- December 15 – Women of Fredonia, New York march against the retail liquor dealers in town, inaugurating the Women's Crusade of 1873–74. This leads to the creation of the Woman's Christian Temperance Union.
- December 23 – Women's Crusade spreads to Hillsboro, Ohio.
- December 25 – Delta Gamma sorority founded in Oxford, Mississippi.

=== Undated ===
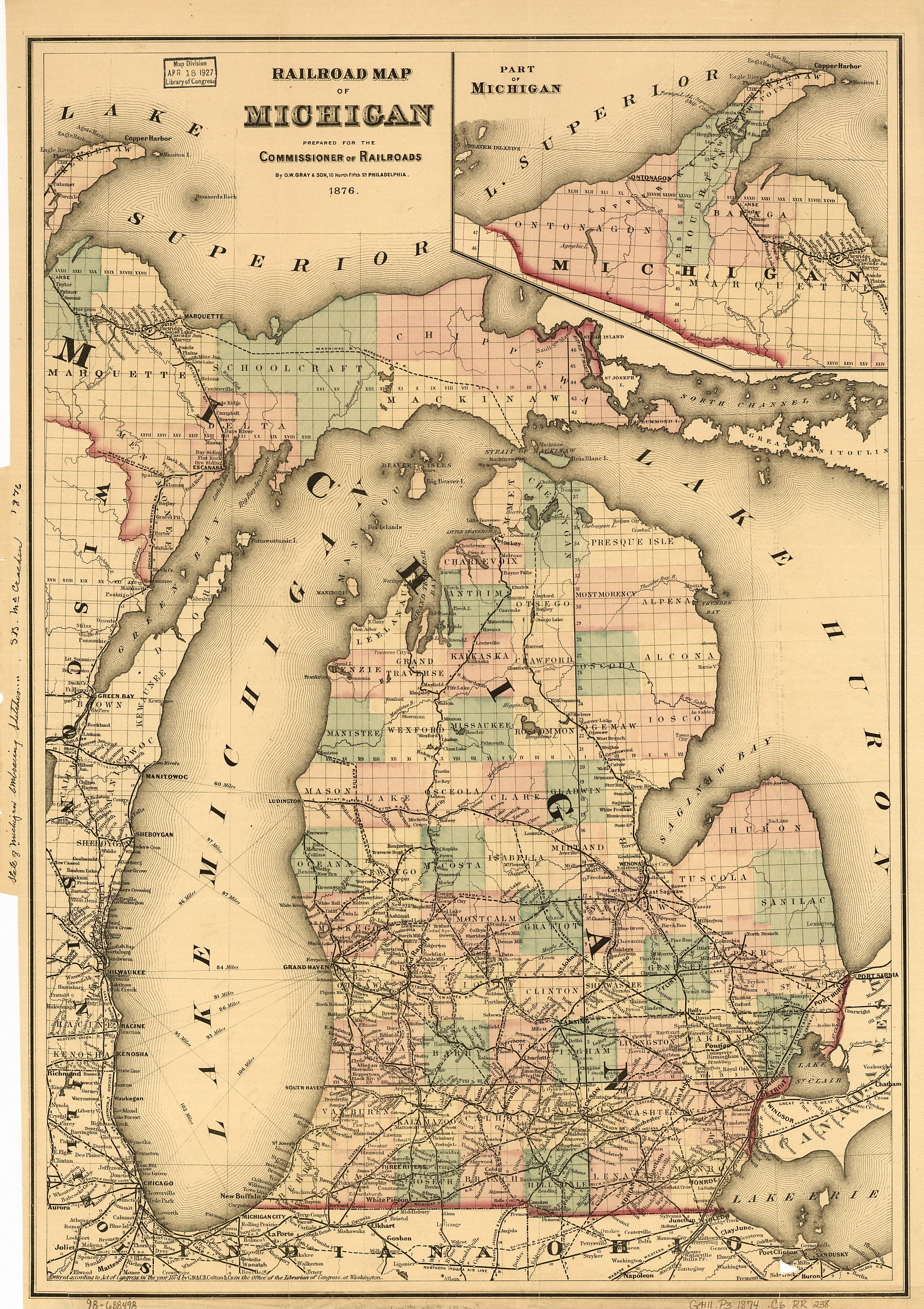
In 1873, railroads connect Northern Michigan port cities of Ludington, Traverse City and Petoskey. By 1880 the Great Lakes region would dominate logging, with Michigan producing more lumber than any other state.
- Railroads connect Northern Michigan port cities of Ludington, Traverse City and Petoskey.
- Coors Brewing Company begins making beer in Golden, Colorado.
- The Winchester Repeating Arms Company of New Haven first produces the 1873 model Winchester rifle, "The Gun That Won the West".
- Central Park is officially completed in New York City.
- Nine Pekin ducks are imported to Long Island (the first in the United States).
- Eliza Daniel Stewart organizes the Woman's Temperance League in Osborn, Ohio.

=== Ongoing ===
- Reconstruction era (1865–1877)
- Gilded Age (1869–c. 1896)
- Depression of 1873–79 (1873–1879)

== Births ==
- January 2 – John M. Robsion, U.S. Senator from Kentucky in 1930 (died 1948)
- January 4 – Blanche Walsh, stage and screen actress (died 1915)
- January 8 – Grace Van Studdiford, stage actress and opera singer (died 1927)
- January 9 – Thomas Curtis, hurdler (died 1944)
- February 4 – Joel R. P. Pringle, admiral (died 1932)
- February 11 – Louis Charles Christopher Krieger, mycologist (died 1940)
- March 3 – William Green, labor leader (died 1952)
- March 5 – Thomas Harrison Montgomery, Jr., zoologist and cell biologist (died 1912)
- March 29 – Billy Quirk, silent film actor (died 1926)
- April 7 – John McGraw, baseball player and manager (died 1934)
- April 13 – John W. Davis, politician, diplomat and lawyer (died 1955)
- May 5 – Leon Czolgosz, assassin of President William McKinley (executed 1901)
- May 9
  - Anton Cermak, Mayor of Chicago (died 1933)
  - Lois Irene Marshall, née Kimsey, Second Lady of the United States as wife of Thomas R. Marshall (died 1958)
- April 22 – Ellen Glasgow, novelist (died 1945)
- July 6 – Ethel Sands, painter (died 1962 in the United Kingdom)
- July 11 – Nat M. Wills, vaudeville entertainer (died 1917)
- August 3 – Alexander Posey, Native American poet, journalist, humorist and politician (drowned 1908)
- August 5 – Joseph Russell Knowland, politician and newspaperman (died 1966)
- August 10 – William Ernest Hocking, philosopher (died 1966)
- August 11 – J. Rosamond Johnson, African American composer and singer (died 1954)
- August 17 – John A. Sampson, gynecologist (died 1946)
- August 18 – Otto Harbach, lyricist (died 1963)
- August 21 – Harry T. Morey, stage and screen actor (died 1936)
- August 25 – Blanche Bates, stage and screen actress (died 1941)
- August 26 – Lee de Forest, inventor (died 1961)
- September 2 – Bessie Van Vorst, campaigning journalist (died 1928)
- September 5 – Cornelius Vanderbilt III, military officer, inventor and engineer (died 1942)
- September 8 – David O. McKay, president of the Church of Jesus Christ of Latter-day Saints (died 1970)
- September 14 – Josiah Bailey, U.S. Senator from North Carolina from 1931 to 1946 (died 1946)
- September 21 – Papa Jack Laine, New Orleans brass band leader (died 1966)
- October 2 – Stephen Warfield Gambrill, U.S. Congressman for Maryland's 5th District (died 1924)
- October 3 – Emily Post, etiquette expert (died 1960)
- October 8 – Ma Barker, née Kate Clark, matriarch of the Barker–Karpis gang (killed 1935)
- October 9 – Charles Rudolph Walgreen, businessman (died 1939)
- October 10 – George Cabot Lodge, poet (died 1909)
- October 14 – Ray Ewry, field athlete (died 1937)
- October 17 – William Luther Hill, U.S. Senator from Florida in 1936 (died 1951)
- October 18 – Harris Laning, admiral (died 1941)
- October 19 – Bart King, cricketer (died 1965)
- October 29 – Lester J. Dickinson, U.S. Senator from Iowa from 1931 to 1937 (died 1968)
- November 10 – David Lynn, architect, Architect of the Capitol from 1923 to 1954 (died 1961)
- November 16 – W. C. Handy, African American composer, "father of the Blues" (died 1958)
- November 28 – Frank Phillips, oil executive (died 1950)
- December 7 – Willa Cather, novelist (died 1947)
- December 12 – Lola Ridge, poet (died 1941)
- December 30 – Al Smith, politician (died 1944)
- Undated – Thomas Chrostwaite, educator (died 1958)

== Deaths ==
- February 1 – Matthew Fontaine Maury, oceanographer (born 1806)
- March 4 – Alfred Iverson Sr., U.S. Senator from Georgia from 1855 to 1861 (born 1798)
- March 10 – John Torrey, botanist (born 1796)
- March 27 – James Dixon, U.S. Senator from Connecticut from 1857 to 1869 (born 1814)
- March 31 – Hugh Maxwell, lawyer and politician (born 1787)
- April 11 – Edward Canby, general (born 1817)
- May 7 – Salmon P. Chase, 6th Chief Justice of the United States, 25th United States Secretary of the Treasury (born 1808)
- May 9 – Frederick Goddard Tuckerman, poet (born 1821)
- June 11 – Richard Saltonstall Rogers, shipping merchant and politician (born 1790)
- October 5 – William Todd, businessman and Canadian senate nominee (born 1803)
- November 9 – Stephen Mallory, U.S. Senator from Florida from 1851 to 1861 (born 1812)
- November 27 – Richard Yates, U.S. Senator from Illinois from 1865 to 1871 (born 1815)
- December 14 – Louis Agassiz, geologist and zoologist (born 1807 in Switzerland)
- December 23 – Sarah Moore Grimké, abolitionist writer (born 1792)
- December 24 – Johns Hopkins, entrepreneur and benefactor (born 1795)

== See also ==
- Timeline of United States history (1860–1899)
