= 1876 Illinois lieutenant gubernatorial election =

- November 7, 1876
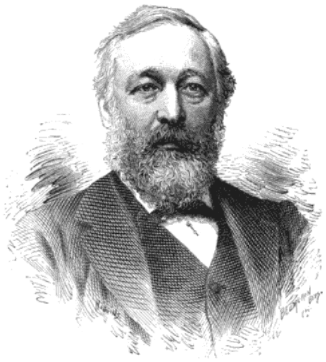

Nominee	Andrew Shuman	Archibald A. Glenn
Party	Republican	Democratic
Popular vote	278,167	255,970
Percentage	50.38%	46.36%
Lieutenant Governor before election
Archibald A. Glenn (Acting)
Democratic
Elected Lieutenant Governor
Andrew Shuman
Republican

The 1876 Illinois lieutenant gubernatorial election was held on November 7, 1876, in order to elect the lieutenant governor of Illinois. Republican nominee Andrew Shuman defeated Democratic nominee and incumbent acting lieutenant governor Archibald A. Glenn and Greenback nominee James H. Pickrell.

== General election ==
On election day, November 7, 1876, Republican nominee Andrew Shuman won the election by a margin of 22,197 votes against his foremost opponent Democratic nominee Archibald A. Glenn, thereby gaining Republican control over the office of lieutenant governor. Shuman was sworn in as the 21st lieutenant governor of Illinois on January 3, 1877.

=== Results ===
Illinois lieutenant gubernatorial election, 1876
Party	Candidate	Votes	%
Republican	Andrew Shuman	278,167	50.38
Democratic	Archibald A. Glenn (incumbent)	255,970	46.36
Greenback	James H. Pickrell	18,053	3.26
Total votes		552,190	100.00
Republican gain from Democratic			

== See also ==
- 1876 Illinois gubernatorial election
