= Charles Coghlan =

Charles Coghlan may refer to:

- Charles Coghlan (actor, born 1842) (1842–1899), Irish actor and playwright
- Charles F. Coghlan (actor, born 1896) (1896–1972), Broadway actor, nephew of the above
- Charles Coghlan (politician) (1863–1927), first premier of Southern Rhodesia
