= Gertrude Coghlan =

American actress

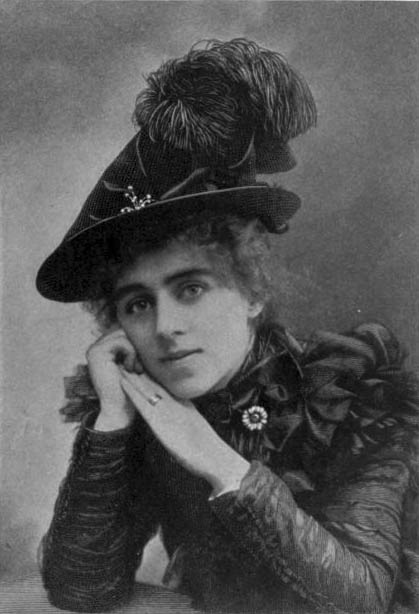
- Coghlan in 1898
- Born: February 1, 1876; Hertfordshire, England
- Died: September 11, 1952 (aged 76); Bayside, New York City, U.S.
- Occupation: Actress
- Spouse: Augustus Pitou
- Parent(s): Charles Francis Coghlan; Louisa Elizabeth Thorn
- Relatives: Rose Coghlan (aunt or half-aunt); Charles F. Coghlan (either cousin or half-brother); Kühne Beveridge (stepmother)

Gertrude Coghlan Pitou (née Gertrude Evelyn Coghlan; February 1, 1876 – September 11, 1952) was an English actress born in Hertfordshire, England. She is known for her role in the play The Travelling Salesman and other roles in silent cinema as: The Royal Box (1914), The Countess and the Burglar (1914) and Her Ladyship (1914).

== Biography ==
She was Charles Francis Coghlan's daughter by Louisa Elizabeth Thorn and cousin (or older half-sister) of Charles F. Coghlan also a stage actor. Coughlan – on July 2, 1906, in Allegan, Michigan – married Augustus Pitou (1843–1915), a theatrical producer.

Gertrude joined her father's acting company, playing Juliet in the Broadway production of the Royal Box and afterwards on the road. Coghlan, who took to the stage at age sixteen, went on to have a theatrical career spanning nearly fifty years.

Coghlan died on September 11, 1952, in Bayside, New York City.

== Filmography ==
- The Royal Box (1914) as Celia Pryse
- Her Ladyship (Short, 1914) as Lady Cecile
- The Countess and the Burglar (Short, 1914) as The Countess

== Broadway ==
- The Royal Box (1898) as Juliet
- The Sorceress (1904) performer (no character name)
- Once Upon A Time (1905) Dona Ana
- The Traveling Salesman (1908) as Beth Elliot
- The Noble Spaniard (1909) performer (no character name)
- Plumes in the Dust (1936) as Elizabeth Ellet
