= 17th Illinois Cavalry Regiment =

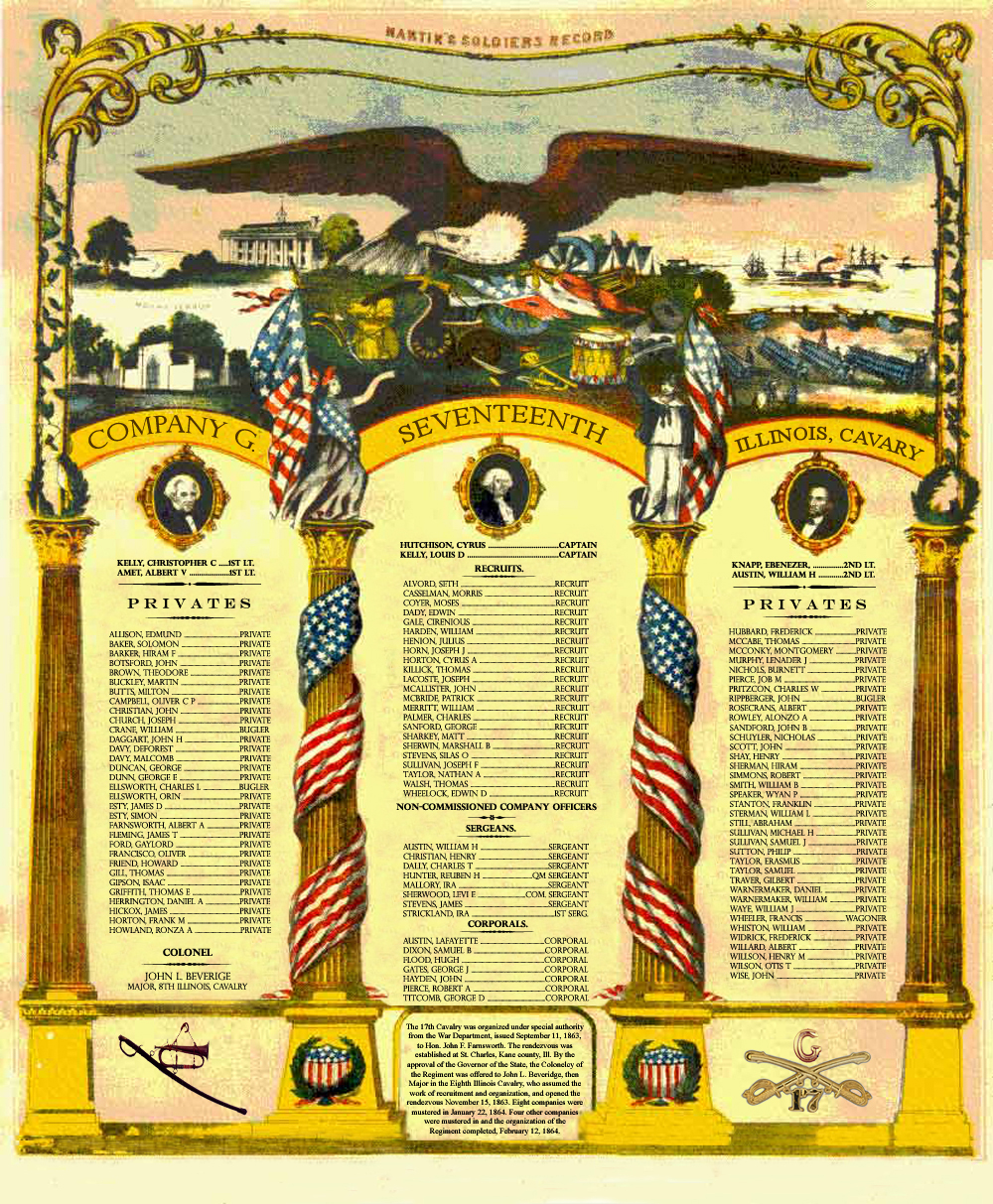
- 17th Illinois Cavalry, Company G roster
- Active: 28 Jan. 1864 – 22 Dec. 1865
- Country: United States
- Allegiance: (United States) Union; Illinois
- Branch: Union Army
- Type: Cavalry
- Size: Regiment
- Engagements: American Civil War; Battle of Glasgow (1864); Battle of Little Blue River (1864); Second Battle of Independence (1864); Battle of Westport (1864); Battle of Mine Creek (1864); Battle of Marais des Cygnes (1864)

Commanders
- Notable commanders: John Lourie Beveridge

The 17th Illinois Cavalry Regiment was a cavalry regiment from Illinois that served in the Union Army during the latter part of the American Civil War. The regiment guarded prisoners for several months. Elements of the unit engaged in skirmishes with Confederate partisans in Missouri. The regiment participated in several major actions during Price's Missouri Expedition. Subsequently, the unit performed garrison duty in Missouri and operations against Native Americans in the Great Plains. The soldiers were mustered out of service between 23 November and 22 December 1865.

== Service ==
The 17th Illinois Cavalry was organized at St. Charles, Illinois, between January 28 and February 12, 1864.

A portion of their service was in pursuing the guerrilla Bill Anderson. On 23 September 1864, they killed Jim Anderson and five other guerrillas near Rocheport, Missouri.

17th Illinois served in the 2nd Brigade of the Provisional Cavalry, while pursuing the Confederates during Price's Raid, under Colonel John Lourie Beveridge, who would later become governor of Illinois.

The regiment mustered out between November 23 and December 22, 1865.

== From Dyer ==
Organized at St. Charles. Ills., and 8 Companies mustered in January 28, 1864. Four Companies mustered in February 12, 1864. Moved to St. Louis, Mo., May 3, 1864. Equipped at Jefferson Barracks and moved to Alton, Ill. Guard prisoners there until August. 1st Battalion, Cos. "A," "B," "C," "D," ordered to St. Louis June, 1864, thence to District of North Missouri. Engaged in Escort and Provost duty at St. Joseph and Weston, Mo., until June, 1865. Cos. "C" and "D" moved to Jefferson City September, 1864. Defense of Jefferson City October 6–7. Joined Regiment. 2nd Battalion--"E," "F," "G" and "H"—ordered from Alton, Ills., to Glasgow, Mo., June, 1864, and duty there operating against Thornton's Command until September. Skirmish at Allen July 23 (Co. "G"). Huntsville July 24 (Co. "F"). Dripping Springs August 15–16 (Co. "F"). Columbia August 16 (Co. "F"). Rocheport August 20 (Co. "F"). Battalion moved to Rolla, Mo., arriving September 23, 1864. 3rd Battalion at Alton, Ills., until August, 1864. Moved to Benton Barracks, thence to Rolla, Mo., arriving there September 19. Operations against Price's invasion of Missouri September to November. Cover Ewing's retreat from Pilot Knob to Rolla, September 27–30. Moved to Jefferson City, Mo. Defense of Jefferson City October 6–7. Moreau Bottom October 7. Booneville October 9–12. Glasgow October 15. Little Blue October 21. Independence October 22. Hickman's Mill October 23. Mine Creek, Little Osage, Marias Des Cygnes, Kansas, October 25. Returned to Springfield, Mo., thence moved to Cassville and Rolla, arriving November 15. Duty there until January, 1865. At Pilot Knob, Mo., until April, and at Cape Girardeau until June. Moved to Kansas and duty on the Plains until November. Mustered out Companies "C," "E," "I" and "M," November 23, and rest of Regiment December 15 to 22, 1865.

== Total strength and casualties ==
The regiment suffered 7 enlisted men who were killed in action or who died of their wounds and 1 officer and 86 enlisted men who died of disease, for a total of 94 fatalities.

== Commanders ==
- Colonel John Lourie Beveridge - mustered out February 7, 1866.

== Bugler ==
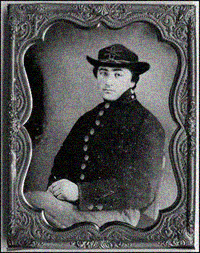
John D. Rippberger 1844-1928

- John David Rippberger - On January 6, 1864, when John was just 18 years old and the Civil War was raging, he volunteered for service with the union forces in Howard, McHenry County, Illinois, where he later mustered into the Cavalry on January 22, 1864, in St. Charles, Illinois. His enlistment was for three years, and he was assigned to Private in Company G, 17th Illinois Cavalry Regiment as a full bugler under Captain Cyrus Hutchinson.
- At the close of the war on December 18, 1865, in Ft. Leavenworth, KS. John Rippberger was mustered out by Lieutenant Williamson, and honorably discharged at Springfield, Illinois. After almost two years of hard service he held the rank of Full Bugler. His Colonel's name was John L. Beverige, a fine man and good friend.

Copyright. John David Rippberger, Last Comrade of Stoddard Post G.A.R.

== See also ==
- List of Illinois Civil War Units
- Illinois in the American Civil War
