= Coghlan's Guides =

Travel guide book series by Francis Coghlan

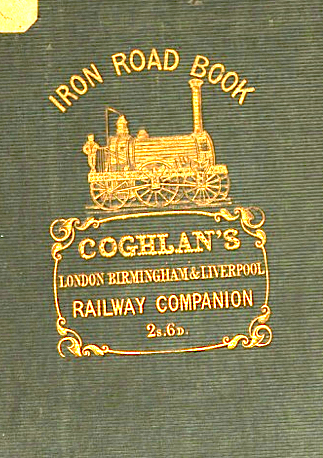
Iron Road Book, 1838

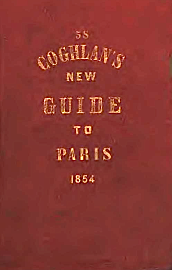
Coghlan's New Guide to Paris, 1854

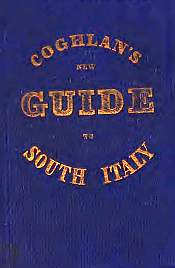
Coghlan's Guide to South Italy, 1863

Coghlan's Guides were a series of travel guide books to Europe written by Francis Coghlan in the mid-19th century.

== List of Coghlan's Guides by date of publication ==
=== 1820s ===
- A Guide to France, or, Travellers their own commissioners: shewing the cheapest and most expeditious system of travelling ... Illustrated with an engraved plan of Calais, etc. J. Onwhyn: London, 1828

=== 1830s-1840s ===
- Francis Coghlan (1830), Guide to France (5th ed.), London: J. Onwhyn
- Francis Coghlan (1838). Guide through Switzerland and Chamounix. London: A.H. Baily and Co.
- Francis Coghlan (1838). Iron Road Book and Railway Companion from London to Birmingham, Manchester, and Liverpool. London: A.H. Baily & Co.
- Francis Coghlan (1843). Hand-book to the Channel Islands. London: Simpkin, Marshall, & Co.
- Francis Coghlan (1844). Hand-book for Central Europe. London: H. Hughes.
- Francis Coghlan (1845). Handbook for European Tourists.
  - Francis Coghlan (1847). Handbook for European Tourists (2nd ed.). London: H. Hughes. + Indexes
- Francis Coghlan (1847). Coghlan's Pocket Picture of London and its Environs. London: H. Hughes.

=== 1850s-1860s ===
- Francis Coghlan (1853), Miniature Guide to Paris and its Environs, London: J. Onwhyn
- Francis Coghlan (1853), Miniature Guide to the Rhine, through Belgium and Holland, Northern and Southern Germany, London: J. Onwhyn + Index
- Francis Coghlan (1854), New Guide to Paris and its Environs, London: J. Onwhyn
- Charles Francis Coghlan, Jr. (1858). Beauties of Baden-Baden. London: F. Coghlan. + Contents
- Francis Coghlan (1860). Guide to North Wales. London: Simpkin, Marshall, & Co.
- Coghlan's Handbook for Travellers in Southern Italy, Comprising Rome, Naples, and Sicily, Trübner & Co, 1863
- Coghlan's Belgium, Holland, the Rhine and Switzerland; the fashionable German watering places (17th ed.). London: Trubner & Co. 1861.
- Coghlan's Illustrated Guide to the Rhine, with routes Through Belgium, Holland and France (18th ed.). London: Trubner & Co. 1863. + Index

== List of Coghlan's Guides by geographic coverage ==
=== Belgium ===
- Belgium. London: F. Coghlan.
- Brussels. London: F. Coghlan.
- Coghlan's Illustrated Guide to the Rhine, with routes Through Belgium, Holland and France (18th ed.). London: Trubner & Co. 1863. + Index

=== France ===
- Boulogne. London: F. Coghlan.
- Calais. London: F. Coghlan.
- Francis Coghlan (1830), Guide to France (5th ed.), London: J. Onwhyn + Index
- Francis Coghlan (1853), Miniature Guide to Paris and its Environs, London: J. Onwhyn
- Through France. London: F. Coghlan.

=== Germany ===
- Francis Coghlan (1853), Miniature Guide to the Rhine, through Belgium and Holland, Northern and Southern Germany, London: J. Onwhyn + Index
- Charles Francis Coghlan, Jr. (1858). Beauties of Baden-Baden. London: F. Coghlan. + Contents

=== Great Britain ===
- Brighton and its Environs. London: A.H. Baily and Co.
- Coast Companion to Rye-Winchelsea-Hastings-St. Leonards-East-Bourne-Brighton-Worthing-and Bognor. London : H. Hughes, [1830?]
- Companion to Gravesend, Herne Bay, and Canterbury. London: A.H. Baily and Co.
- Companion to Hastings, Brighton, Worthing, &c. London: A.H. Baily and Co.
- Companion to Margate, Ramsgate, Dover, & c. London: A.H. Baily and Co.
- Companion to Southampton and the Isle of Wight. London: A.H. Baily and Co.
- Dovor Guide. London: A.H. Baily and Co.
- Francis Coghlan (1860). Guide to North Wales. London: Simpkin, Marshall, & Co.
- Francis Coghlan (1838). Iron Road Book and Railway Companion from London to Birmingham, Manchester, and Liverpool. London: A.H. Baily & Co. + Contents
- Iron Road Book and Railway Companion to Bath and Bristol. London: A.H. Baily and Co.
- Iron Road Book and Railway Companion to Birmingham. London: A.H. Baily and Co.
- Iron Road Book and Railway Companion to Southampton. London: A.H. Baily and Co.
- Pocket Picture of London. London: A.H. Baily and Co.
- Stranger's Guide in London. London: A.H. Baily and Co.
- Francis Coghlan (c. 1830s). Stranger's London Guide (2nd ed.). London: Thomas Geeves. + Index

=== Italy ===
- Francis Coghlan (1845), Hand-Book for Italy, London: H. Hughes, OCLC 8457177
  - Francis Coghlan (1845), Hand-Book for Italy (2nd ed.), London
- Coghlan's Handbook for Travellers in Southern Italy, Comprising Rome, Naples, and Sicily (5th ed.), Trübner & Co, 1863 + Index

=== Netherlands ===
- Tourist's Companion through the Netherlands, up the Rhine, and Switzerland. London: A.H. Baily and Co.

=== Russia ===
- Francis Coghlan (1834). Guide to St. Petersburgh and Moscow, by Hamburg, Lubeck, Travemunde, and by Steam Packet across the Baltic, to Cronstadt, &c. London.
- St. Petersburgh. London: F. Coghlan.

=== Switzerland ===
- Francis Coghlan (1838). Guide through Switzerland and Chamounix. London: A.H. Baily and Co.
  - Francis Coghlan (1839). Guide through Switzerland and Chamounix. London: A.H. Baily and Co. + Index

== See also ==
- Charles Francis Coghlan, thespian son of Coghlan
