= Charles F. Coghlan (actor, born 1896) =

American actor

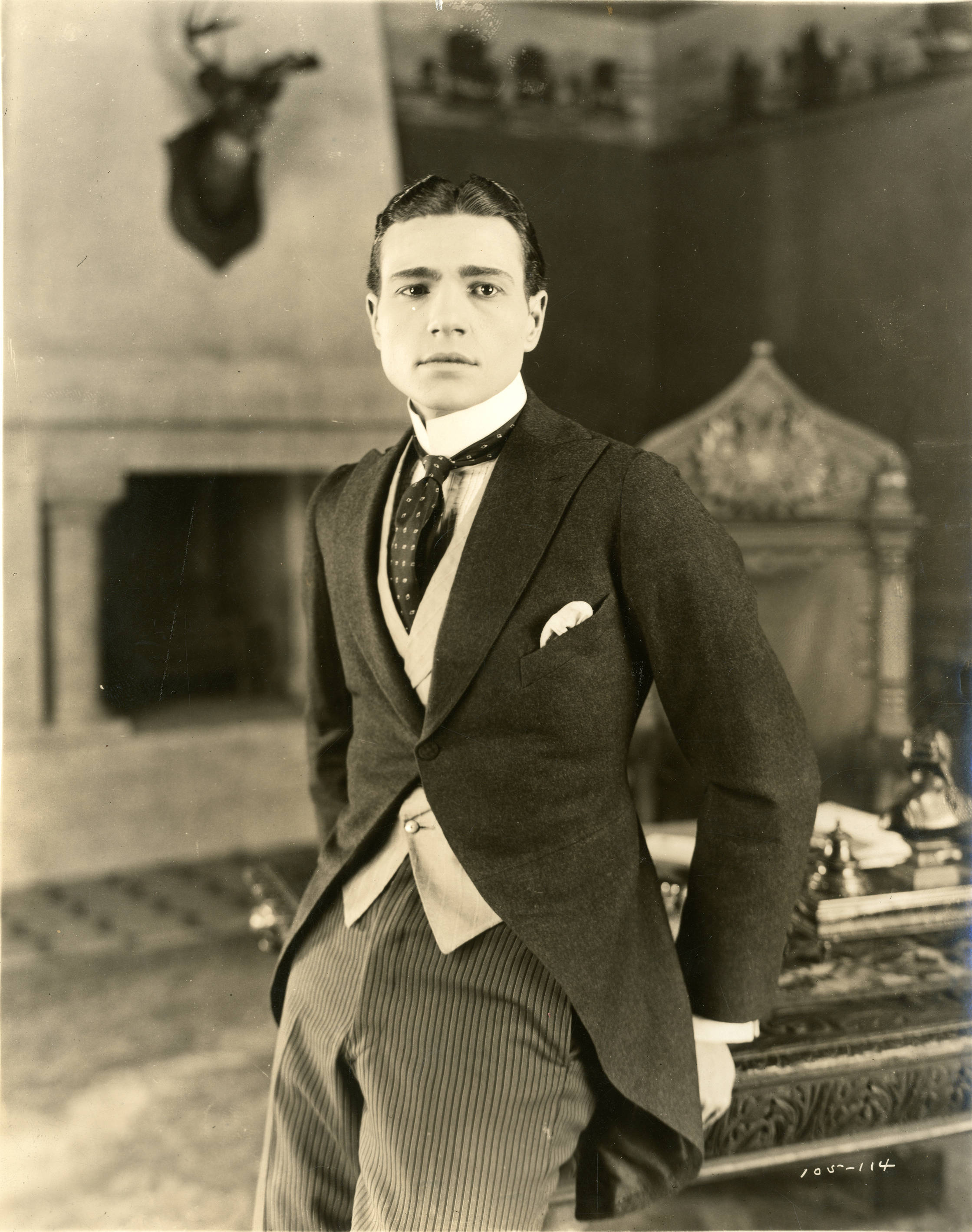
Coghlan in 1923

Charles F. Coghlan (December 1, 1896 – March 16, 1972) was an American actor and writer.

== Biography ==
Coghlan born in Boston, Massachusetts, was the alleged son of Charles Francis Coghlan and nephew of Rose Coghlan. Another source has it that Charles F. Coghlan is the son of Elizabeth "Eily" Coghlan, another sister of Charles Francis Coghlan and Rose Coghlan, and a man named Sydney Battam or Bratton. The story has it that Elizabeth "Eily" died in 1900 and Charles F. was adopted by Rose Coghlan. Still another angle has Charles F. being the result of an affair between Rose Coghlan and the Prince of Wales (aka Edward VII). Whatever his origins, Charles F. Coghlan bears a strong resemblance to Rose Coghlan and is buried in the same plot with her. A relative Gertrude Coghlan was the daughter of Rose's brother Charles Coghlan.

Coghlan died in Hershey, Pennsylvania.

== Partial filmography ==
- Jim the Penman (1921)
- Silas Marner (1922)
- The Royal Box (1929) (from his play)
