= Charles Coghlan (actor, born 1842) =

Irish actor and playwright (1842–1899)

Charles Francis Coghlan
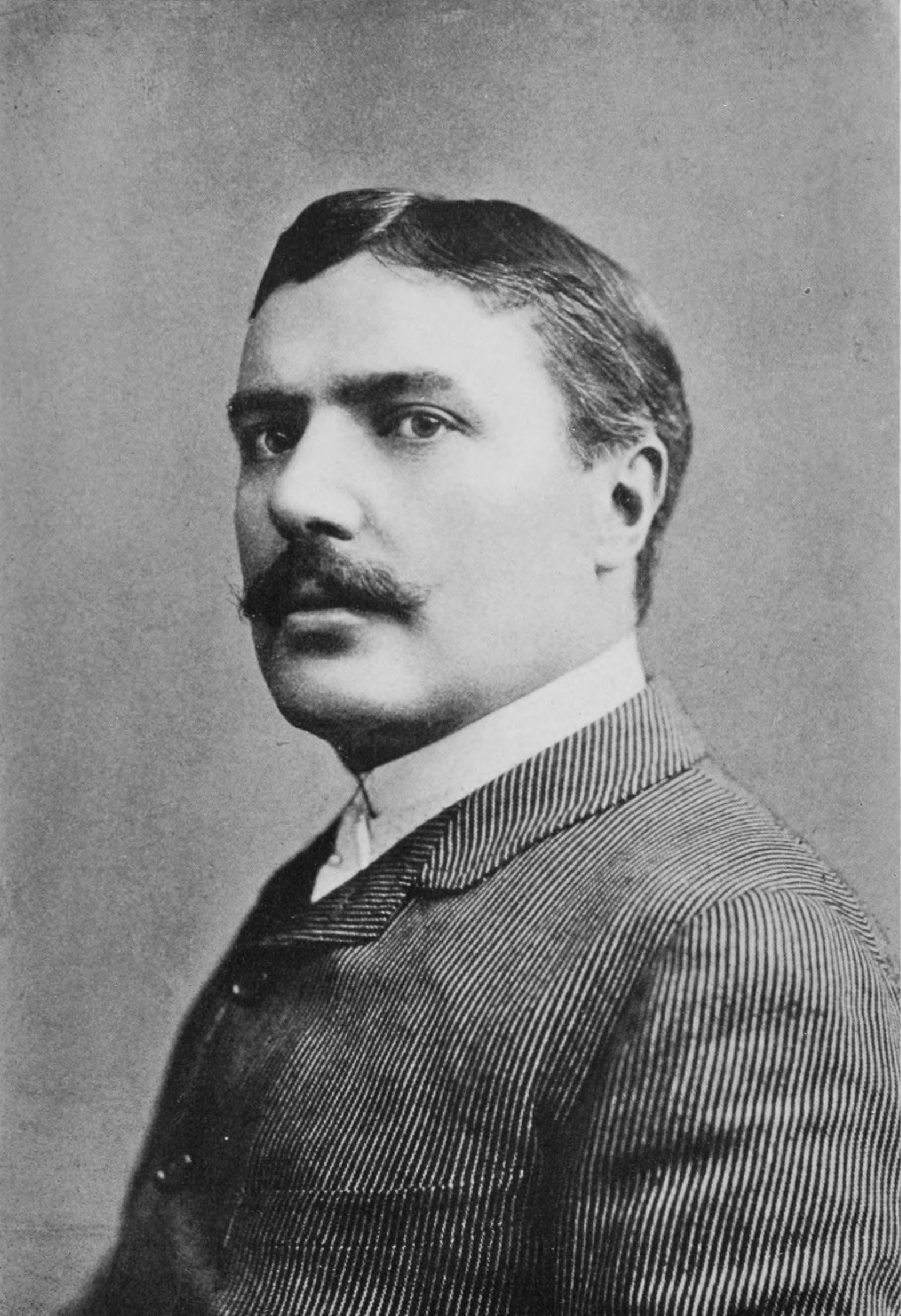
- The Wallet of Time, 1913
- Born: Charles Francis Coghlan; 11 June 1842; Paris, France
- Died: 27 November 1899 (aged 57); Galveston, Texas, US
- Occupations: Actor and playwright
- Years active: 1859-1899
- Spouse: Kühne Beveridge
- Partner: Louisa Elizabeth Thorn
- Relatives: Rose Coghlan (sister or half-sister); Gertrude Coghlan (daughter); Charles F. Coghlan (either nephew or son)

Charles Francis Coghlan (11 June 1842 – 27 November 1899) was an Irish actor and playwright popular on both sides of the Atlantic Ocean.

== Early life ==
Charles F. Coghlan was born on 11 June 1842, in Paris, France, to British subjects, Francis (sometimes spelled Frances) and Amie Marie (née Ruhly) Coghlan. His father, a native of Dublin, Ireland, was the founder of Coghlan's Continental Dispatch and publisher of Coghlan's Continental Guides, and counted among his friends, Charles Dickens, Charles Reade, and other literary figures of the day. Amie Coghlan was born on the English Channel Island of Jersey sometime around 1821. Charles Coghlan was later raised in Peterborough, Cambridgeshire and Hull, Yorkshire and though originally groomed for a career in law he had chosen instead to be an actor whilst still in his teens.

== Career ==
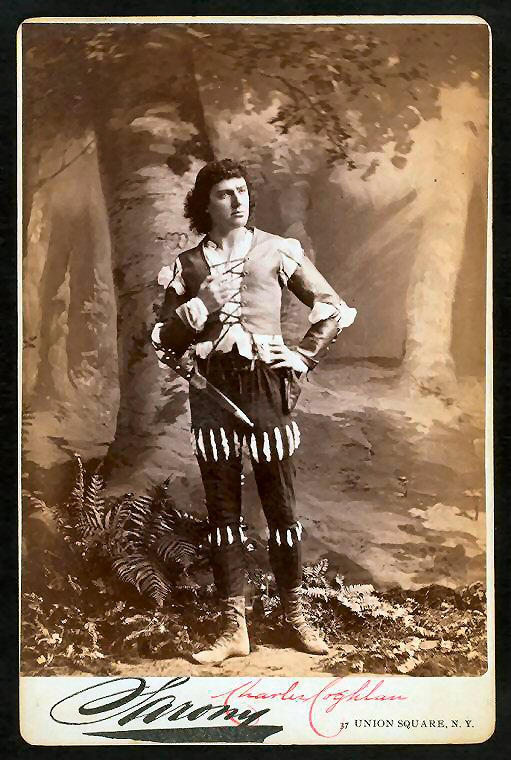
As Orlando in As You Like It 1876

Charles Coghlan began his stage career in 1859 as a minor player with the Sadler's Wells Theatre's summer tour. During their engagement in Dublin, Ireland, Coghlan approached John Baldwin Buckstone, then manager of the Haymarket Theatre, with a play he had written. Buckstone passed on the play, but instead gave him the chance to play Monsieur Mafoi, a small role in The Pilgrim of Love, a play adapted by Lord Byron from Irving's Tales of the Alhambra, that opened at the Haymarket on 9 April 1860. Over the following few seasons Coghlan would play a number of supporting roles that steadily increased his stature as an actor. In 1868 he played Charles Surface in Sheridan's School for Scandal at the St James's Theatre, and later that year played Sir Oscar opposite Adelaide Neilson in Marston's Life for Life at the Prince of Wales Theatre. Coghlan would remain with Prince of Wales over the next seven or eight seasons, playing leading roles such as Geoffrey Delamayn in Collins' Man and Wife and Harry Speadbrow in Gilbert's Sweethearts.

In 1876 Augustin Daly brought Coghlan to America where he would spend the greater balance of his career. He made his Broadway debut on 12 September 1876, at the Fifth Avenue Theater, as Alfred Evelyn in Lord Lytton's Money and was an instant success. Two months later, at the same venue, Coghlan played Orlando opposite Fanny Davenport's Rosalind in Shakespeare's As You Like It. The next season Coghlan was engaged as the leading man at the Union Square Theater, where he played Jean Remind during the successful run of Augustus R. Cazauran's The Celebrated Case. He returned to London in 1881 to play Col. Woods, U.S.A. in the long-running The Colonel, produced at the Prince of Wales. On 13 December 1890 Coughlan was declared bankrupt. He had liabilities of £315. The pinnacle of Coghlan's near twenty-five-year career in America came on 2 December 1898, at the Fifth Avenue Theater in his own adaptation of the Dumas' play Kean titled The Royal Box, in which he played the part of the actor Clarence. This great success was tempered the following year by the failure of his play Citizen Pierre, in which he made his last New York performance. During his career Coghlan had played opposite his sister, Rose Coghlan, and in support of Lillie Langtry and Minnie Maddern Fiske. His last appearance on the stage was at Houston, Texas, on 28 October 1899, as Clarence in The Royal Box.

Following his death, in 1901, Coghlan's sister, Rose, appeared at Denver, Colorado's, Elitch Theatre in the world premiere of Coghlan's Fortune's Bridge. Rose stated that "my particular reason for coming to Denver was to produce my brother's play – the one he finished just before his death. It's called Fortune's Bridge, but he didn't give it the name." Rose explained that the manuscript was sent to a typist and at the end her brother signed it and added his Canadian address: "Charles Coghlan, Fortune's Bridge." Apparently the typist moved it to the head of the first page and typed, "Fortune's Bridge, by Charles Coghlan." Rose stated "the name seemed to fit the play so well I allowed it to stand."

== Marriage ==
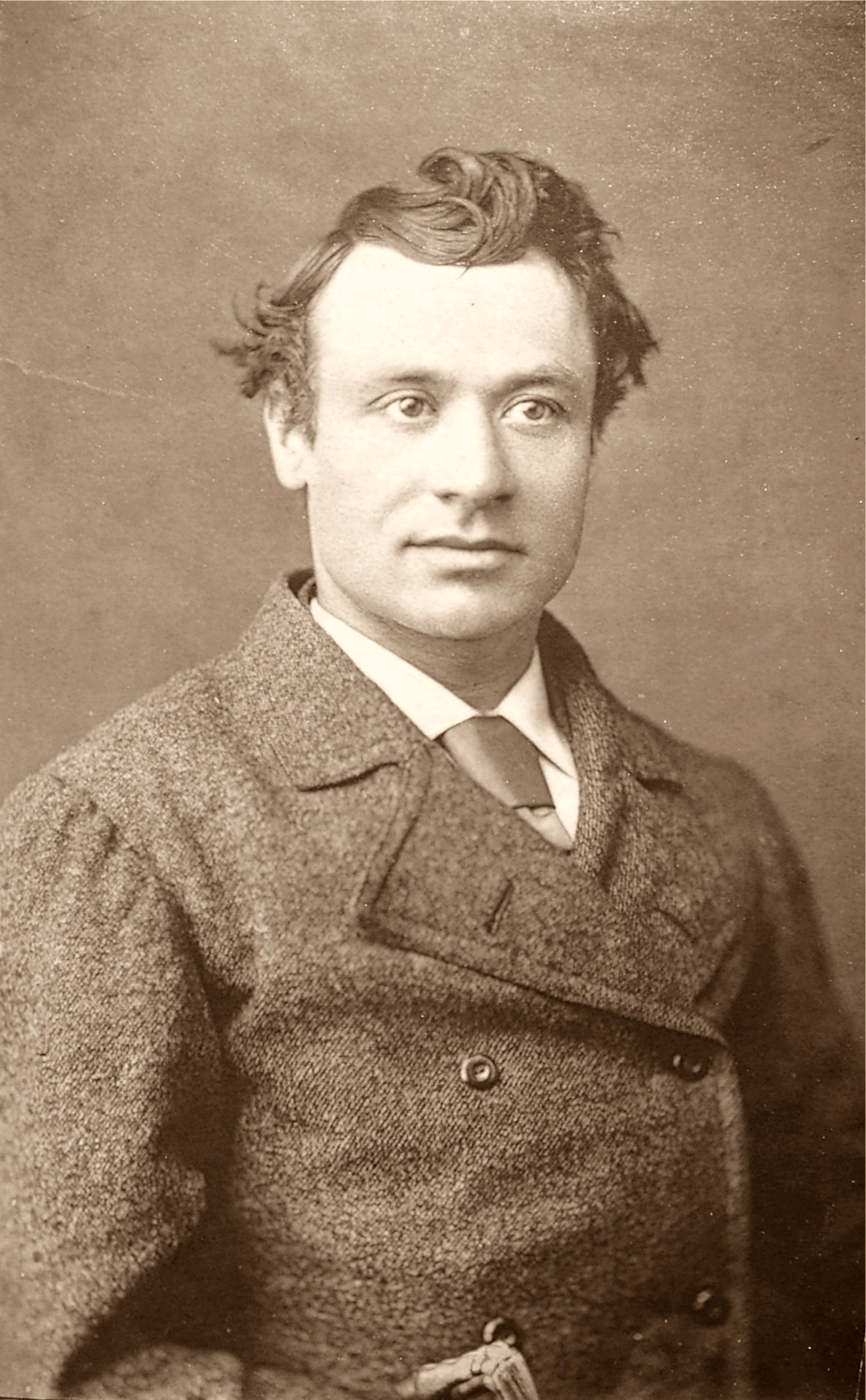
Charles Francis Coghlan

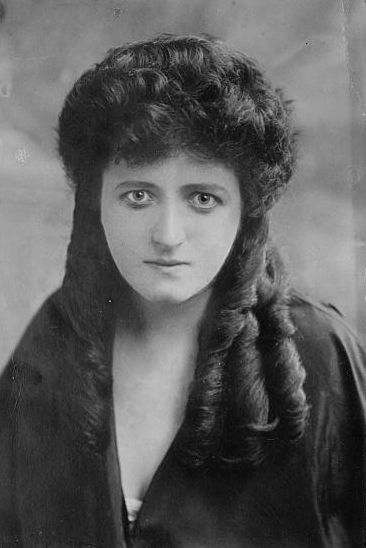
Kühne Beveridge

Actress Louisa Elizabeth Thorn, a native of London, England, was apparently Charles Coghlan's common-law wife for twenty-five years or more and the mother of his daughter Gertrude Coghlan. When in 1893 Coghlan married nineteen-year-old Kühne Beveridge, (Note: Various birthdates are given for her from 1874 to 1878; she was still living as of May 1916 in Munich, Germany) a promising sculptor and aspiring actress from a prominent Illinois family, questions arose about his former marital status. Rose Coghlan soon came to her brother's defense stating she had known for years that Louisa and Charles never legally married. Not long afterwards though, Rose decided to dissolve the business partnership she had with her brother. Upon learning of her father's marriage, an upset Gertrude Coghlan reportedly told the press, "I am Charles Coghlan's adopted daughter and not related to him in any way." Perhaps as an attempt to save his daughter the stigma of an illegitimate birth, Coghlan later supported Gertrude's claim that she was adopted, just not legally through the courts. Within a year of his marriage Coghlan would return to Louisa leaving Beveridge to seek an absolute divorce on the grounds of desertion. A few years later Gertrude joined her father's company playing Juliet in the Broadway production of the Royal Box and afterwards on the road. Gertrude Coghlan, who took to the stage at age sixteen, would go on to have a theatrical career spanning nearly forty years.

The stage actor and director, Charles F. Coghlan (1896–1971), was often thought to be Coghlan's son, in fact he was his nephew, the son of the mezzo-soprano singer Elizabeth "Eily" Coghlan. She died in April 1900 at the age of thirty-six leaving Charles to be adopted by her sister, Rose Coghlan. Charles' father, according to his mother's New York Times obituary, was Sydney Battam or Bratton, a London banker. At the time of his wife's death, Battam was living in London with their twelve-year-old daughter, while four-year-old Charles was with his mother in America. At least one family researcher has made the claim that Charles F. Coghlan was the illegitimate son of Rose Coghlan and her one-time lover the future King Edward VII of England.

== Death ==
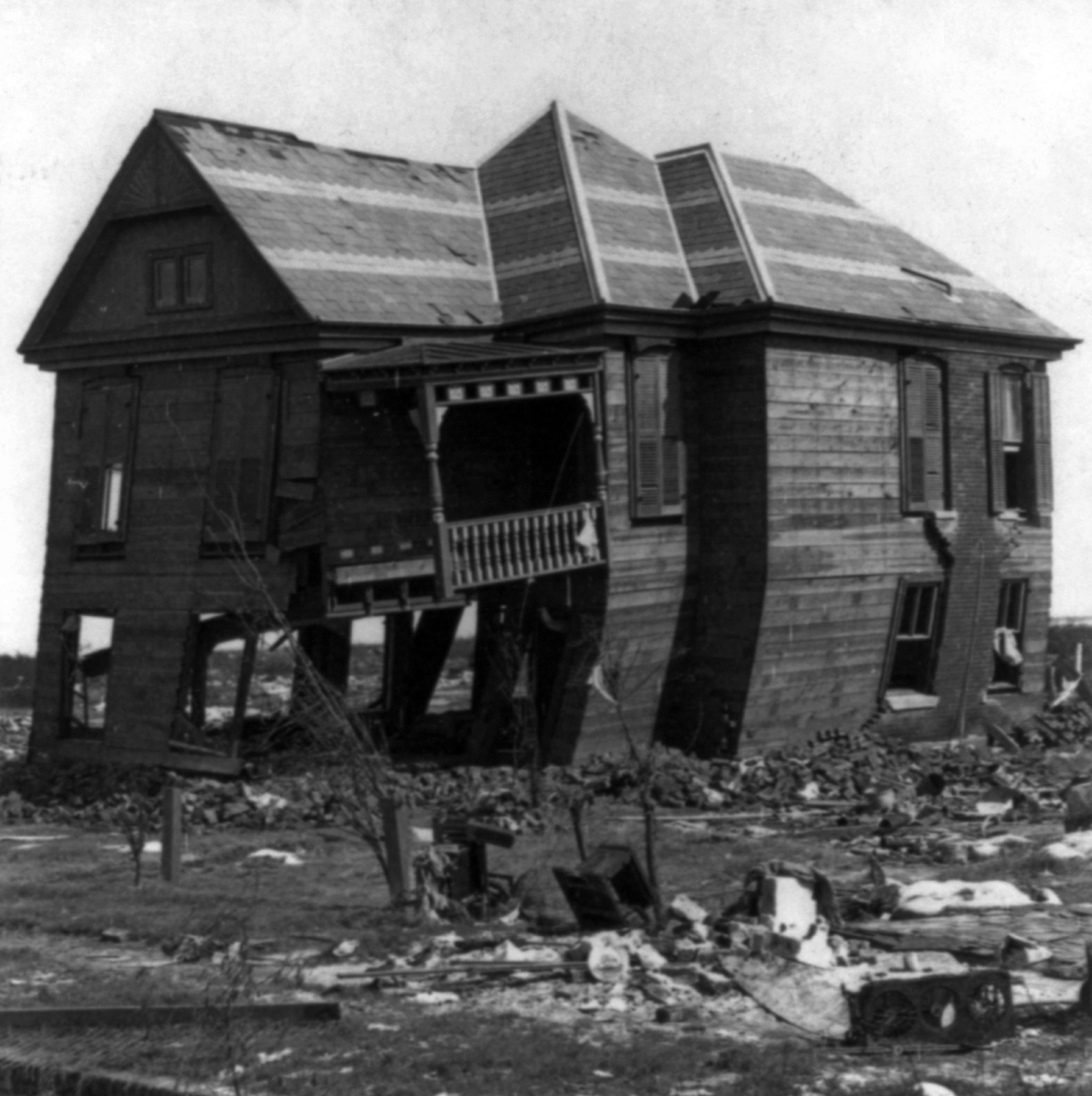
Aftermath of the 1900 Galveston Hurricane

Charles Francis Coghlan died in Galveston, Texas, on 27 November 1899, after a month's illness. He had originally come to the city with his company to perform The Royal Box, but his illness prevented him from ever taking the stage. His body was temporarily placed in a metal casket and stored in a vault at a local cemetery to await further family instructions. At first it was decided his remains would be interred on his farm in Fortune Bridge near the eastern tip of Prince Edward Island. Coghlan had sometime earlier purchased the property as a summer home and for his eventual retirement. Several days after his death, it was announced through the press that his remains would be returned to New York for cremation. Nearly a year later the disposition of the body had yet to be decided and, in the interim, his casket was swept away from its resting place by a storm surge generated from the deadly Galveston Hurricane of 1900. The New York Actors Club had, for several years, a standing reward for anyone who recovered Coghlan's coffin. In January 1904 a metal coffin was found in a marsh; at first it was thought to have been Coghlan's; however it proved to be the remains of a New York man. Coghlan's coffin/remains was eventually found in January 1907 by a group of hunters who discovered it partially submerged in a marsh some nine miles from Galveston along the east coast of mainland Texas.

Years after his death and the recovery of his body, a story arose that Coghlan's metal casket had been recovered in 1907, not far from his Prince Edward Island proper, by a group of Canadian fishermen in the Gulf of Saint Lawrence, after drifting some two thousand miles along the East Coast of North America. A skeptic referred to Coghlan's casket as the "homing coffin". The earliest published version of the story comes from Coghlan's fellow actor Johnston Forbes-Robertson's 1925 book, A Player under Three Reigns. It was repeated in a 1929 Ripley's Believe It or Not! column. The 1907 news reports of the recovery of his coffin/remains do not tell of the disposition of his remains; he was certainly not reburied on Prince Edward Island.

According to his entry in Appletons' Annual Cyclopaedia and Register of Important Events of 1899:

The words that were written in 1790 of his kinsman, the MacCoghlan, last Lord of Delvin-Ara, well describe Charles Coghlan: "He was a remarkably handsome man, gallant, eccentric, proud, satirical, hospitable in the extreme, and of expensive habits." A contemporary American critic thus summed up his excellence as an actor in 1879: "It is to the complete and perfect forgetting of self in his performance that the high esteem in which Mr. Coghlan is held by the thinking audience is due. He never descends to the cheap creating of effects; he plays his part for all it is worth; he does not play Charles Coghlan, with the kind assistance of somebody's text, for the amusement of his friends and admirers.

== Plays by Charles Coghlan ==
List of plays written or adapted by Charles Francis Coghlan.

- Love and Hate, or The Court of Charles I (1858) privately published
- Good as Gold (1869)
- Lady Flora (1876), originally titled Her Own Choice, a Comedy.
- The House of Darnley (1877) – wrote the last act of the uncompleted play by Lord Lytton.
- For Life (1877 in America), adaptation of the French play Morte Civile.
- Jocelyn (1889) starring Rose Coghlan.
- Lady Barter (1891) starring Lillie Langtry
- The Check Book (1894) starring Rose Coghlan.
- A Quiet Rubber (1876), adaptation of Une Partie de Piquet,
- The Royal Box (1898), adaptation of the Dumas' play Kean
- Citizen Pierre (1899)

== In popular culture ==
He was the namesake of a song by Dutch symphonic black/horror metal band Carach Angren, who have also a music video released to showcase his untimely demise and events thereafter.
