= John Early (Illinois politician) =

Canadian politician

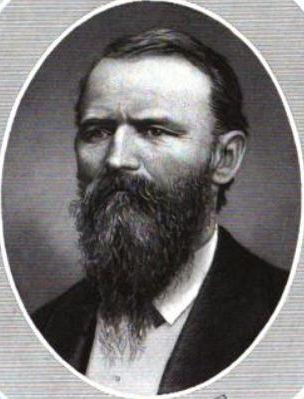

19th Lieutenant Governor of Illinois
- In office January 23, 1873 – January 8, 1875
- Governor: John Lourie Beveridge
- Preceded by: John Lourie Beveridge
- Succeeded by: Archibald Glenn

Member of the Illinois Senate
- In office 1870-1872

Personal details
- Born: March 17, 1828 Essex County, Upper Canada
- Died: September 2, 1877 (aged 49) Rockford, Illinois
- Party: Republican
- Profession: Carpenter

John Early (March 17, 1828 – September 2, 1877) was a Canadian American politician. Coming to Rockford, Illinois, to practice carpentry, Early rose to become an agent for the New England Mutual Life Insurance Company. A staunch abolitionist, Early was an early supporter of the Republican Party and was voted to the Illinois Senate on the ticket four times. During one of these terms, he was elected President of the Illinois Senate, thus acting Lieutenant Governor of Illinois. Early died before his fourth term was completed.

== Biography ==
John Early was born in Essex County, Ontario, on March 17, 1828. He attended public schools and helped his family on the farm. When he was eighteen, he came with his family to Caledonia, Illinois, United States. In 1852, he moved to Rockford to work as a carpenter. He became a noted architectural draftsman and the New England Mutual Life Insurance Company hired him as a general agent. Early became active in politics, led by his abolitionist views, supporting the Free Soil Party. He joined the Republican Party when it formed a few years later.

Early was elected assessor of the City of Rockford three times. In 1869, Illinois Governor John M. Palmer appointed early one of the original trustees of the Reform School at Pontiac, a position he held for one year. In 1870, he was elected to the Illinois Senate for a two-year term. He was re-elected in the next three elections. Shortly after his election as governor in 1873, Richard J. Oglesby was appointed to the United States Senate, making Lieutenant Governor of Illinois John Lourie Beveridge the acting governor. Early was elected to replace Beveridge as acting lieutenant governor (thus President of the Illinois Senate), holding the position from January 23, 1873, to January 8, 1875. Early died from complications of tuberculosis on September 2, 1877, before his fourth Senate term ended. He was buried in Cedar Bluff Cemetery in Rockford.

Political offices
Preceded by John Lourie Beveridge	Lieutenant Governor of Illinois; 1873–1875	Succeeded by Archibald Glenn
