= Kühne Beveridge =

American sculptor

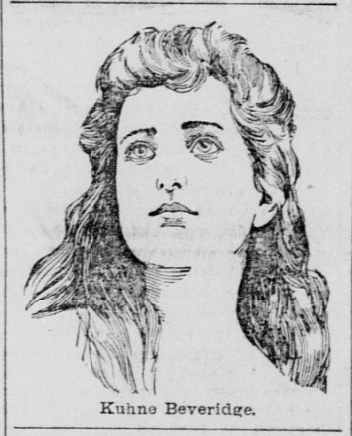
Sketch of Kuhne Beveridge

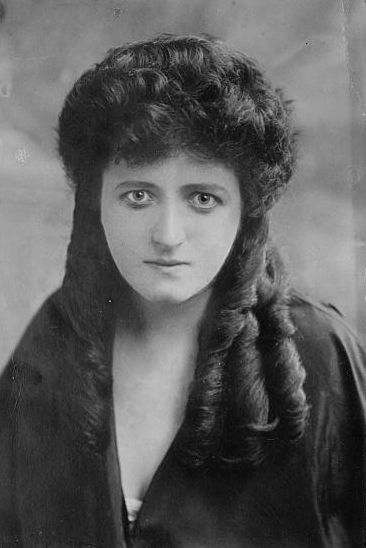
Kühne Beveridge

Kühne Beveridge Branson (31 October 1874 – 2 November 1944) was an American sculptor.

== Biography ==
She was born in Springfield, Illinois, the daughter of Philo Judson Beveridge and Ella Rutzer, and the granddaughter of the 16th Governor of Illinois John L. Beveridge. She studied under William R. O'Donovan in New York City, and under Rodin in Paris. Among her works are a statue called Rhodesia, Rough Rider Monument, a statue called Lascire, which belongs to Dr. Jameson, busts of Cecil Rhodes, King Edward VII, Grover Cleveland, Adlai Stevenson, Joseph Jefferson, Buffalo Bill, Bryan Mahon, Tom L. Johnson, and many others. Beveridge was first noticed as an artist in the US in 1892, when her busts of former President Cleveland and Jefferson called favorable attention to her.

In 1893, she married actor Charles Francis Coghlan, who was nearly 40 years older than her. She soon discovered that he had a living common-law wife at the time of her marriage and obtained a divorce for desertion when Coghlan returned to live with the woman. Before she went to South Africa, Beveridge had executed several commissions for Cecil Rhodes and others living in that region. Beveridge received an Honorable Mention in the 1900 Paris Exposition. With the help of her mother, she also made a statue The Veiled Venus for the Paris Exposition, which was awarded a bronze medal at the Paris Salon and was placed in Leeds Museum, England She also made San Francisco weeping at the Golden Gate for the San Francisco Golden Gate Park.

In 1903 in London, Beveridge married a second time to William B. Branson,[1873-1936] an American who resided at Johannesburg, in the Transvaal.

In 1910, under her maiden name, she exhibited in Leipzig, Germany, a sculpture of man and woman called "The Vampire" [the exploitation of woman by man]. In 1913, Beveridge was a resident of Mayfair, London England In 1914, her sister Ray Beveridge, an actress, was divorced from her husband Irving Seliger. In February 1916, Beveridge was interviewed in her Munich, Germany studio. In May 1916, she was still at her Munich Studio. In June 1930, she was selected as a member of the Illinois Hall of Fame.

During the Second World War, Beveridge resided in Nazi Germany. She died of a stroke in the spa town Bad Salzbrunn (now Szczawno-Zdrój, Poland), in 1944. She was buried in Wałbrzych.
