= Halver Halversen =

American jeweler

Halver “Hal” Halversen was born in 1876 in Winona, Minnesota. After growing up in Minnesota, he moved to Iowa where he worked for several years. Halverson then became a traveling jewelry auctioneer, before moving to North Carolina where he owned a jewelry store. Halverson was interviewed by the Federal Writer's Project in 1939.

== Biography ==
=== Early life ===
Halver Halversen was born to Norwegian immigrants in Winona, Minnesota in 1876. His parents emigrated from Molde, Norway and came to America in 1867. Hal was the sixth of ten children. While growing up in Minnesota, he was taught watchmaking by his father in his father's shop. As a child and young adult Halversen worked at his father's shop and then worked on his brother's shop when his brother opened a jewelry store.

=== Life after Minnesota ===
In 1893, Halversen took a boat trip down the Mississippi River to Muscatine, Iowa with his brother and his father. When his father and brother went back to Minnesota, Halverson stayed in Iowa. For four years he worked as a motion picture operator and then went on to operate ten wholesale grocery stores. After these jobs he became a traveling jewelry auctioneer. For fifteen years he was an auctioneer until his health failed. He then decided to move to North Carolina where he believed the climate to be suitable to his health. In North Carolina he started a jewelry store which made repairs and manufactured custom jewelry. His store was called the “Expert Watchmaker.”

=== Family life ===
In 1902 Halversen married a lady with parents from England. The couple had three daughters. Halverson's first daughter was the first member of his family to receive a college education. Two of his daughters became artists for the Walt Disney Studio.

== Social issues ==
=== Immigration ===
Halversen did not face many problems with immigration, but many immigrants at the time such as Halverson's parents were persecuted in America during the early twentieth century. During this time religious persecution, poor economic times, and other factors influenced Europeans to immigrate to America. In the case of Halversen's parents, they were looking for better economic fortune. Many of the people who emigrated from Scandinavia were from the lower classes with the “desire for material betterment.”(Stephenson) This phenomenon for many immigrants at the time who saw America as the land of fortune was called “American Fever.”(Stephenson)

== Federal Writer's Project ==
The Federal writer's Project was a project funded by the federal government through the Works Progress Administration (WPA). The project, founded in 1935, was intended to “provide work relief for writers and to develop writing and research projects.”(Mullen). As a result of the project, the FWP was able to document American folklore and oral history on a large scale for the first time. The project also created guidebooks to different regions of the country. Notable authors include the famous novelist Ralph Ellison. An important aspect of this project was to give an unbiased voice and sound to all different types of people in the United States. While it was meant to be unbiased, several cases indicate that the author was not.

== Sources ==
- Bell, John L. Hard Times : Beginnings of the Great Depression in North Carolina, 1929-1933. Raleigh: North Carolina Dept. of Cultural Resources, Division of Archives and History, 1982. Print.
- Fenn, Elizabeth A. The Way We Lived In North Carolina. Chapel Hill: University of North Carolina Press, 2003. Print.
- Billington, Monroe L. The South: A Central Theme?. Holt, Rinehart, and Winston, Inc., 1969. Print
- "U.S. Department of Labor -- Brief History of DOL - The 1920s and the Start of the Depression, 1921-1933." U.S. Department of Labor—Brief History of DOL - The 1920s and the Start of the Depression, 1921-1933. N.p., n.d. Web. November 12, 2012. <>
- v“Collection Overview.” Federal Writers’ Project Papers, 1936-1940. The Southern Historical Collection, April 2010. Web. http://www.lib.unc.edu/mss/inv/f/Federal_Writers'Project.html#d2e5399. November 12, 2012
- Mullen, Bill. "Federal Writer's Project (FWP)."Encyclopedia of the Great Depression. 1. New York: 2004. <http://go.galegroup.com/ps/i.do?action=interpret&id=GALE%7CCX3404500198&v=2.1&u=unc_main&it=r&p=GVRL&sw=w&authCount=1>
- Stephenson, George. A History of American Immigration, 1820-1924. 1st ed. Boston: Ginn and company, 1926. Web. <http://babel.hathitrust.org/cgi/pt?u=1&num=1&seq=50&view=image&size=100&id=mdp.39015005063527>.
