= John Dougherty (Illinois politician) =

American politician (1806–1879)

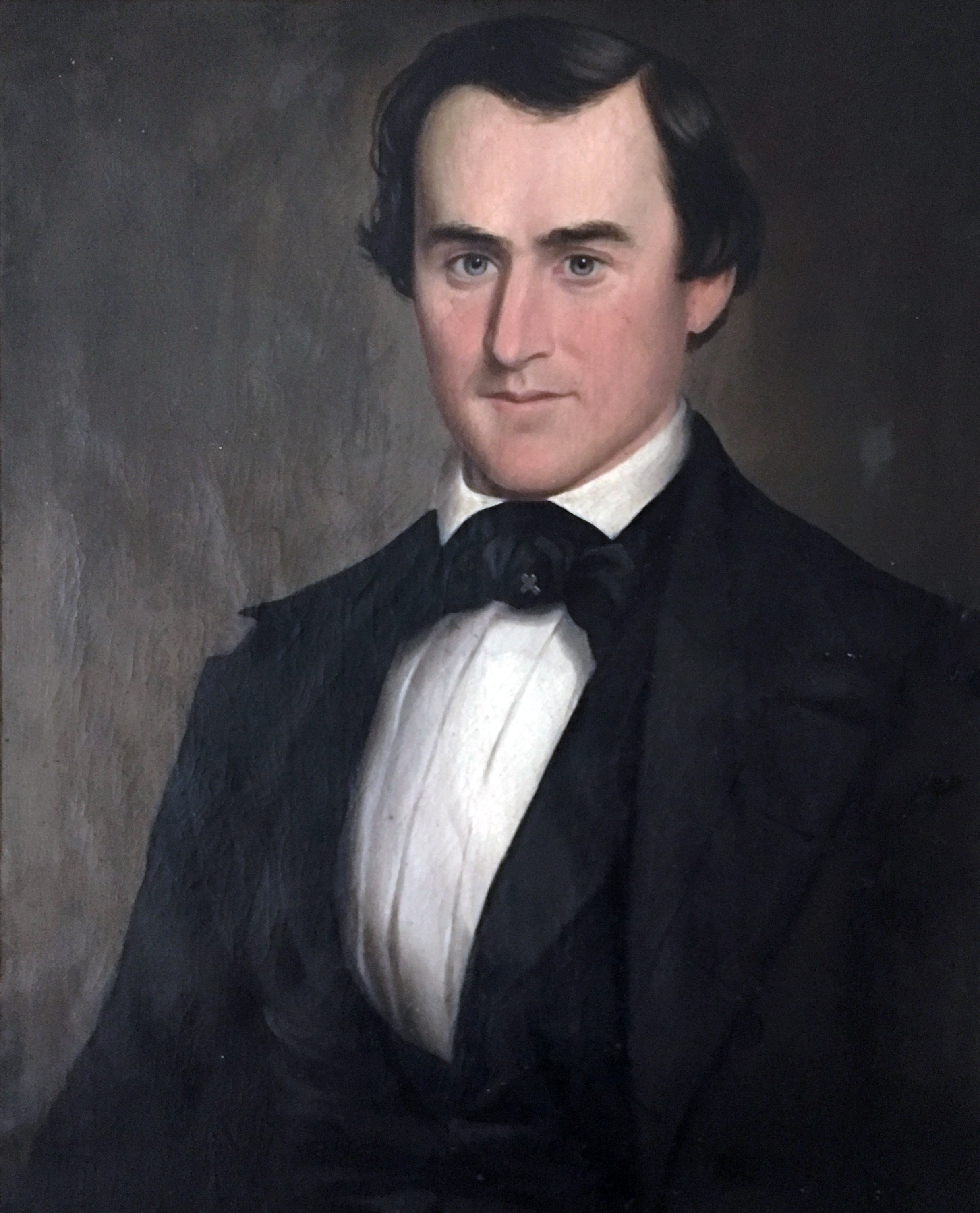
Painting of Lt. Governor John Dougherty

John Dougherty (May 6, 1806 – September 7, 1879) was an American politician from Illinois. After a stint mining and teaching, Dougherty became an understudy of Alexander Pope Field and was admitted to the bar. He served several terms in both the Illinois House of Representatives and the Illinois Senate over the next twenty years. In 1868, he was elected Lieutenant Governor of Illinois.

== Biography ==
John Dougherty was born in Duck Creek, Ohio, near Marietta in what is today Fearing Township, on May 6, 1806. He was the 4th child of Irish immigrant Charles Daugherty/Dougherty and Elizabeth Wolfe of Lancaster, Pennsylvania. When he was two, his family moved to Cape Girardeau, Louisiana Territory. His mother was soon widowed, and she took the family to Union County, Illinois Territory, after the New Madrid earthquakes. Dougherty attended public schools there until reaching adulthood. He took a job in the lead mines of Washington County, Missouri. After a year, he started to teach at a school in Fredericktown, Missouri, where he taught for two and a half years. Dougherty returned to Union County, Illinois, in 1829.

After struggling to find a job, Alexander Pope Field offered Dougherty the opportunity to study law in his office. Dougherty was admitted to the bar in 1831. The next year, he was elected to the Illinois House of Representatives for a two-year term. Dougherty was re-elected two years later, although he had to resign before the term was complete. However, he returned in 1836 for another term. Dougherty was elected again in 1840, then was elected to the Illinois Senate in 1842. He served in the upper house for six years. He advocated for free schools, financial reform, and canal funding.

Dougherty returned to the House in 1856 for another two years. Although in an area largely sympathetic to the Democratic Party, Dougherty joined the Republican Party prior to the start of the Civil War. Dougherty helped to raise volunteers for the Union from Southern Illinois. In 1864, Dougherty was named a presidential elector after his efforts canvassing the state. He was nominated as Lieutenant Governor of Illinois in 1868 on a ticket with John M. Palmer and was elected. He again served as presidential elector in 1872. He ran for circuit court judge and was elected in 1877, serving until his death.

Dougherty married Katherine James on March 5, 1829. They had ten children, although three died in infancy. Eldest son William La Fayette served as a United States Marshal. Alexander N. worked as a lawyer, George M. worked for the Illinois Central Railroad, and John J. served in the United States Army. Dougherty died on September 7, 1879.

== See also ==
- Ku Klux Klan in Southern Illinois, for the 1872 lynching of his first cousin, Isaac Vancil

Party political offices
Preceded by William Bross	Republican nominee for Lieutenant Governor of Illinois; 1868	Succeeded by John Lourie Beveridge
Political offices
Preceded by William Bross	Lieutenant Governor of Illinois; 1869-1873	Succeeded by John Lourie Beveridge
