= Rose Coghlan =

English actress

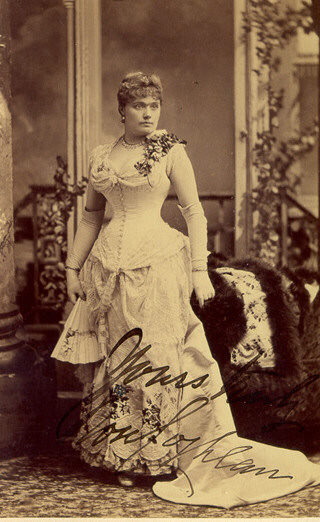
Rose Coghlan, 1884

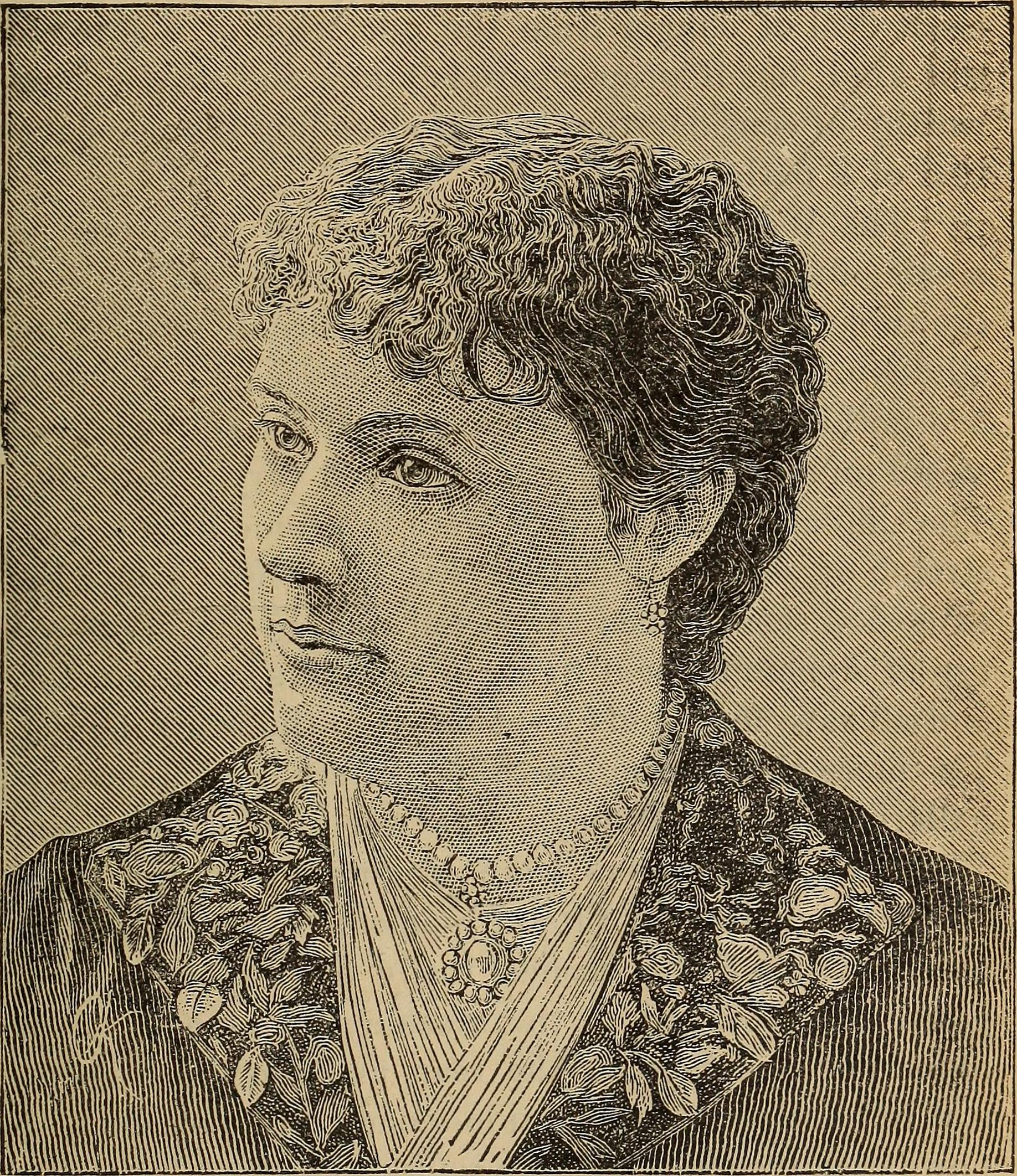
Litograph of Rose Coghlan, c.1893

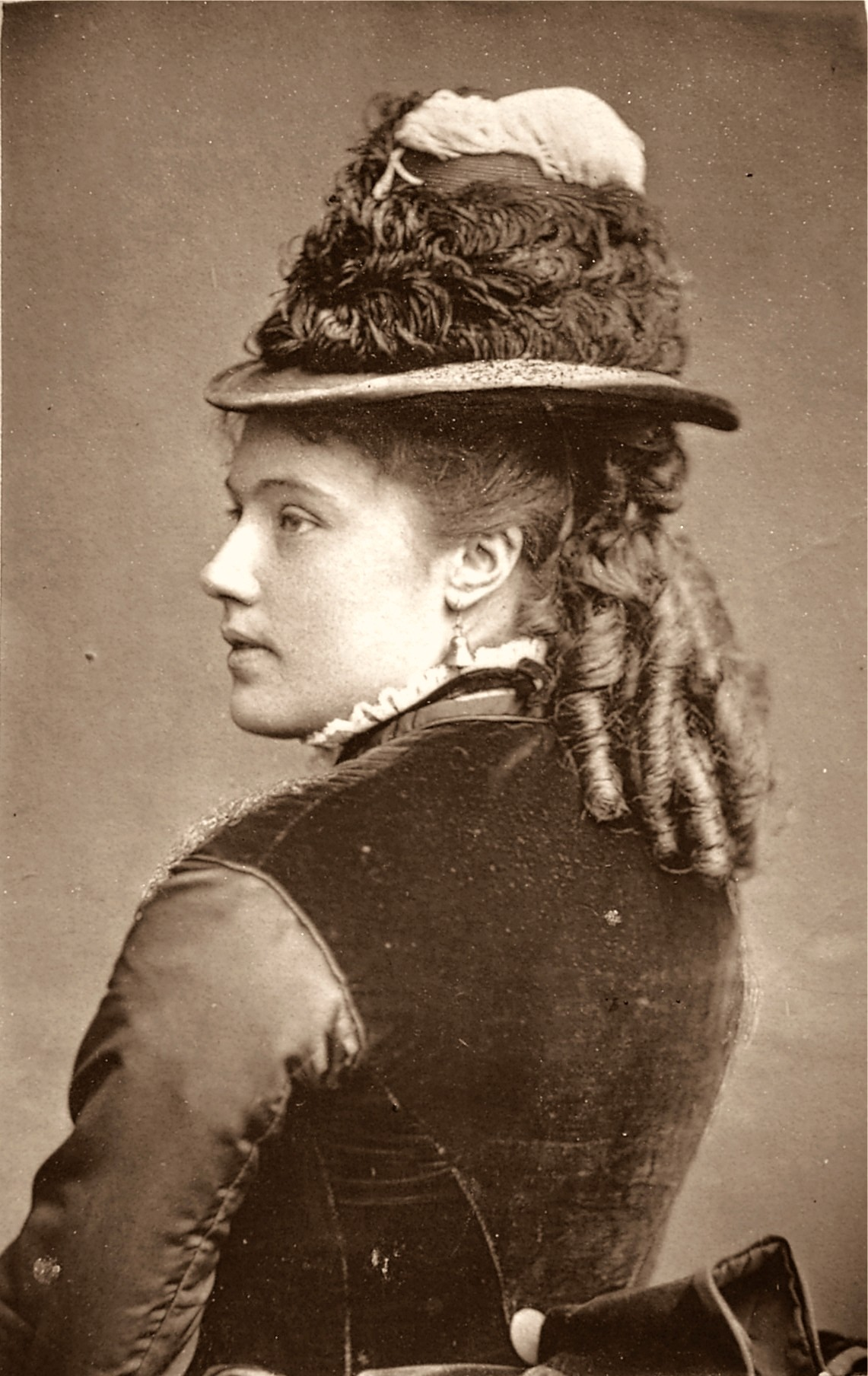
Rose Coghlan, 1870s

Rosamond Marie Coghlan (March 18, 1851 – April 2, 1932) was an English actress.

== Biography ==
Rosamond Marie Coghlan was born in Peterborough, England, to author Francis Coghlan, and Anna Marie, née Kirby. Her elder brother (or half-brother) was the actor Charles Francis Coghlan. Her niece was Gertrude Coghlan. Rose went to America in 1871 as part of Lydia Thompson's troupe touring the U.S.. She made her Broadway debut in 1872 in a musical. Coghlan was again in England from 1873 to 1877, playing with Barry Sullivan, and then returned to America. She became prominent as Countess Zicka in Diplomacy, and Stephanie in Forget-me-not. She was at Wallack's almost continuously until 1888, and subsequently appeared in melodrama in parts like the title-role of The Sporting Duchess.

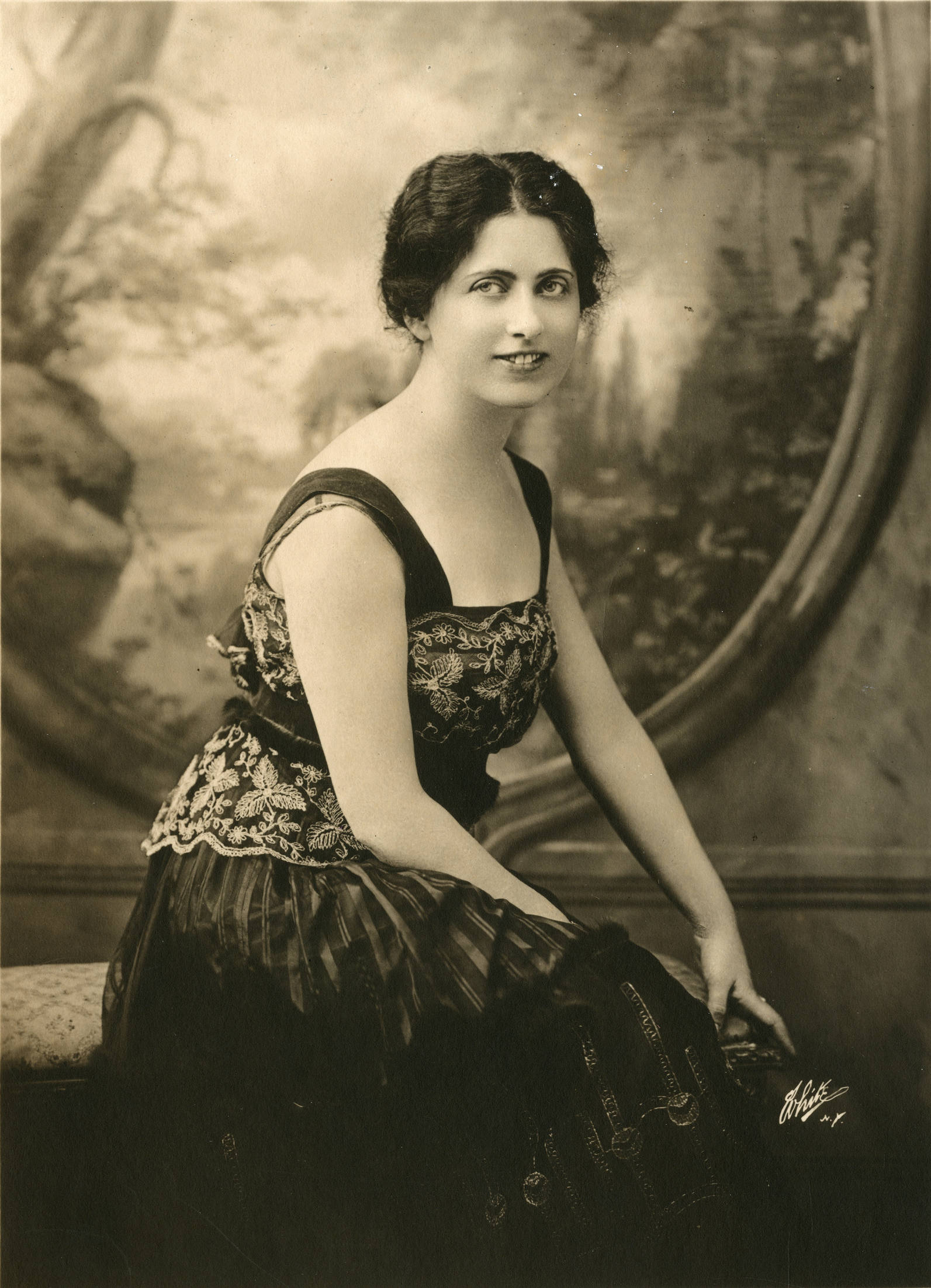
Rosalind Goghlan, daughter

Following the 1899 death of her brother, Charles Coghlan, in 1901 Rose appeared at Denver, Colorado's, Elitch Theatre in the world premiere of her brother's play, Fortune's Bridge. Rose stated that "my particular reason for coming to Denver was to produce my brother's play -- the one he finished just before his death. It's called Fortune's Bridge, but he didn't give it the name." Rose explained that the manuscript was sent to a typist and at the end her brother signed it and added his Canadian address: "Charles Coghlan, Fortune Bridge." Apparently the typist moved it to the head of the first page and typed, "Fortune's Bridge, by Charles Coghlan." Rose stated "the name seemed to fit the play so well I allowed it to stand."

Coghlan died in Harrison, New York two weeks past her 81st birthday. She had been married twice first to Clinton J. Edgerly from 1885 to 1890 and second to John T. Sullivan from 1890 to 1893. She had two children, an adopted daughter and a son.

== Filmography ==
- As You Like It (1912)
- The Eavesdropper (1912) (*short)
- The Sporting Duchess (1915)
- Thou Shalt Not Kill (1915)
- The Faded Flower (1916)
- Her Surrender (1916)
- Beyond the Rainbow (1922)
- The Secrets of Paris (1922)
- Under the Red Robe (1923)
