= Andrew Shuman =

American newspaper editor and politician

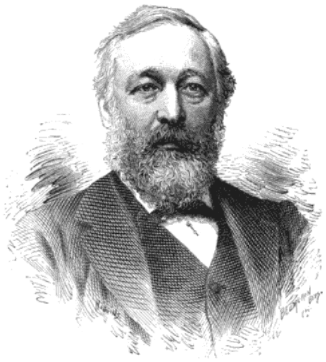

21st Lieutenant Governor of Illinois
- In office January 8, 1877 – January 10, 1881
- Governor: Shelby Moore Cullom
- Preceded by: Archibald Glenn
- Succeeded by: John Marshall Hamilton

Personal details
- Born: November 8, 1830 Manor, Lancaster County, Pennsylvania
- Died: May 5, 1890 (aged 59) Chicago, Illinois
- Resting place: Rosehill Cemetery
- Party: Republican
- Spouse: Lucy H. Dunlap
- Profession: newspaper editor

Andrew Shuman (November 8, 1830 – May 5, 1890) was an American newspaper editor and politician. A native of New York, Shuman worked at several small local newspapers until he secured a position at the Syracuse Journal in 1853. He left the position in 1856 to work as an assistant editor for the Chicago Evening Journal, a predecessor of the Chicago Sun-Times. He was elected the 21st Lieutenant Governor of Illinois in 1876. A leading candidate for the Illinois governorship in 1880, Shuman instead decided to increase his role at the Evening Journal and retired from politics.

== Biography ==
Andrew Shuman was born in Manor, Lancaster County, Pennsylvania on November 8, 1830. His father died when he was seven years old and Shuman was left in the care of his uncle. When he was fifteen years old, Shuman took an apprenticeship with the Lancaster Union and Sentinel. He followed the newspaper when operations were moved to Auburn, New York and it was renamed the Auburn Advertiser. Shuman left the paper when he was eighteen to start his own, the Auburnian. A year later, he became a partner at the Cayuga Chief, a widely circulated weekly newspaper.

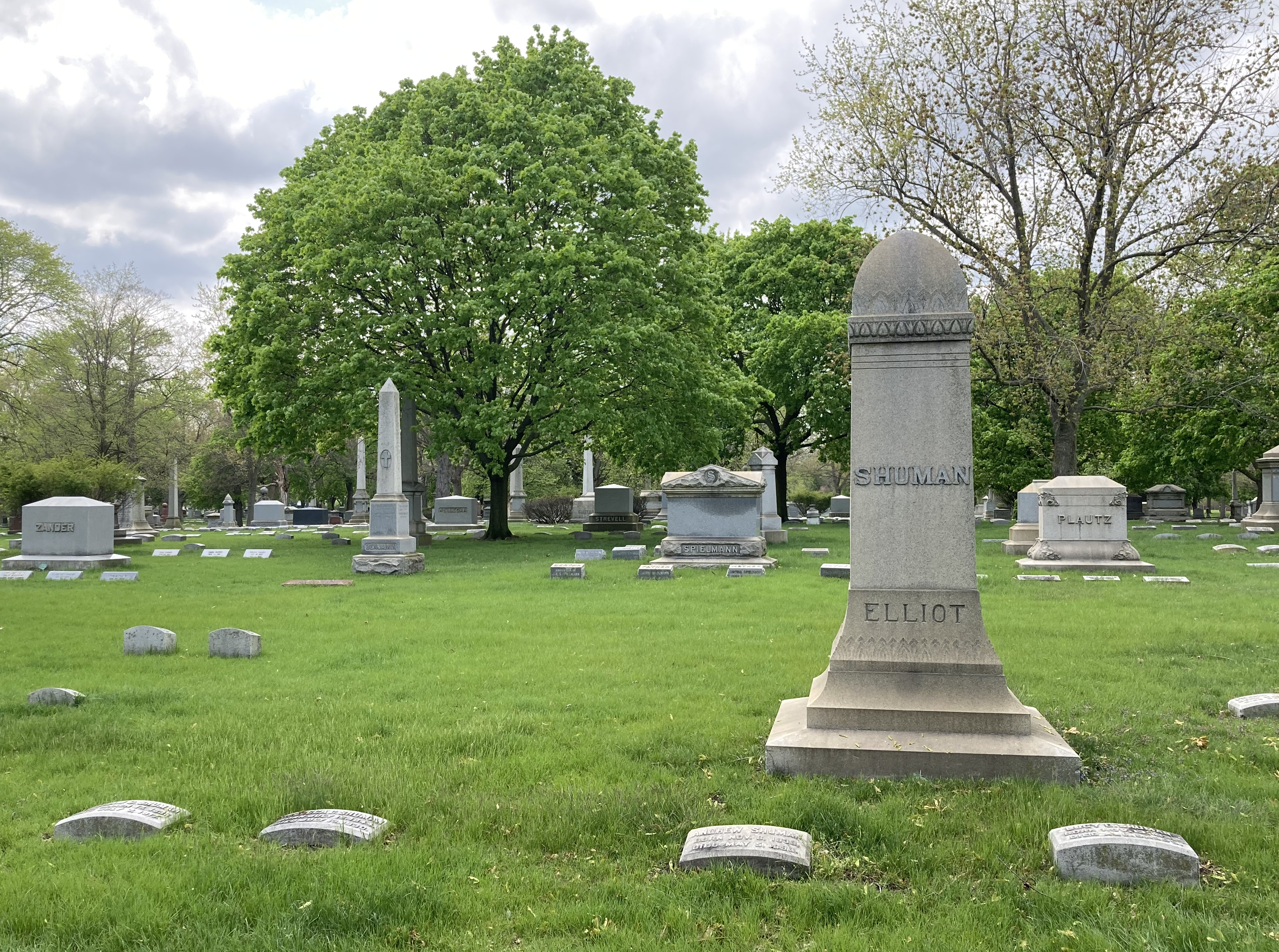
Shuman's grave at Rosehill Cemetery

Shuman attended Hamilton College in Clinton from 1851 to 1853. He left the college to become an editor for the Syracuse Journal. The newspaper had a reputation as one of the strongest Republican papers in the state of New York. He worked there for three years, whereupon he took a position as assistant editor at the Chicago Evening Journal in Chicago, Illinois. He rose to the position of editor-in-chief. He married Lucy H. Dunlap in 1855. In 1865, Shuman was appointed Illinois Penitentiary commissioner, a role he served for six years.

In 1876, Shuman was elected Lieutenant Governor of Illinois as a Republican on a ticket with Shelby Moore Cullom. Shuman was a candidate for Governor of Illinois in 1880, running against Cullom. However, before a candidate was nominated, Shuman withdrew from the race to assume the role of proprietor of the Evening Journal. Shuman retired in 1888 over concerns about his health; he died of heart disease at a hotel in Chicago on May 5, 1890. He was buried at Rosehill Cemetery in Chicago.

Party political offices
| Preceded by John Lourie Beveridge | Republican nominee for Lieutenant Governor of Illinois; 1876 | Succeeded by John Marshall Hamilton |
Political offices
| Preceded by Archibald Glenn | Lieutenant Governor of Illinois; 1877–1881 | Succeeded by John Marshall Hamilton |
