= John Lourie Beveridge =

American politician (1824–1910)

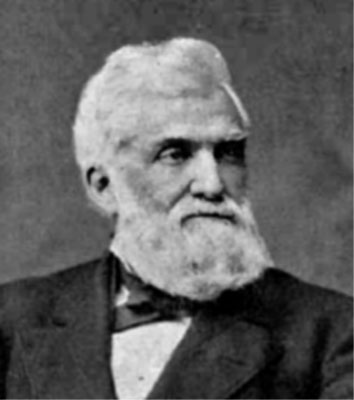

16th Governor of Illinois
- In office January 23, 1873 – January 8, 1877
- Lieutenant: John Early; Archibald Glenn
- Preceded by: Richard J. Oglesby
- Succeeded by: Shelby Moore Cullom

18th Lieutenant Governor of Illinois
- In office January 13, 1873 – January 23, 1873
- Governor: Richard J. Oglesby
- Preceded by: Richard J. Oglesby
- Succeeded by: John Early

Member of the U.S. House of Representatives from Illinois's 3rd congressional district
- In office November 4, 1871 – January 4, 1873
- Preceded by: John A. Logan
- Succeeded by: District eliminated

Cook County Sheriff
- In office 1864–1870

Personal details
- Born: July 6, 1824 Greenwich, New York, US
- Died: May 3, 1910 (aged 85) Los Angeles, California, US
- Party: Republican
- Profession: lawyer

Military service
- Allegiance: United States; Union
- Branch/service: Union Army
- Years of service: 1861–1866
- Rank: Colonel; Bvt. Brigadier General
- Unit: 8th Illinois Cavalry Regiment
- Commands: 17th Illinois Cavalry
- Battles/wars: American Civil War

John Lourie Beveridge (July 6, 1824 – May 3, 1910) was the 16th governor of Illinois, serving from 1873 to 1877. He succeeded the recently elected Richard J. Oglesby, who resigned to accept a Senate seat. Beveridge previously served in the Army during the American Civil War, becoming colonel of the 17th Illinois Cavalry in 1864. He was brevetted to brigadier general in March 1865.

== Biography ==
John Lourie Beveridge was born in Greenwich, New York, on July 6, 1824, the son of Ann (Hoy) and George Beveridge. In 1842, he moved with his family to DeKalb County, Illinois. Beveridge attended Granville Academy for one term and then studied at Rock River Seminary. After his schooling, he moved to Tennessee and taught school. In 1851, Beveridge returned to Illinois to study law in Sycamore. Three years later, he moved to Evanston and began to practice law in Chicago. He formed a partnership with John F. Farnsworth until the Civil War.

Volunteering for the civil war; Beveridge initially served as an officer with Farnsworth in the 8th Regiment Illinois Volunteer Cavalry. With the unit he fought at Fredericksburg, Chancellorsville and Gettysburg, commanding it at the latter. In November 1863, he received approval to raise his own regiment, the 17th Illinois Volunteer Cavalry, and was elevated to the rank of colonel. The unit saw service in Missouri. He was brevetted to Brigadier General in March 1865 and mustered out on February 6, 1866.

Upon returning home, Beveridge was elected to serve as Cook County Sheriff. In 1870, Beveridge was elected to the Illinois Senate as a Republican. The next year, Beveridge was elected to fill the vacancy in the United States House of Representatives caused by the resignation of John A. Logan. He served in this role for only a year as well, resigning to accept his election as Lieutenant Governor of Illinois. The next year, upon the resignation of Richard J. Oglesby, Beveridge became Governor of Illinois.

The governorship of Beveridge saw the economic downturn from the Long Depression. The farmers' movement prompted the formation of the Anti-Monopolist Party, later known as the Greenback Party, which opposed Beveridge's Republicans. Midterm elections in 1874 saw several Greenbacks (with Democratic support) elected to state offices, including Lieutenant Governor Archibald Glenn. The governorship also saw the Revision of 1874, a rewording of the Constitution of Illinois. Beveridge appointed the leadership roles for the Illinois exhibits for the Centennial Exposition. He also approved the Illinois School for the Deaf, Illinois School for the Blind, Illinois Eastern Hospital for the Insane and restorations of the Northern Illinois Hospital and Asylum for the Insane, Illinois Central Hospital for the Insane, Illinois Soldiers' Orphans' Home and Anna State Hospital.

After his term expired, Beveridge was named Assistant United States Treasurer at Chicago by President Chester A. Arthur. Beveridge moved to Hollywood, California, in 1895, where he remained until his death of May 3, 1910. He was interred in Rosehill Cemetery in Chicago. He was the grandfather of sculptor Kuhne Beveridge.

Party political offices
Preceded by John Dougherty	Republican nominee for Lieutenant Governor of Illinois; 1872	Succeeded by Andrew Shuman
U.S. House of Representatives
Preceded by John A. Logan	Member of the U.S. House of Representatives from Illinois's at-large congressional district November 7, 1871 – January 4, 1873	Succeeded by District elections
Political offices
Preceded by John Dougherty	Lieutenant Governor of Illinois; 1873	Succeeded by John Early
Preceded by Richard J. Oglesby	Governor of Illinois; 1873–1877	Succeeded by Shelby Moore Cullom
