= Archibald A. Glenn =

American politician

Archibald Alexander Glenn

20th Lieutenant Governor of Illinois
- In office January 8, 1875 – January 8, 1877
- Governor: John Lourie Beveridge
- Preceded by: John Early
- Succeeded by: Andrew Shuman

Member of the Illinois Senate
- In office 1870-1872

Personal details
- Born: January 30, 1819 Nicholas County, Kentucky
- Died: May 21, 1901 (aged 82) Kansas
- Party: Democratic
- Spouse(s): Lavinia Cooper, Catherine Stricker
- Profession: Justice of the peace

Archibald Alexander Glenn (January 30, 1819 – May 21, 1901) was an American politician from Kentucky. Raised in Indiana, Glenn's father died when he was thirteen and Glenn had to provide for his family. In 1837, he moved to Illinois where he learned the printing trade and became a publisher. He campaigned for Henry Clay in 1844 then became a prominent politician in Brown County, Illinois. He was elected to the Illinois Senate in 1872 and was named its president two years later; this made him the acting Lieutenant Governor of Illinois. After his term, he moved to Wichita, Kansas, where he held several political positions.

== Biography ==
Archibald Alexander Glenn was born in Nicholas County, Kentucky, on January 30, 1819. When he was three, his family moved north to Indiana. In 1832, Glenn's father died and he was forced to forgo his education work on the family farm. When he was eighteen, Glenn moved to Rushville, Illinois, to learn the printing trade. There, he published the Rushville Whig until 1844. During that year's presidential election, Glenn spent most of his life's earnings campaigning for Henry Clay.

After the election, Glenn moved to Ripley, Illinois, where was named a justice of the peace and served as postmaster. He rose to become clerk of the county court and recorder of deeds. Glenn was a delegate to the Illinois constitutional convention of 1862 and served on the State Board of Equalization of Taxes. He also served for four years as the Brown County superintendent of schools. He was elected to the Illinois Senate as a Democrat in 1872 and served two two-year terms. He was elected President of the Illinois Senate for the second term; this made him the acting Lieutenant Governor of Illinois from 1875 to 1877. He would be the last Democrat to hold the position until 1893.

Once his term as Lieutenant Governor was complete in 1878, Glenn moved to Wichita, Kansas. Glenn specialized in pension law and was elected Police Judge in 1881. He served two terms as city treasurer.

Glenn married Lavinia Cooper on February 13, 1851; they had six children, though only two (William C. and Ella) survived to adulthood. Lavinia died on May 28, 1881, and Glenn later married Catherine Stricker on June 9, 1885. Glenn enjoyed studying math, Latin, and Greek in his free time. The family were member of the Disciples of Christ. Glenn died after an illness on May 21, 1901, and was buried in Ripley Cemetery in Ripley.

Political offices
Preceded by John Early	Lieutenant Governor of Illinois; 1875-1877	Succeeded by Andrew Shuman
