= 1931 in the United States =

- Decades: 1910s; 1920s; 1930s; 1940s; 1950s
- See also: History of the United States (1918–1945); Timeline of United States history (1930–1949); List of years in the United States

Events from the year 1931 in the United States.

== Incumbents ==
=== Federal government ===
- President: Herbert Hoover (R-California)
- Vice President: Charles Curtis (R-Kansas)
- Chief Justice: Charles Evans Hughes (New York)
- Speaker of the House of Representatives:

Nicholas Longworth (R-Ohio) (until March 4)
John Nance Garner (D-Texas) (starting December 7)

- Senate Majority Leader: James Eli Watson (R-Indiana)
- Congress: 71st (until March 4), 72nd (starting March 4)

==== State governments ====
Governors and lieutenant governors

=== Governors ===
- Governor of Alabama: Bibb Graves (Democratic) (until January 19), Benjamin M. Miller (Democratic) (starting January 19)
- Governor of Arizona: John Calhoun Phillips (Republican) (until January 5), George W. P. Hunt (Democratic) (starting January 5)
- Governor of Arkansas: Harvey Parnell (Democratic)
- Governor of California: Clement C. Young (Republican) (until January 6), James Rolph Jr. (Republican) (starting January 6)
- Governor of Colorado: Billy Adams (Democratic)
- Governor of Connecticut: John H. Trumbull (Republican) (until January 7), Wilbur Lucius Cross (Democratic) (starting January 7)
- Governor of Delaware: C. Douglass Buck (Republican)
- Governor of Florida: Doyle E. Carlton (Democratic)
- Governor of Georgia: Lamartine G. Hardman (Democratic) (until June 27), Richard Russell Jr. (Democratic) (starting June 27)
- Governor of Idaho: H. C. Baldridge (Republican) (until January 5), C. Ben Ross (Democratic) (until January 5)
- Governor of Illinois: Louis L. Emmerson (Republican)
- Governor of Indiana: Harry G. Leslie (Republican)
- Governor of Iowa: John Hammill (Republican) (until January 15), Daniel Webster Turner (Republican) (starting January 15)
- Governor of Kansas: Clyde M. Reed (Republican) (until January 12), Harry H. Woodring (Democratic) (starting January 12)
- Governor of Kentucky: Flem D. Sampson (Republican) (until December 8), Ruby Laffoon (Democratic) (starting December 8)
- Governor of Louisiana: Huey P. Long (Democratic)
- Governor of Maine: William Tudor Gardiner (Republican)
- Governor of Maryland: Albert C. Ritchie (Democratic)
- Governor of Massachusetts: Frank G. Allen (Republican) (until January 8), Joseph B. Ely (Democratic) (starting January 8)
- Governor of Michigan: Fred W. Green (Republican) (until January 1), Wilber Marion Brucker (Republican) (starting January 1)
- Governor of Minnesota: Theodore Christianson (Republican) (until January 6), Floyd B. Olson (Farmer–Labor) (starting January 6)
- Governor of Mississippi: Theodore G. Bilbo (Democratic)
- Governor of Missouri: Henry S. Caulfield (Republican)
- Governor of Montana: John E. Erickson (Democratic)
- Governor of Nebraska: Arthur J. Weaver (Republican) (until January 8), Charles W. Bryan (Democratic) (starting January 8)
- Governor of Nevada: Fred B. Balzar (Republican)
- Governor of New Hampshire: Charles W. Tobey (Republican) (until January 1), John Gilbert Winant (Republican) (starting January 1)
- Governor of New Jersey: Morgan Foster Larson (Republican)
- Governor of New Mexico: Richard C. Dillon (Republican) (until January 1), Arthur Seligman (Democratic) (starting January 1)
- Governor of New York: Franklin D. Roosevelt (Democratic)
- Governor of North Carolina: Oliver Max Gardner (Democratic)
- Governor of North Dakota: George F. Shafer (Republican)
- Governor of Ohio: Myers Y. Cooper (Republican) (until January 12), George White (Democratic) (starting January 12)
- Governor of Oklahoma: William J. Holloway (Democratic) (until January 1), William H. Murray (Democratic) (starting January 1)
- Governor of Oregon: A. W. Norblad (Republican) (until January 12), Julius L. Meier (Independent) (starting January 12)
- Governor of Pennsylvania: John Stuchell Fisher (Republican) (until January 20), Gifford Pinchot (Republican) (starting January 20)
- Governor of Rhode Island: Norman S. Case (Republican)
- Governor of South Carolina: John Gardiner Richards Jr. (Democratic) (until January 20), Ibra Charles Blackwood (Democratic) (starting January 20)
- Governor of South Dakota: William J. Bulow (Democratic) (until January 6), Warren Green (Republican) (starting January 6)
- Governor of Tennessee: Henry Hollis Horton (Democratic)
- Governor of Texas: Dan Moody (Democratic) (until January 20), Ross S. Sterling (Democratic) (starting January 20)
- Governor of Utah: George Dern (Democratic)
- Governor of Vermont: John E. Weeks (Republican) (until January 8), Stanley C. Wilson (Republican) (starting January 8)
- Governor of Virginia: John Garland Pollard (Democratic)
- Governor of Washington: Roland H. Hartley (Republican)
- Governor of West Virginia: William G. Conley (Republican)
- Governor of Wisconsin: Walter J. Kohler Sr. (Republican) (until January 5), Philip La Follette (Republican) (starting January 5)
- Governor of Wyoming: Frank C. Emerson (Republican) (until February 18), Alonzo M. Clark (Republican) (starting February 18)

=== Lieutenant governors ===
- Lieutenant Governor of Alabama: William C. Davis (Democratic) (until January 19), Hugh D. Merrill (Democratic) (starting January 19)
- Lieutenant Governor of Arkansas: Lee Cazort (Democratic) (until January 12), Lawrence Elery Wilson (Democratic) (starting January 12)
- Lieutenant Governor of California: H.L. Carnahan (Republican) (until January 6), Frank Merriam (Republican) (starting January 6)
- Lieutenant Governor of Colorado: George Milton Corlett (Republican) (until January 13), Edwin C. Johnson (Democratic) (starting January 13)
- Lieutenant Governor of Connecticut: Ernest E. Rogers (Republican) (until January 7), Samuel R. Spencer (Republican) (starting January 7)
- Lieutenant Governor of Delaware: James H. Hazel (Republican)
- Lieutenant Governor of Idaho: O. E. Hailey (Republican) (until January 5), G. P. Mix (Democratic) (starting January 5)
- Lieutenant Governor of Illinois: Fred E. Sterling (Republican)
- Lieutenant Governor of Indiana: Edgar D. Bush (Republican)
- Lieutenant Governor of Iowa: Arch W. McFarlane (Republican)
- Lieutenant Governor of Kansas: Jacob W. Graybill (Republican)
- Lieutenant Governor of Kentucky: James Breathitt Jr. (Democratic) (until December 8), Happy Chandler (Democratic) (starting December 8)
- Lieutenant Governor of Louisiana: Paul N. Cyr (Democratic) (until month and day unknown), Alvin O. King (Democratic) (starting month and day unknown)
- Lieutenant Governor of Massachusetts: William S. Youngman (political party unknown)
- Lieutenant Governor of Michigan: Luren D. Dickinson (Republican)
- Lieutenant Governor of Minnesota: Charles Edward Adams (Republican) (until January 6), Henry M. Arens (Farmer–Labor) (starting January 6)
- Lieutenant Governor of Mississippi: Bidwell Adam (Democratic)
- Lieutenant Governor of Missouri: Edward Henry Winter (Republican)
- Lieutenant Governor of Montana: Frank A. Hazelbaker (Republican)
- Lieutenant Governor of Nebraska: George A. Williams (Republican) (until January 6), Theodore Metcalfe (Republican) (starting January 6)
- Lieutenant Governor of Nevada: Morley Griswold (Republican)
- Lieutenant Governor of New Mexico: vacant (until January 1), Andrew W. Hockenhull (Democratic) (starting January 1)
- Lieutenant Governor of New York: Herbert H. Lehman (Democratic)
- Lieutenant Governor of North Carolina: Richard T. Fountain (Democratic)
- Lieutenant Governor of North Dakota: John W. Carr (Republican)
- Lieutenant Governor of Ohio: John T. Brown (Democratic) (until January 12), William G. Pickrel (Democratic) (starting January 12)
- Lieutenant Governor of Oklahoma: vacant (until January 12), Robert Burns (Democratic) (starting January 12)
- Lieutenant Governor of Pennsylvania: Arthur H. James (Republican) (until January 20), Edward C. Shannon (Republican) (starting January 20)
- Lieutenant Governor of Rhode Island: James G. Connolly (Republican)
- Lieutenant Governor of South Carolina: Thomas Bothwell Butler (Democratic) (until January 5), James O. Sheppard (Democratic) (starting January 20)
- Lieutenant Governor of South Dakota: John T. Grigsby (Democratic) (until January 6), Odell K. Whitney (Republican) (starting January 6)
- Lieutenant Governor of Tennessee:
  - until January: Sam R. Bratton (Democratic)
  - January: Scott Fitzhugh (Democratic)
  - starting January: Ambrose B. Broadbent (Democratic)
- Lieutenant Governor of Texas: Barry Miller (Democratic) (until January 20), Edgar E. Witt (Democratic) (starting January 20)
- Lieutenant Governor of Vermont: Stanley C. Wilson (Republican) (until January 7), Benjamin Williams (Republican) (starting January 7)
- Lieutenant Governor of Virginia: James H. Price (Democratic)
- Lieutenant Governor of Washington: John Arthur Gellatly (Republican)
- Lieutenant Governor of Wisconsin: Henry A. Huber (Republican)

== Events ==
=== January ===
- January – The American Federation of Labor's National Committee for Modification of the Volstead Act is formed to work for the repeal of Prohibition in the United States.
- January 2 – South Dakota native Ernest Lawrence invents the cyclotron, used to accelerate particles to study nuclear physics.
- January 3 – Albert Einstein begins doing research at the California Institute of Technology, along with astronomer Edwin Hubble.
- January 6
  - Thomas Edison submits his last patent application.
  - In Chicago, CBMC hosts the first meeting to address a greater purpose for business during The Great Depression; over 800 people attend the meeting, in Chicago's Garrick Theatre.
- January 30 – Charlie Chaplin comedy drama film City Lights receives its public premiere at the Los Angeles Theater with Einstein as guest of honor. Contrary to the current trend in cinema, it is a silent film, but with a score by Chaplin. Critically and commercially successful from the start, it will place consistently in lists of films considered the best of all time.

=== February ===
- Food riots break out in Minneapolis and other parts of the United States.
- February 14 – The original film version of Dracula, with Bela Lugosi, is released in the United States.
- February 20 – California gets the go-ahead by the U.S. Congress to build the San Francisco–Oakland Bay Bridge.

=== March ===
- March 1 – Battleship USS Arizona is placed back in full commission after a refit.
- March 3 – The Star-Spangled Banner is adopted as the United States national anthem.
- March 17 – Nevada legalizes gambling.
- March 25 – The Scottsboro Boys are arrested in Alabama and charged with sexual activity.

=== April ===
- April 1 – Canyon de Chelly National Monument is established.
- April 15 – The Castellemmarese War ends with the assassination of Joe "The Boss" Masseria, briefly leaving Salvatore Maranzano as capo di tutti i capi ("boss of all bosses") and undisputed ruler of the American Mafia. Maranzano is himself assassinated less than 6 months later, leading to the establishment of the Five Families.
- April 18 – Cheverly, Maryland is incorporated.
- April 22 – The U.S., Austria, United Kingdom, Denmark, Germany, Italy and Sweden recognize the Spanish Republic.

=== May ===
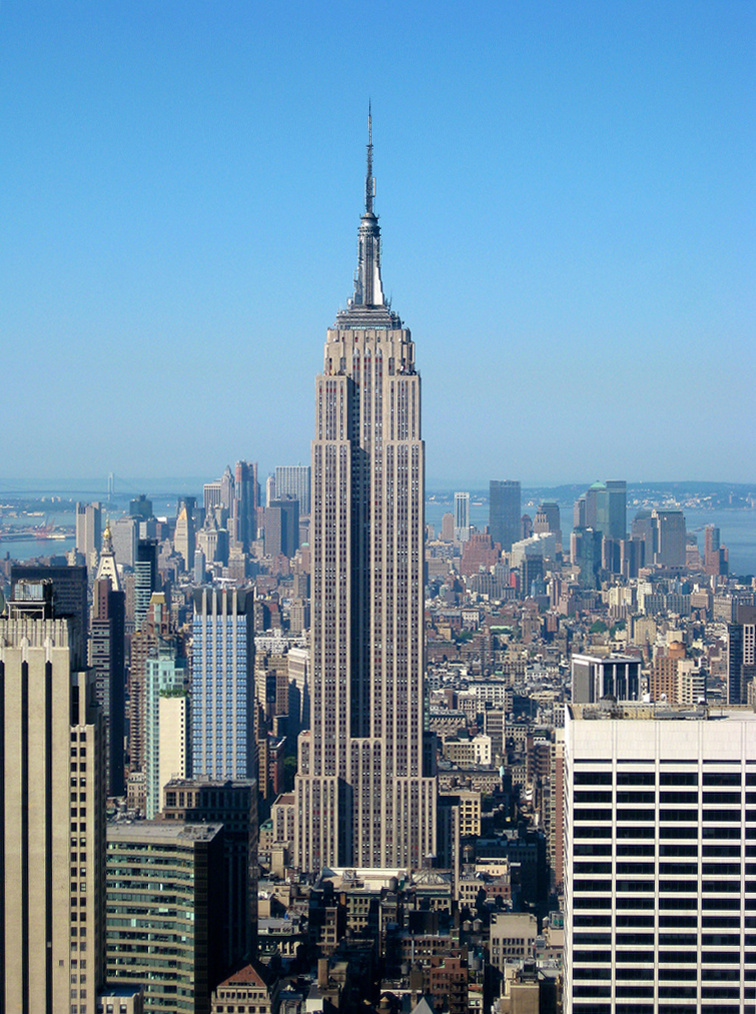
May 1: Empire State Building completed

- May 1 – Construction of the Empire State Building is completed in New York City.
- May 7 – "Siege of West 91st Street": 18-year-old serial murderer Francis "Two Gun" Crowley surrenders after a 2-hour gun battle with New York City Police Department witnessed by 15,000 bystanders.
- May 20 – Lake of the Ozarks completed.

=== June ===
- June 1 – New York City Fire Department Rescue 3 is put in service for service in the Bronx and above 116th Street (Manhattan). Rescue 4 is founded the same day for Queens
- June 19 – In an attempt to stop the banking crisis in Central Europe from causing a worldwide financial meltdown, President Herbert Hoover issues the Hoover Moratorium.
- June 23 – Wiley Post and Harold Gatty take off from Roosevelt Field, Long Island, in an attempt to accomplish the first round-the-world flight in a single-engine plane.

=== July ===
- July – John Haven Emerson of Cambridge, Massachusetts, perfects the Emerson iron lung just in time for the growing polio epidemic.
- July 26 – The International Bible Students Association adopts the name Jehovah's Witnesses at a convention in Columbus, Ohio.

=== August ===
- Warner Brothers releases the first Merrie Melodies cartoon, Lady, Play Your Mandolin.
- August 16 – Texas experiences an earthquake with a moment magnitude of 6.5, the most powerful earthquake in its recorded history.

=== September ===
- September – Construction of Rockefeller Center on Manhattan begins.

=== October ===
- October – The Caltech Department of Physics Faculty and graduate students meet with Albert Einstein as a guest.
- October 4 – Dick Tracy, the comic strip detective character created by cartoonist Chester Gould, makes his first appearance in the Detroit Mirror newspaper.
- October 10 – The St. Louis Cardinals defeat the Philadelphia Athletics, 4 games to 3, to win their second World Series title in baseball.
- October 17 – American gangster Al Capone is sentenced to 11 years in prison for tax evasion in Chicago.
- October 24 – The George Washington Bridge across the Hudson River is dedicated; it opens to traffic the following day. At 3,500 feet (1,100 m), it nearly doubles the previous record for the longest main span in the world.

=== November ===
- November 10 – The 4th Academy Awards, hosted by Lawrence Grant, are presented at Biltmore Hotel in Los Angeles, with William LeBaron's Cimarron winning the Academy Award for Best Picture. The film also receives the most nominations and awards, with seven and three respectively. Norman Taurog wins Best Director for Skippy.
- November 21 – James Whale's film of Frankenstein is released in New York City.
- November 26 – Deuterium is discovered by Harold Urey.

=== December ===
- December 10 – Jane Addams becomes the first American woman to be awarded the Nobel Peace Prize.
- December 26 – Phi Iota Alpha, the oldest surviving Latino fraternity, is founded.
- December – Ess Bee Dress Company is incorporated.

=== Undated ===
- Elizabeth Dilling begins anti-communist activism.
- The Association for Research and Enlightenment, Inc. (ARE) founded in Virginia Beach, Virginia, as an open-membership group to research the collected transcripts of Edgar Cayce's continuing trances, stored at the Edgar Cayce Foundation.

=== Ongoing ===
- Lochner era (c. 1897–c. 1937)
- U.S. occupation of Haiti (1915–1934)
- Prohibition (1920–1933)
- Great Depression (1929–1933)
- Dust Bowl (1930–1936)

== Births ==
=== January ===
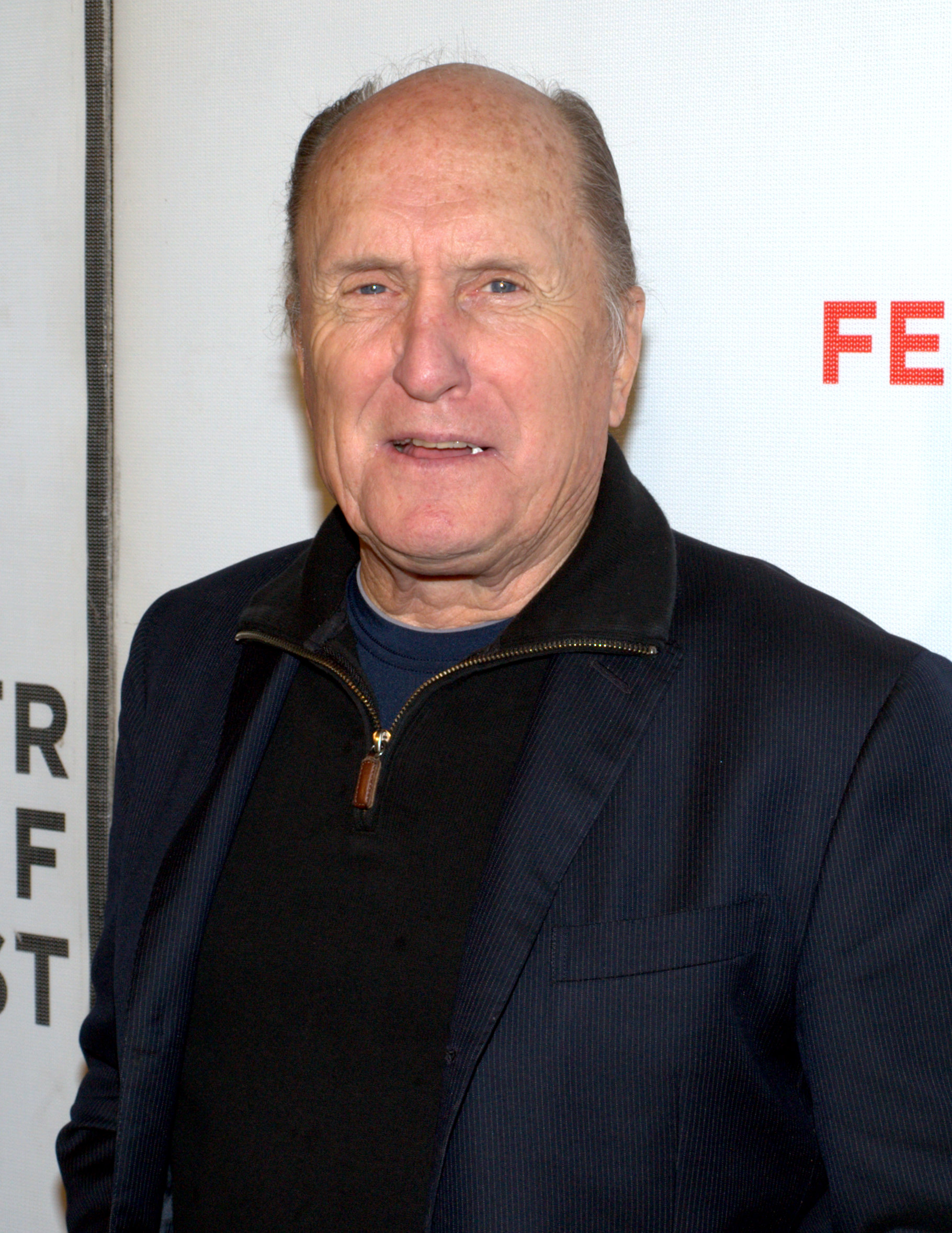
Robert Duvall

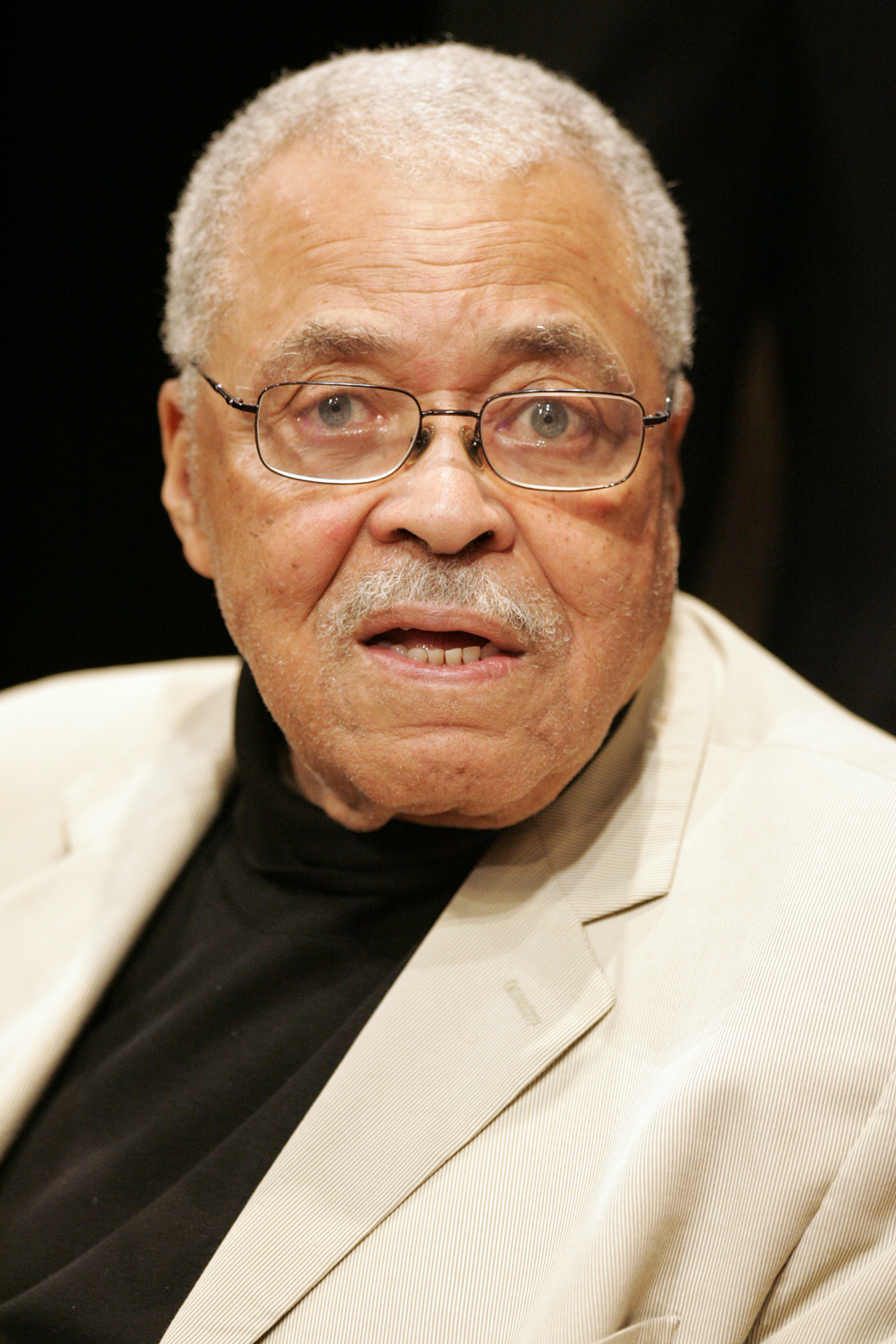
James Earl Jones

- January 1 – Bobbie Nelson, pianist and singer (d. 2022)
- January 5
  - Alvin Ailey, choreographer (d. 1989)
  - Robert Duvall, actor and director (d. 2026)
- January 6
  - Fern Battaglia, baseball player (d. 2001)
  - E. L. Doctorow, novelist (d. 2015)
- January 7 – Mack Mattingly, U.S. Senator from Georgia from 1981 to 1987
- January 10 – Ron Galella, photographer (d. 2022)
- January 16 – Ellen Holly, actress (d. 2023)
- January 17 – James Earl Jones, African-American actor (d. 2024)
- January 20
  - Jack Grinnage, actor
  - Preston Henn, businessman, founder of Fort Lauderdale Swap Shop (d. 2017)
  - David Lee, physicist, recipient of the Nobel Prize in Physics in 1996
- January 22
  - Sam Cooke, African-American singer (d. 1964)
  - Helen Hays, ornithologist and conservationist (d. 2025)
- January 25 – Dean Jones, actor (d. 2015)
- January 27 – Red Bastien, wrestler, trainer and promoter (d. 2012)
- January 29 – Jim Baumer, baseball player and manager (d. 1996)
- January 30 – Allan W. Eckert, historian, naturalist, and author (d. 2011)
- January 31
  - Ernie Banks, African-American baseball player (d. 2015)
  - Jack Taylor, swimmer (d. 1955)

=== February ===
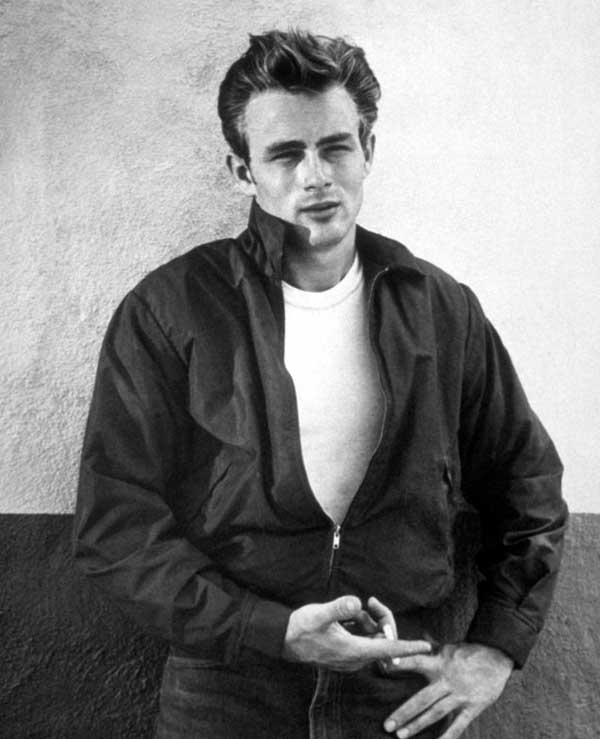
James Dean

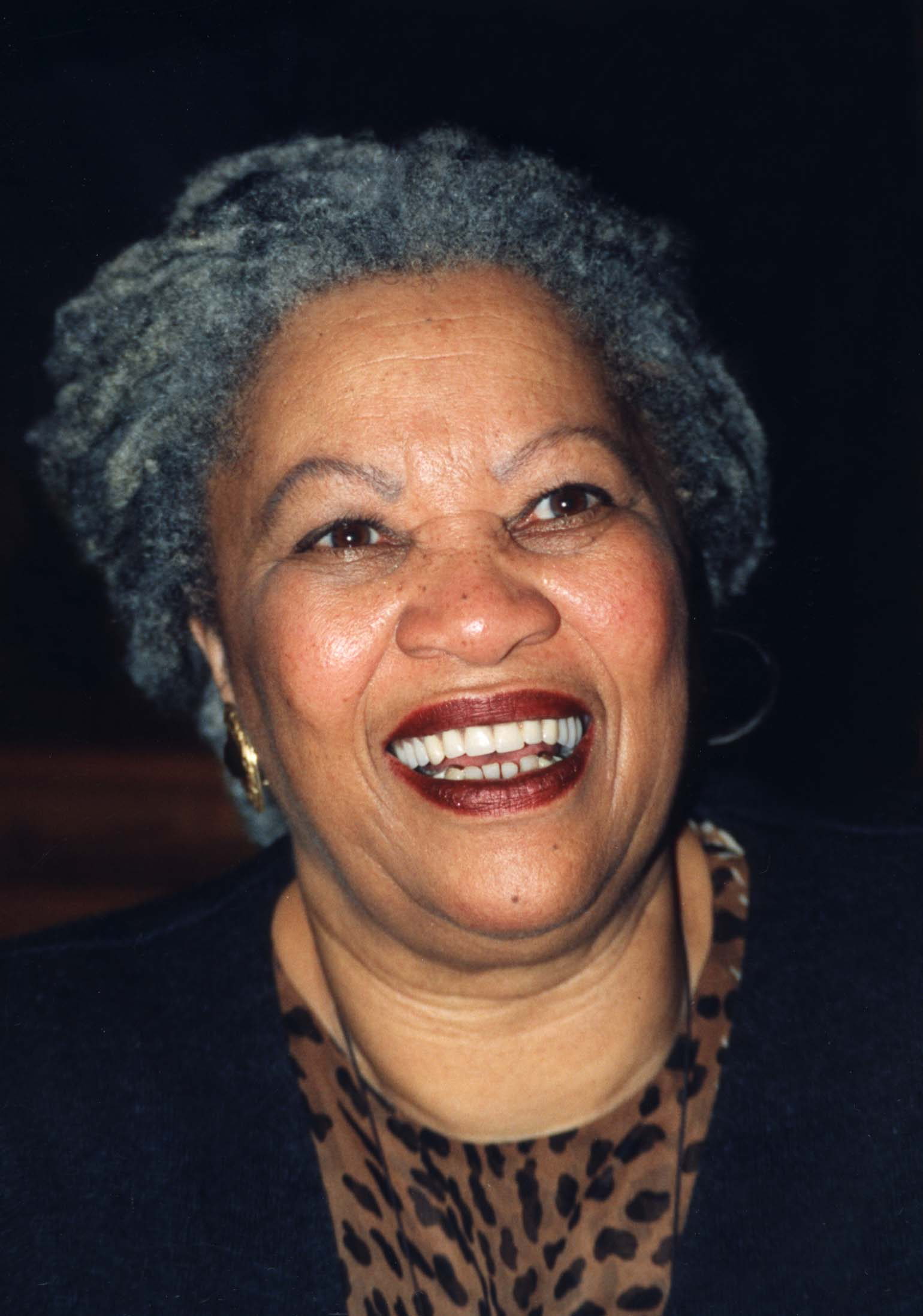
Toni Morrison

- February 6
  - Rip Torn, actor (d. 2019)
  - Mamie Van Doren, film actress
- February 7 – Dudley Laufman, contra dancer (d. 2026)
- February 8
  - James Dean, actor (d. 1955)
  - Larry Dolan, attorney and baseball club owner (d. 2025)
- February 9
  - Robert Morris, sculptor and artist (d. 2018)
  - Jack Van Impe, televangelist (d. 2020)
- February 10 – Carl Rettenmeyer, biologist (d. 2009)
- February 11 – Larry Merchant, author and boxing commentator
- February 13 – Geoff Edwards, actor, game show host (d. 2014)
- February 15 – Maxine Singer, molecular biologist (d. 2024)
- February 16 – George E. Sangmeister, politician (d. 2007)
- February 18
  - Johnny Hart, cartoonist (d. 2007)
  - Toni Morrison, African-American novelist, essayist, editor, teacher and professor (d. 2019)
  - Bob St. Clair, American football player (d. 2015)
- February 20 – John Milnor, mathematician
- February 23 – Betty Ray McCain, politician (d. 2022)
- February 24
  - James Abourezk, politician (d. 2023)
  - Dominic Chianese, actor, singer
- February 28
  - Gavin MacLeod, actor and mayor of Pacific Palisades (d. 2021)
  - Dean Smith, basketball player and coach (d. 2015)

=== March ===
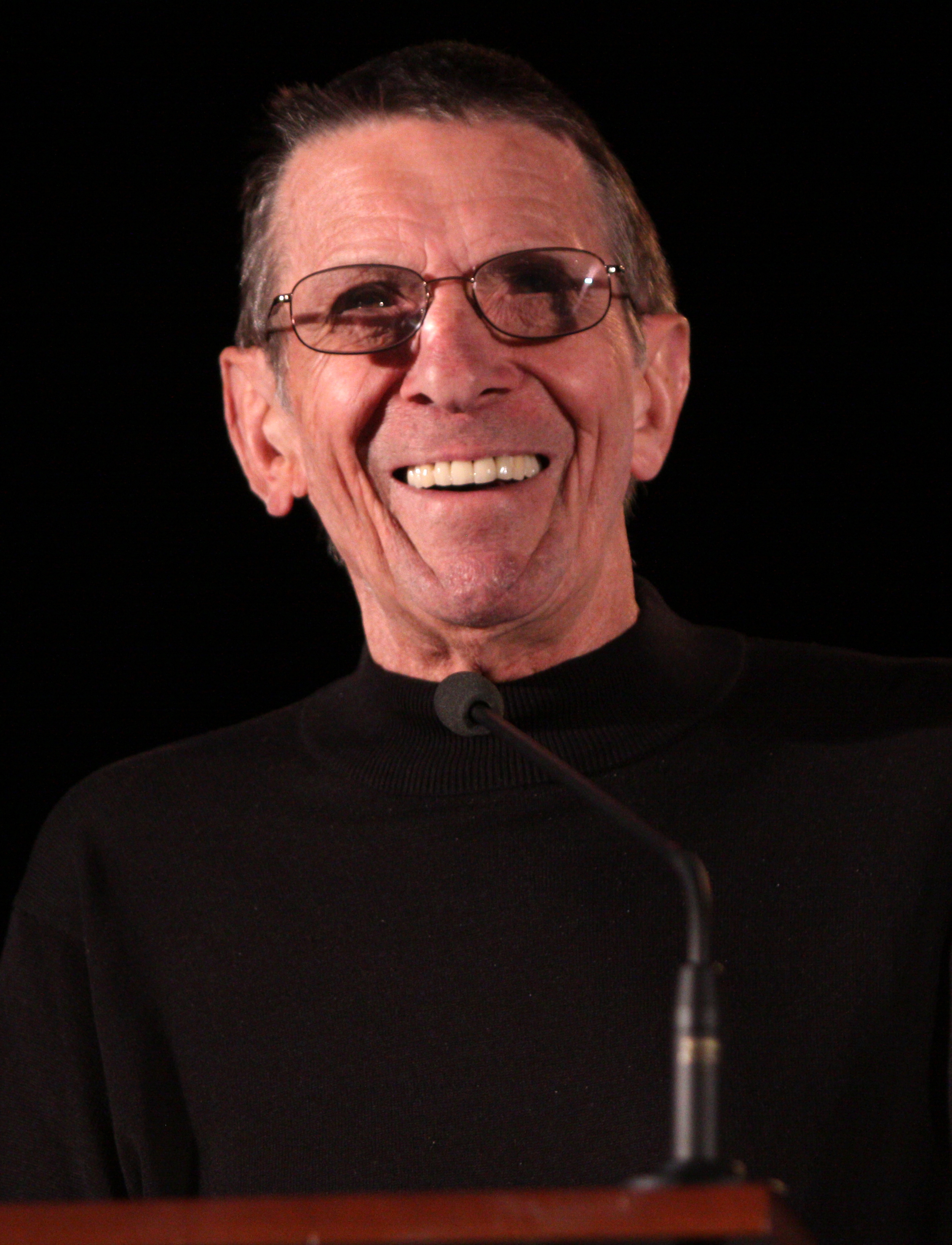
Leonard Nimoy

- March 3 – Paul Clayton, folk singer and folklorist (d. 1967)
- March 4
  - Wally Bruner, journalist and television host (d. 1997)
  - Alice Rivlin, born Georgianna Alice Mitchell, American economist (d. 2019)
- March 6
  - Carmen de Lavallade, actress, dancer and choreographer (d. 2025)
  - John Smith, actor (d. 1995)
- March 12 – Herb Kelleher, businessman (d. 2019)
- March 15
  - D. J. Fontana, drummer (d. 2018)
  - Ted Marchibroda, American football player (d. 2016)
- March 17 – Lorraine Ellison, African-American soul singer (d. 1983)
- March 18 – Shirley Stovroff, American baseball player (d. 1994)
- March 20
  - Norman Francis, American lawyer and academic (d. 2026)
  - Hal Linden, American actor, singer (Barney Miller)
  - Karen Steele, American actress and model (d. 1988)
- March 22
  - Paul G. Hewitt, American physicist, boxer, uranium prospector, author and cartoonist
  - Burton Richter, American physicist, recipient of the Nobel Prize in Physics in 1976
- March 24 – Connie Hines, American actress (d. 2009)
- March 26 – Leonard Nimoy, American actor and film director (d. 2015)
- March 27 – David Janssen, American actor (d. 1980)

=== April ===
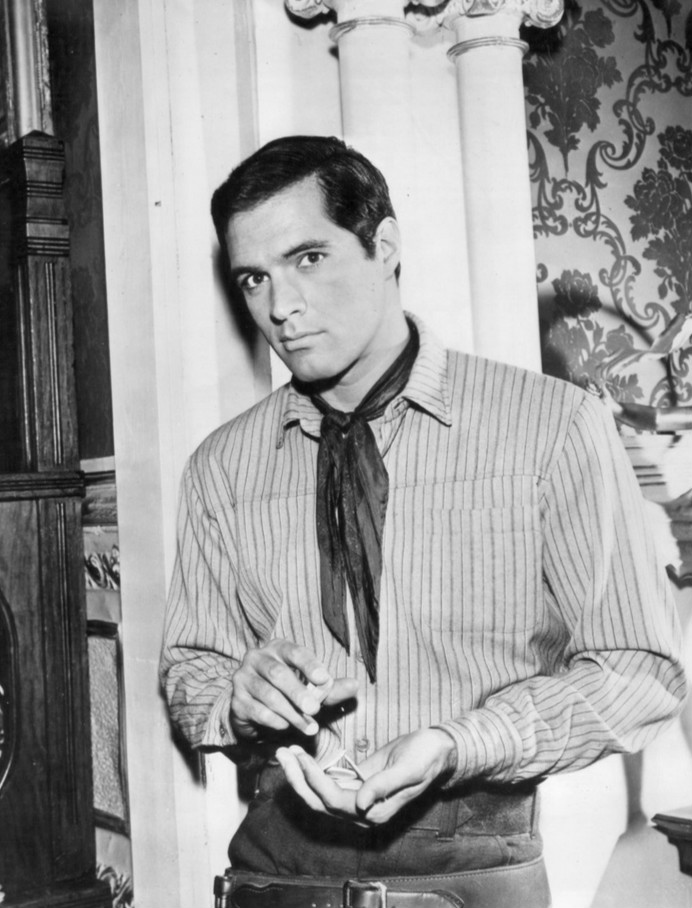
John Gavin

- April 5 – Jack Clement, singer-songwriter, record producer (d. 2013)
- April 8
  - John Gavin, actor, diplomat (d. 2018)
  - Jack Stallings, baseball head coach (d. 2018)
- April 10 – James L. Dozier, U.S. Army officer
- April 11 – Johnny Sheffield, child actor (d. 2010)
- April 13 – Dan Gurney, race car driver (d. 2018)
- April 14 – Hugh Leatherman, politician (d. 2021)
- April 16 – Julian Carroll, lawyer and politician, Governor of Kentucky (d. 2023)
- April 18
  - Edmond Gionet, politician, member of the New Hampshire House of Representatives (d. 2019).
  - Noel Marshall, agent and producer (d. 2010)
- April 19 – Fred Brooks, computer scientist (d. 2022)
- April 22 – Joe Cuba, musician (d. 2009)
- April 23 – Chuck Feeney, businessman and philanthropist (d. 2023)
- April 26 – Ted Stanley, businessman and philanthropist (d. 2016)
- April 29 – Don Leo Jonathan, American-Canadian professional wrestler (d. 2018)
- April 30
  - Eugene John Gerber, Catholic prelate (d. 2018)
  - Peter La Farge, singer, songwriter (d. 1965)

=== May ===
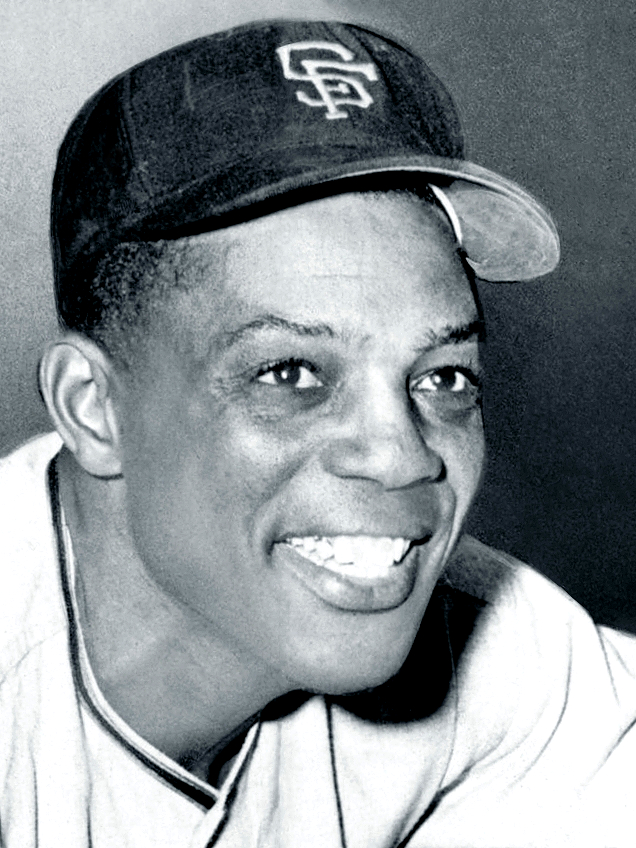
Willie Mays

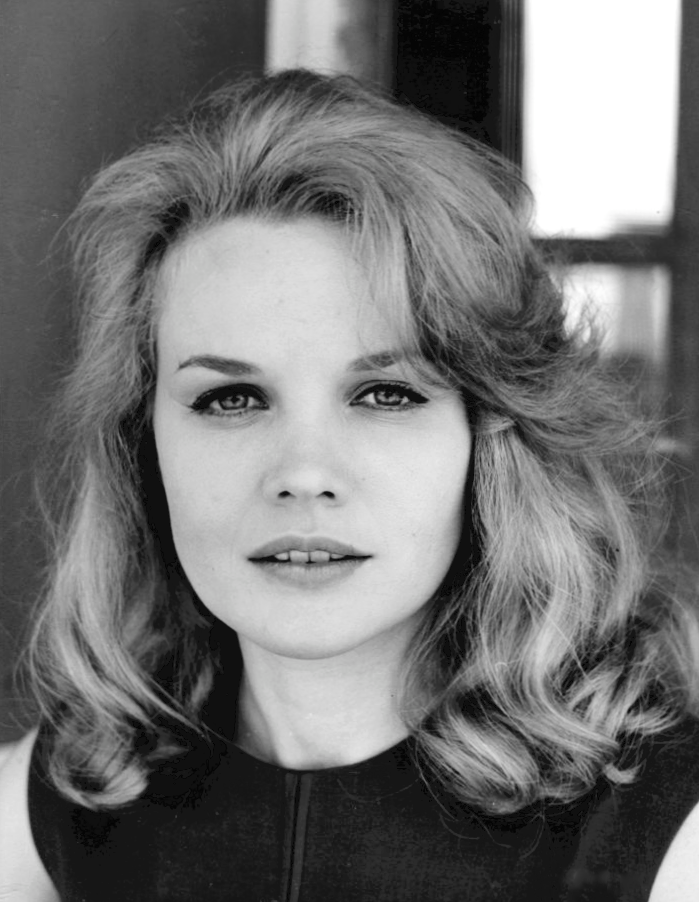
Carroll Baker

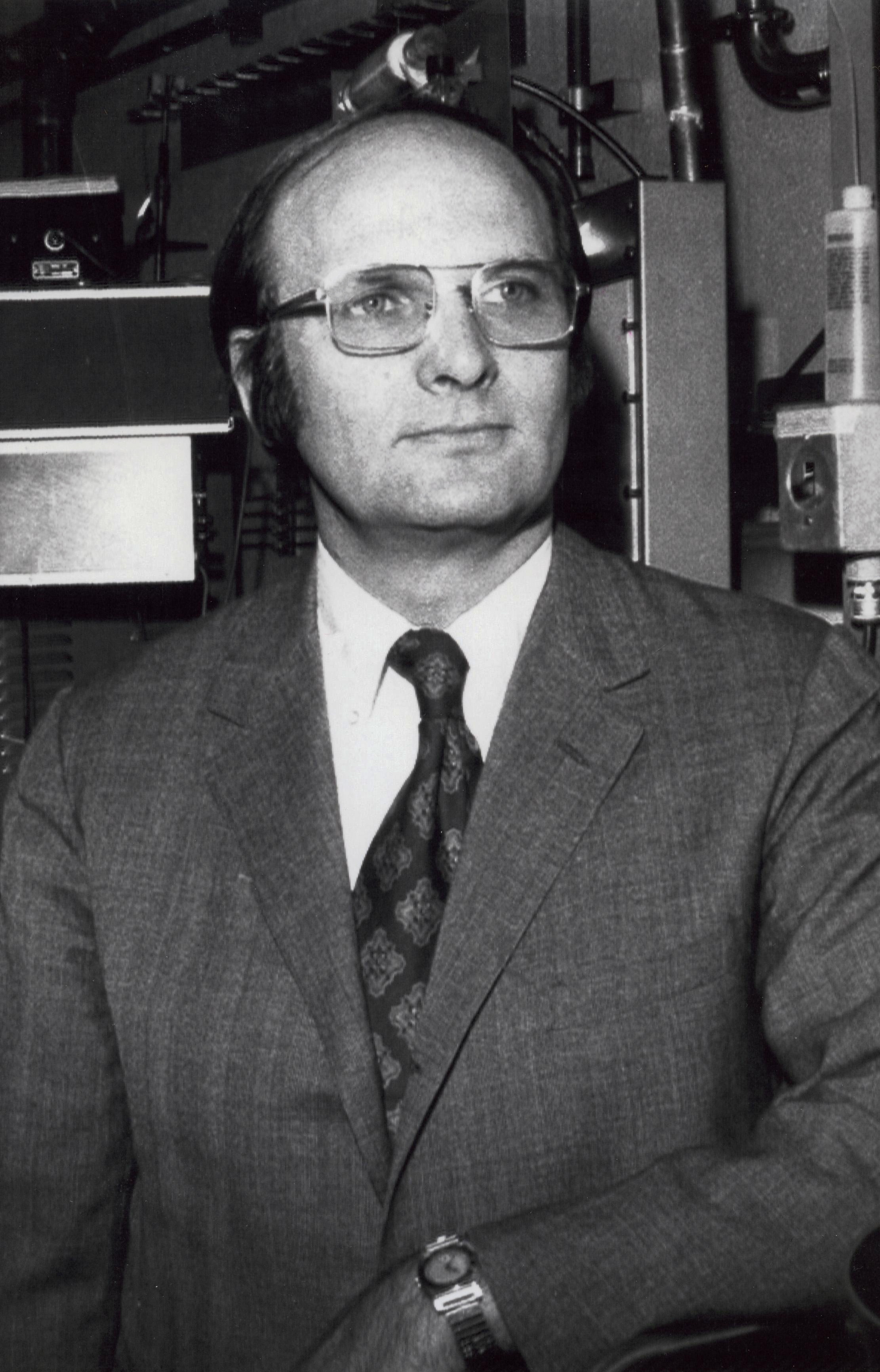
John Schrieffer

- May 2 – Cruz Reynoso, civil rights lawyer and jurist (d. 2021)
- May 6
  - Louis Gambaccini, civil servant (d. 2018)
  - Willie Mays, African-American baseball player (d. 2024)
- May 7
  - Teresa Brewer, pop and jazz singer (d. 2007)
  - Jerry Chesnut, songwriter (d. 2018)
- May 8 – Bob Clotworthy, American diver (d. 2018)
- May 9 – Don Gardner, American singer-songwriter (d. 2018)
- May 13 – Jim Jones, American People's Temple cult leader (d. 1978)
- May 14
  - Alvin Lucier, American composer (d. 2021)
  - Frank Shrontz, American businessman and politician (d. 2024)
- May 15
  - Joseph A. Califano Jr., Chairman of the National Center on Addiction and Substance Abuse
  - Ken Venturi, golfer (d. 2013)
- May 16
  - Jack Dodson, actor (d. 1994)
  - Lowell Weicker, politician (d. 2023)
- May 17
  - Stan Albeck, basketball coach (d. 2021)
  - Marshall Applewhite, Heaven's Gate religious sect founder (d. 1997)
- May 18
  - Don Martin, artist (MAD Magazine) (d. 2000)
  - Robert Morse, actor (d. 2022)
  - George Shapiro, talent manager and television producer (d. 2022)
- May 19 — David Wilkerson, Christian evangelist (d. 2011)
- May 20 – Ken Boyer, baseball player (d. 1982)
- May 23
  - Barbara Barrie, actress
  - Patience Cleveland, actress and diarist (d. 2004)
- May 28 – Carroll Baker, actress
- May 30
  - Charles Bowsher, businessman and politician, Comptroller General of the United States (d. 2022)
  - Audrey Flack, visual artist (d. 2024)
- May 31
  - John Schrieffer, physicist, recipient of the Nobel Prize in Physics in 1972 (d. 2019)
  - Shirley Verrett, mezzo-soprano (d. 2010)

=== June ===
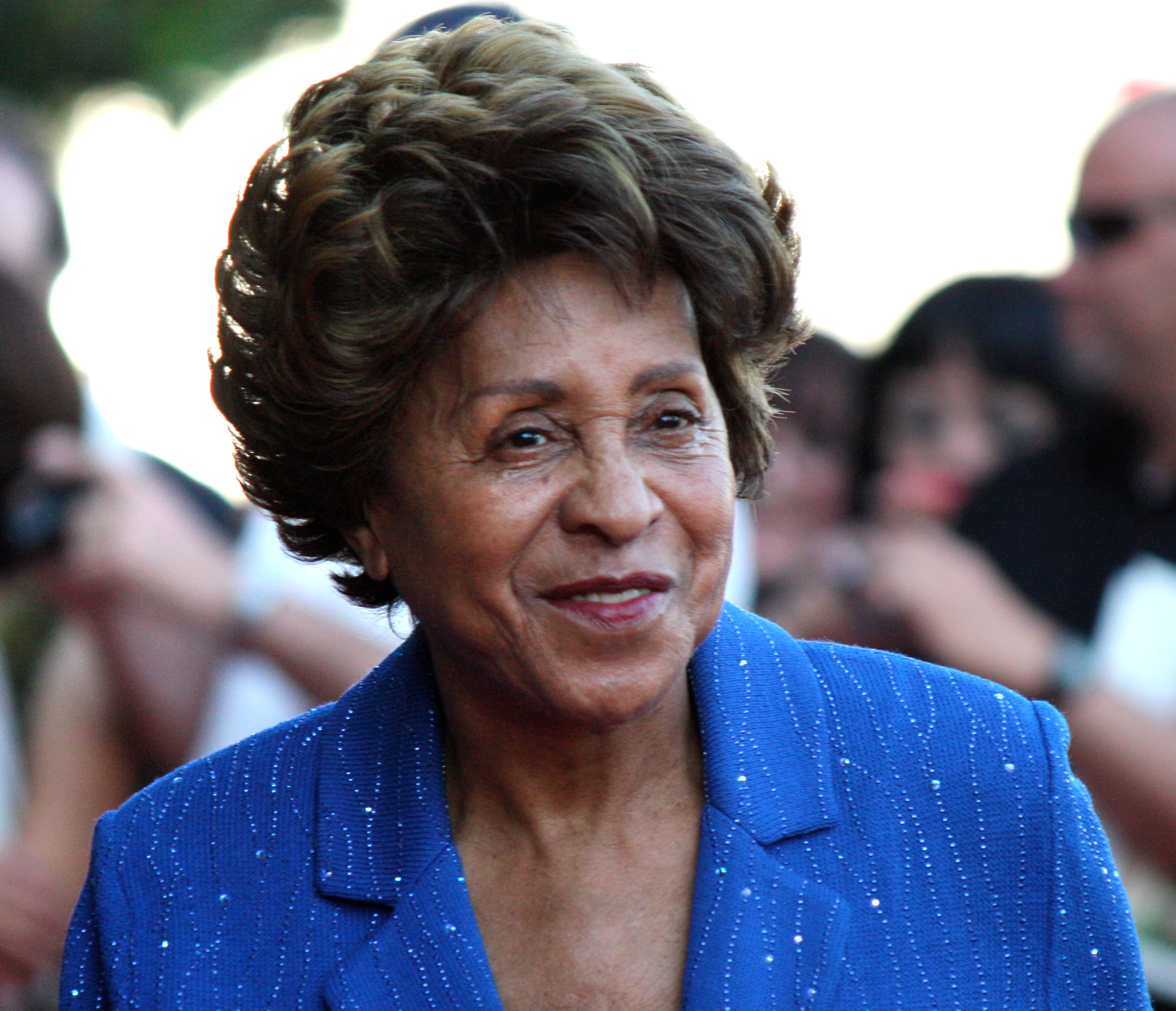
Marla Gibbs

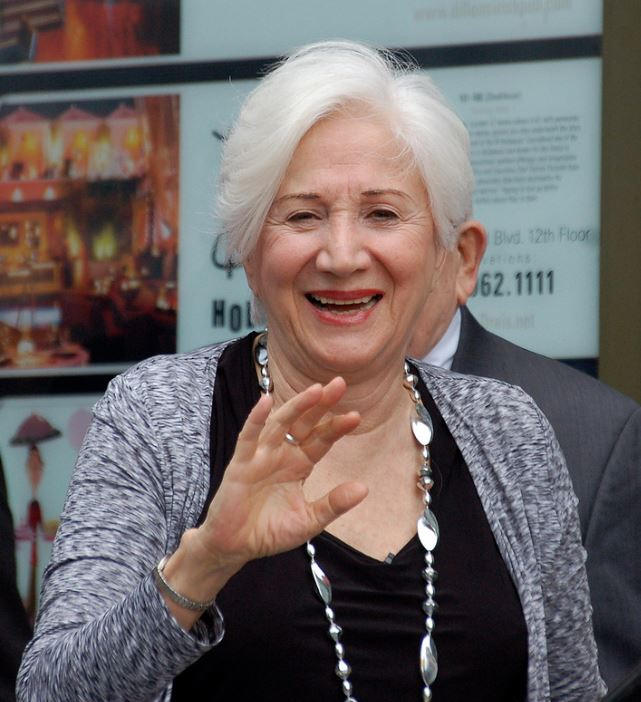
Olympia Dukakis

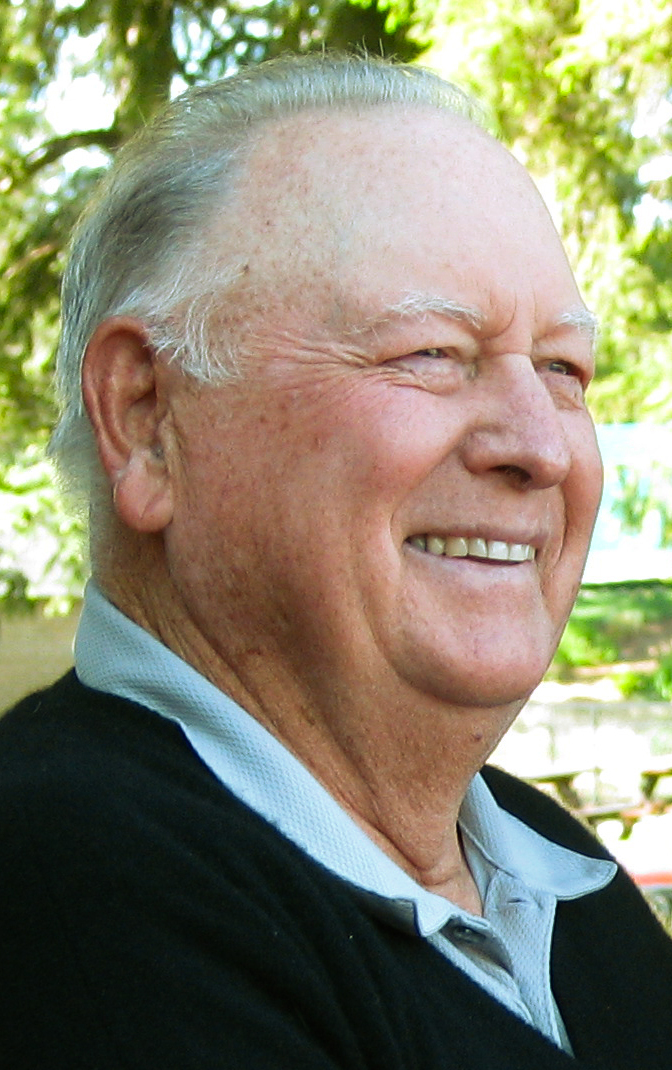
Billy Casper

- June 1 – Hal R. Smith, American baseball player and coach (d. 2014)
- June 2
  - William H. Donaldson, American banker and businessman, co-founded Donaldson, Lufkin & Jenrette
  - James L. Fisher, American psychologist and academic administrator (d. 2022)
  - Larry Jackson, American baseball player and politician (d. 1990)
- June 6 – Ken Knowlton, American computer graphics pioneer (d. 2022)
- June 9
  - Joe Santos, American actor (d. 2016)
  - Bill Virdon, American baseball player (d. 2021)
- June 11 – Paul Hardin III, American academic administrator (d. 2017)
- June 12 – Rona Jaffe, American novelist (d. 2005)
- June 13
  - Marla Gibbs, African-American actress, comedian and singer
  - Junior Walker, saxophonist, singer (d. 1995)
- June 20
  - Olympia Dukakis, screen actress (d. 2021)
  - Mary L. Good, inorganic chemist (d. 2019)
  - James Tolkan, actor (d. 2026)
- June 21
  - Margaret Heckler, Secretary of Health and Human Services (d. 2018)
  - Les Vandyke, musician (d. 2021)
- June 22 – Martin Lipton, American lawyer
- June 23 – Doris Cook, American baseball pitcher, outfielder
- June 24
  - Billy Casper, golfer (d. 2015)
  - Juanita Quigley, child actress (d. 2017)
- June 26
  - Robert Colbert, actor
  - George Lois, art director, designer and author (d. 2022)
- June 28
  - Junior Johnson, NASCAR driver of the 1950s and 1960s (d. 2019)
  - Tom Stolhandske, American football linebacker
- June 29
  - Richard L. Berkley, politician (d. 2023)
  - Ed Gilbert, actor (d. 1999)
- June 30
  - Don Gross, American baseball player (d. 2017)
  - Ronald Rene Lagueux, American judge (d. 2023)
  - Kaye Vaughan, American football player (d. 2023)

=== July ===
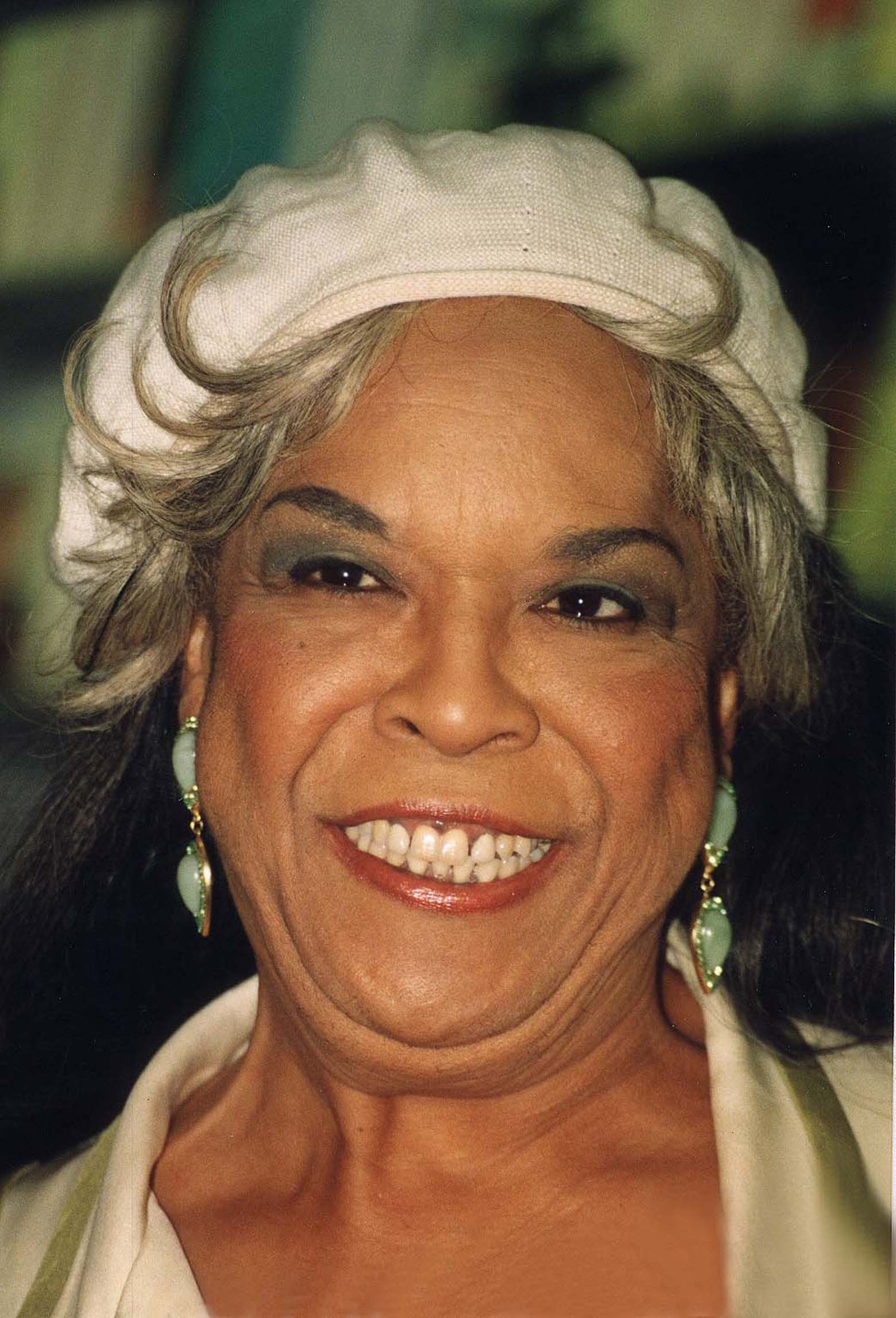
Della Reese

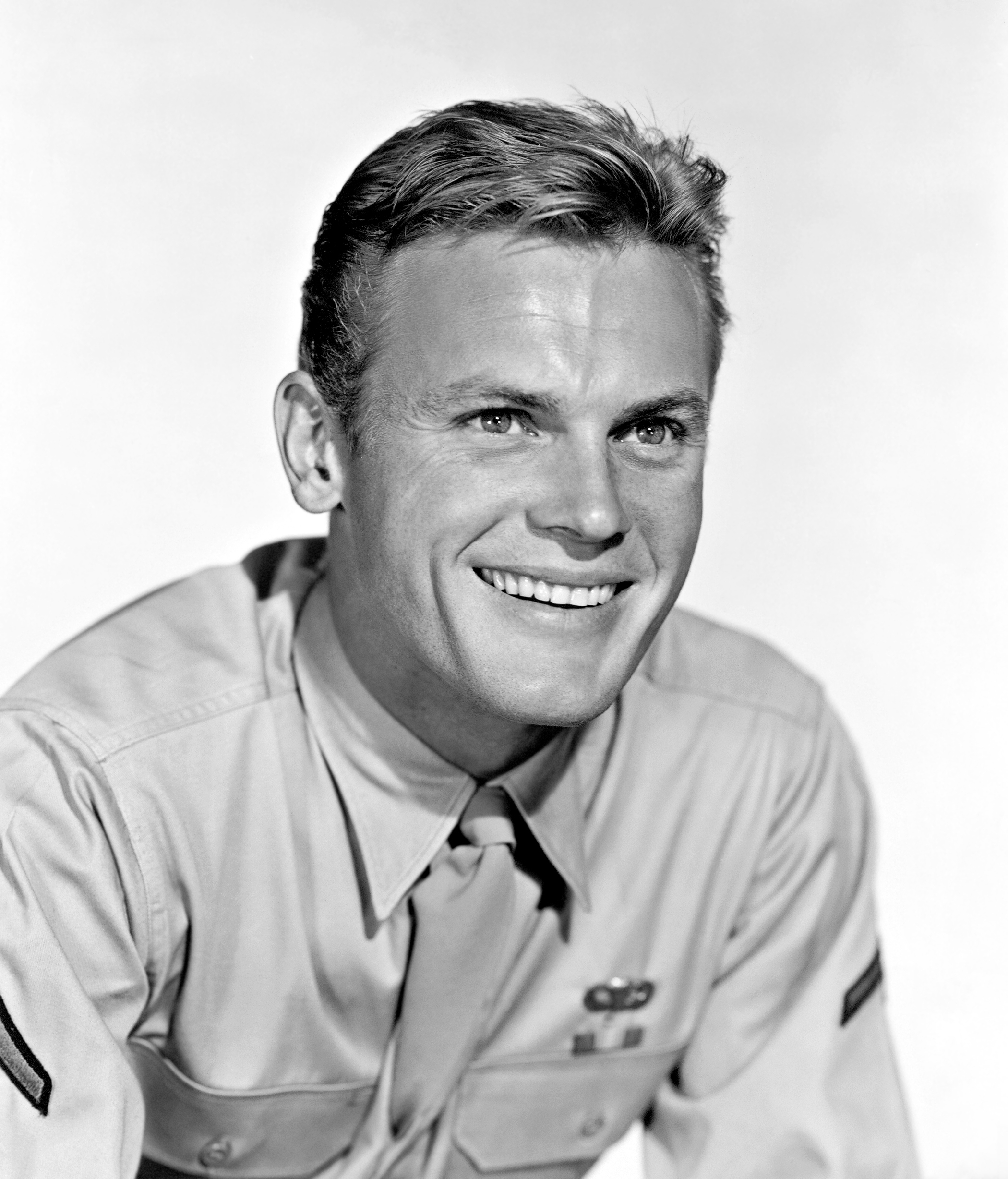
Tab Hunter

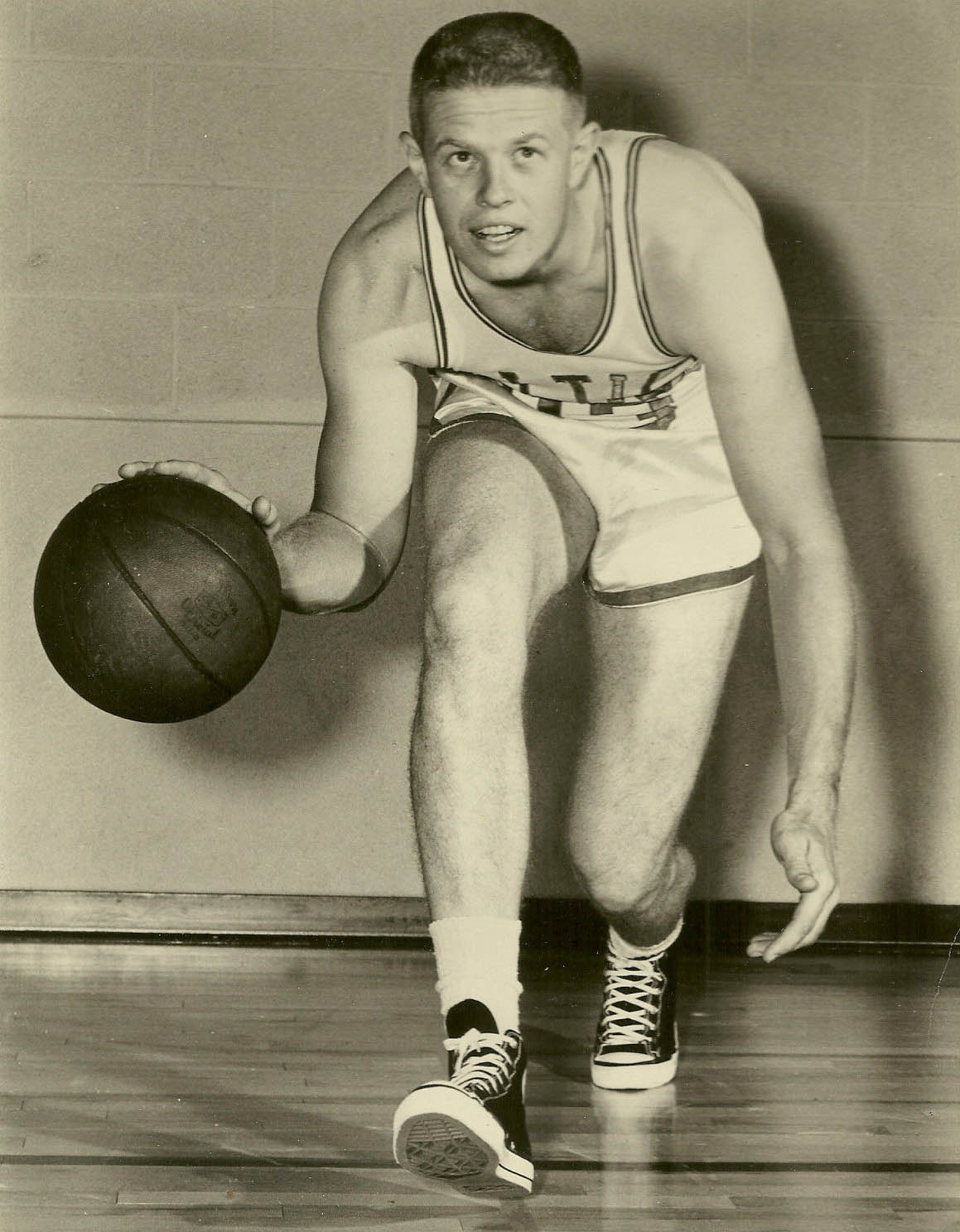
Frank Ramsey

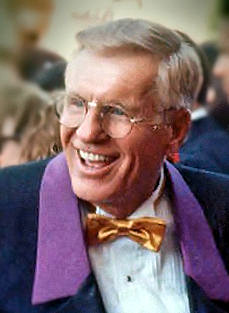
Jerry Van Dyke

- July 1 – Marilyn Hickey, American televangelist, speaker and author
- July 3
  - Ed Roebuck, American Major League Baseball relief pitcher (d. 2018)
  - Ray Rogers, American politician (d. 2020)
- July 4
  - Rick Casares, American football player and soldier (d. 2013)
  - Bobby Malkmus, American Major League Baseball infielder, scout
  - Lyndell Petersen, American politician
- July 6
  - Robert Dunham, American actor, writer (d. 2001)
  - Maralou Gray, American film, television, and theater actress
  - Della Reese, African-American actress, singer and evangelist (d. 2017)
- July 7 – J. Joseph Curran Jr., American politician
- July 8
  - Lowell N. Lewis, American plant physiology professor (d. 2021)
  - Zach Monroe, American baseball player
- July 9
  - Rodney Anderson, American politician
  - Sylvia Bacon, American judge (d. 2023)
  - Thomas A. Pankok, American Democratic Party politician (d. 2022)
- July 10
  - Nick Adams, American actor (d. 1968)
  - Jerry Herman, American composer, lyricist (d. 2019)
  - Julian May, American science fiction, fantasy, horror, and science writer (d. 2017)
- July 11 – Tab Hunter, American actor, singer (d. 2018)
- July 13
  - Ernie Colón, American-born Puerto Rico comics artist (d. 2019)
  - Frank Ramsey, American professional basketball player, coach (d. 2018)
- July 15
  - Clive Cussler, American thriller writer and underwater explorer (d. 2020)
  - Joanna Merlin, American actress and casting director (d. 2023)
- July 16 – Norm Sherry, American Major League Baseball catcher, manager, and coach (d. 2021)
- July 18 – Maury Duncan, American quarterback
- July 19
  - Marilyn Lewis, American politician (d. 2020)
  - Mary Lou Studnicka, American female professional baseball player (d. 2014)
- July 27 – Jerry Van Dyke, American comedian, actor (d. 2018)
- July 31
  - Nick Bollettieri, American tennis coach (d. 2022)
  - Kenny Burrell, American jazz guitarist

=== August ===
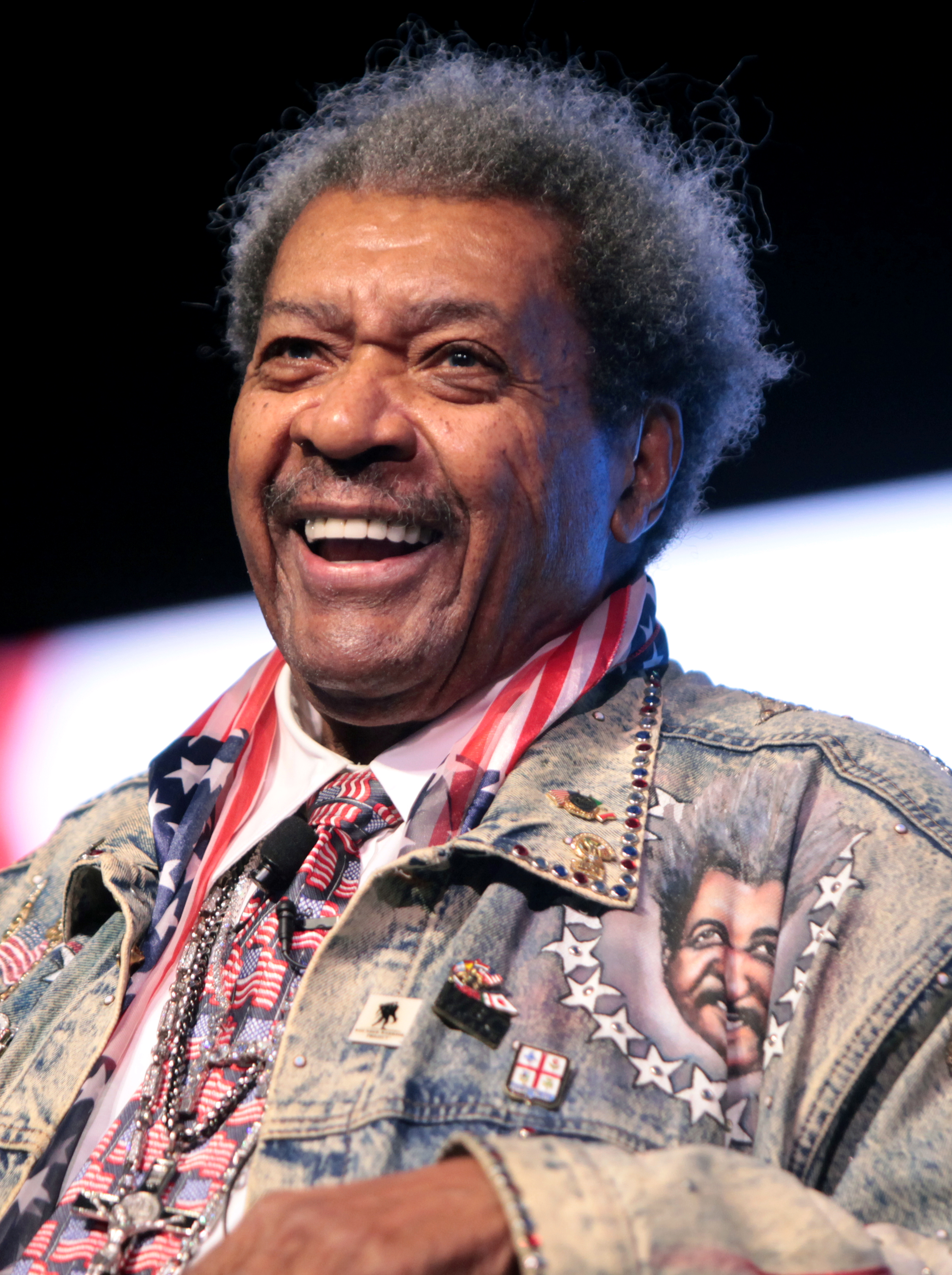
Don King

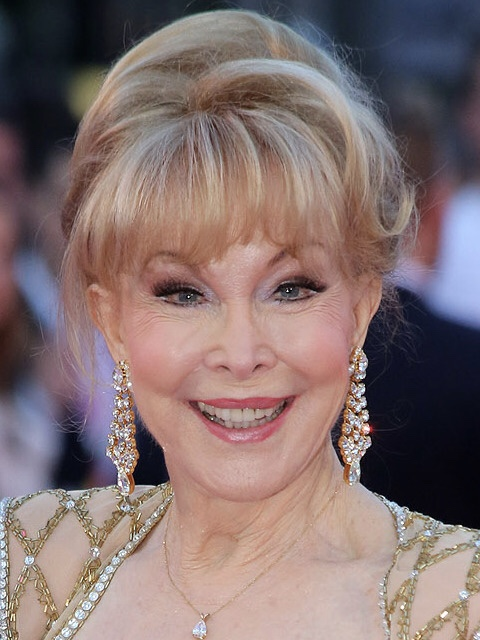
Barbara Eden

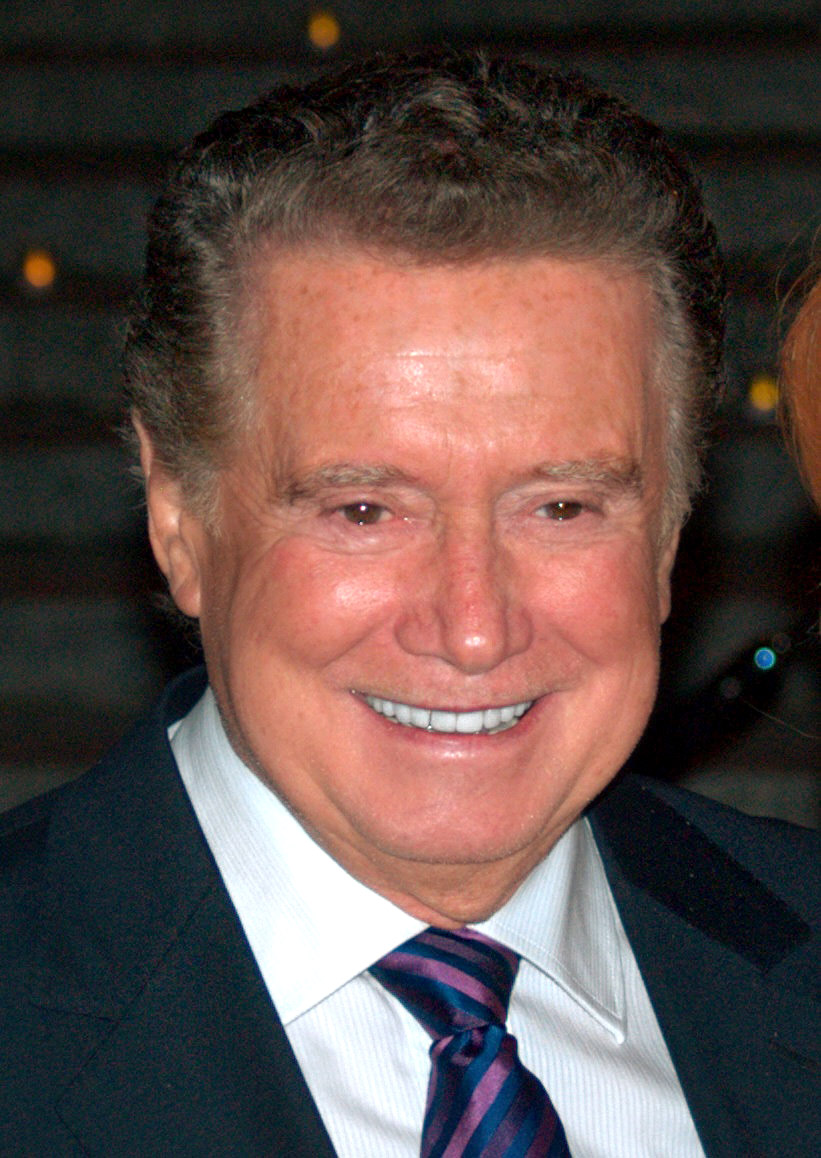
Regis Philbin

- August 1 – Hal Connolly, American athlete (d. 2010)
- August 2 – Hugh Aynesworth, American journalist (d. 2023)
- August 6 – Ron Feiereisel, American basketball player, coach (d. 2000)
- August 7 – Charles E. Rice, American legal scholar, author (d. 2015)
- August 10 – Tom Laughlin, American actor (Billy Jack) (d. 2013)
- August 12
  - William Goldman, American author (d. 2018)
  - Dolores Sibonga, American journalist, lawyer and politician (d. 2026)
- August 13 – William D. Mullins, American politician and baseball player (d. 1986)
- August 14 – Frederic Raphael, American-born British screenwriter, novelist and non-fiction author
- August 15
  - Joe Feeney, American singer (d. 2008)
  - Richard F. Heck, American chemist, recipient of the Nobel Prize in Chemistry in 2010 (d. 2015)
  - Janice Rule, American actress (d. 2003)
- August 16 – William Luce, American writer (d. 2019)
- August 19 – Willie Shoemaker, American jockey (d. 2003)
- August 20 – Don King, African-American boxing promoter
- August 23
  - Barbara Eden, American actress, singer (I Dream of Jeannie)
  - Doris F. Fisher, American businesswoman (d. 2026)
  - Lyle Lahey, American cartoonist (d. 2013)
  - Hamilton O. Smith, American microbiologist, recipient of the Nobel Prize in Physiology or Medicine in 1978 (d. 2025)
- August 25
  - Cecil Andrus, American politician (d. 2017)
  - Hal Fishman, Los Angeles-based American local news anchor (d. 2007)
  - Regis Philbin, American television personality (d. 2020)
- August 27 – Joe Cunningham, American baseball player (d. 2021)
- August 30 – Jack Swigert, American astronaut (d. 1982)
- August 31 – Noble Willingham, American actor (d. 2004)

=== September ===
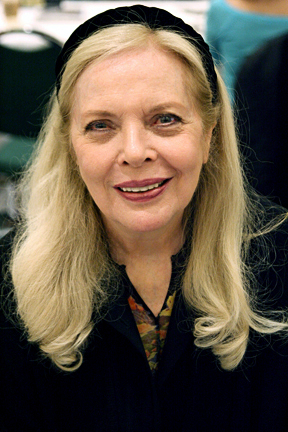
Barbara Bain

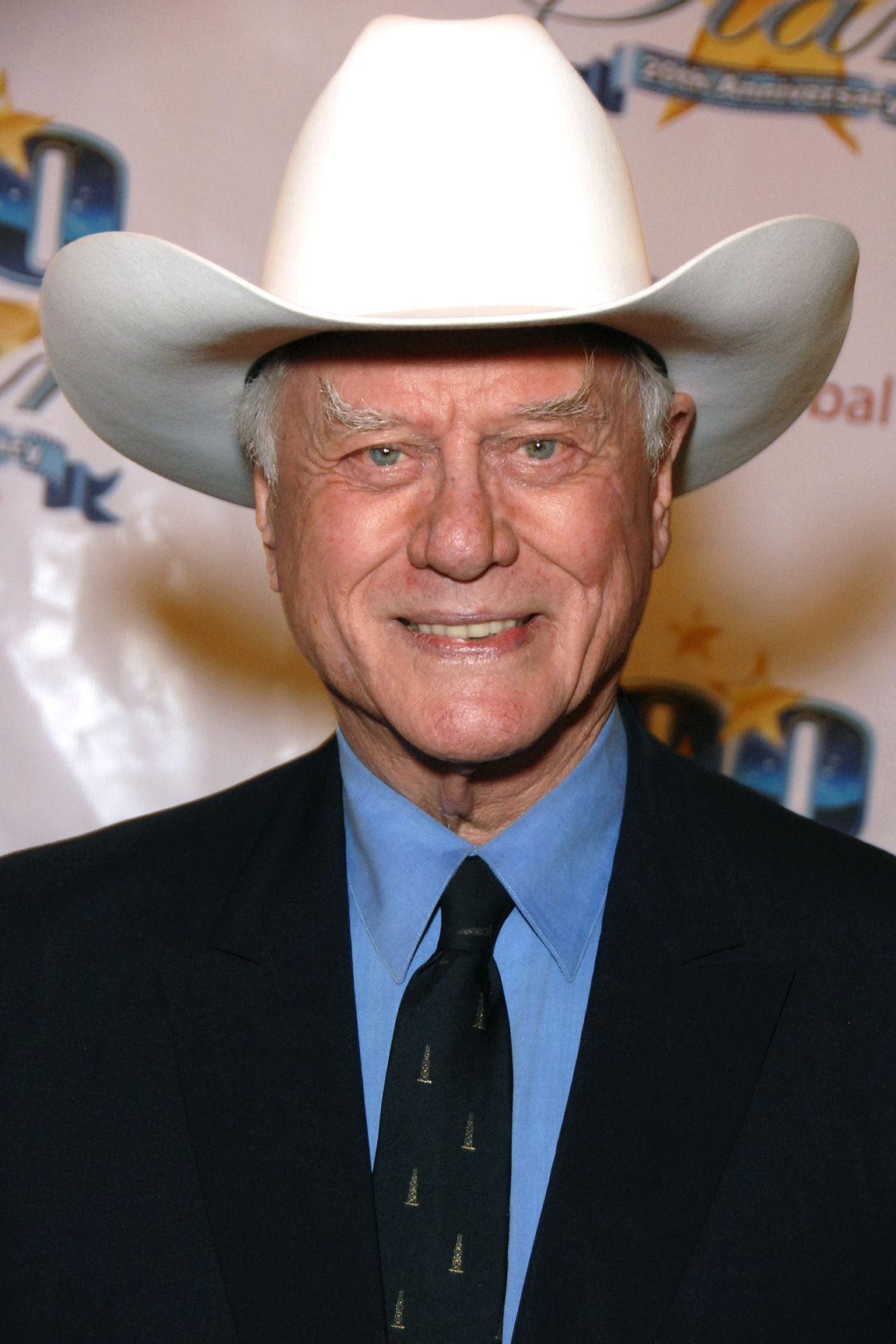
Larry Hagman

- September 1 – Richard Hundley, American pianist, composer (d. 2018)
- September 2
  - Michael Dante, American actor
  - Alan Simpson, politician (d. 2025)
  - Ernest E. West, soldier, Medal of Honor recipient (d. 2021)
- September 3 – Tom Brewer, American baseball player (d. 2018)
- September 4 – Mitzi Gaynor, American actress, singer and dancer (d. 2024)
- September 10
  - Mathew Ahmann, American Catholic civil rights activist (d. 2001)
  - Philip Baker Hall, American actor (d. 2022)
- September 11 – John Reger, American football player (d. 2013)
- September 12
  - George Jones, American country music singer, songwriter (d. 2013)
  - Bill McKinney, American actor (d. 2011)
- September 13 – Barbara Bain, American actress (Mission: Impossible)
- September 16 – Little Willie Littlefield, American R&B pianist and singer (d. 2013)
- September 17 – Anne Bancroft, American actress (d. 2005)
- September 19
  - Brook Benton, American singer-songwriter (d. 1988)
  - Ray Danton, American actor (d. 1992)
- September 20 – Malachy McCourt, American actor and writer (d. 2024)
- September 21
  - Gertrude Alderfer, American female professional baseball player (d. 2018)
  - Gloria Cordes, American female professional baseball player (d. 2018)
  - Larry Hagman, American actor, director (Dallas) (d. 2012)
- September 29 – James Watson Cronin, American nuclear physicist, recipient of the Nobel Prize in Physics in 1980 (d. 2016)
- September 30
  - Angie Dickinson, American actress
  - Wesley L. Fox, U.S. Marine Corps officer (d. 2017)

=== October ===
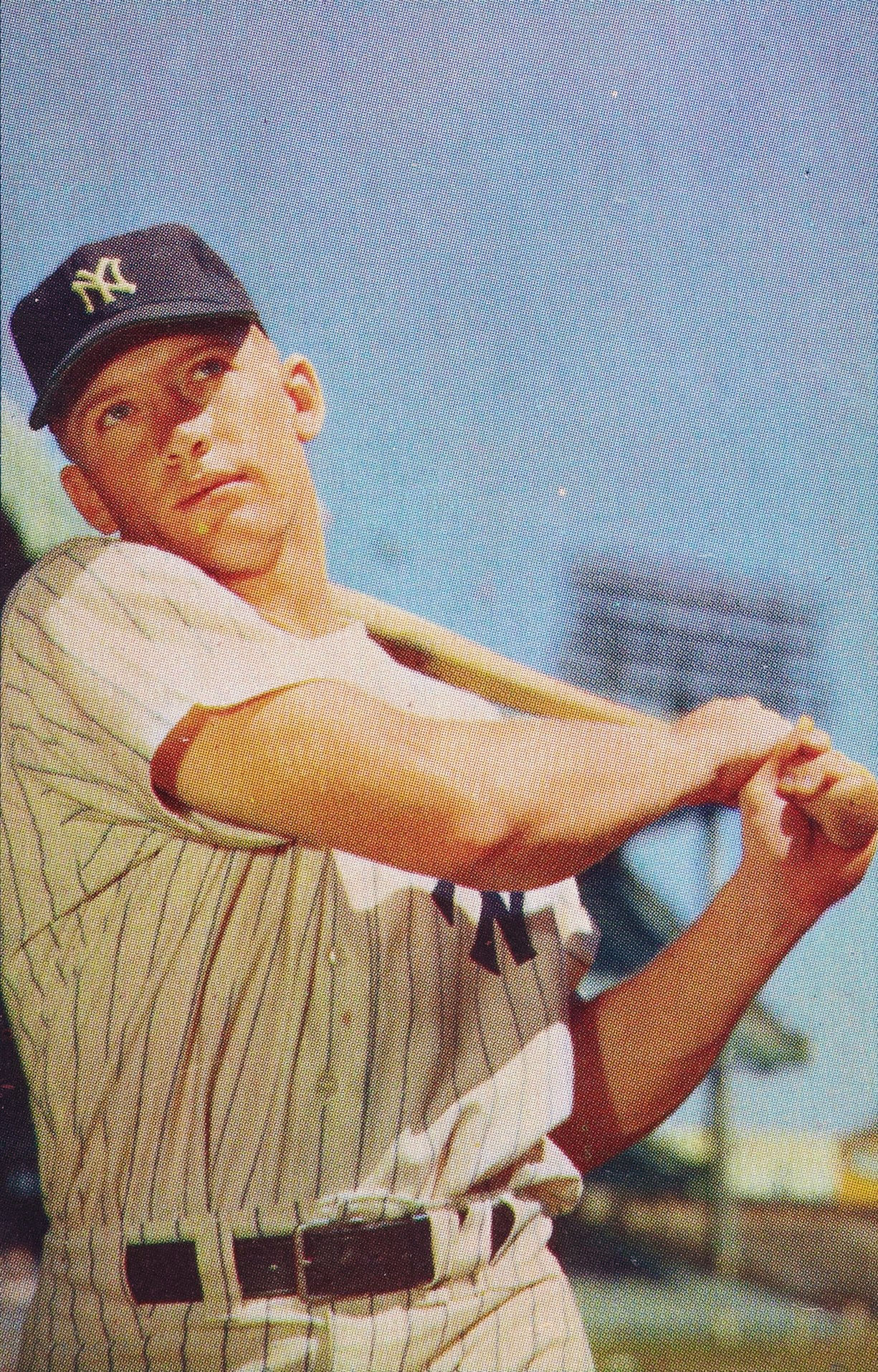
Mickey Mantle

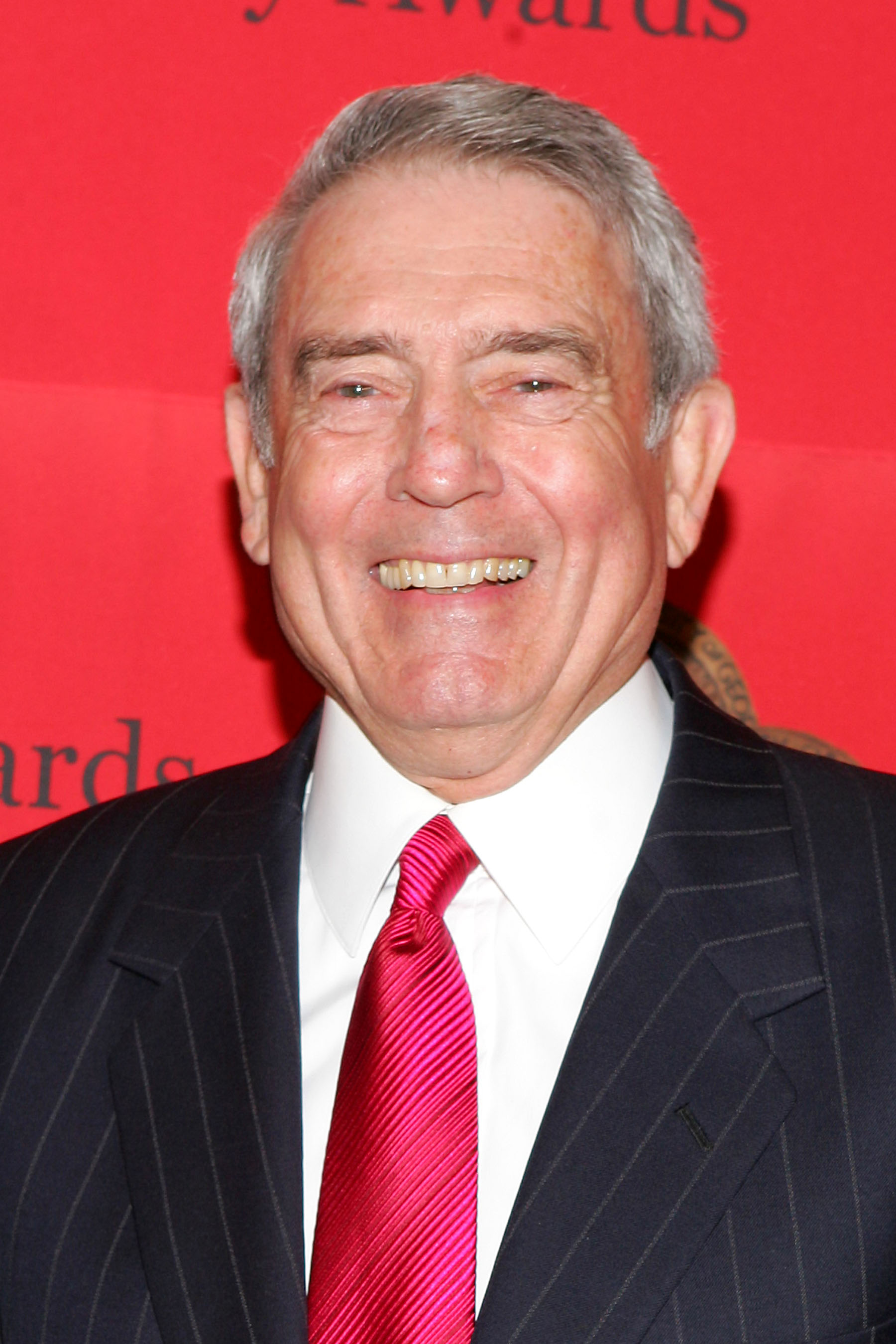
Dan Rather

- October 1 – Alan Wagner, opera critic (d. 2007)
- October 2 – Morris Cerullo, televangelist (d. 2020)
- October 3 – Denise Scott Brown, architect
- October 7
  - Jack Berry, sports journalist (d. 2026)
  - Ruth Butler, art historian (d. 2024)
  - Cotton Fitzsimmons, basketball coach (d. 2004)
- October 13 – Eddie Mathews, baseball player (d. 2001)
- October 15
  - Freddy Cole, singer and pianist (d. 2020)
  - Gail Harris, baseball player and coach (d. 2012)
- October 16
  - James Chace, historian (d. 2004)
  - Charles Colson, politician, Watergate conspirator, later evangelist (d. 2012)
- October 20
  - Mickey Mantle, baseball player (d. 1995)
  - Zeke Bratkowski, American football player (d. 2019)
- October 22 – Ann Rule, true-crime writer (d. 2015)
- October 23 – Jim Bunning, baseball player and U.S. Senator from Kentucky from 1999 to 2011 (d. 2017)
- October 26
  - Hank Garrett, actor, comedian
  - Larry Lieber, comic book artist and writer
- October 28
  - Harold Battiste, composer, arranger (d. 2015)
  - Everett Mendelsohn, historian of science (d. 2023)
  - Gerald Talbot, politician and civil rights leader (d. 2026)
- October 30
  - Dick Gautier, actor (d. 2017)
  - Rita Crocker Clements, political organizer (d. 2018)
- October 31
  - Jack Molinas, basketball player (d. 1975)
  - Dan Rather, television news reporter (CBS Evening News)

=== November ===
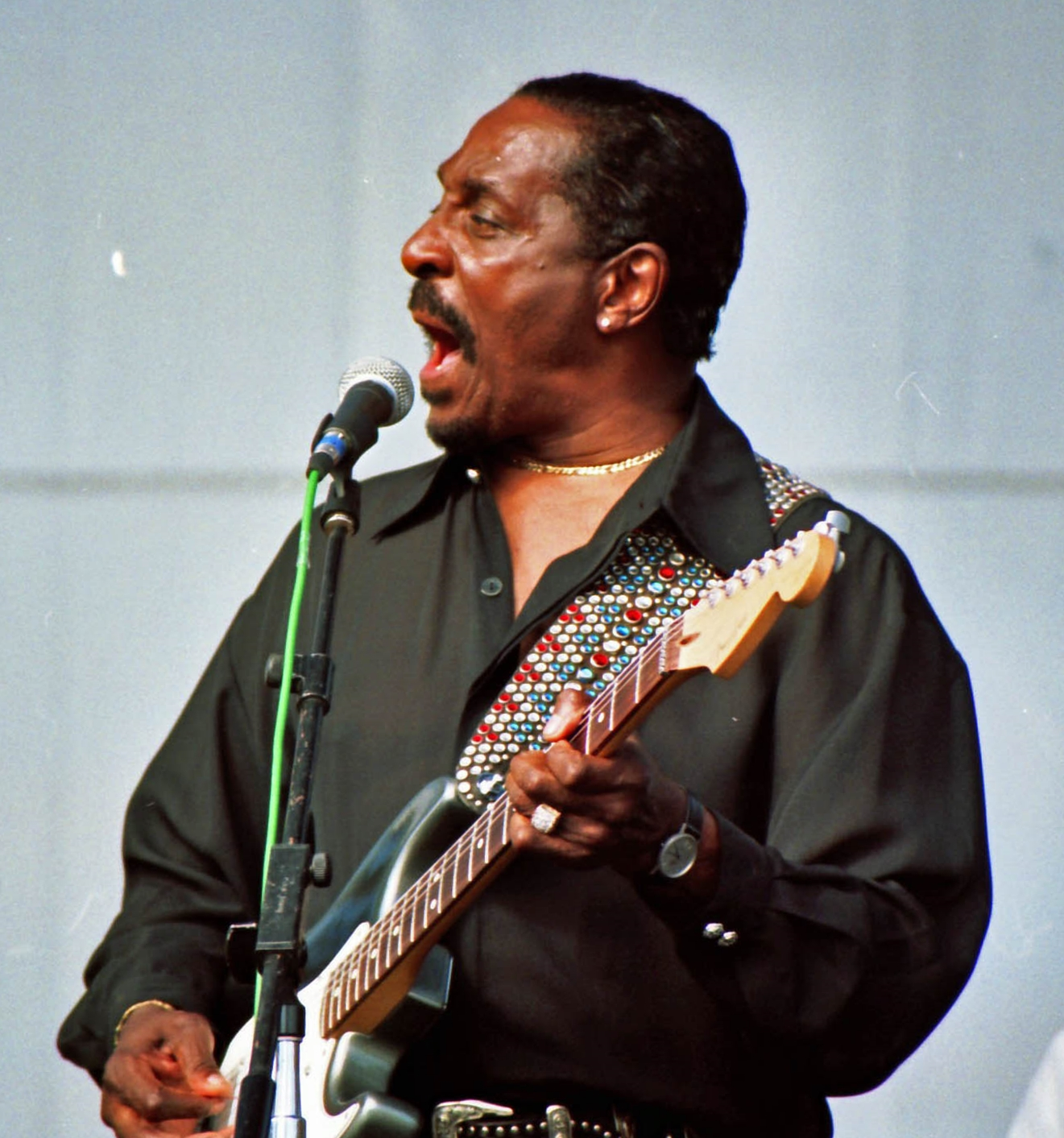
Ike Turner

- November 1 – Jack Morris, American football player (d. 2022)
- November 2 – Phil Woods, saxophonist (d. 2015)
- November 4
  - Marie Mansfield, professional baseball player (d. 2024)
  - Bernard Francis Law, cardinal (d. 2017 in Italy)
- November 5 – Ike Turner, African-American rock musician (d. 2007)
- November 8
  - Jack Collom, poet, essayist and poetry teacher (d. 2017)
  - Darla Hood, child actress, and singer (d. 1979)
- November 9
  - Pascal F. Calogero Jr., judge (d. 2018)
  - Whitey Herzog, baseball player and manager (d. 2024)
- November 11 – Leslie Parnas, cellist (d. 2022)
- November 12
  - Norman Mineta, politician (d. 2022)
  - Mary Louise Wilson, actress, singer
- November 14 – Dolores Crow, politician, legislator (d. 2018)
- November 15 – John Kerr, actor (d. 2013)
- November 16
  - Duane E. Dewey, Medal of Honor recipient (d. 2021)
  - Hubert Sumlin, blues musician (d. 2011)
- November 16 – Hubert Sumlin, blues musician (d. 2011)
- November 24 – Tommy Allsup, musician (d. 2017)
- November 30
  - Jack Ging, actor (d. 2022)
  - Jack Sheldon, entertainer (d. 2019)

=== December ===
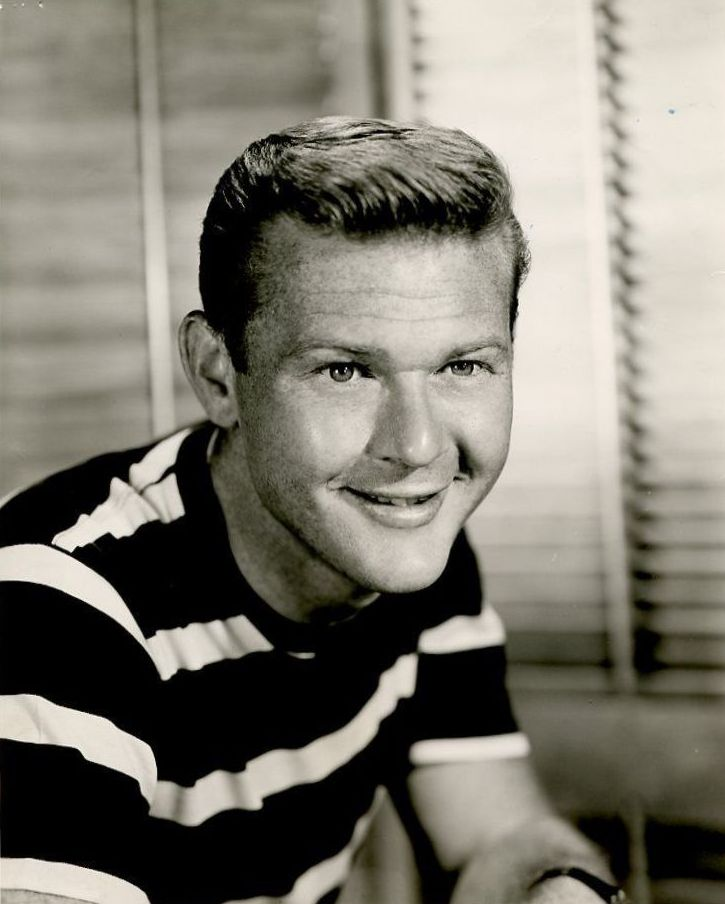
Martin Milner

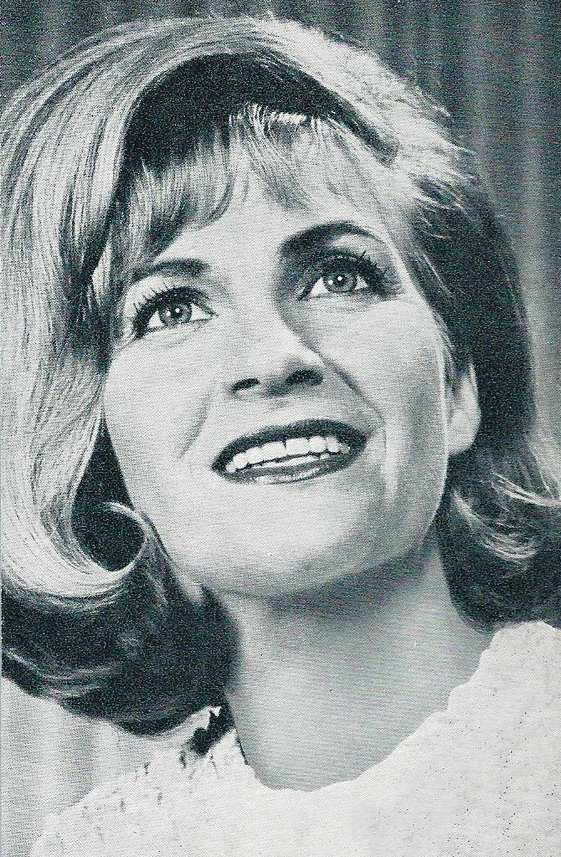
Skeeter Davis

- December 1
  - Jimmy Lyons, American musician (d. 1986)
  - Jim Nesbitt, American country music singer (d. 2007)
- December 2
  - Wynton Kelly, Jamaican-American jazz pianist, composer (d. 1971)
  - Edwin Meese, American attorney, law professor, and author
- December 3
  - Jaye P. Morgan, American singer, chanteuse
  - Jolene Unsoeld, American politician (d. 2021)
- December 7 – Richard N. Goodwin, American writer (d. 2018)
- December 11 – Benny Spellman, American R&B singer (d. 2011)
- December 15 – Minnie Lou Bradley, American rancher and cattlewoman d. 2025)
- December 16 – Ralph Wolfe Cowan, American portrait artist (d. 2018)
- December 17 – Dave Madden, actor (The Partridge Family) (d. 2014)
- December 18 – Gene Shue, American basketball player and coach (d. 2022)
- December 19 – Bud Clark, American politician and businessman (d. 2022)
- December 20
  - Terry Sanders, American film director, producer and screenwriter
  - Ike Skelton, American lawyer and politician (d. 2013)
- December 23 – Ronnie Schell, actor
- December 24 – Ray Bryant, jazz pianist, composer, arranger (d. 2011)
- December 25 – Lefty Driesell, American baseball coach (d. 2024)
- December 27
  - Edward E. Hammer, electrical engineer, inventor (d. 2012)
  - Scotty Moore, guitarist (d. 2016)
- December 28 – Martin Milner, actor (Adam-12) (d. 2015)
- December 30
  - Charles Bassett, American electrical engineer, astronaut (d. 1966)
  - Skeeter Davis, American country singer (d. 2004)
  - Charles E. Young, American academic administrator d. 2023)

=== Undated ===
- Don Whiteside, sociologist, native author, Canadian civil servant, and association founder. (d. 1993)

== Deaths ==
- January 4
  - Art Acord, actor (born 1890)
  - Roger Connor, baseball player and MLB Hall of Famer (born 1857)
- January 12 – Anna Manning Comfort, physician (born 1845)
- January 14 – Hardy Richardson, baseball player (born 1855)
- January 21 – Alma Rubens, actress (born 1897)
- January 31 – Zina P. Young Card, Mormon leader and women's rights activist (born 1850)
- February 14 – Clarence Ransom Edwards, army officer (born 1859)
- February 18 – Louis Wolheim, actor (born 1880)
- February 28
  - Laton Alton Huffman, photographer of the American frontier and Native American life (born 1854)
  - Thomas S. Rodgers, admiral (born 1858)
- March 20 – Joseph B. Murdock, United States Navy admiral and New Hampshire politician (born 1851)
- March 24 – Robert Edeson, actor (born 1868)
- March 25 – Ida Wells, African-American lynching crusader (born 1862)
- March 28 – Ban Johnson, baseball executive (born 1864)
- March 31 – Knute Rockne, football coach (born 1888)
- April 1 – Macklyn Arbuckle, actor (born 1866)
- April 9 – Nicholas Longworth, politician, Speaker of the House (born 1869)
- April 17 – Ernesto Rossi, racketeer (born 1903)
- April 26 – George Herbert Mead, philosopher (born 1863)
- May 2 – George Fisher Baker, financier and philanthropist (born 1840)
- May 14 – David Belasco, Broadway impresario, theater owner and playwright (born 1853)
- June 2 – Joseph W. Farnham, screenwriter (born 1884)
- June 8 – Virginia Frances Sterrett, artist and illustrator (born 1900)
- June 14 – Jimmy Blythe, pianist (born 1901)
- July 5 – Arthur Starr Eakle, mineralogist (born 1862)
- July 24 – George Arthur Boeckling, businessman, president of Cedar Point Pleasure Company (born 1862)
- August 6 – Bix Beiderbecke, jazz trumpeter (born 1903)
- August 27 – Francis Marion Smith, businessman (born 1846)
- August 29 – David T. Abercrombie, businessman, co-founder of Abercrombie & Fitch (born 1867)
- September 6 – Juliana Walanika, the "Hawaiian Nightingale", court singer (born 1846 in the Kingdom of Hawaii)
- September 17 – Marvin Hart, World Heavyweight Boxing Champion (born 1876)
- September 19 – David Starr Jordan, ichthyologist, educator, eugenicist, and peace activist (born 1851)
- September 30 – Jane Meade Welch, historian (born 1854)
- October 6
  - Carrie Babcock Sherman, Second Lady of the United States as wife of James S. Sherman (born 1856)
  - Albert M. Todd, businessman and politician (born 1850)
- October 7 – Daniel Chester French, sculptor (born 1850)
- October 18 – Thomas Edison, inventor (born 1847)
- October 26 – Charles Comiskey, baseball owner (born 1859)
- October 31 – Charles E. Rushmore, businessman, attorney, namesake of Mount Rushmore (born in 1857)
- November 4 – Buddy Bolden, African American musician (born 1877)
- November 6 – Jack Chesbro, baseball player and MLB Hall of Famer (born 1874)
- December 5 – Vachel Lindsay, poet (born 1879)
- December 18 – Jack Diamond, gangster (born 1897)
- December 23 – Tyrone Power Sr., actor (born 1869)
- December 26 – Melvil Dewey, librarian, inventor of Dewey Decimal Classification (born 1851)

== See also ==
- List of American films of 1931
- Timeline of United States history (1930–1949)
