= Maury Duncan =

American football player (1931–2018)

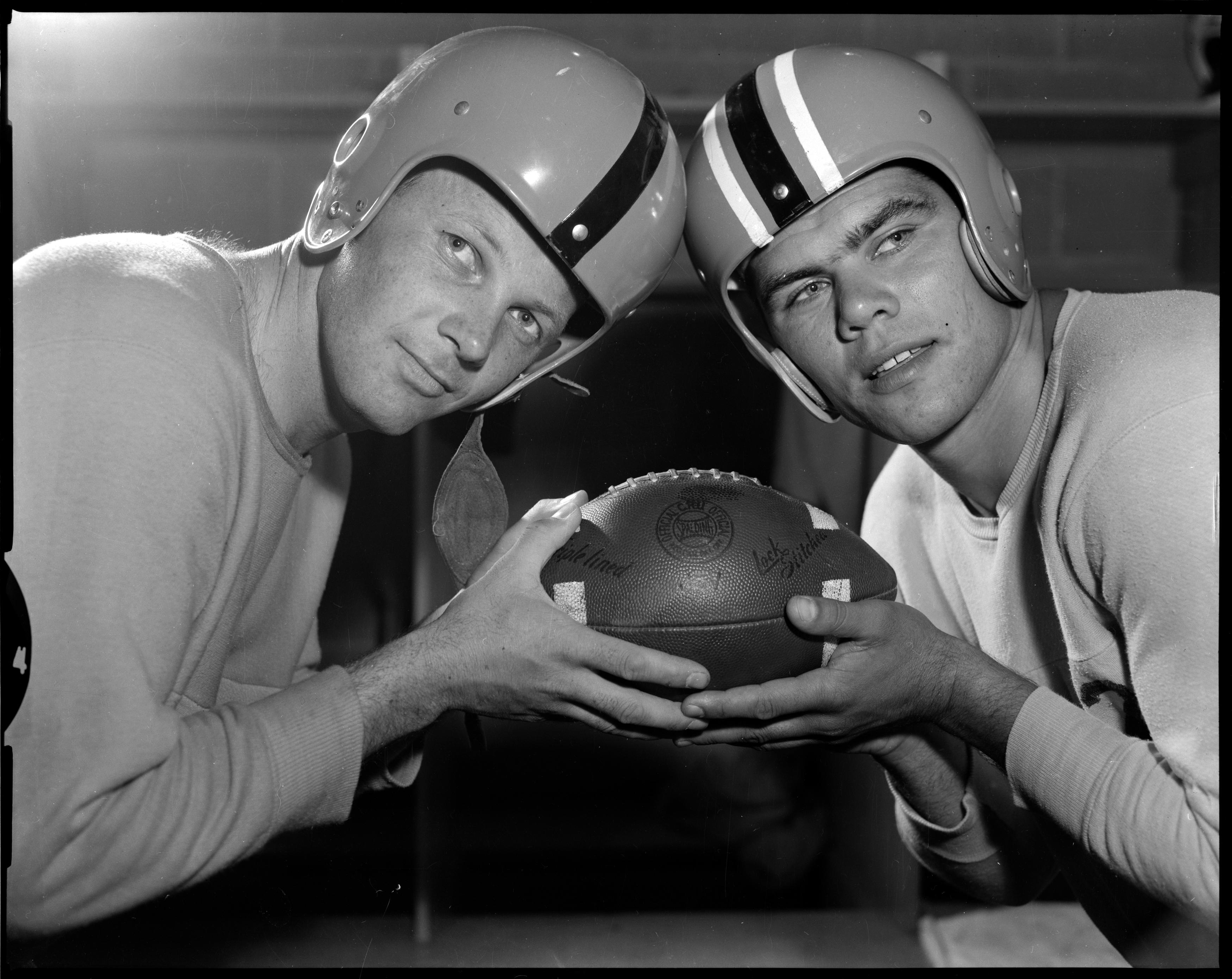
- Duncan (left) in 1957

Profile
- Position: Quarterback

Personal information
- Born: July 18, 1931; Oakland, California, U.S.
- Died: March 26, 2018 (aged 86); Fresno, California, U.S.
- Listed height: 6 ft 0 in (1.83 m)
- Listed weight: 180 lb (82 kg)

Career information
- High school: Berkeley (Berkeley, California)
- College: San Francisco State

Career history
- 1954–1955: San Francisco 49ers
- 1956–1957: BC Lions
- 1958: Calgary Stampeders
- Stats at Pro Football Reference

Maurice Perry Duncan (July 18, 1931 - March 26, 2018) was an American professional football player who was a quarterback in the National Football League (NFL) and Canadian Football League (CFL). He played for the San Francisco 49ers from 1954 to 1955, the BC Lions from 1956 to 1957, and the Calgary Stampeders in 1958.

Duncan played college football for the San Francisco State Gators.

He died on March 26, 2018 at the age of 86.
