= Lowell N. Lewis =

American plant physiology professor (1931–2020)

- Born: 1931; Pennsylvania, U.S.
- Died: 2020
- Education: B.S Pennsylvania State University (1953): M.S in horticulture, Michigan State University (1958); Ph.D in horticulture, Michigan State University (1960)
- Awards: Guggenheim Fellowship for Molecular & Cellular Biology (1967)

Lowell N. Lewis (1931–2020) was an American plant physiology professor. He began teaching plant physiology at University of California, Riverside in 1960. In 1963 he and graduate student Rashad Khalifah discovered a new kind of auxin present in citrus plants. He was promoted to associate professor of horticultural science in 1965. In 1971 he was appointed associate dean of the College of Natural and Agricultural Sciences by the dean, W. Mack Dugger. He left teaching in 1981 when he was appointed vice president of the Division of Agriculture and Natural Resources. In February 1989, he became director of biotechnology company Ecogen Inc. He continued to work for the University as Associate Vice President for Programs, Agriculture and Natural Resources until his retirement in April 1991. Lewis mentions in a self-published book that he was named coordinator of relations between the University of California and Catalonia by a 1995 bilateral academic agreement. Lewis died on July 17, 2020, at the age of 89.

== Selected published works ==
- —; R.A. Khalifah; C.W. Coggins Jr. (February 1965). "The existence of the non-indolic citrus auxin in several plant families". Phytochemistry. 4 (1): 203–205. doi:10.1016/S0031-9422(00)86166-X.
- —; Coggins, Jr., C. W.; Lbanauskas, C. K.; Dugger, Jr., W. M. (1967). "Biochemical Changes Associated with Natural and Gibberellin A_{3} Delayed Senescence in the Navel Orange Rind" (PDF). Plant and Cell Physiology. 8: 151–160. doi:10.1093/oxfordjournals.pcp.a079237.
- —; Coleman, Virginia B; Johnson, Claude W (1974). Evaluation of remote sensing in control of Pink Bollworm in cotton: Type III Final Report for period July, 1972 - October 1973. Greenbelt, Maryland: NASA. OCLC 32773678.
- —; Del Campillo, E (March 1992). "Identification and kinetics of accumulation of proteins induced by ethylene in bean abscission zones". Plant Physiology. 98 (3): 955–61. doi:10.1104/pp.98.3.955. PMC 1080293. PMID 16668770 – via NCBI.
- —; El-Ramady, Hassan R.; El-Marsafawy, Samia M. (2013). "Sustainable Agriculture and Climate Changes in Egypt". In E. Lichtfouse (ed.). Sustainable Agriculture Reviews. Vol. 12. Dordrecht: Springer Science+Business Media. pp. 41–95. doi:10.1007/978-94-007-5961-9_2. ISBN 978-94-007-5961-9. S2CID 59324741.
