= Ernesto Rossi (gangster) =

Ernest Rossi
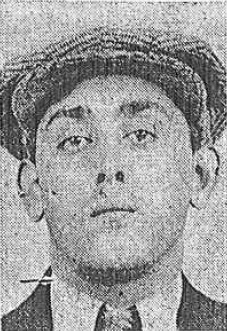
- Ernest Rossi
- Born: Ernesto Rossi; May 27, 1903; Manhattan, New York, United States
- Died: April 17, 1931 (aged 27); Brooklyn, New York, United States
- Cause of death: Gunshot
- Other name: Hoppy
- Occupation: Chauffeur
- Parent(s): Pasquale & Anna Rossi

Ernest "Hoppy" Rossi (May 27, 1903 – April 17, 1931) was an American gangster and friend and associate of Frankie Yale and Al Capone before he moved from Brooklyn to Chicago.

== Early life ==
Ernest was born on May 27, 1903, to Pasquale Rossi and Anna Costa at 250 Mott Street. Immigration ship manifests show that his parents were recent immigrants to New York City from Naples, Italy.

== Criminal career ==
According to police, Rossi had a long police record and was described as a "gangster and racketeer". He was a known follower of Frankie Yale and was a friend and associate of Al Capone when he lived in Brooklyn.

Rossi was described by police as having a police record "as long as your arm", and by August 1929, had been arrested four times without being convicted of a crime.

== Death ==
On April 17, 1931, Rossi was shot and killed in a Cadillac bearing the license plate "2-Z-2950" as it was stopped in front of the home of Police Captain Lewis J. Valentine at 1650 68th Street in Brooklyn. Witnesses stated three reports, at first taken as engine backfires, were heard and then two men leaped from the rear seat and ran down 68th Street. When found, he was slumped over the steering wheel with six gunshot wounds, all from the rear. The motor of the car was still running with clutch disengaged and one rear door hanging open, indicating the car had come to a stop before the shooting.

There is disagreement over whether Rossi's murder was a reprisal killing for the murder of Joe Masseria, boss of what is now called the Genovese crime family, two days before. Rossi was not seen as an important enough figure to be a target, but some past associates of Frankie Yale were murdered after the Masseria murder.

An alternate explanation is that the murder was the result of a personal feud with Cattilo Grimaldi of 114 12th Street. Police believe Rossi had a hand in the shooting and wounding of Cattilo a month prior to his death.
