= Don Whiteside =

Canadian civil rights activist (1931–1993)

Don Whiteside (1931 - 1993) was a sociologist, native author, Canadian civil servant, and founder and president of the Civil Liberties Association, National Capital Region. He was also an instrumental member of the Canadian Federation of Civil Liberties and Human Rights Associations, which existed from 1972-1990.

== Background ==
Don Whiteside (Sin-a-paw) was born in New York in 1931, to Thereon Harvey and Dorothy (Reid) Whiteside. In 1956, he married Alvina Helen Adams, and the couple had five children. Whiteside served in the United States military in Korea. In 1967 he completed a Ph.D. at Stanford University.

Whiteside was employed by the Canadian government, first in the Department of Regional Economic Expansion, and later in the Department of Secretary of State and the Department of Health and Welfare. He was an instructor at Manitou Community College and also a director of the Ontario Genealogical Society.

== Civil liberties ==
Whiteside was a founding member of the Civil Liberties Association, National Capital Region (CLA-NCR) which formed around 1968 in Ottawa, Canada. At the time, Whiteside was employed by the Canadian Department of the Secretary of State and involved in the development of the federal government's human rights program. Along with Reg Robson of the British Columbia Civil Liberties Association (BCCLA), Whiteside pushed for federal government funding to organize a national civil rights organization, while the Canadian Civil Liberties Association (CCLA) and its head Alan Borovoy were opposed to using government funding to form the new organization. The Canadian Federation of Civil Liberties and Human Rights Associations formed in 1972 in Montreal and included the BCCLA and Quebec's Ligue des droits et libertés as members. Don Whiteside served terms as treasurer and president of the Federation, which dissolved in 1990-1991 as Whiteside succumbed to cancer.
