= 1869 in the United States =

- Decades: 1840s; 1850s; 1860s; 1870s; 1880s
- See also: History of the United States (1865–1918); Timeline of United States history (1860–1899); List of years in the United States

Events from the year 1869 in the United States.

== Incumbents ==
=== Federal government ===
- President:

Andrew Johnson (D-Tennessee) (until March 4)
Ulysses S. Grant (R-Illinois) (starting March 4)

- Vice President:

vacant (until March 4)
Schuyler Colfax (R-Indiana) (starting March 4)

- Chief Justice: Salmon P. Chase (Ohio)
- Speaker of the House of Representatives:

Schuyler Colfax (R-Indiana) (until March 3)
Theodore Medad Pomeroy (R-New York) (March 3–4)
James G. Blaine (R-Maine) (starting March 4)

- Congress: 40th (until March 4), 41st (starting March 4)

==== State governments ====
Governors and lieutenant governors

=== Governors ===
- Governor of Alabama: William Hugh Smith (Republican)
- Governor of Arkansas: Powell Clayton (Republican)
- Governor of California: Henry Huntly Haight (Democratic)
- Governor of Connecticut: James E. English (Democratic) (until May 5), Marshall Jewell (Republican) (starting May 5)
- Governor of Delaware: Gove Saulsbury (Democratic)
- Governor of Florida: Harrison Reed (Republican)
- Governor of Georgia: Rufus Bullock (Republican)
- Governor of Illinois: Richard J. Oglesby (Republican) (until January 11), John M. Palmer (Republican) (starting January 11)
- Governor of Indiana: Conrad Baker (Republican)
- Governor of Iowa: Samuel Merrill (Republican)
- Governor of Kansas: Nehemiah Green (Republican) (until January 11), James M. Harvey (Republican) (starting January 11)
- Governor of Kentucky: John W. Stevenson (Democratic)
- Governor of Louisiana: Henry C. Warmoth (Republican)
- Governor of Maine: Joshua Chamberlain (Republican)
- Governor of Maryland: Thomas Swann (Democratic) (until January 13), Oden Bowie (Democratic) (starting January 13)
- Governor of Massachusetts: Alexander H. Bullock (Republican) (until January 7), William Claflin (Republican) (starting January 7)
- Governor of Michigan: Henry H. Crapo (Republican) (until January 6), Henry P. Baldwin (Republican) (starting January 6)
- Governor of Minnesota: William R. Marshall (Republican)
- Governor of Mississippi: Adelbert Ames (Military)
- Governor of Missouri: Thomas Clement Fletcher (Republican) (until January 12), Joseph W. McClurg (Republican) (starting January 12)
- Governor of Nebraska: David Butler (Republican)
- Governor of Nevada: Henry G. Blasdel (Republican)
- Governor of New Hampshire: Walter Harriman (Republican) (until June 3), Onslow Stearns (Republican) (starting June 3)
- Governor of New Jersey: Marcus Lawrence Ward (Republican) (until January 19), Theodore Fitz Randolph (Democratic) (starting January 19)
- Governor of New York: John Thompson Hoffman (Democratic) (starting January 1)
- Governor of North Carolina: William Woods Holden (Republican)
- Governor of Ohio: Rutherford B. Hayes (Republican)
- Governor of Oregon: George L. Woods (Republican)
- Governor of Pennsylvania: John W. Geary (Republican)
- Governor of Rhode Island: Ambrose Everett Burnside (Republican) (until May 25), Seth Padelford (Republican) (starting May 25)
- Governor of South Carolina: Robert Kingston Scott (Republican)
- Governor of Tennessee: William G. Brownlow (Republican) (until February 25), Dewitt Clinton Senter (Republican) (starting February 25)
- Governor of Texas: Elisha M. Pease (Republican) (until September 30), vacant (starting September 30)
- Governor of Vermont: John B. Page (Republican) (until October 15), Peter T. Washburn (Republican) (starting October 15)
- Governor of Virginia: Henry H. Wells (Republican) (until September 21), Gilbert Carlton Walker (Democratic) (starting September 21)
- Governor of West Virginia:
  - until February 26: Arthur I. Boreman (Republican)
  - February 26-March 4: Daniel D. T. Farnsworth (Republican)
  - starting March 4: William E. Stevenson (Republican)
- Governor of Wisconsin: Lucius Fairchild (Republican)

=== Lieutenant governors ===
- Lieutenant Governor of Alabama: Andrew J. Applegate (Republican)
- Lieutenant Governor of Arkansas: James M. Johnson (Republican)
- Lieutenant Governor of California: William Holden (Democratic)
- Lieutenant Governor of Connecticut: Ephraim H. Hyde (Democratic) (until May 5), Francis Wayland III (Republican) (starting May 5)
- Lieutenant Governor of Florida: vacant
- Lieutenant Governor of Illinois: William Bross (Republican) (until January 11), John Dougherty (Republican) (starting January 11)
- Lieutenant Governor of Indiana: William Cumback (Republican)
- Lieutenant Governor of Iowa: John Scott (Republican)
- Lieutenant Governor of Kansas: Charles Vernon Eskridge (Republican) (starting month and day unknown)
- Lieutenant Governor of Kentucky: vacant
- Lieutenant Governor of Louisiana: Oscar J. Dunn (Republican)
- Lieutenant Governor of Massachusetts: William Clafin (Republican) (until January 7), Joseph Tucker (Republican) (starting January 7)
- Lieutenant Governor of Michigan: Dwight May (Republican) (until January 6), Morgan Bates (Republican) (starting January 6)
- Lieutenant Governor of Minnesota: Thomas H. Armstrong (Republican)
- Lieutenant Governor of Missouri: George Smith (Republican) (until January 12), Edwin Obed Stanard (Republican) (starting January 12)
- Lieutenant Governor of Nevada: James S. Slingerland (political party unknown)
- Lieutenant Governor of New York: Allen C. Beach (Democratic) (starting January 1)
- Lieutenant Governor of North Carolina: Tod R. Caldwell (Republican)
- Lieutenant Governor of Ohio: John C. Lee (Republican)
- Lieutenant Governor of Rhode Island: Pardon Stevens (political party unknown)
- Lieutenant Governor of South Carolina: Lemuel Boozer (Republican)
- Lieutenant Governor of Tennessee: Dorsey B. Thomas (Democratic) (starting month and day unknown)
- Lieutenant Governor of Texas: vacant
- Lieutenant Governor of Vermont: Stephen Thomas (Republican) (until October 15), George W. Hendee (Republican) (starting October 15)
- Lieutenant Governor of Virginia: Leopold Copeland Parker Cowper (Whig) (until October 5), John F. Lewis (Republican) (starting October 5)
- Lieutenant Governor of Wisconsin: Wyman Spooner (Republican)

== Events ==
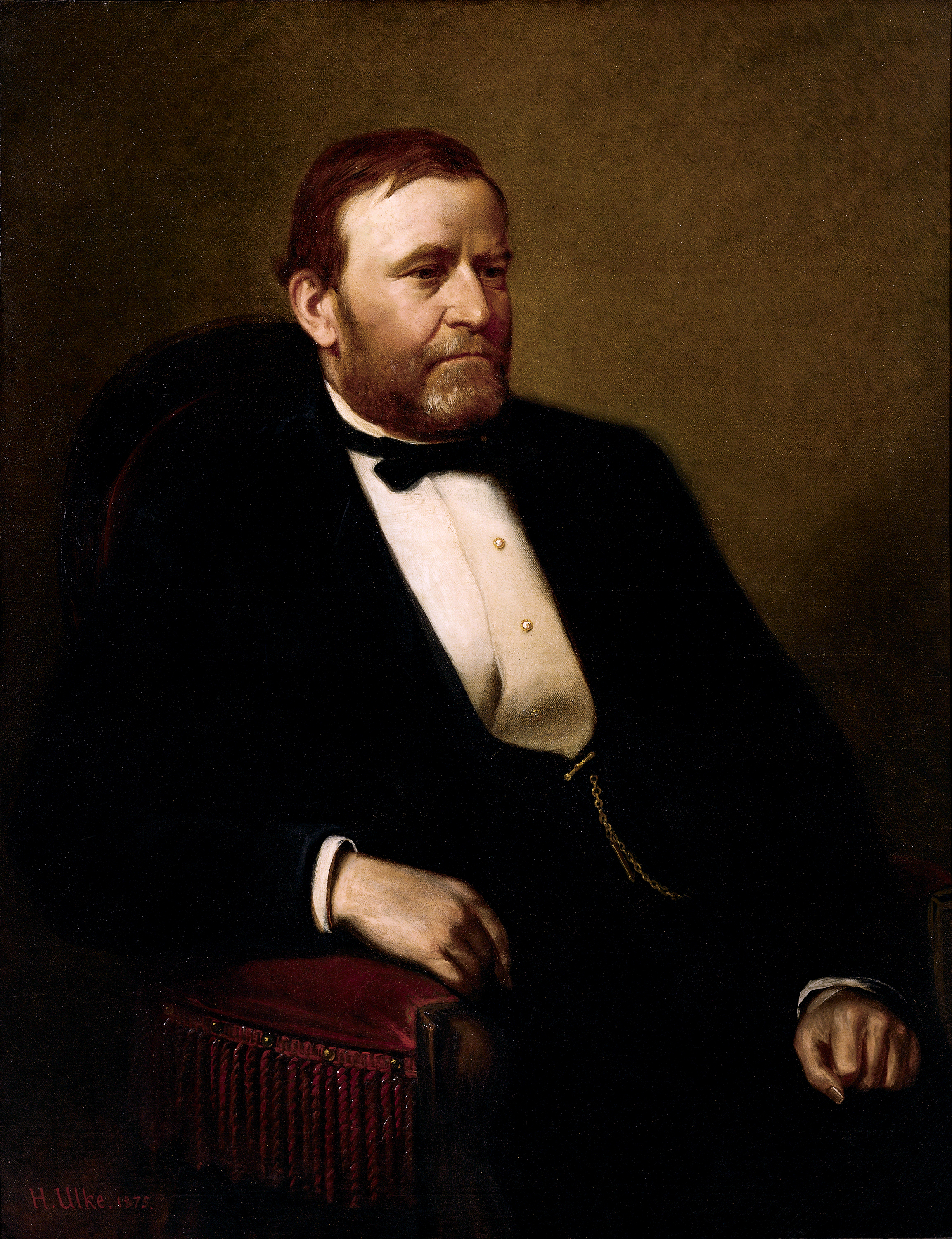
March 4: Ulysses S. Grant becomes the 18th U.S. president

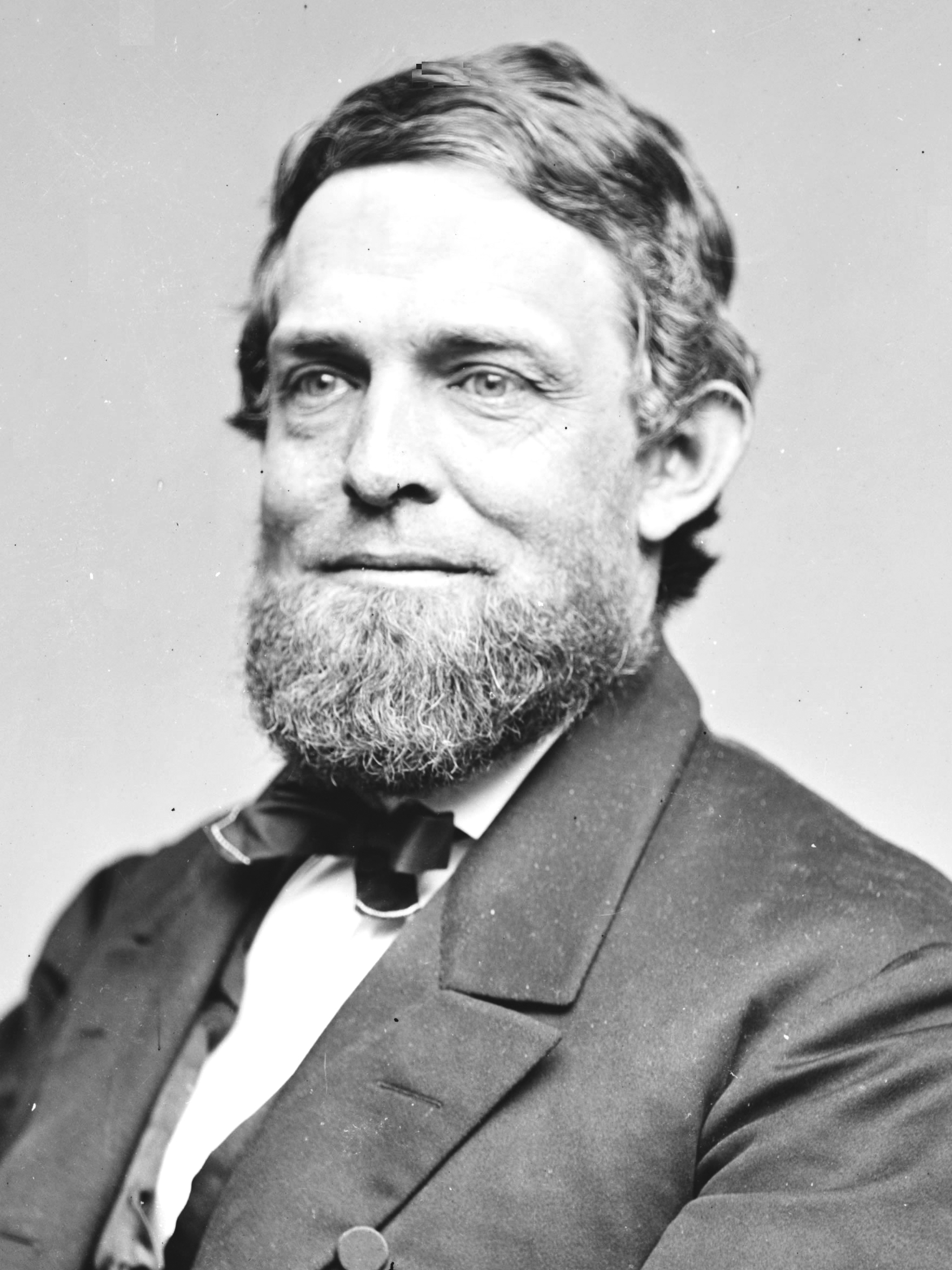
Schuyler Colfax becomes the 17th U.S. vice president

=== January–March ===
- January 1 – Sigma Nu, the first anti-hazing honor/social fraternity, is founded, at Virginia Military Institute.
- January 20 – Elizabeth Cady Stanton is the first woman to testify before the United States Congress.
- January 21 – The P.E.O. Sisterhood, a philanthropic educational organization for women, is founded at Iowa Wesleyan College in Mount Pleasant, Iowa.
- February 15 – Charges of treason against Jefferson Davis are dropped.
- March 4 – Ulysses S. Grant is sworn in as the 18th president of the United States, and Schuyler Colfax is sworn in as the 17th vice president.
- March 9 – Southern Illinois University Carbondale is established by the state legislature as Southern Illinois Normal College.

=== April–June ===
May 10: Golden spike

- April 6 – The American Museum of Natural History is founded in New York City.
- May 6 – Purdue University is founded in West Lafayette, Indiana.
- May 10 – The "golden spike" is driven marking the completion of the First transcontinental railroad in Promontory, Utah.
- May 15 – Woman's suffrage: In New York, Susan B. Anthony and Elizabeth Cady Stanton form the National Woman Suffrage Association.
- May 26 – Boston University is chartered by the Commonwealth of Massachusetts.
- June 1
  - The Cincinnati Red Stockings open the baseball season as the first fully professional baseball team.
  - Thomas Edison is granted his first patent for the Electric Vote Recorder.
- June 15 – John Wesley Hyatt patents the first plastic, Celluloid, in Albany, New York.

=== July–September ===
- July 4 – World's first rodeo held in Deer Trail, Colorado
- September 15 – Brooklyn Fire Department organized as a professional brigade.
- September 24 – Black Friday: The Fisk-Gould Scandal causes a financial panic in the United States.

=== October–December ===
December 10: "Equal Rights" motto on Wyoming's seal refers to the territory pioneering women's suffrage.

- October 5 – During construction of the Eastman tunnel in St. Anthony, Minnesota (modern-day Minneapolis), the Mississippi River breaks through the tunnel's limestone ceiling, nearly destroying Saint Anthony Falls.
- October 8 – New York Foundling Asylum incorporated.
- October 11 – Gamma Sigma becomes the first high school fraternity in North America at Brockport Normal School, Brockport, New York.
- October 16 – The Tremont House in Boston becomes the first hotel to have indoor plumbing.
- November 6 – The first intercollegiate game of American football is played: Rutgers University defeats Princeton University 6–4 in a college football game.
- December 7 – Outlaw Jesse James commits his first confirmed bank robbery, in Gallatin, Missouri.
- December 10
  - The first American chapter of Kappa Sigma is founded at the University of Virginia.
  - The Wyoming territorial legislature gives women the right to vote, one of the first such laws in the world.
- December 13: The Los Angeles Police Department is created, with city marshal William C. Warren hiring six officers.

=== Undated ===
- The H. J. Heinz Company is founded as Heinz Noble & Company in Sharpsburg, Pennsylvania.
- James Gordon Bennett, Jr. of the New York Herald asks Henry Morton Stanley to find Dr. Livingstone.
- Marcus Jastrow arrives in the United States to become rabbi of Congregation Rodeph Shalom in Philadelphia.
- A proposal to annex the Caribbean nation of Santo Domingo is proposed.

=== Ongoing ===
- Reconstruction era (1865–1877)
- Gilded Age (1869–c. 1896)

== Sport ==
- November 6 – College of New Jersey (Princeton) defeat the Rutgers Queensmen (Rutgers) 6 to 4 in New Brunswick, N.J. in what is widely considered the first ever American football game with Rutgers, The State University of New Jersey, becoming known as "The Birthplace of College Football"

== Births ==
- January 4 – Tommy Corcoran, baseball player (died 1960)
- January 10 – Rachel Davis Harris, African American librarian (died 1969)
- February 2 – Smith W. Brookhart, U.S. Senator from Iowa from 1922 to 1926 (died 1944)
- February 19 – Frederic C. Walcott, U.S. Senator from Connecticut from 1929 to 1935 (died 1949)
- February 29 – Thomas Walter Bickett, governor of North Carolina (died 1921)
- March 13 – Fairfax Harrison, lawyer and businessman (died 1938)
- April 2 – Hughie Jennings, baseball player (died 1928)
- April 4 – Mary Colter, architect (died 1958)
- April 6 – John W. Brady, Texas judge and murderer (died 1943)
- April 8 – Harvey Cushing, neurosurgeon (died 1939)
- April 9 – James Thomas Heflin, U.S. Senator from Alabama from 1920 to 1931 (died 1951)
- May 3 – Warren Terhune, U.S. Navy Commander and 13th Governor of American Samoa (died 1920)
- May 23 – Olivia Ward Bush-Banks, poet and journalist (died 1944)
- June 10 – William Kenyon, U.S. Senator from Iowa from 1909 to 1922 (died 1933)
- July 14 – Bruno Albert Forsterer, Marine Sergeant, Medal of Honor recipient (died 1957)
- July 17 – Mariette Rheiner Garner, wife of John Nance Garner, Second Lady of the United States (died 1948)
- July 20 – Howard Thurston, stage magician (died 1936)
- August 5 – J. C. W. Beckham, U.S. Senator from Kentucky from 1915 to 1921 (died 1940)
- August 9 – Annie Malone, née Turnbo, African American millionaire businesswoman, inventor and philanthropist (died 1957)
- September 11 – Charles Kilpatrick, one-legged trick cyclist (died 1927)
- November 20 – Alma Webster Hall Powell, opera singer, suffragist, and inventor (died 1930)
- December 16 – Bertha Lamme, electrical engineer (died 1943)
- December 22
  - Nathan Paine, lumber baron (died 1947)
  - Edwin Arlington Robinson, poet (died 1935)

== Deaths ==
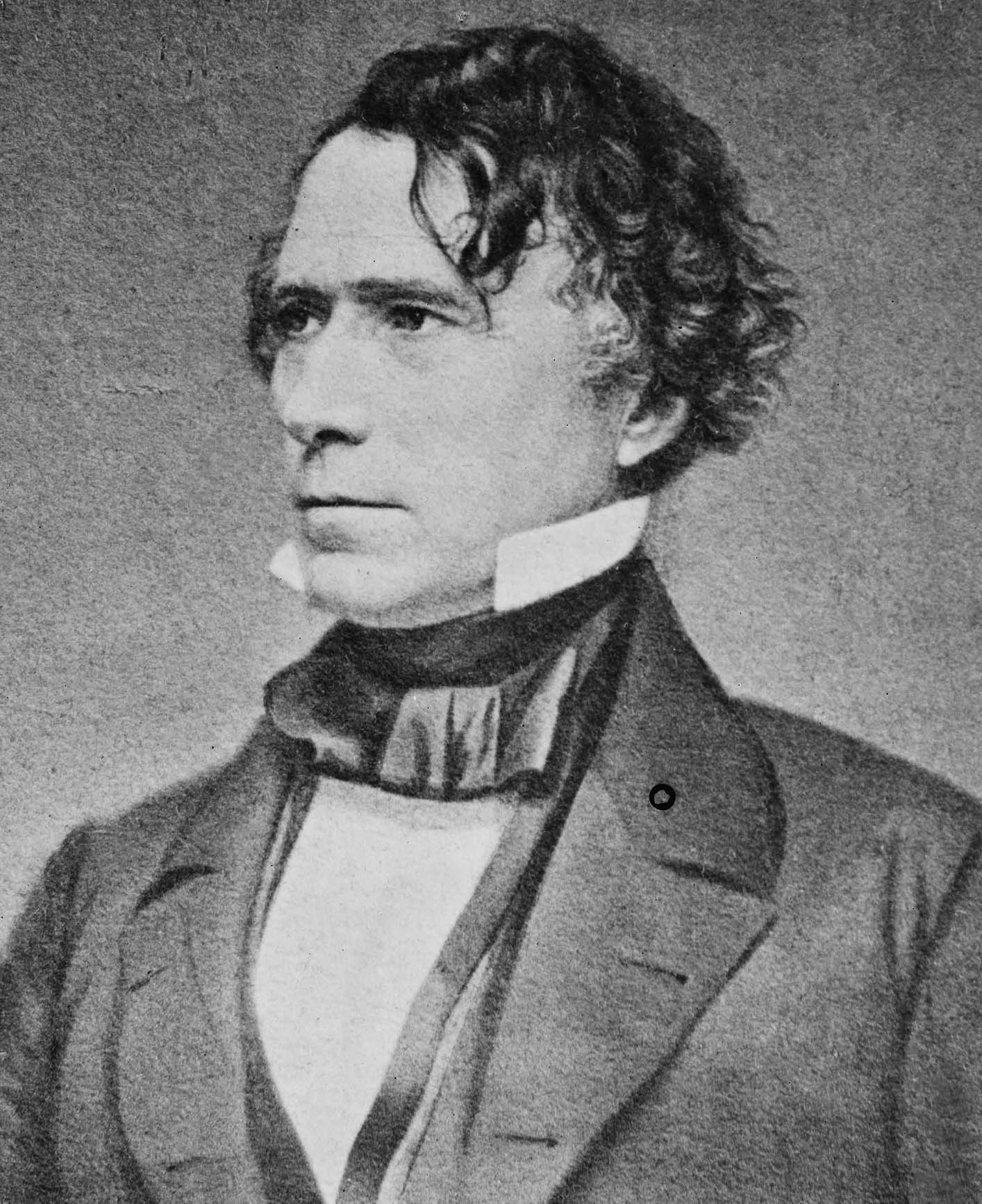
Franklin Pierce

- January 1 – Martin W. Bates, U.S. Senator from Delaware from 1857 to 1859 (born 1786)
- January 11 – Sophia Dallas, wife of George M. Dallas, Second Lady of the United States (born 1798)
- February 18 – Walker Brooke, U.S. Senator from Mississippi from 1852 to 1853 (born 1813)
- March 13 – James Guthrie, U.S. Senator from Kentucky from 1865 to 1868 (born 1792)
- April 13 – Isaiah Rogers, architect (born 1800)
- May 23 – Alexander O. Anderson, U.S. Senator from Tennessee from 1840 to 1841 (born 1794)
- July 18 – Laurent Clerc, advocate for the deaf (born 1785)
- July 22 – John A. Roebling, bridge engineer (born 1806 in Prussia)
- July 30 – Isaac Toucey, U.S. Senator from Connecticut from 1851 to 1857 (born 1792)
- August 6 – David J. Baker, U.S. Senator from Illinois in 1830 (born 1792)
- September 10 – John Bell, U.S. Senator from Tennessee from 1847 to 1859 (born 1796)
- October 8 – Franklin Pierce, 14th president of the United States from 1853 to 1857 (born 1804)
- October 15 – William Hamlin, engraver (born 1772 in Rhode Island)
- November 11 – Hiram Bingham I, missionary to Hawaii (born 1789)
- November 21 – Benjamin Fitzpatrick, U.S. Senator from Alabama from 1848 to 1849 and 1853 to 1861 (born 1802)
- December 18 – Louis Moreau Gottschalk, composer and pianist (born 1829)
- December 24 – Edwin Stanton, 27th United States Secretary of War (born 1814)
- Sandy Cornish, freed slave and farmer (born 1793)

== See also ==
- Timeline of United States history (1860–1899)
