= 1866 in the United States =

- Decades: 1840s; 1850s; 1860s; 1870s; 1880s
- See also: History of the United States (1865–1918); Timeline of United States history (1860–1899); List of years in the United States

Events from the year 1866 in the United States.

== Incumbents ==
=== Federal government ===
- President: Andrew Johnson (D-Tennessee)
- Vice President: vacant
- Chief Justice: Salmon P. Chase (Ohio)
- Speaker of the House of Representatives: Schuyler Colfax (R-Indiana)
- Congress: 39th

==== State governments ====
Governors and lieutenant governors

=== Governors ===
- Governor of Alabama: Robert M. Patton (Democratic)
- Governor of Arkansas: Isaac Murphy (Democratic)
- Governor of California: Frederick Low (Republican)
- Governor of Connecticut: William A. Buckingham (Republican) (until May 2), Joseph R. Hawley (Republican) (starting May 2)
- Governor of Delaware: Gove Saulsbury (Democratic)
- Governor of Florida: David S. Walker (Democratic)
- Governor of Georgia: Charles J. Jenkins (Democratic)
- Governor of Illinois: Richard J. Oglesby (Republican)
- Governor of Indiana: Oliver P. Morton (Republican)
- Governor of Iowa: William M. Stone (Republican)
- Governor of Kansas: Samuel J. Crawford (Republican)
- Governor of Kentucky: Thomas E. Bramlette (Democratic)
- Governor of Louisiana: James Madison Wells (Republican)
- Governor of Maine: Samuel Cony (Republican)
- Governor of Maryland: Augustus Bradford (Union) (until January 10), Thomas Swann (Democratic) (starting January 10)
- Governor of Massachusetts: John Albion Andrew (Republican) (until January 4), Alexander H. Bullock (Republican) (starting January 4)
- Governor of Michigan: Henry H. Crapo (Republican)
- Governor of Minnesota: Stephen Miller (Republican) (until January 11), William R. Marshall (Republican) (starting January 11)
- Governor of Mississippi: Benjamin G. Humphreys (Democratic)
- Governor of Missouri: Thomas Clement Fletcher (Republican)
- Governor of Nevada: Henry G. Blasdel (Republican)
- Governor of New Hampshire: Frederick Smyth (Republican)
- Governor of New Jersey: Joel Parker (Democratic) (until January 16), Marcus Lawrence Ward (Republican) (starting January 16)
- Governor of New York: Reuben Fenton (Republican)
- Governor of North Carolina: Jonathan Worth (Conservative)
- Governor of Ohio: Charles Anderson (Republican) (until January 8), Jacob Dolson Cox (Republican) (starting January 8)
- Governor of Oregon: A. C. Gibbs (Republican) (until September 12), George L. Woods (Republican) (starting September 12)
- Governor of Pennsylvania: Andrew Gregg Curtin (Republican)
- Governor of Rhode Island: James Y. Smith (Republican) (until May 29), Ambrose Everett Burnside (Republican) (starting May 29)
- Governor of South Carolina: James Lawrence Orr (Democratic)
- Governor of Tennessee: William G. Brownlow (Republican)
- Governor of Texas: Andrew J. Hamilton (Democratic) (until August 9), James W. Throckmorton (Democratic) (starting August 9)
- Governor of Vermont: Paul Dillingham (Republican)
- Governor of Virginia: Francis Harrison Pierpont (Republican)
- Governor of West Virginia: Arthur I. Boreman (Republican)
- Governor of Wisconsin: James T. Lewis (Republican) (until January 1), Lucius Fairchild (Republican) (starting January 1)

=== Lieutenant governors ===
- Lieutenant Governor of Arkansas: Calvin C. Bliss (Republican)
- Lieutenant Governor of California: Tim N. Machin (Republican)
- Lieutenant Governor of Connecticut: Roger Averill (Republican) (until May 2), Oliver F. Winchester (Republican) (starting May 2)
- Lieutenant Governor of Florida: William W. J. Kelly (Republican)
- Lieutenant Governor of Illinois: William Bross (Republican)
- Lieutenant Governor of Indiana: Conrad Baker (Republican)
- Lieutenant Governor of Iowa: Enoch W. Eastman (Republican) (until month and day unknown), Benjamin F. Gue (Republican) (starting month and day unknown)
- Lieutenant Governor of Kansas: James McGrew (Republican)
- Lieutenant Governor of Kentucky: vacant
- Lieutenant Governor of Louisiana: Albert Voorhies (Republican) (until month and day unknown), vacant (starting month and day unknown)
- Lieutenant Governor of Maryland: Christopher C. Cox (Union)
- Lieutenant Governor of Massachusetts: Joel Hayden (Republican) (until January 4), William Clafin (Republican) (starting January 4)
- Lieutenant Governor of Michigan: Ebenezer O. Grosvenor (Republican)
- Lieutenant Governor of Minnesota: Charles D. Sherwood (Republican) (until January 8), Thomas H. Armstrong (Republican) (starting January 8)
- Lieutenant Governor of Missouri: George Smith (Republican)
- Lieutenant Governor of Nevada: John S. Crosman (political party unknown)
- Lieutenant Governor of New York: Thomas G. Alvord (Republican) (until end of December 31)
- Lieutenant Governor of Ohio: vacant (until January 8), Andrew McBurney (Republican) (starting January 8)
- Lieutenant Governor of Rhode Island: Duncan Pell (political party unknown) (until May 29), William Greene (political party unknown) (starting May 29)
- Lieutenant Governor of South Carolina: W. D. Porter (Democratic)
- Lieutenant Governor of Texas: vacant (until August 9), George Washington Jones (Democratic) (starting August 9)
- Lieutenant Governor of Vermont: Abraham B. Gardner (Republican)
- Lieutenant Governor of Virginia: Leopold Copeland Parker Cowper (Whig)
- Lieutenant Governor of Wisconsin: Wyman Spooner (Republican)

== Events ==
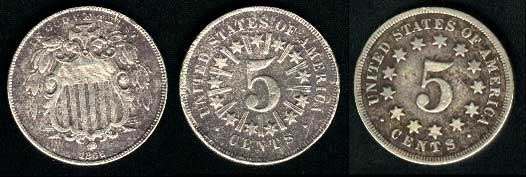
May 16 – U.S. nickel coin approved

=== January–March ===
- January – The second United States Capitol dome is completed in Washington, D.C. after 11 years of work.
- January 1
  - Fisk University, a historically black university, is established in Nashville, Tennessee.
  - The last issue of the abolitionist magazine The Liberator is published in Boston.
- February 13 – The first daylight bank robbery in United States history during peacetime takes place in Liberty, Missouri. This is considered to be the first robbery committed by Jesse James and his gang, although James role is disputed.
- February 26 – The Calaveras Skull is discovered in California. Purported to be evidence of humans in North America during the Pliocene epoch, it turns out to be a hoax.
- March 13 – The United States Congress overwhelmingly passes the Civil Rights Act of 1866, the first federal legislation to protect the rights of African-Americans; President Andrew Johnson vetoes the bill on March 27, and Congress overrides the veto on April 9.

=== April–June ===
- April 10 – The American Society for the Prevention of Cruelty to Animals (ASPCA) is founded in New York City by Henry Bergh.
- May 1–3 – Memphis riots of 1866
- May 16 – The U.S. Congress approves the minting of a nickel 5-cent coin (nickel), eliminating its predecessor, the half dime.
- June – Red Cloud's War opens.

=== July–September ===
- July 4 – The Great Fire of Portland, Maine kills two and leaves 10,000 homeless in the worst fire in an American city at this time.
- July 23 – The Judicial Circuits Act reduces the number of United States circuit courts to nine and the number of Supreme Court justices to seven.
- July 24 – Reconstruction: Tennessee becomes the first U.S. state to be readmitted to the Union following the American Civil War.
- July 25 – The U.S. Congress passes legislation authorizing the rank of General of the Army (modern-day "5-star general"); Lieutenant General Ulysses S. Grant becomes the first to have this rank.
- July 28 – The Metric Act of 1866 becomes law and legalizes the use of the metric system for weights and measures in the United States.
- July 30 – The New Orleans massacre, a deadly attack on a constitutional convention promoting black suffrage in Louisiana, is led by Mayor John Monroe.
- August 11 – First Roller rink in the United States opens to the public in Newport, Rhode Island.
- August 14–16 – The National Union Convention is held in Philadelphia with hopes to reconcile the Radical Republicans in Congress with the Reconstructionist policies of President Andrew Johnson.
- August 20 – President Johnson formally declares Civil War over.
- August 27–September 15 – President Andrew Johnson goes on his Swing Around the Circle speaking tour to gain support for his Reconstructionist policies and Democratic Party candidates in the upcoming elections.
- September 24 – Western Union Telegraph Expedition to Alaska begins its second season, the first after the death of Robert Kennicott

=== October–December ===
- October 6 – The Reno Gang commits the first train robbery in the United States, taking a total of $13,000.
- October 7–21 – The Second Plenary Council of American Roman Catholic bishops is held in Baltimore.
- November 5 – House of Representatives elections: Despite President Andrew Johnson's Swing Around the Circle tour, the Republican Party wins in a landslide.
- December 18 – The College of Wooster is founded in Ohio.

=== Undated ===
- The dime novel The Dead Letter, an American Romance by 'Seeley Regester' (Metta Victoria Fuller Victor) is published in New York City as the first full-length American work of crime fiction, having begun to appear serially in the January Beadle’s Monthly.
- The Minneapolis Milling Company, predecessor of General Mills, builds its own mills.

=== Ongoing ===
- Reconstruction Era (1865–1877)

== Births ==
- January 5 – William B. Hanna, sportswriter (died 1930)
- January 6 – Caro Dawes, wife of Charles G. Dawes, Second Lady of the United States (died 1957)
- January 15 – Horatio Dresser, New Thought religious leader and writer (died 1954)
- January 23 – Lydia Field Emmet, painter and designer (died 1952)
- January 30 – Gelett Burgess, humorist (died 1951)
- February 9 – George Ade, writer, newspaper columnist and playwright (died 1944)
- February 23 – Joseph Miller Huston, architect working in Pennsylvania (died 1940)
- March 3 – William Marmaduke Kavanaugh, U.S. Senator from Arkansas in 1913 (died 1915)
- March 17 – Pierce Butler, Associate Justice of the Supreme Court of the United States (died 1939)
- March 30 – George Van Haltren, baseball player (died 1945)
- April 13 – Butch Cassidy, born Robert Leroy Parker, outlaw (killed 1909 in Bolivia)
- April 14 – Anne Sullivan, tutor of Helen Keller (died 1936)
- April 24 – Claude C. Hopkins, advertising executive (died 1932)
- April 30 – Mary Haviland Stilwell Kuesel, pioneer dentist (died 1936)
- May 22 – Charles F. Haanel, New Thought author and businessman (died 1949)
- May 23 – Edgar J. Banks, antiquarian (died 1945)
- June 25 – Bertha Fowler, educator (died 1952)
- July 22 – Mary Onahan Gallery, critic (died 1941)
- August 1 – Claude Fayette Bragdon, architect (died 1946)
- August 8 – Matthew Henson, African-American explorer (died 1955)
- September 1 – James J. Corbett, heavyweight boxer (died 1933)
- September 2 – Hiram Johnson, U.S. Senator from California from 1917 to 1945 (died 1945)
- September 16 – Joe Vila, sportswriter (died 1934)
- September 22
  - Claude C. Hopkins, advertising executive (died 1932)
  - Witmer Stone, ornithologist and botanist (died 1939)
- September 25 – Thomas Hunt Morgan, geneticist, recipient of the Nobel Prize in Physiology or Medicine in 1933 (died 1944)
- November 1 – John Sheridan Weller, attorney and politician (died 1944)
- November 27 – George H. Reed, African-American screen actor (died 1952)
- November 28
  - Henry Bacon, Beaux-Arts architect (died 1924)
  - Sy Sanborn, sportswriter (died 1934)
  - David Warfield, stage actor (died 1951)

== Deaths ==
- January 16 – Phineas Quimby, physician (born 1802)
- January 31 – Thomas B. Marsh, leader of the Latter Day Saint movement (born 1800)
- February 13 – John Bernard Fitzpatrick, Catholic Bishop of Boston (born 1812)
- February 21 – Stephen Elliott Jr., Confederate brigadier general (born 1830)
- March 4 – Alexander Campbell, Scotch-Irish American founder of the Disciples of Christ (born 1788)
- March 9 – James F. Trotter, U.S. Senator from Mississippi in 1838 (born 1802)
- March 28 – Solomon Foot, politician (born 1802)
- April 1 – Chester Harding, portrait painter (born 1792)
- May 1 – J. B. Blanding, Freedmen's Bureau agent assassinated in Mississippi
- May 11 – George Edmund Badger, U.S. Senator from North Carolina from 1846 to 1855 (born 1795)
- May 16 – Jean Baptiste Charbonneau, son of Sacagawea, American explorer, guide, fur trapper, trader, and Military Scout. (born 1805)
- May 26 – Henry Darwin Rogers, geologist (born 1808)
- May 29 – Winfield Scott, presidential candidate in 1853, Union Civil War General (born 1786; died at West Point, New York)
- June 7 – Chief Seattle, Native American leader (born c. 1786)
- June 17 – Lewis Cass, U.S. Senator from Michigan from 1845 to 1848 and from 1849 to 1857 (born 1782)
- July 11 – James H. Lane, Union Civil War General and U.S. Senator from Kansas from 1861 to 1866 (born 1814)
- July 25 – Floride Calhoun, wife of John C. Calhoun, Second Lady of the U.S. (born 1792)
- August 1 – John Ross, Principal Chief of the Cherokee (born 1790)
- August 5 – William Burton, 39th Governor of Delaware from 1859 to 1863 (born 1789)
- September 7 – Clement Comer Clay, U.S. Senator from Alabama from 1837 to 1841 (born 1789)
- October 13 – Celadon Leeds Daboll, merchant and inventor (born 1818)
- December 20 – James Semple, U.S. Senator from Illinois from 1843 till 1847 (born 1798)

== See also ==
- Timeline of United States history (1860–1899)
