= 1868 in the United States =

- Decades: 1840s; 1850s; 1860s; 1870s; 1880s
- See also: History of the United States (1865–1918); Timeline of United States history (1860–1899); List of years in the United States

Events from the year 1868 in the United States.

== Incumbents ==
=== Federal government ===
- President: Andrew Johnson (D-Tennessee)
- Vice President: vacant
- Chief Justice: Salmon P. Chase (Ohio)
- Speaker of the House of Representatives: Schuyler Colfax (R-Indiana)
- Congress: 40th

==== State governments ====
Governors and lieutenant governors

=== Governors ===
- Governor of Alabama: Robert M. Patton (Democratic) (until July 24), William Hugh Smith (Republican) (starting July 24)
- Governor of Arkansas: Isaac Murphy (Republican) (until July 2), Powell Clayton (Republican) (starting July 2)
- Governor of California: Henry Huntly Haight (Democratic)
- Governor of Connecticut: James E. English (Democratic)
- Governor of Delaware: Gove Saulsbury (Democratic)
- Governor of Florida: David S. Walker (Democratic) (until July 4), Harrison Reed (Republican) (starting July 4)
- Governor of Georgia:
  - until January 13: Charles J. Jenkins (Democratic)
  - January 13-July 4: Thomas H. Ruger (Military)
  - starting July 4: Rufus Bullock (Republican)
- Governor of Illinois: Richard J. Oglesby (Republican)
- Governor of Indiana: Conrad Baker (Republican)
- Governor of Iowa: William M. Stone (Republican) (until January 16), Samuel Merrill (Republican) (starting January 16)
- Governor of Kansas: Samuel J. Crawford (Republican) (until November 4), Nehemiah Green (Republican) (starting November 4)
- Governor of Kentucky: John W. Stevenson (Democratic)
- Governor of Louisiana:
  - until January 8: Benjamin Franklin Flanders (Republican)
  - January 8-June 27: Joshua Baker (Democratic)
  - starting June 27: Henry C. Warmoth (Republican)
- Governor of Maine: Joshua Chamberlain (Republican)
- Governor of Maryland: Thomas Swann (Democratic)
- Governor of Massachusetts: Alexander H. Bullock (Republican)
- Governor of Michigan: Henry H. Crapo (Republican)
- Governor of Minnesota: William R. Marshall (Republican)
- Governor of Mississippi: Benjamin G. Humphreys (Democratic) (until June 15), Adelbert Ames (Military) (starting June 15)
- Governor of Missouri: Thomas Clement Fletcher (Republican)
- Governor of Nebraska: David Butler (Republican)
- Governor of Nevada: Henry G. Blasdel (Republican)
- Governor of New Hampshire: Walter Harriman (Republican)
- Governor of New Jersey: Marcus Lawrence Ward (Republican)
- Governor of New York: Reuben Fenton (Republican) (until end of December 31)
- Governor of North Carolina: Jonathan Worth (Conservative) (until July 1), William Woods Holden (Republican) (starting July 1)
- Governor of Ohio: Jacob Dolson Cox (Republican) (until January 13), Rutherford B. Hayes (Republican) (starting January 13)
- Governor of Oregon: George L. Woods (Republican)
- Governor of Pennsylvania: John W. Geary (Republican)
- Governor of Rhode Island: Ambrose Everett Burnside (Republican)
- Governor of South Carolina: James Lawrence Orr (Democratic) (until July 6), Robert Kingston Scott (Republican) (starting July 6)
- Governor of Tennessee: William G. Brownlow (Republican)
- Governor of Texas: Elisha M. Pease (Republican)
- Governor of Vermont: John B. Page (Republican)
- Governor of Virginia: Francis Harrison Pierpont (Republican) (until April 4), Henry H. Wells (Republican) (starting April 4)
- Governor of West Virginia: Arthur I. Boreman (Republican)
- Governor of Wisconsin: Lucius Fairchild (Republican)

=== Lieutenant governors ===
- Lieutenant Governor of Alabama: Andrew J. Applegate (Republican) (starting July 24)
- Lieutenant Governor of Arkansas: Calvin C. Bliss (Republican) (until July 2), James M. Johnson (Republican) (starting July 2)
- Lieutenant Governor of California: William Holden (Democratic)
- Lieutenant Governor of Connecticut: Ephraim H. Hyde (Democratic)
- Lieutenant Governor of Florida:
  - until month and day unknown: William W. J. Kelly (Republican)
  - month and day unknown: William Henry Gleason (Republican)
  - starting month and day unknown: vacant
- Lieutenant Governor of Illinois: William Bross (Republican)
- Lieutenant Governor of Indiana: William Cumback (Republican)
- Lieutenant Governor of Iowa: Benjamin F. Gue (Republican) (until January 16), John Scott (Republican) (starting January 16)
- Lieutenant Governor of Kansas: Nehemiah Green (Republican) (until November 4), Charles Vernon Eskridge (Republican) (starting November 4)
- Lieutenant Governor of Kentucky: vacant
- Lieutenant Governor of Louisiana: vacant (until month and day unknown), Oscar J. Dunn (Republican) (starting month and day unknown)
- Lieutenant Governor of Maryland: Christopher C. Cox (Unionist) (until month and day unknown), vacant (starting month and day unknown)
- Lieutenant Governor of Massachusetts: William Clafin (political party unknown)
- Lieutenant Governor of Michigan: Dwight May (Republican)
- Lieutenant Governor of Minnesota: Thomas H. Armstrong (Republican)
- Lieutenant Governor of Missouri: George Smith (Republican)
- Lieutenant Governor of Nevada: James S. Slingerland (political party unknown)
- Lieutenant Governor of New York: Stewart L. Woodford (Republican) (until end of December 31)
- Lieutenant Governor of North Carolina: Tod R. Caldwell (Republican) (starting month and day unknown)
- Lieutenant Governor of Ohio: Andrew McBurney (Republican) (until January 13), John C. Lee (Republican) (starting January 13)
- Lieutenant Governor of Rhode Island: William Greene (political party unknown) (until month and day unknown), Pardon Stevens (political party unknown) (starting month and day unknown)
- Lieutenant Governor of South Carolina: W. D. Porter (Democratic) (until July 6), Lemuel Boozer (Republican) (starting July 6)
- Lieutenant Governor of Texas: vacant
- Lieutenant Governor of Vermont: Stephen Thomas (Republican)
- Lieutenant Governor of Virginia: Leopold Copeland Parker Cowper (Whig)
- Lieutenant Governor of Wisconsin: Wyman Spooner (Republican)

== Events ==
=== January–March ===
- January 6 – Asa Mercer and a number of new "Mercer Girls" sail from Massachusetts for the West Coast, arriving in Seattle on May 23.
- January 9 – John William De Forest, writing for The Nation, calls for a more specifically American literature; the essay's title, "The Great American Novel", is the first known use of the term.
- January 11 – Wager Swayne is removed as the military governor of Alabama.
- February – The Benjamin Franklin "Z Grill" postage stamp is issued; it will be among the rarest ever.
- February 4 – William Hugh Smith is elected the 21st governor of Alabama.
- February 16 – In New York City the Jolly Corks organization is renamed the Benevolent and Protective Order of Elks (BPOE).
- February 24
  - Impeachment of Andrew Johnson: Three days after his action to dismiss Secretary of War Edwin M. Stanton, the House of Representatives votes 126 to 47 in favor of a resolution to impeach Andrew Johnson, the first of three presidents to be impeached by the full House. Johnson is later acquitted by the Senate in his impeachment trial.
  - The first parade to have floats occurs at Mardi Gras in New Orleans, Louisiana.
- March 1 – The Pi Kappa Alpha fraternity is founded at the University of Virginia.
- March 5 – A court of impeachment is organized in the United States Senate to hear charges against President Andrew Johnson in an impeachment trial.
- March 23 – The University of California is founded in Oakland, California, when the Organic Act is signed into California law.
- March 27 – The Lake Ontario Shore Railroad Company is organized in Oswego, New York.

=== April–June ===
- April 1 – The Hampton Normal and Agricultural Institute is established in Hampton, Virginia.
- April 29 – After pursuing a policy of total war on the Plain Indians, General William Tecumseh Sherman brokers the Treaty of Fort Laramie (1868).
- May 9 – The city of Reno, Nevada is founded.
- May 16 and 26 – President Andrew Johnson is acquitted during his impeachment trial by one vote in the United States Senate.
- May 30 – Memorial Day is observed in the United States for the first time (it was proclaimed on May 5 by General John A. Logan).
- June 3 – Crown Point, Indiana is incorporated a town.
- June 25 – Florida, Alabama, Louisiana, North Carolina, and South Carolina are all readmitted to the U.S.
- June 27 – Lowell, Indiana is incorporated a town.

=== July–September ===
- July 13 – William Hugh Smith is sworn in as the 21st governor of Alabama replacing Robert M. Patton.
- July 25 – Wyoming Territory is organized.
- July 27 – Expatriation Act of 1868 comes into effect, declaring there to be a right of relinquishment of United States nationality.
- July 28 – The Fourteenth Amendment to the United States Constitution is adopted, guaranteeing African Americans full citizenship and all persons in the United States due process of law.
- September – The first volume of Louisa May Alcott's novel Little Women is published.
- September 18 – The University of the South holds its first convocation in Sewanee, Tennessee.
- September 23 – Rebels (some 400–600) in the town of Lares declare Puerto Rico independent; the local militia defeats them a week later.

=== October–December ===
- October 6 – The City of New York grants Mount Sinai Hospital a 99-year lease for a property on Lexington Avenue and 66th Street, for the sum of $1.00.
- October 7 – Cornell University in Ithaca, New York, is opened, with an initial enrollment of 412 men the following day.
- October 21 – The M6.3–6.7 Hayward earthquake affects the San Francisco Bay Area with a maximum Mercalli intensity of IX (Violent), causing damage from Santa Rosa to Santa Cruz.
- October 28 – Thomas Edison applies for his first patent, the electric vote recorder.
- November 3 – 1868 United States presidential election: Ulysses S. Grant defeats Horatio Seymour in the election.
- November 25 – The Alpha Tau Omega fraternity is founded at the University of Virginia.
- November 27 – Indian Wars – Battle of Washita River: In the early morning, United States Army Lieutenant Colonel George Armstrong Custer leads an attack on a band of Cheyenne living on reservation land with Chief Black Kettle, killing 103 Cheyenne.
- December 25 – President Andrew Johnson grants unconditional pardon to all Civil War rebels.

=== Undated ===
- Maryland School for the Deaf is established.
- The Roman Catholic See of Tucson is established as the Apostolic Vicariate of Arizona in 1868, taking its territory from the former Diocese of Santa Fe. The Diocese of Tucson is canonically erected on May 8, 1897.

=== Ongoing ===
- Reconstruction era (1865–1877)

=== Births ===
- January 31 – Theodore William Richards, chemist, recipient of Nobel Prize in Chemistry in 1914 (died 1928)
- February 3 – William J. Harris, U.S. Senator from Georgia from 1919 to 1932 (died 1932)
- February 5 – Maxine Elliott, actress and businesswoman (died 1940 in France)
- February 10 – William Allen White, journalist (died 1944)
- February 16 – John Rogan, second tallest person in recorded history (died 1905)
- February 20 – John Nathan Cobb, author, naturalist, conservationist, fisheries researcher and educator (died 1930)
- February 23 – W. E. B. Du Bois, African American civil rights leader (died 1963)
- April 6 – Helen Hyde, etcher and engraver (died 1919)
- April 8 – Herbert Spencer Jennings, zoologist (died 1947)
- April 12
  - Annie Stevens Perkins, author (unknown year of death)
  - Ella Gaunt Smith, doll-maker (died 1932)
- April 21 – Alfred Henry Maurer, modernist painter (suicide 1932)
- April 28 – Hélène de Pourtalès, born Helen Barbey, Olympic sailor (died 1945 in Switzerland)
- March 22 – Robert Millikan, physicist, recipient of Nobel Prize in Physics in 1923 (died 1953)
- May 2 – Robert W. Wood, optical physicist (died 1955)
- May 10 – Ed Barrow, baseball player and manager (died 1953)
- June 4 – Thomas F. Bayard, Jr., U.S. Senator from Delaware from 1922 to 1929 (died 1942)
- June 8 – Robert Robinson Taylor, first accredited African American architect (died 1942)
- June 28 – John F. Nugent, U.S. Senator from Idaho from 1918 to 1921 (died 1931)
- July 4 – Henrietta Swan Leavitt, astronomer (died 1921)
- August 21 – Vess Ossman, ragtime banjo player (died 1923)
- August 23 – Edgar Lee Masters, poet, biographer, dramatist and lawyer (died 1950)
- September 8 – Seth Weeks, African American jazz mandolin player, composer, arranger and bandleader (died 1953)
- September 9 – Mary Hunter Austin, writer (died 1934)
- September 11 – Henry Justin Allen, U.S. Senator from Kansas from 1929 to 1931 (died 1950)
- September 22 – John T. Raulston, state judge (died 1956)
- October 8 – Coleman Livingston Blease, U.S. Senator from South Carolina from 1925 to 1931 (died 1942)
- October 10 – Anne Hazen McFarland, physician and medical journal editor (unknown year of death)
- November 3 – Harry Grant Dart, cartoonist (died 1938)
- November 22 – John Nance Garner, 32nd vice president of the United States from 1933 to 1941 (died 1967)
- November 23 – Mary Brewster Hazelton, portrait painter (died 1953)
- November 24 – Scott Joplin, African American ragtime composer and pianist (died 1917)
- December 14 – Louise Hammond Willis Snead, artist, writer, and composer (died 1958)
- December 17 – Frederic M. Sackett, U.S. Senator from Kentucky from 1925 to 1930 (died 1941)
- December 19 – Eleanor H. Porter, novelist (died 1920)
- December 25 – Eugenie Besserer, silent film actress (died 1934)
- date unknown – Luther Standing Bear, Native American film actor (died 1939)

== Deaths ==
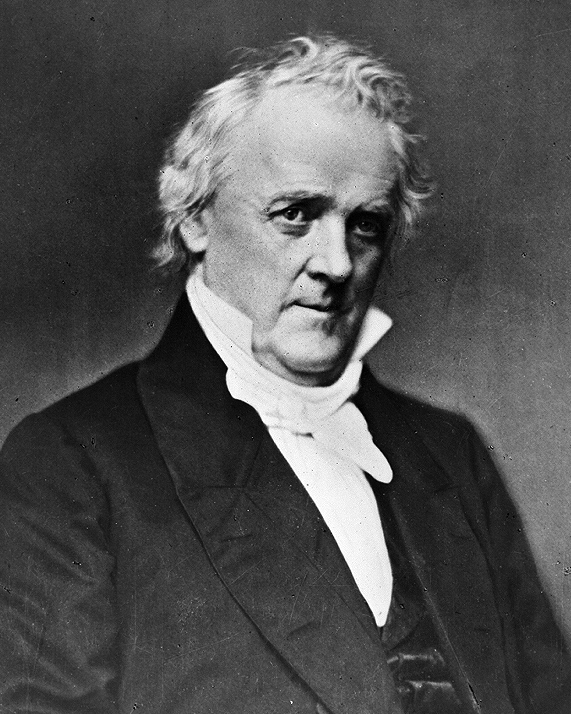
James Buchanan

- March 4
  - Richard H. Bayard, U.S. Senator from Delaware from 1841 to 1845 (born 1796)
  - Jesse Chisholm, pioneer (born c. 1805)
- May 10 – Henry Bennett, politician (born 1808)
- May 23 – Kit Carson, trapper, scout and Indian agent (born 1809)
- May 24 – Emanuel Leutze, history painter (born 1816 in Germany)
- May 31 – John J. McRae, U.S. Senator from Mississippi from 1851 to 1852 (born 1815)
- June 1 – James Buchanan, 15th president of the United States from 1857 to 1861 (born 1791)
- June 6 – Daniel Pierce Thompson, novelist and lawyer (born 1795)
- June 15 – Warren Ives Bradley, children's author (born 1847)
- June 22 – Heber C. Kimball, Latter Day Saint leader (born 1801)
- July 15 – William T. G. Morton, pioneer of anaesthesia (born 1819)
- July 7 – Edward Coles, planter, politician and the second governor of Illinois (born 1786)
- August 11 – Thaddeus Stevens, politician (born 1792)
- September 17 – Hook Nose, Northern Cheyenne warrior (born c.1823)
- September 19 – William Sprague, minister and politician from Michigan (born 1809)
- October 9 – Howell Cobb, politician (born 1815)
- November 27 – Black Kettle, Southern Cheyenne Peace Chief (born 1803)
- December 25 – Linus Yale, Jr., inventor (born 1821)

== See also ==
- Timeline of the history of the United States (1860–1899)
