= 1786 in the United States =

- Decades: 1770s; 1780s; 1790s; 1800s
- See also: History of the United States (1776–1789); Timeline of pre-United States history; List of years in the United States

Events from the year 1786 in the United States.

== Incumbents ==
- President of the Continental Congress: John Hancock (until June 6), Nathaniel Gorham (June–November)

== Events ==
=== January–March ===
- January 3 – The Treaty of Hopewell is signed between the United States of America and the Choctaw Nation.
- January 10 – The Treaty of Hopewell is signed between the United States of America and the Chickasaw Nation.
- January 31 – The Treaty of Fort Finney, is signed on January 31, 1786, between the United States and certain leaders of the Shawnee.
- March 26 – Columbia, South Carolina is chartered as the first planned city in the United States.

=== April–June ===
- June 25 – Gavriil Pribylov discovers St. George Island of the Pribilof Islands in the Bering Sea.

=== July–September ===
- August – James Rumsey tests his first steam boat in the Potomac River at Shepherdstown Virginia (now West Virginia).
- August 29 – Shays' Rebellion begins in Massachusetts.
- September 11-14 – Annapolis Convention

=== October–December ===
- November 7 – The oldest musical organization in the United States (the Stoughton Musical Society) is founded.
- December 4 – Mission Santa Barbara is founded by Father Fermín Francisco de Lasuén, becoming the 10th mission in the California mission chain.

=== Undated ===
- The town of Martinsborough, North Carolina, itself named for Royal Governor Josiah Martin in 1771, is renamed "Greenesville" in honor of United States General Nathanael Greene by the North Carolina General Assembly; the name "Greenesville" is later shortened to become Greenville.
- Beginning Point of the U.S. Public Land Survey established.
- The United States pays protection money to the Sultan of Morocco to ensure the safety of American merchantmen in the Mediterranean Sea from Barbary pirates.

=== Ongoing ===
- Articles of Confederation in effect (1781–1788)
- Northwest Indian War (1785–1795)

== Births ==
- January 7 – John Catron, lawyer and jurist (died 1865)
- January 8 – Nicholas Biddle, President of the Second Bank of the United States (died 1844)
- January 24 – Walter Forward, lawyer and politician, 15th U.S. Secretary of the Treasury from 1841 to 1843 (died 1852)
- February 24 – Martin W. Bates, U.S. Senator from Delaware from 1857 to 1859 (died 1869)
- April 6 – Robert Hanna, U.S. Senator from Indiana from 1831 to 1832 (died 1858)
- April 7 – William R. King, U.S. Senator from Alabama from 1819 to 1844; 13th vice president of the United States from March to April 1853 (died 1853)
- May 28 – Louis McLane, U.S. Senator from Delaware from 1827 to 1829 (died 1857)
- May 29 – Alexander Bryan Johnson, philosopher (died 1867)
- June 13 – Winfield Scott, general, presidential candidate (died 1866)
- August 14 – John Tipton, U.S. Senator from Indiana from 1832 to 1839 (died in 1839)
- August 17 – Davy Crockett, frontiersman (died 1836)
- September 10 – William Mason, New York politician (died 1860)
- September 22 – William Kelly, U.S. Senator from Alabama from 1822 to 1825 (died 1834)
- November 22 – Cyrus Kingsbury, Congregationalist missionary to Cherokee and Choctaw tribes (died 1870 in Choctaw Nation, Indian Territory)
- December 12 – William L. Marcy, statesman (died 1857)
- December 15 – Edward Coles, planter, politician and 2nd governor of Illinois (died 1868)

== Deaths ==
- January 14 – Meshech Weare, Governor of New Hampshire (born 1713)
- March 11 – Charles Humphreys, delegate to the Continental Congress (born 1714)
- June 19 – Nathanael Greene, major general of the Continental Army in the American Revolutionary War (born 1742)
- October 25 – Charles Mason, surveyor (born 1728 in Great Britain)
- December – Nonhelema, Shawnee chieftess, sister of Cornstalk

== See also ==
- Prussian scheme
- Timeline of the American Revolution (1760–1789)
