= 1867 in the United States =

- Decades: 1840s; 1850s; 1860s; 1870s; 1880s
- See also: History of the United States (1865–1918); Timeline of United States history (1860–1899); List of years in the United States

Events from the year 1867 in the United States.

== Incumbents ==
=== Federal government ===
- President: Andrew Johnson (D-Tennessee)
- Vice President: vacant
- Chief Justice: Salmon P. Chase (Ohio)
- Speaker of the House of Representatives: Schuyler Colfax (R-Indiana)
- Congress: 39th (until March 4), 40th (starting March 4)

==== State governments ====
Governors and lieutenant governors

=== Governors ===
- Governor of Alabama: Robert M. Patton (Democratic)
- Governor of Arkansas: Isaac Murphy (Democratic)
- Governor of California: Frederick Low (Republican) (until December 5), Henry Huntly Haight (Democratic) (starting December 5)
- Governor of Connecticut: Joseph R. Hawley (Republican) (until May 1), James E. English (Democratic) (starting May 1)
- Governor of Delaware: Gove Saulsbury (Democratic)
- Governor of Florida: David S. Walker (Democratic)
- Governor of Georgia: Charles J. Jenkins (Democratic)
- Governor of Illinois: Richard J. Oglesby (Republican)
- Governor of Indiana: Oliver P. Morton (Republican) (until January 23), Conrad Baker (Republican) (starting January 23)
- Governor of Iowa: William M. Stone (Republican)
- Governor of Kansas: Samuel J. Crawford (Republican)
- Governor of Kentucky:
  - until September 3: Thomas E. Bramlette (Democratic)
  - September 3-8: John L. Helm (Democratic)
  - starting September 8: John W. Stevenson (Democratic)
- Governor of Louisiana: James Madison Wells (Republican) (until June 3), Benjamin Franklin Flanders (Republican) (starting June 6)
- Governor of Maine: Samuel Cony (Republican) (until January 2), Joshua Chamberlain (Republican) (starting January 2)
- Governor of Maryland: Thomas Swann (Democratic)
- Governor of Massachusetts: Alexander H. Bullock (Republican)
- Governor of Michigan: Henry H. Crapo (Republican)
- Governor of Minnesota: William R. Marshall (Republican)
- Governor of Mississippi: Benjamin G. Humphreys (Democratic)
- Governor of Missouri: Thomas Clement Fletcher (Republican)
- Governor of Nebraska: Alvin Saunders (Republican) (until March 1), David Butler (Republican) (starting March 1)
- Governor of Nevada: Henry G. Blasdel (Republican)
- Governor of New Hampshire: Frederick Smyth (Republican) (until June 6), Walter Harriman (Republican) (starting June 6)
- Governor of New Jersey: Marcus Lawrence Ward (Republican)
- Governor of New York: Reuben Fenton (Republican)
- Governor of North Carolina: Jonathan Worth (Conservative)
- Governor of Ohio: Jacob Dolson Cox (Republican)
- Governor of Oregon: George L. Woods (Republican)
- Governor of Pennsylvania: Andrew Gregg Curtin (Republican) (until January 15), John W. Geary (Republican) (starting January 15)
- Governor of Rhode Island: Ambrose Everett Burnside (Republican)
- Governor of South Carolina: James Lawrence Orr (Democratic)
- Governor of Tennessee: William G. Brownlow (Republican)
- Governor of Texas: James W. Throckmorton (Democratic) (until August 8), Elisha M. Pease (Republican) (starting August 8)
- Governor of Vermont: Paul Dillingham (Republican) (until October 13), John B. Page (Republican) (starting October 13)
- Governor of Virginia: Francis Harrison Pierpont (Republican)
- Governor of West Virginia: Arthur I. Boreman (Republican)
- Governor of Wisconsin: Lucius Fairchild (Republican)

=== Lieutenant governors ===
- Lieutenant Governor of Arkansas: Calvin C. Bliss (Republican)
- Lieutenant Governor of California: Tim N. Machin (Republican) (until December 5), William Holden (Democratic) (starting December 5)
- Lieutenant Governor of Connecticut: Oliver F. Winchester (Republican) (until May 1), Ephraim H. Hyde (Democratic) (starting May 1)
- Lieutenant Governor of Florida: William W. J. Kelly (Republican)
- Lieutenant Governor of Illinois: William Bross (Republican)
- Lieutenant Governor of Indiana: Conrad Baker (Republican) (until January 23), William Cumback (Republican) (starting January 23)
- Lieutenant Governor of Iowa: Benjamin F. Gue (Republican)
- Lieutenant Governor of Kansas: James McGrew (Republican) (until month and day unknown), Nehemiah Green (Republican) (starting month and day unknown)
- Lieutenant Governor of Kentucky:
  - until September 3: vacant
  - September 3-8: John White Stevenson (political party unknown)
  - starting September 8: vacant
- Lieutenant Governor of Louisiana: vacant
- Lieutenant Governor of Maryland: Christopher C. Cox (Unionist)
- Lieutenant Governor of Massachusetts: William Clafin (political party unknown)
- Lieutenant Governor of Michigan: Ebenezer O. Grosvenor (Republican) (until month and day unknown), Dwight May (Republican) (starting month and day unknown)
- Lieutenant Governor of Minnesota: Thomas H. Armstrong (Republican)
- Lieutenant Governor of Missouri: George Smith (Republican)
- Lieutenant Governor of Nevada: John S. Crosman (political party unknown) (until month and day unknown), James S. Slingerland (political party unknown) (starting month and day unknown)
- Lieutenant Governor of New York: Stewart L. Woodford (Republican) (starting January 1)
- Lieutenant Governor of Ohio: Andrew McBurney (Republican)
- Lieutenant Governor of Rhode Island: William Greene (political party unknown)
- Lieutenant Governor of South Carolina: W. D. Porter (Democratic)
- Lieutenant Governor of Texas: George Washington Jones (Democratic) (until August 8), vacant (starting August 8)
- Lieutenant Governor of Vermont: Abraham B. Gardner (Republican) (until October 13), Stephen Thomas (Republican) (starting October 13)
- Lieutenant Governor of Virginia: Leopold Copeland Parker Cowper (Whig)
- Lieutenant Governor of Wisconsin: Wyman Spooner (Republican)

== Events ==
=== January–March ===
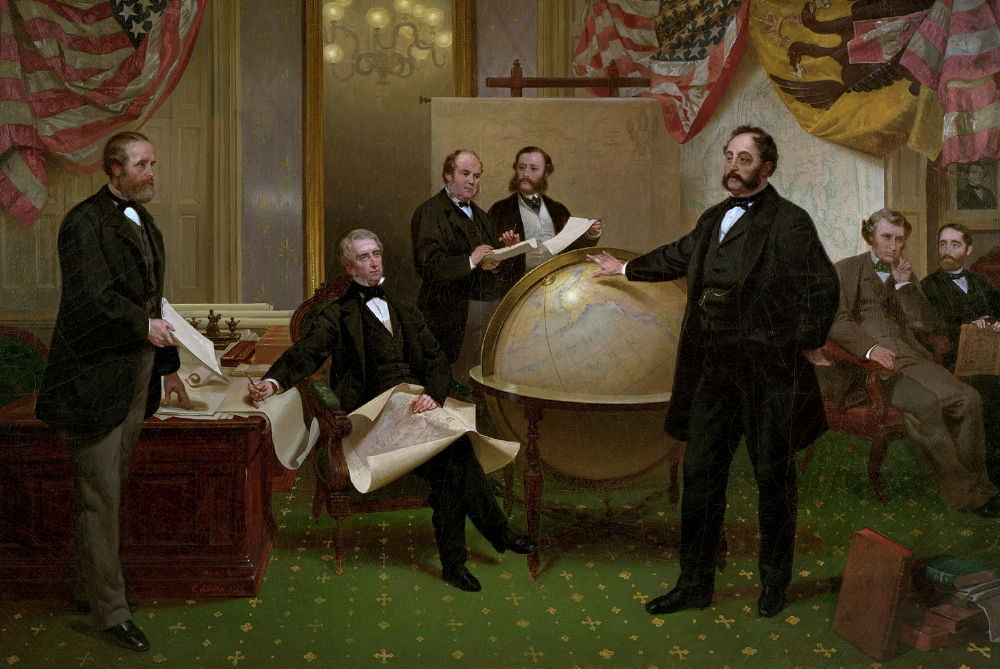
March 30: Alaska Purchase

- January 1 – The John A. Roebling Suspension Bridge opens between Cincinnati, Ohio and Covington, Kentucky, becoming the longest suspension bridge in the world.
- January 7 – Kingstree jail fire kills 22 in South Carolina.
- January 8 – African-American men are granted the right to vote in the District of Columbia under the District of Columbia Suffrage Act.
- January 11 – Tennessee state senator Almon Case is assassinated in Obion County.
- February 7 – West Virginia University is established in Morgantown, West Virginia.
- March – The University of Illinois at Urbana–Champaign is established (it opens for classes on March 2, 1868).
- March 1 – Nebraska is admitted as the 37th U.S. state (see History of Nebraska).
- March 2 – Wager Swayne is sworn in as the military governor of Alabama effectively.

=== April–June ===
- May 28 – Alaska is purchased for $7.2 million from Alexander II of Russia, about 2 cent/acre ($4.19/km²), by United States Secretary of State William H. Seward. The news media call this "Seward's Folly."
- June 15 – The Atlantic Cable Quartz Lode mine is named in Montana.
- June 29 – Kidder massacre: A Sioux and Cheyenne war party kills U.S. Second Lieutenant Lyman Kidder, along with an Indian scout and ten enlisted men in Kansas.

=== July–September ===
- July 2 – The first elevated railroad in the U.S. begins service in New York.
- July 17 – In Boston, Massachusetts, the Harvard School of Dental Medicine is established as the first dental school in the United States.
- September 30 – The United States takes control of Midway Island.

=== October–December ===
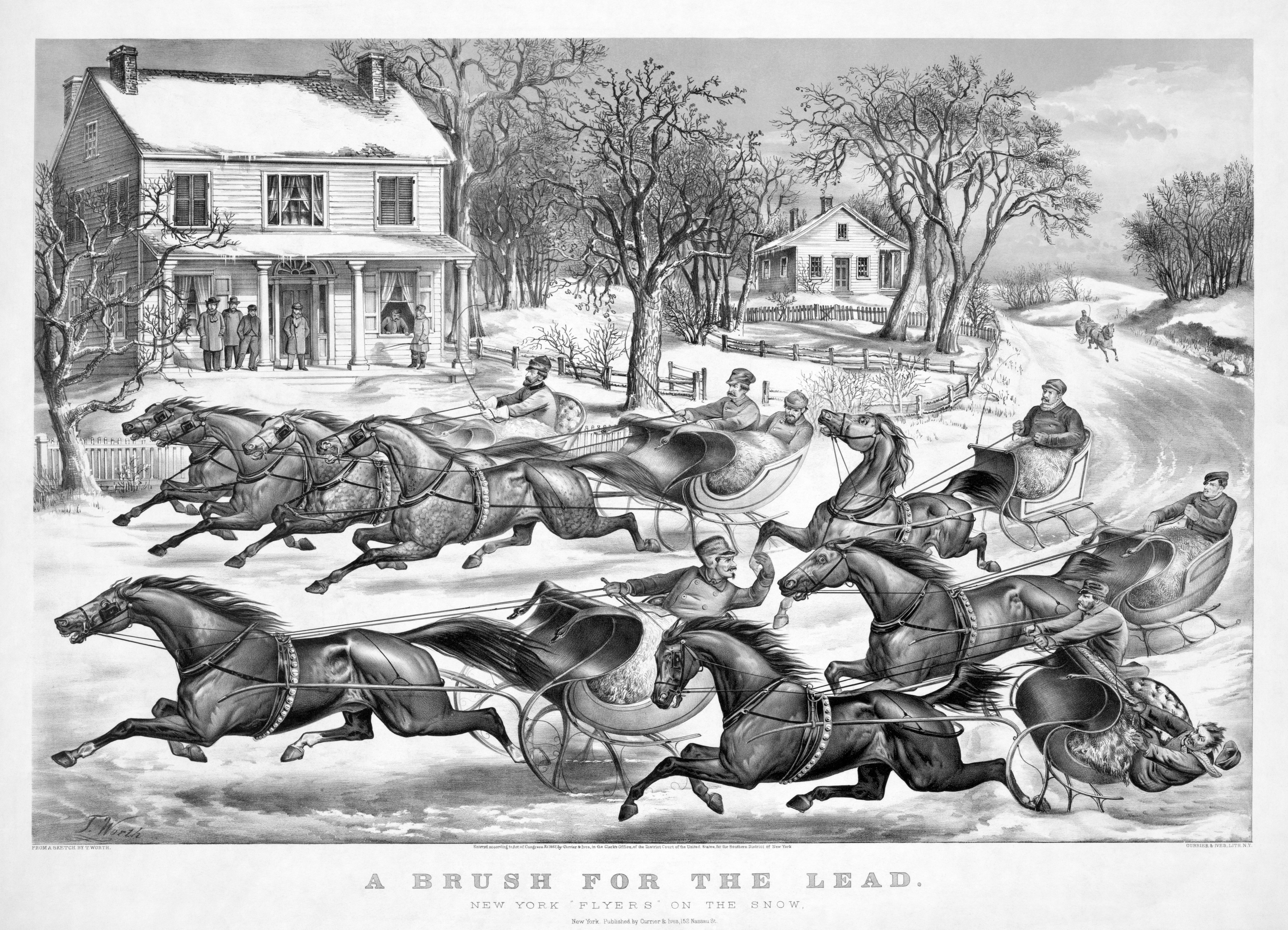
"A Brush for the Lead", lithograph by Currier and Ives, 1867

- October 18 – U.S. takes formal possession of Alaska from Russia, paying $7.2 million.
- October 21 – Manifest Destiny – Medicine Lodge Treaty: Near Medicine Lodge Creek, Kansas, a landmark treaty is signed by southern Great Plains Indian leaders. The treaty requires Native American Plains tribes to relocate to a reservation in western Oklahoma.
- November 15 – Former Minnesota farmer Oliver Hudson Kelley founds the Order of the Patrons of Husbandry (better known today as The Grange).
- December 2 – In a New York City theater, British author Charles Dickens gives his first public reading in the United States.
- December 18 – 49 people are killed in a train crash in Angola, New York.

=== Undated ===
- Yellow fever kills 3,093 in New Orleans.
- At historic Fountain Point, Michigan, an artesian water spring gushes continuously until the present day.
- 1867–1873 – Chinese, Scandinavian and Irish immigrants lay 30,000 miles (48,000 km) of railroad tracks in the United States.
- Clarke School for the Deaf in Northampton, Massachusetts opens its doors for the first time, becoming the first school for the deaf in the United States to teach deaf children how to communicate with others using the "oral method".

=== Ongoing ===
- Reconstruction era (1865–1877)

== Births ==
- January 1 – Lew Fields, vaudeville performer (died 1941)
- January 8 – Emily Greene Balch, writer and pacifist, recipient of the Nobel Peace Prize (died 1961)
- January 14 – James H. Hughes, U.S. Senator from Delaware from 1937 till 1943 (died 1953)
- January 17 – Louise Upton Brumback, landscape painter (died 1929)
- February 3 – Charles Henry Turner, African American entomologist (died 1923)
- February 7 – Laura Ingalls Wilder, novelist (died 1957)
- February 8
  - William Michael Crose, U.S. Navy commander and Governor of American Samoa (died 1929)
  - Kirtland I. Perky, U.S. Senator from Idaho from 1912 till 1913 (died 1939)
- February 27 – Irving Fisher, economist (died 1947)
- March 4 – Charles Pelot Summerall, U.S. Army general (died 1955)
- March 6 – Samuel Cody, aviation pioneer (died 1913)
- March 10 – Lillian Wald, nurse (died 1940)
- March 21 – Florenz Ziegfeld, Jr., theatrical producer (died 1932)
- March 25 – Gutzon Borglum, artist, sculptor, creator of the Mount Rushmore National Memorial (died 1941)
- March 29 – Cy Young, Major League Baseball pitcher (died 1955)
- April 11 – Mark Keppel, Superintendent of Los Angeles County Schools (died 1928)
- April 16 – Wilbur Wright, aviation pioneer (died 1912)
- May 21 – Anne Walter Fearn (died 1939), physician.* May 21 – Augustus Owsley Stanley, U.S. Senator from Kentucky from 1919 to 1925 (died 1958)
- May 29 – Charles A. Rawson, U.S. Senator from Iowa in 1922 (died 1936)
- June 6 – David T. Abercrombie, businessman, co-founder of Abercrombie & Fitch (died 1931)
- June 8 – Frank Lloyd Wright, architect (died 1959)
- June 14 – John Englehart, Northwest Frontier painter (died 1915)
- July 25 – Alexander Rummler, painter (died 1959)
- July 31 – S. S. Kresge, retailer (died 1966)
- September 5 – Amy Beach, classical composer and pianist (died 1944)
- October 6 – George Horace Lorimer, newspaper editor (died 1937)
- October 12 – Helen Gilman Noyes Brown, philanthropist (died 1942)
- October 21 – Aldred Scott Warthin, cancer geneticist (died 1931)
- October 31 – David Graham Phillips, journalist and novelist (died 1911)
- November 16 – William F. Kirby, U.S. Senator from Arkansas from 1916 till 1921 (died 1934)
- November 24
  - Possible date – Scott Joplin, ragtime composer (died 1917)
  - Frank L. Smith, elected U.S. Senator from Illinois in 1926 (died 1950)
- December 23 – Madam C. J. Walker, born Sarah Breedlove, African American entrepreneur and philanthropist (died 1919)
- December 30 – Simon Guggenheim, U.S. Senator from Colorado from 1907 till 1913 (died 1941)

== Deaths ==
- January 20 – Nathaniel Parker Willis, author, poet and editor (born 1806)
- February 2 – Forceythe Willson, poet (born 1837)
- March 6 – Charles Farrar Browne ("Artemus Ward"), humorist (born 1834) (tuberculosis)
- March 16 – Benjamin Hanby, songwriter (born 1833) (tuberculosis)
- March 29 – George R. Riddle, U.S. Senator from Delaware from 1864 to 1867 (born 1817)
- April 3 – George W. Randolph, lawyer, planter, Confederate general, 3rd Confederate States Secretary of War (born 1818)
- May 11 – Joseph A. Wright, U.S. Senator from Indiana from 1862 to 1863 (born 1810)
- May 27 – Thomas Bulfinch, collector of myths and legends (born 1796)
- July 3 – Lazarus W. Powell, U.S. Senator from Kentucky from 1859 to 1865 (born 1812)
- July 31 – Catharine Sedgwick, novelist (born 1789)
- September 3 – James A. McDougall, U.S. Senator from California from 1861 to 1867 (born 1817)
- September 23 – Michael O'Laughlen, Conspirator in the Assassination of Abraham Lincoln (born 1840) (yellow fever)
- September 26 – James Ferguson, Scottish-born astronomer and engineer (born 1797)
- September 29 – Sterling Price, 11th governor of Missouri, United States Army brigadier general in the Mexican–American War, Confederate Army major general in the American Civil War (born 1809)
- October 7 – Henry Timrod, poet (born 1829) (tuberculosis)
- November 19 – Fitz-Greene Halleck, poet (born 1790)
- December 3 – Margaret Lea Houston, First Lady of the Republic of Texas (born 1819)

== See also ==
- Timeline of United States history (1860–1899)
