= 1852 in the United States =

- Decades: 1830s; 1840s; 1850s; 1860s; 1870s
- See also: History of the United States (1849–1865); Timeline of United States history (1820–1859); List of years in the United States

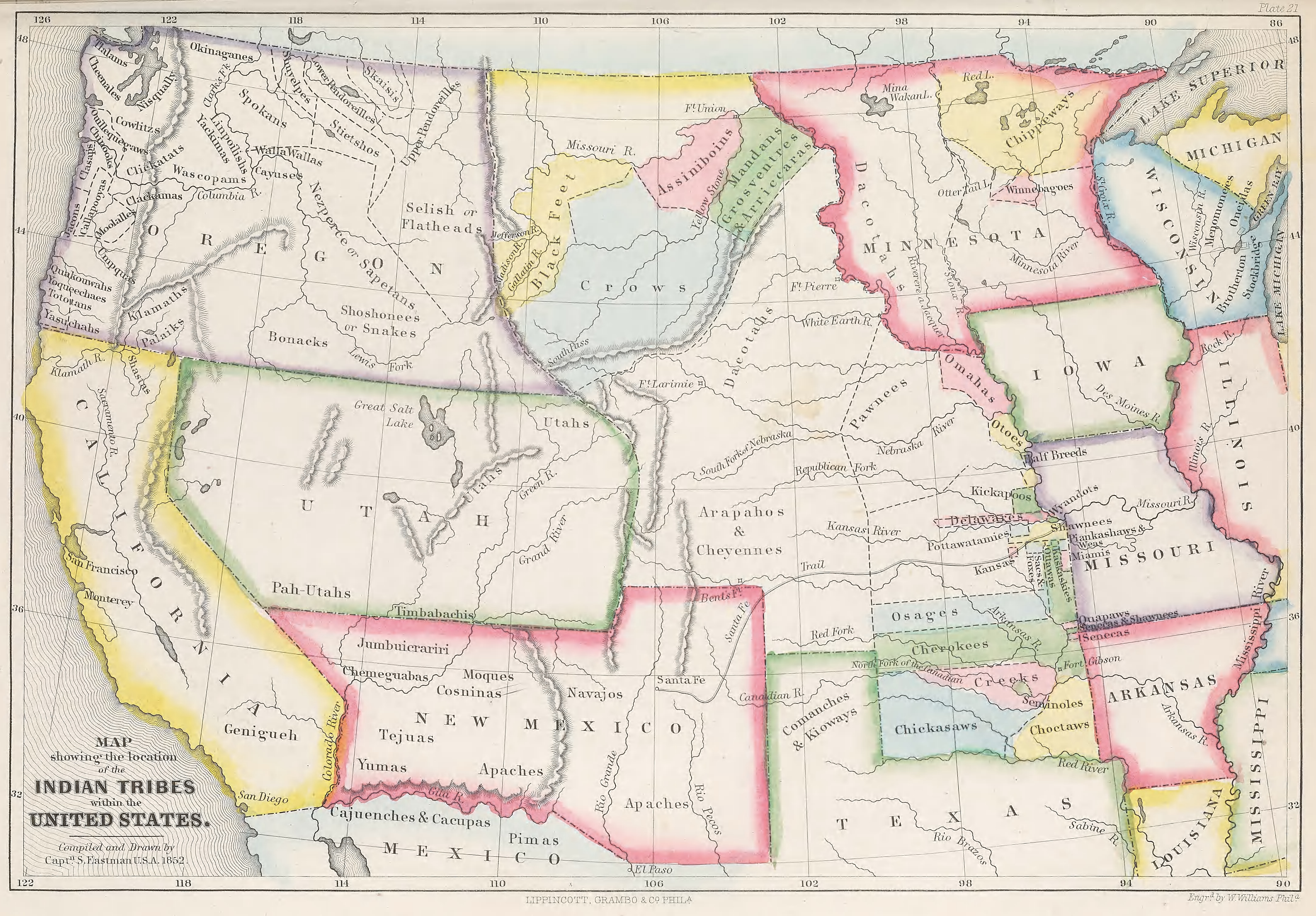
Seth Eastman's 1852 map of Indian tribes in the west

Events from the year 1852 in the United States.

== Incumbents ==
=== Federal government ===
- President: Millard Fillmore (W-New York)
- Vice President: vacant
- Chief Justice: Roger B. Taney (Maryland)
- Speaker of the House of Representatives: Linn Boyd (D-Kentucky)
- Congress: 32nd

==== State governments ====
Governors and lieutenant governors

=== Governors ===
- Governor of Alabama: Henry W. Collier (Democratic)
- Governor of Arkansas: John Selden Roane (Democratic) (until November 15), Elias Nelson Conway (Democratic) (starting November 15)
- Governor of California: John McDougall (Democratic) (until January 8), John Bigler (Democratic) (starting January 8)
- Governor of Connecticut: Thomas H. Seymour (Democratic)
- Governor of Delaware: William H. H. Ross (Democratic)
- Governor of Florida: Thomas Brown (Whig)
- Governor of Georgia: Howell Cobb (Democratic)
- Governor of Illinois: Augustus C. French (Democratic)
- Governor of Indiana: Joseph A. Wright (Democratic)
- Governor of Iowa: Stephen P. Hempstead (Democratic)
- Governor of Kentucky: Lazarus W. Powell (Democratic)
- Governor of Louisiana: Joseph Marshall Walker (Democratic)
- Governor of Maine: John Hubbard (Democratic)
- Governor of Maryland: Enoch Louis Lowe (Democratic)
- Governor of Massachusetts: George S. Boutwell (Democratic)
- Governor of Michigan: John S. Barry (Democratic) (until January 1), Robert McClelland (Democratic) (starting January 1)
- Governor of Mississippi: James Whitfield (Democratic) (until January 10), Henry S. Foote (Democratic) (starting January 10)
- Governor of Missouri: Austin Augustus King (Democratic)
- Governor of New Hampshire: Samuel Dinsmoor, Jr. (Democratic) (until June 3), Noah Martin (Democratic) (starting June 3)
- Governor of New Jersey: George F. Fort (Democratic)
- Governor of New York: Washington Hunt (Whig) (until end of December 31)
- Governor of North Carolina: David Settle Reid (Democratic)
- Governor of Ohio: Reuben Wood (Democratic)
- Governor of Pennsylvania: William F. Johnston (Whig) (until January 20), William Bigler (Democratic) (starting January 20)
- Governor of Rhode Island: Philip Allen (Democratic)
- Governor of South Carolina: John Hugh Means (Democratic) (until December 9), John Lawrence Manning (Democratic) (starting December 9)
- Governor of Tennessee: William B. Campbell (Whig)
- Governor of Texas: Peter Hansborough Bell (Democratic)
- Governor of Vermont: Charles K. Williams (Whig) (until October), Erastus Fairbanks (Whig) (starting October)
- Governor of Virginia: John B. Floyd (Democratic) (until January 16), Joseph Johnson (Democratic) (starting January 16)
- Governor of Wisconsin: Nelson Dewey (Democratic) (until January 5), Leonard J. Farwell (Whig) (starting January 5)

=== Lieutenant governors ===
- Lieutenant Governor of California: David C. Broderick (Democratic) (until January 8), Samuel Purdy (Democratic) (starting January 8)
- Lieutenant Governor of Connecticut: Green Kendrick (Whig) (until month and day unknown), Charles H. Pond (Democratic) (starting month and day unknown)
- Lieutenant Governor of Illinois: William McMurtry (Democratic)
- Lieutenant Governor of Indiana: James H. Lane (Democratic)
- Lieutenant Governor of Kentucky: John Burton Thompson (political party unknown)
- Lieutenant Governor of Louisiana: Jean Baptiste Plauche (Whig)
- Lieutenant Governor of Massachusetts: Henry W. Cushman (political party unknown)
- Lieutenant Governor of Michigan: vacant (until month and day unknown), Calvin Britain (Democratic) (starting month and day unknown)
- Lieutenant Governor of Missouri: Thomas Lawson Price (Democratic)
- Lieutenant Governor of New York: Sanford E. Church (Democratic)
- Lieutenant Governor of Ohio: William Medill (Democratic) (starting January 12)
- Lieutenant Governor of Rhode Island: William Beach Lawrence (political party unknown) (until month and day unknown), Samuel G. Arnold (political party unknown) (starting month and day unknown)
- Lieutenant Governor of South Carolina: Joshua John Ward (Democratic) (until December 9), James Irby (Democratic) (starting December 9)
- Lieutenant Governor of Texas: James Wilson Henderson (Democratic)
- Lieutenant Governor of Vermont: Julius Converse (Whig) (until October), William Kittredge (Whig) (starting October)
- Lieutenant Governor of Virginia: Shelton Leake (Democratic) (starting January 16)
- Lieutenant Governor of Wisconsin: Samuel W. Beall (Democratic) (until January 5), Timothy Burns (Democratic) (starting January 5)

== Events ==
- January 15 – Nine men representing various Hebrew charitable organizations come together to form what will become the Mount Sinai Hospital in New York City.
- January 21 – Westminster College, a Presbyterian liberal arts school, is founded New Wilmington, PA.
- February 16 – The Studebaker Brothers Wagon Company, precursor of the automobile manufacturer, is established.
- February 19 – The Phi Kappa Psi fraternity is founded at Jefferson College in Canonsburg, Pennsylvania.
- March 2 – The first American experimental steam fire engine is tested.
- March 4 – The Phi Mu fraternity is established at Wesleyan College.
- March 20 – Uncle Tom's Cabin an antislavery novel by Harriet Beecher Stowe is first published in book form, in Boston.
- April 23 – More than 150 Wintu people are killed in California by a militia under the guidance of Trinity County sheriff William H. Dixon in the Bridge Gulch Massacre.
- July 1 – American statesman Henry Clay is the first to receive the honor of lying in state in the United States Capitol rotunda.
- July 5 – Frederick Douglass delivers his famous speech on "The Hypocrisy of American Slavery" in Rochester, New York.
- August 3 – The first Harvard–Yale Regatta boat race between Harvard and Yale Universities, the first North American intercollegiate athletic event, is held on Lake Winnipesaukee.
- September 15 – Loyola College opens its doors to students in the City of Baltimore, Maryland.
- November 2 – 1852 United States presidential election: Democrat Franklin Pierce of New Hampshire defeats Whig Winfield Scott of New Jersey.
- November 5 – American Society of Civil Engineers is founded in New York City as the American Society of Civil Engineers and Architects.
- November 25 – Monticello Convention: 44 people from the northern parts of Oregon Territory meet and draft a petition to establish a separate territorial government north of the Columbia River (which becomes, in the following months, Washington Territory).

=== Undated ===
- In Hawaii sugar planters bring over the first Chinese laborers on 3 or 5 year contracts, giving them 3 dollars per month plus room and board for working a 12-hour day, 6 days a week.
- Lowell, Indiana is incorporated.
- Loyola College in Maryland is chartered as a Jesuit institution in Baltimore.
- Tufts University is chartered in Medford, Massachusetts.
- Mills College is founded as the Young Ladies Seminary in Benicia, California.
- Justin Perkins, an American Presbyterian missionary, produces the first translation of the Bible in Assyrian Neo-Aramaic, which is published with the parallel text of the Syriac Peshitta by the American Bible Society.

=== Ongoing ===
- California Gold Rush (1848–1855)

== Births ==
- January 8 – James Milton Carroll, Baptist pastor, leader, historian and author (died 1931)
- January 11 – Elnora Monroe Babcock, suffragist (died 1934)
- January 14 – Cornelia Cole Fairbanks, wife of Charles W. Fairbanks, Second Lady of the United States (died 1913)
- February 16 – Charles Taze Russell, Christian restorationist minister (died 1916)
- February 18 – Ferdinand Lee Barnett, African American journalist, lawyer and civil rights activist (died 1936)
- February 26 – John Harvey Kellogg, Adventist doctor and health reformer (died 1943)
- March 12 – Mary Catherine Judd, educator, children's author, peace activist (died 1930s)
- March 25 – Charles Loomis Dana, neurologist (died 1935)
- April 1 – Edwin Austin Abbey, painter and illustrator (died 1911)
- April 13 – F. W. Woolworth, merchant and businessman (died 1919)
- April 23 – Edwin Markham, poet (died 1940)
- May 1 – Calamity Jane, frontierswoman (died 1903)
- May 11 – Charles W. Fairbanks, 26th vice president of the United States from 1905 till 1909 and United States Senator from Indiana from 1897 to 1905 (died 1918)
- May 14 – Alton B. Parker, judge and Democratic political candidate (died 1926)
- May 18 – Gertrude Käsebier, née Stanton, one of the most influential American portrait photographers of the early 20th century (died 1934)
- May 23 – Weldon B. Heyburn, U.S. Senator from Idaho from 1903 to 1912 (died 1912)
- June 22 – Mary Canfield Ballard, poet and hymnwriter (died 1927)
- July 4
  - John H. Hill, African American lawyer and educator (died 1936)
  - Loretta C. Van Hook, Presbyterian missionary and educator (died 1935)
- August 16 – Charles Sanger Mellen, railroad manager (died 1927)
- September 15 – Edward Bouchet, African American physicist (died 1918)
- October 25 – Byron Andrews, journalist, statesman, author and businessman (died 1910)
- October 30 – Jane Kelley Adams, educator (died 1924)
- October 31 – Mary Eleanor Wilkins Freeman, short-story and children's fiction writer and poet (died 1930)
- November 1 – Eugene W. Chafin, politician (died 1920)
- November 10 – Henry van Dyke, author, poet, educator and clergyman (died 1933)
- November 15 – Ella Maria Ballou, writer (d. 1937)
- November 16 – Joseph R. Burton, U.S. Senator from Kansas from 1901 to 1906 (died 1923)

== Deaths ==
- February 14 – Thomas Carlin, 7th Governor of Illinois from 1838 to 1842 (born 1789)
- February 24 – John Frazee, first American-born sculptor to execute a bust in marble (born 1790)
- March 9 – Anson Dickinson, painter of miniature portraits (born 1779)
- April 10 – John Howard Payne, actor, playwright, author and consul in Tunis from 1842, lyricist for "Home! Sweet Home!" (born 1791)
- May 6 – William Bellinger Bulloch, U.S. Senator from Georgia in 1813 (born 1777)
- May 15 – Louisa Adams, First Lady of the United States as wife of John Quincy Adams from 1825 to 1829 (born 1775)
- May 18 – Briscoe Baldwin, planter and Virginia politician (born 1789)
- June 8 – Perry Smith, U.S. Senator from Connecticut from 1837 to 1843 (born 1783)
- June 17 – William King, merchant, shipbuilder, army officer and statesman (born 1768)
- June 29 – Henry Clay, U.S. Senator from Kentucky 1806–1807, 1810–1811, 1831–1842 and 1849–1852 (born 1777)
- July 19 – John McKinley, U.S. Senator from Alabama from 1826 to 1831 and in 1837, Associate Justice of the U.S. Supreme Court from 1837 to 1852 (born 1780)
- August 14 – Margaret Taylor, First Lady of the United States as wife of Zachary Taylor (born 1788)
- September 20 – Philander Chase, Episcopal Church bishop, educator, pioneer of the western frontier and founder of Kenyon College (born 1775)
- September 23 – John Vanderlyn, neoclassical painter (born 1775)
- October 4 – James Whitcomb, U.S. Senator from Indiana from 1849 to 1852 (born 1795)
- October 13 – John Lloyd Stephens, traveler, diplomat and Mayanist archaeologist (born 1805)
- October 20 – George Lowrey (Tsa-Tsi-Agi-Li), multiple-term assistant principal chief of the Cherokee (born c. 1770)
- October 24 – Daniel Webster, U.S. Senator from Massachusetts (born 1782)
- October 25 – John C. Clark, politician (born 1793)
- November 18 – John Andrew Shulze, politician (born 1775)
- November 24 – Walter Forward, lawyer and politician, 15th U.S. Secretary of the Treasury from 1841 to 1843 (born 1786)
- November 30 – Junius Brutus Booth, actor, father of John Wilkes Booth and Edwin Booth (born 1796 in England)
- December 13 – Frances Wright, freethinker (born 1795 in Scotland)
- December 18 – Horatio Greenough, sculptor (born 1805)

== See also ==
- Timeline of United States history (1820–1859)
