= 1792 in the United States =

- Decades: 1770s; 1780s; 1790s; 1800s; 1810s
- See also: History of the United States (1789–1849); Timeline of United States history (1790–1819); List of years in the United States

Events from the year 1792 in the United States.

== Incumbents ==
=== Federal government ===
- President: George Washington (Independent-Virginia)
- Vice President: John Adams (F-Massachusetts)
- Chief Justice: John Jay (New York)
- Speaker of the House of Representatives: Jonathan Trumbull, Jr. (Pro-Admin.-Connecticut)
- Congress: 2nd

==== State governments ====
Governors and lieutenant governors

=== Governors ===
- Governor of Connecticut: Samuel Huntington (Federalist)
- Governor of Delaware: Joshua Clayton (Federalist)
- Governor of Georgia: Edward Telfair (Democratic-Republican)
- Governor of Kentucky: Issac Shelby (Democratic-Republican) (starting June 4)
- Governor of Maryland:
  - until February 10: George Plater (no political party)
  - February 10-13: vacant
  - February 13-April 5: James Brice (Federalist)
  - starting April 5: Thomas Sim Lee (Federalist)
- Governor of Massachusetts: John Hancock (Federalist)
- Governor of New Hampshire: Josiah Bartlett (Democratic-Republican)
- Governor of New Jersey: William Paterson (Federalist)
- Governor of New York: George Clinton (Democratic-Republican)
- Governor of North Carolina: Alexander Martin (Anti-Federalist) (until December 14), Richard Dobbs Spaight (Federalist) (starting December 14)
- Governor of Pennsylvania: Thomas Mifflin (no political party)
- Governor of Rhode Island: Arthur Fenner (Country)
- Governor of South Carolina: Charles Pinckney (Federalist) (until December 5), William Moultrie (Federalist) (starting December 5)
- Governor of Vermont: Thomas Chittenden (no political party)
- Governor of Virginia: Henry Lee III (Federalist)

=== Lieutenant governors ===
- Lieutenant Governor of Connecticut: Oliver Wolcott (Federalist)
- Lieutenant Governor of Massachusetts: Samuel Adams (Democratic-Republican)
- Lieutenant Governor of New York: Pierre Van Cortlandt (political party unknown)
- Lieutenant Governor of Rhode Island: Samuel J. Potter (Democratic-Republican)
- Lieutenant Governor of South Carolina: Isaac Holmes (Federalist) (until December 5), James Ladson (Federalist) (starting December 5)
- Lieutenant Governor of Vermont: Peter Olcott (political party unknown)

== Events ==
=== January–March ===
- February 20 – The Postal Service Act, establishing the United States Post Office Department, is signed by President George Washington.
- March 20 – A new capital of North Carolina and county seat of the newly formed Wake County is established after North Carolina State Senator and surveyor William Christmas submits his design for the city. A few months later the capital is officially named Raleigh in honor of Sir Walter Raleigh.

=== April–June ===
- April 2 – The Coinage Act is passed establishing the United States Mint and the United States dollar.
- April 5 – United States President George Washington vetoes a bill designed to apportion representatives among U.S. states. This is the first time the presidential veto is used in the United States.
- May 10 – Union Bank is founded in Boston. In 1925 it merges with State Street Trust Company, now known as the State Street Corporation
- May 11 – Robert Gray's Columbia River expedition: Captain Robert Gray becomes the first explorer to enter the Columbia River.
- May 17 – The Buttonwood Agreement is signed, beginning the New York Stock Exchange.
- June 1 – Kentucky becomes the 15th state of The United States of America (see History of Kentucky).
- June 4 – Isaac Shelby is inaugurated as the first governor of Kentucky.
- June 9 – Denmark recognizes the independence of the United States.

=== October–December ===
- October 12 – The first Columbus Day celebration in the United States is held in New York City, 300 years after his arrival in the New World.
- October 13 – Foundation of Washington, D.C.: The cornerstone of the United States Executive Mansion, known as the White House after 1818, is laid.
- October 29 – Mount Hood (Oregon) is named after British Admiral Lord Hood by Lt. William Broughton of the Vancouver Expedition, who spots the mountain near the mouth of the Willamette River.
- December 3 – 1792 United States presidential election: George Washington is re-elected President of the United States.

=== Undated ===
- George Anschutz constructs the first blast furnace in Pittsburgh, Pennsylvania.
- Shiloh Meeting House, predecessor of Shiloh United Methodist Church in Lynchburg, Virginia, is founded.
- Pearson & Sons bakery, earliest predecessor of Nabisco, opens in Massachusetts.

=== Ongoing ===
- Northwest Indian War (1785–1795)

== Births ==
- February 15 – Floride Calhoun, Second Lady of the U.S. as wife of John C. Calhoun (died 1866)
- March 4
  - Isaac Lea, conchologist, geologist, and publisher (died 1886)
  - Samuel Slocum, inventor (died 1861)
- April 4 – Thaddeus Stevens, politician (died 1868)
- May 10 – Willie Person Mangum, politician (died 1861)
- June 13 – William Austin Burt, inventor ("Father of the typewriter") (died 1858)
- July 10 – George M. Dallas, 11th vice president of the United States from 1845 to 1849 (died 1864)
- September 1 – Chester Harding, portrait painter (died 1866)
- September 7 – David J. Baker, U.S. Senator from Illinois in 1830 (died 1869)
- September 19 – William Backhouse Astor, Sr., business tycoon (died 1875)
- September 22 – John James Appleton, diplomat, born in France (died 1864)
- November 10 – Samuel Nelson, Associate Justice of the Supreme Court of the United States (died 1873)
- November 15 – Isaac Toucey, U.S. Senator from Connecticut from 1851 to 1857 (died 1869)
- November 26 – Sarah Grimké, abolitionist and suffragist (died 1873)
- December 5 – James Guthrie, U.S. Senator from Kentucky from 1865 to 1868 (died 1869)
- Date unknown – Robert H. Adams, U.S. Senator from Mississippi in 1830 (died 1830)

== Deaths ==
- February 15 – John Witherspoon, signatory of the Declaration of Independence (born 1723)
- April 4 – James Sykes, delegate to the Continental Congress (born 1725)
- May 10 – John Stevens, New Jersey delegate to the Continental Congress (born c.1715)
- July 18 – John Paul Jones, sailor and the U.S.'s first well-known naval fighter in the American Revolution (born 1747 in Great Britain)
- October 7 – George Mason, patriot, statesman and delegate (born 1725)
- December 8 – Henry Laurens, 5th president of the Continental Congress, signatory of the Articles of Confederation, father of John Laurens (born 1724)

== See also ==
- Timeline of United States history (1790–1819)
