= 1789 in the United States =

- Decades: 1770s; 1780s; 1790s; 1800s
- See also: History of the United States (1789–1849); Timeline of the American Revolution; List of years in the United States

Events from the year 1789 in the United States. The Articles of Confederation, the agreement under which the nation's government had been operating since 1781, was superseded by the Constitution in March of this year.

== Incumbents ==
=== Federal government ===
- Articles of Confederation (through March 3):
  - 10th Confederation Congress
- United States Constitution (beginning from March 4):
  - President: George Washington (Independent-Virginia) (starting April 30)
  - Vice President: John Adams (no political party-Massachusetts) (starting April 21)
  - Chief Justice: John Jay (New York) (starting October 19)
  - Speaker of the House of Representatives: Frederick Muhlenberg (starting April 1)
  - Congress: 1st United States Congress (starting March 4)

==== State governments ====
Governors and lieutenant governors

=== Governors ===
- Governor of Connecticut: Samuel Huntington (Federalist)
- Governor of Delaware:
  - until March 29: Thomas Collins (no political party)
  - March 29-June 2: Jehu Davis (no political party)
  - starting June 2: Joshua Clayton (Federalist)
- Governor of Georgia: George Handley (no political party) (until January 7), George Walton (Democratic-Republican) (starting January 7)
- Governor of Maryland: John E. Howard (Federalist)
- Governor of Massachusetts: John Hancock (no political party)
- Governor of New Hampshire: John Langdon (Democratic-Republican) (until January 22), John Sullivan (Federalist) (starting January 22)
- Governor of New Jersey: William Livingston (Federalist)
- Governor of New York: George Clinton (Democratic-Republican)
- Governor of North Carolina: Samuel Johnston (Federalist) (November 21-December 17), Alexander Martin (Anti-Federalist) (starting December 17)
- Governor of Pennsylvania: Thomas Mifflin (no political party)
- Governor of South Carolina: Thomas Pinckney (Federalist) (until January 26), Charles Pinckney (Federalist) (starting January 26)
- Governor of Virginia: Beverley Randolph (no political party)

=== Lieutenant governors ===
- Lieutenant Governor of Connecticut: Oliver Wolcott (Federalist)
- Lieutenant Governor of Massachusetts: Benjamin Lincoln (Federalist) (until month and day unknown), Samuel Adams (Democratic-Republican) (starting month and day unknown)
- Lieutenant Governor of New York: Pierre Van Cortlandt (political party unknown)
- Lieutenant Governor of South Carolina: Thomas Gadsden (Federalist) (until January 26), Alexander Gillon (Federalist) (starting January 26)

== Events ==
=== January–March ===
- January 7 – The 1789 United States presidential election and House of Representatives elections are held.
- January 21 – William Hill Brown's anonymous sentimental epistolary novel The Power of Sympathy: or, The Triumph of Nature, usually considered the first American novel, is published in Boston.
- January 23 – Georgetown University is founded in what would become Washington, D.C., becoming the first Catholic college in the United States.
- February 4 – George Washington is unanimously elected the first president of the United States by the United States Electoral College.
- March 4 – At Federal Hall in New York City, the 1st United States Congress meets and declares the new United States Constitution to be in effect.
- March 29 – Thomas Collins, President of Delaware, dies in office.

=== April–June ===
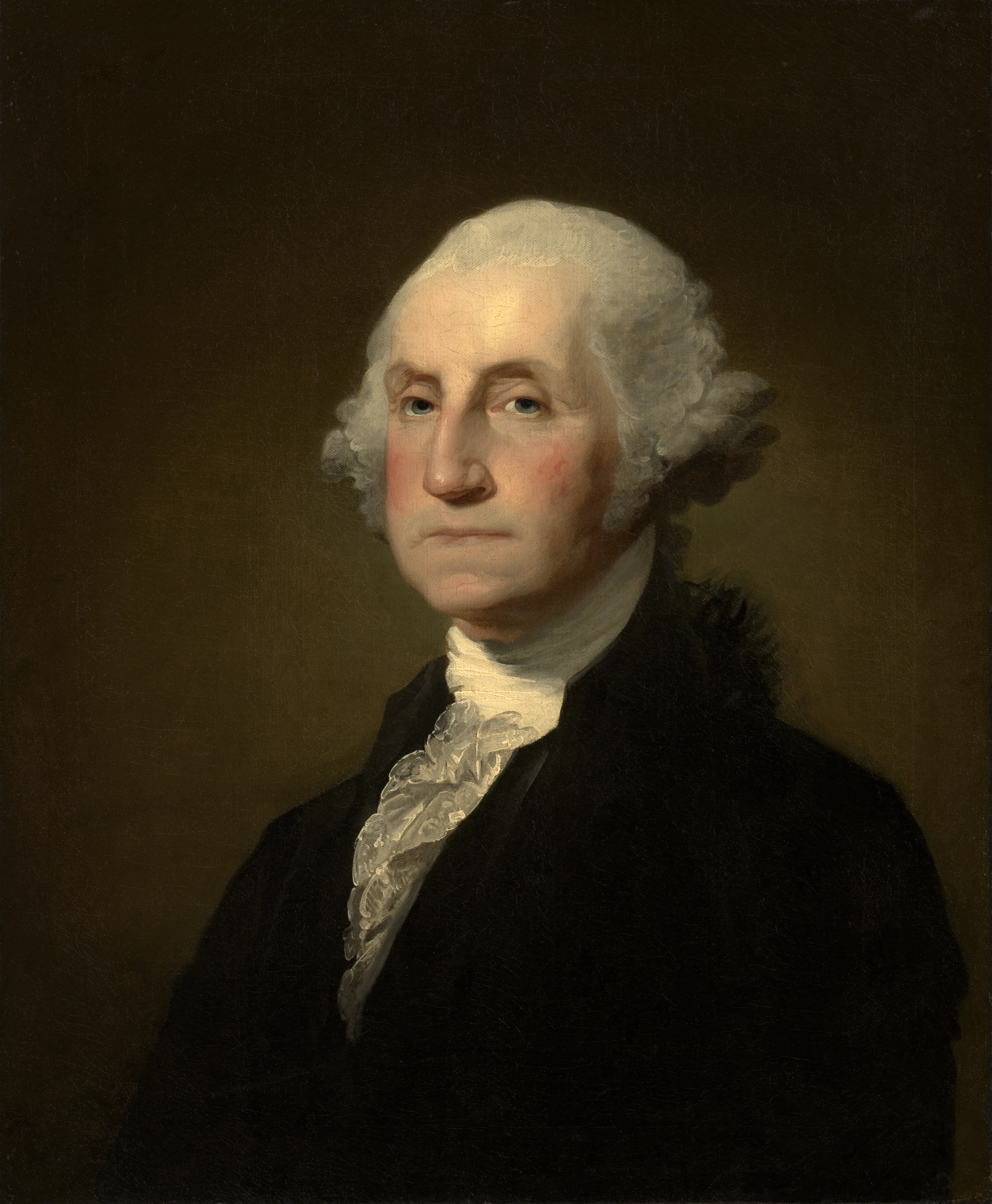
April 30: George Washington becomes the first U.S. president

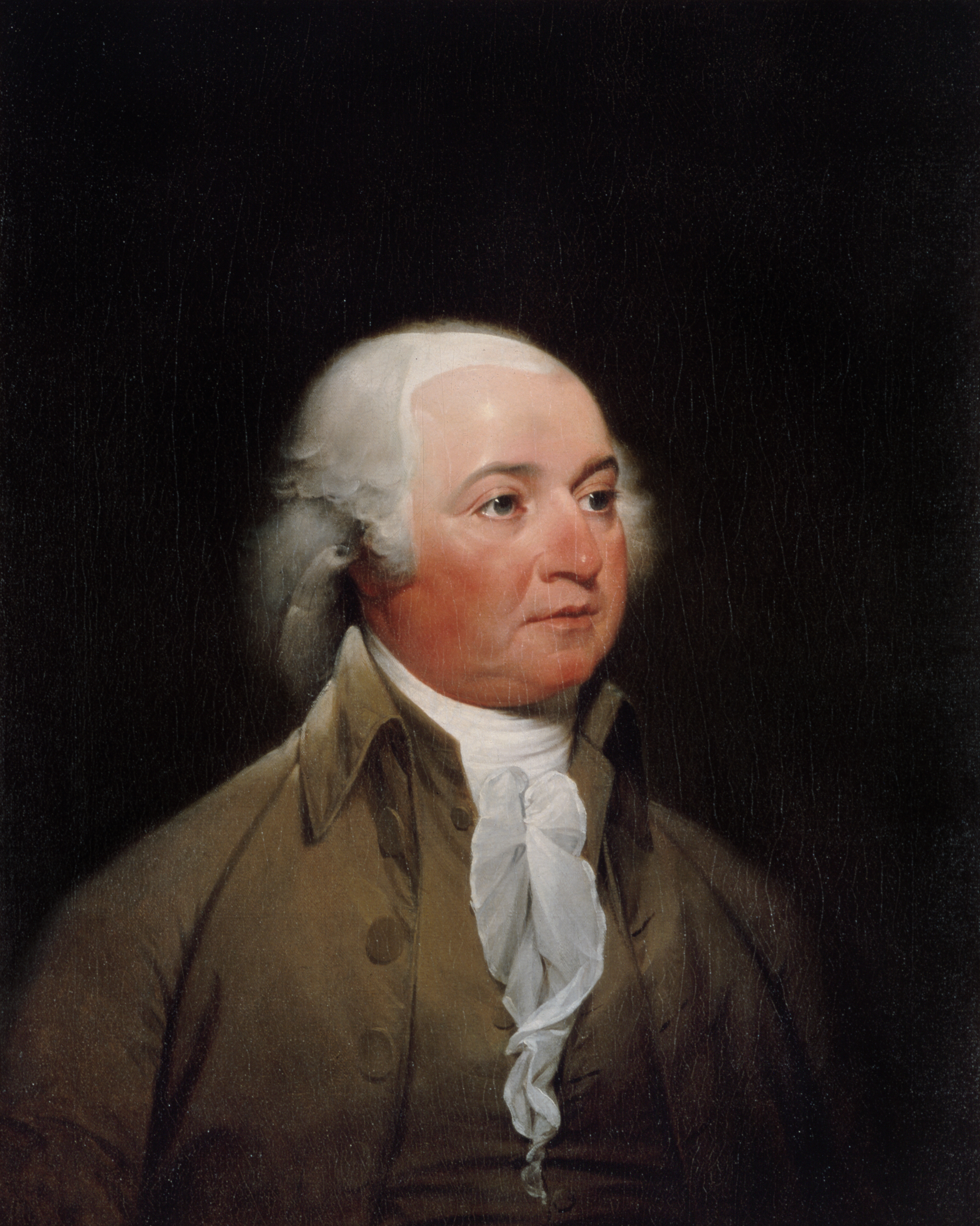
John Adams becomes the first U.S. vice president

- April 1 – At Federal Hall, the United States House of Representatives attains its first quorum and elects Frederick Muhlenberg of Pennsylvania as its first Speaker of the House.
- April 6 – At Federal Hall, the United States Senate attains its first quorum and elects Senator John Langdon as its first president pro tempore; the first joint session of Congress is held on that same date, and the electoral votes of the first presidential election are formally counted. General George Washington is declared President-elect, and John Adams is declared Vice President-elect.
- April 21

- John Adams takes office as Vice-President of the United States and begins to preside the sessions of the United States Senate.
- George Washington's reception at Trenton is hosted by the Ladies of Trenton as he journeys to New York City for his first inauguration.

- April 30 – George Washington is sworn in at Federal Hall in New York City, beginning his term as the first president of the United States.

=== July–September ===
- July – Charles Thomson resigned as secretary of Congress and hands over the Great Seal, bringing an end to the Articles of Confederation.
- July 4 – Congress passes its first tax on 30 different items at 8.5% with discount to American ships over foreign ones.
- July 27 – The first U.S. federal government agency under the new Constitution, the Department of Foreign Affairs (later renamed the Department of State), is established following the month-long Decision of 1789, the first significant construction on the meaning of the U.S. Constitution in Congress.
- August 7 – The United States Department of War is established.
- September 2 – The United States Department of the Treasury is established.
- September 15 – The Department of Foreign Affairs is officially renamed the Department of State.
- September 24 – The Judiciary Act of 1789 establishes the federal judiciary and the United States Marshals Service.
- September 25 – The United States Congress proposes a set of 12 amendments for ratification by the states. Ratification for 10 of these proposals is completed on December 15, 1791, creating the United States Bill of Rights.
- September 29 – The U.S. Department of War establishes the nation's first regular army, with a strength of several hundred men.

=== October–December ===
- November 6 – Pope Pius VI appoints John Carroll the first Roman Catholic bishop in the United States.
- November 20 – New Jersey ratifies the United States Bill of Rights, the first state to do so.
- November 21 – North Carolina ratifies the United States Constitution and becomes the 12th U.S. state (see History of North Carolina).
- November 26 – A national Thanksgiving Day is observed in the United States as recommended by President George Washington and approved by Congress.
- December 11 – The University of North Carolina, the oldest public university in the United States, is founded.

=== Undated ===
- Thomas Jefferson returns from Europe, bringing the first macaroni machine to the United States.
- Influenced by Dr. Benjamin Rush's argument against the excessive use of alcohol, about 200 farmers in a Connecticut community form a temperance association.
- Rev. Elijah Craig begins commercial distillation of Bourbon whiskey in Fayette County, Kentucky (approximate date).
- Fort Washington is built in Cincinnati, to protect early U.S. settlements in the Northwest Territory.

=== Ongoing ===
- Northwest Indian War (1785–1795)

== Births ==
- January 4 – Benjamin Lundy, abolitionist (died 1839)
- January 18 – Briscoe Baldwin, planter and Virginia politician (died 1852)
- February 4 – Thaddeus Betts, U.S. Senator from Connecticut from 1839 to 1840 (died 1840)
- February 18 – Solomon Metcalf Allen, professor (died 1817)
- March 5
  - William S. Archer, U.S. Senator from Virginia from 1841 to 1847 (died 1855)
  - Michael Woolston Ash, U.S. Representative from Pennsylvania from 1835 to 1837 (died 1858)
- July 18 – Thomas Carlin, 7th Governor of Illinois from 1838 to 1842 (died 1852)
- September 9 – William Cranch Bond, astronomer (died 1859)
- September 15 – James Fenimore Cooper, novelist (died 1851)
- September 24 – James Bates, U.S. Representative from Maine from 1831 to 1833 (died 1882)
- October 16 – William Burton, 39th Governor of Delaware from 1859 to 1863 (died 1866)
- October 17 – James Alexander Jr., U.S. Representative from Ohio from 1837 to 1839 (died 1846)
- October 30 – Hiram Bingham I, missionary to Hawaii (died 1869)
- December 17 – Clement Comer Clay, U.S. Senator from Alabama from 1837 to 1841 (died 1866)
- December 21 – John Norvell, U.S. Senator from Michigan from 1837 to 1841 (died 1850)
- December 22 – Levi Woodbury, U.S. Senator from New Hampshire from 1825 to 1831 & 1841 to 1845, 9th Governor of New Hampshire from 1823 to 1824, 13th U.S. Secretary of the Treasury from 1834 to 1841, and Associate Justice of the Supreme Court of the U.S. from 1845 (died 1851)
- December 28 – Catharine Sedgwick, domestic novelist (died 1867)

== Deaths ==
- January 4 – Thomas Nelson Jr., signatory of the Declaration of Independence and Governor of Virginia in 1781 (born 1738)
- January 10 – James Mitchell Varnum, brigadier general of the Revolutionary War, Continental Congressman for Rhode Island (born 1748)
- January 13 – Joseph Spencer, major general of the Revolutionary War, Continental Congressman for Connecticut (born 1714)
- January 25 – James Randolph Reid, Continental Congressman for Connecticut (born 1750)
- February 12 – Ethan Allen, Revolutionary War patriot (born 1738)
- February 19 – Nicholas Van Dyke, lawyer and President of Delaware (born 1738)
- March 29 – Thomas Collins, planter and President of Delaware (born 1732)
- April 13 – Joseph Spencer, colonel of the Revolutionary War, Continental Congressman for New Hampshire (born 1739)
- July 21 – Joseph Spencer, Continental Congressman for Maryland (c. 1750)
- September 4 – Paul Spooner, lieutenant governor of Vermont from 1782 to 1787 (born 1746)
- September 23
  - Silas Deane, American Continental Congressman for Connecticut (born 1737)
  - John Rogers, American Continental Congressman for Maryland (born 1723)
- October 27 – John Cook, farmer, President of Delaware (born 1730)
- November 10 – Richard Caswell, major general of the Revolutionary War, Continental Congressman and Governor of North Carolina from 1776 to 1780 & 1785 to 1787) (born 1729)
- November 17 – Samuel Holden Parsons, major general of the Revolutionary War, member of the Connecticut House of Representatives (born 1737)
- December 10 – William Pierce, member of the Georgia House of Representatives, Continental Congressman for Georgia (born 1753)

== See also ==
- Timeline of the American Revolution (1760–1789)
