= 1787 in the United States =

- Decades: 1770s; 1780s; 1790s; 1800s
- See also: History of the United States (1776–1789); Timeline of the American Revolution; List of years in the United States

Events from the year 1787 in the United States. The United States Constitution was written and the ratification process began.

== Incumbents ==
=== Confederal government ===
- President: Arthur St. Clair (February 2-October 29)
- Second Continental Congress

=== Governors ===
- Governor of Delaware: Thomas Collins (no political party) (starting December 7)
- Governor of New Jersey: William Livingston (Federalist) (starting December 18)
- Governor of Pennsylvania: Benjamin Franklin (Independent) (starting December 12)

== Events ==
=== January–March ===
- January 6 – The North Carolina General Assembly authorizes nine commissioners to purchase 100 acres (0.40 km^{2}) of land for the county seat of Chatham County. The town is named Pittsborough (later shortened to Pittsboro) for William Pitt the Younger.
- February 28 – A charter is granted establishing the institution known today as the University of Pittsburgh.

=== April–June ===
- April 2 – John Hancock wins the 1787 Massachusetts gubernatorial election, defeating incumbent governor James Bowdoin.
- May 14 – In Philadelphia, Pennsylvania, delegates begin arriving to write a new Constitution for the United States.
- May 25 – In Philadelphia, Pennsylvania, delegates begin to convene a Constitutional Convention intended to amend the Articles of Confederation. However, a new Constitution for the United States is eventually produced. George Washington presides over the Convention.
- June 6 – Franklin College, named for Benjamin Franklin, opens in Lancaster, Pennsylvania. It later merges with Marshall College to become Franklin and Marshall College.
- June 20 – Oliver Ellsworth moves at the Federal Convention that the government be called the United States.

=== July–September ===
- July 13 – The U.S. Congress enacts the Northwest Ordinance establishing governing rules for the Northwest Territory. It also establishes procedures for the admission of new states including gridded townships and limits the expansion of slavery.
- August 27 – Launching a 45-foot (14 m) steam powered craft on the Delaware River, John Fitch demonstrates the first U.S. patent for his design.
- September 17 – The United States Constitution is adopted by the Constitutional Convention in Philadelphia.

=== October–December ===
- October 27 – The first of The Federalist papers, a series of essays, written by Alexander Hamilton, James Madison and John Jay calling for ratification of the U.S. Constitution, is published in a New York paper.
- December 7 – Delaware ratifies the Constitution and becomes the first U.S. state (see History of Delaware).
- December 8 – Mission La Purisima Concepcion is founded by Father Fermín Francisco de Lasuén, becoming the 11th mission in the California mission chain.
- December 12 – Pennsylvania becomes the second U.S. state (see History of Pennsylvania).
- December 18 – New Jersey becomes the third U.S. state (see History of New Jersey).

=== Undated ===
- The North Carolina General Assembly incorporates Waynesborough and designates it the county seat for Wayne County, North Carolina.

=== Ongoing ===
- Articles of Confederation in effect (1781–1788)
- Northwest Indian War (1785–1795)

== Births ==
- January 10 – Robert C. Nicholas, U.S. Senator from Louisiana from 1836 to 1841 (died 1857)
- February 13 – James P. Carrell, minister, singing teacher, composer and songbook compiler (died 1854)
- February 23 – Emma Willard, women's rights activist and educator (died 1870)
- March 7 – George Bethune English, explorer and writer (died 1828)
- March 28 – Theodore Frelinghuysen, running mate of Henry Clay in 1844 (born 1862)
- May 7 – Thomas Buck Reed, U.S. Senator from Mississippi from 1826 to 1827 and in 1829 (died 1829)
- June 27 – Thomas Say, naturalist (died 1834)
- July 31? – Oliver H. Prince, U.S. Senator from Georgia from 1828 to 1829 (died 1837)
- August 20 – John Milton Niles, U.S. Senator from Connecticut from 1835 to 1839 and from 1843 to 1849 (died 1856)
- September 10 – John J. Crittenden, U.S. Senator from Kentucky 1817-1819, 1835-1841, 1842-1848 & 1855-1861 (died 1863)
- October 18 – Robert L. Stevens, inventor and president of the Camden and Amboy Railroad (died 1856)
- November 15 – Richard Henry Dana Sr., poet, critic and lawyer (died 1879)
- December 10 – Thomas Hopkins Gallaudet, minister, educator, co-founder of the first permanent school for the deaf in North America (died 1851)

== Deaths ==
- January 1 – Arthur Middleton, politician (born 1742)
- April 3 – George William Fairfax, planter and member of the landed gentry of late colonial Virginia (born 1729)
- August 27 – Charles DeWitt, planter and member of the landed gentry of late colonial Virginia (born 1727)
- October 5 – Thomas Stone, planter and lawyer, signatory of U.S. Declaration of Independence (born 1743)
- William Savery, cabinetmaker (born 1721 or 1722)

== See also ==
- Timeline of the American Revolution (1760–1789)
