= 1791 in the United States =

- Decades: 1770s; 1780s; 1790s; 1800s; 1810s
- See also: History of the United States (1789–1849); Timeline of United States history (1790–1819); List of years in the United States

Events from the year 1791 in the United States.

== Incumbents ==
=== Federal government ===
- President: George Washington (Independent-Virginia)
- Vice President: John Adams (F-Massachusetts)
- Chief Justice: John Jay (New York)
- Speaker of the House of Representatives:

Frederick Muhlenberg (Pro-Admin.-Pennsylvania) (until March 4)
Jonathan Trumbull, Jr. (Pro-Admin.-Connecticut) (starting October 24)

- Congress: 1st (until March 4), 2nd (starting March 4)

==== State governments ====
Governors and lieutenant governors

=== Governors ===
- Governor of Connecticut: Samuel Huntington (Federalist)
- Governor of Delaware: Joshua Clayton (Federalist)
- Governor of Georgia: Edward Telfair (Democratic-Republican)
- Governor of Maryland: John E. Howard (Federalist) (until November 14), George Plater (no political party) (starting November 14)
- Governor of Massachusetts: John Hancock (no political party)
- Governor of New Hampshire: Josiah Bartlett (Democratic-Republican)
- Governor of New Jersey: William Paterson (Federalist)
- Governor of New York: George Clinton (Democratic-Republican)
- Governor of North Carolina: Alexander Martin (Anti-Federalist)
- Governor of Pennsylvania: Thomas Mifflin (no political party)
- Governor of Rhode Island: Arthur Fenner (Country)
- Governor of South Carolina: Charles Pinckney (Federalist)
- Governor of Vermont: Thomas Chittenden (no political party) (starting March 4)
- Governor of Virginia: Beverley Randolph (no political party) (until December 1), Henry Lee III (Federalist) (starting December 1)

=== Lieutenant governors ===
- Lieutenant Governor of Connecticut: Oliver Wolcott (Federalist)
- Lieutenant Governor of Massachusetts: Samuel Adams (Democratic-Republican)
- Lieutenant Governor of New York: Pierre Van Cortlandt (political party unknown)
- Lieutenant Governor of Rhode Island: Samuel J. Potter (Democratic-Republican)
- Lieutenant Governor of South Carolina: Alexander Gillon (Federalist) (until February 15), Isaac Holmes (Federalist) (starting February 15)
- Lieutenant Governor of Vermont: Peter Olcott (political party unknown) (starting March 4)

== Events ==
December 15: The Bill of Rights comes into effect

- February 24 – First Bank of the United States chartered for 20 years, with headquarters in Philadelphia.
- March 4 – Vermont is admitted as the 14th U.S. state (see History of Vermont).
- March 5 – Thomas Chittenden is inaugurated as the first governor of Vermont.
- March 9 – Pierre Charles L'Enfant arrives in Georgetown and begins designing the federal capital city.
- March 30 – District of Columbia is established.
- April 29–May 8 – The first American ships reach Japan, brigantine Lady Washington captained by John Kendrick of Boston, and the brig Grace.
- August 26 – John Fitch is granted a patent for the steamboat in the United States.
- September 5 – An ordinance is written barring the game of baseball within 80 yards of the Meeting House in Pittsfield, Massachusetts, the first known reference to the game of baseball in North America.
- September 9 – Washington, D.C. is officially named after the incumbent President.
- September 25 – Mission Santa Cruz is founded by Basque Franciscan Father Fermín Lasuén, becoming the 12th mission in the California mission chain.
- October 9 – Mission Nuestra Señora de la Soledad is founded by Father Fermin Lasuen, becoming the 13th mission in the California mission chain.
- October 25 – The State of the Union address.
- December 15 – Ratification by the states of the first ten amendments to the United States Constitution is completed, creating the United States Bill of Rights. Two additional amendments remain pending, and one of these is finally ratified in 1992, becoming the Twenty-seventh Amendment.

=== Ongoing ===
- Northwest Indian War (1785–1795)

== Births ==
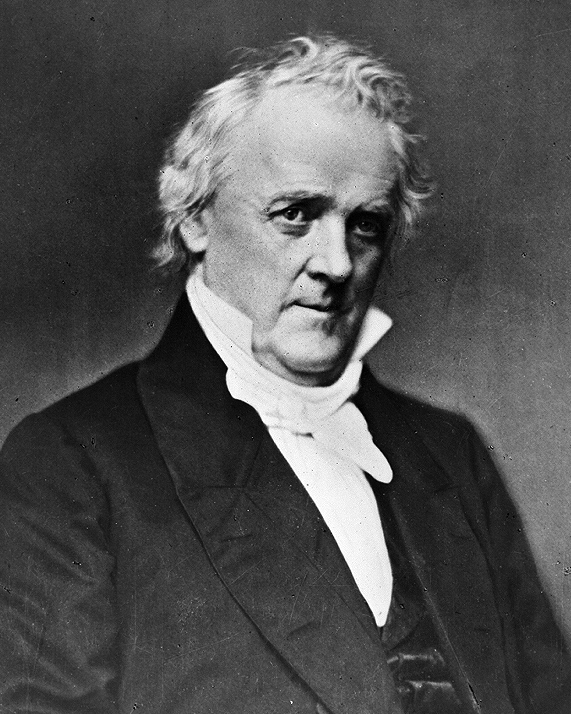
James Buchanan

- February 4 – John McClean, United States Senator from Illinois from 1824 till 1825 and from 1829 till 1830. (died 1830)
- February 12 – Peter Cooper, industrialist, inventor, philanthropist, and candidate for President of the United States (died 1883)
- April 23 – James Buchanan, 15th president of the United States from 1857 till 1861. (died 1868)
- April 27 – Samuel Morse, American painter and inventor (died 1872)
- June 1 – John Nelson (lawyer), United States lawyer (died 1860)
- July 18 – Isaac D. Barnard, United States Senator from 1827 till 1831. (died 1834)
- October 24 – Joseph R. Underwood, United States Senator from Kentucky from 1847 till 1853. (died 1876)
- November 27 – Truman Smith, United States Senator from Connecticut from 1849 till 1854. (died 1884)

== Deaths ==
- April 24 – Benjamin Harrison V, signer of Declaration of Independence, father of President William Henry Harrison, great-grandfather of President Benjamin Harrison (born 1726)
- May 9 – Francis Hopkinson, signer of Declaration of Independence (born 1737)
- John Roth Prussian clergyman (born 1726 in Prussia)

== See also ==
- Timeline of United States history (1790–1819)
