= 1790 in the United States =

- Decades: 1770s; 1780s; 1790s; 1800s; 1810s
- See also: History of the United States (1789–1849); Timeline of the American Revolution; List of years in the United States

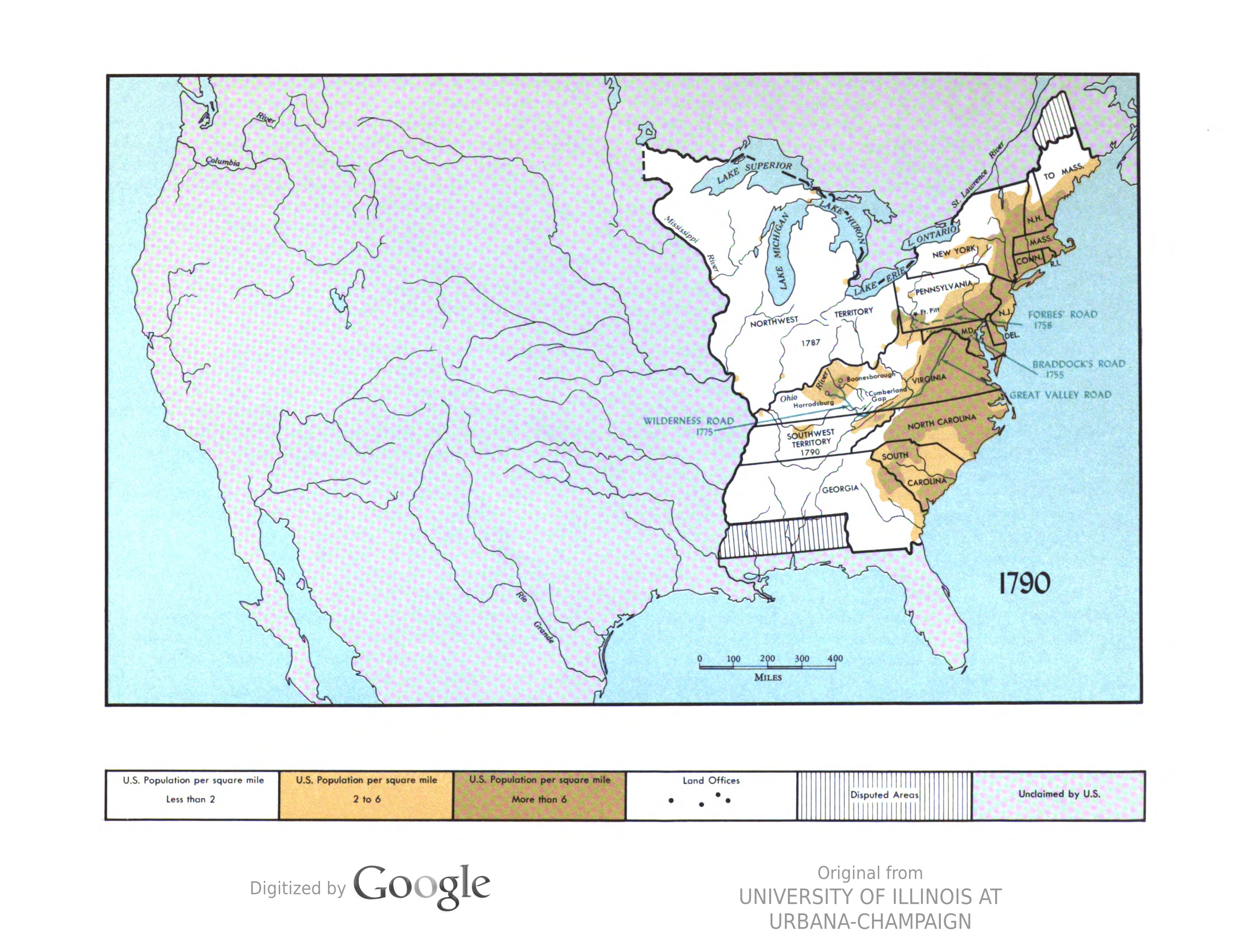
1790 in the United States showing Forbes' Road, Braddock's Road, the Great Valley Road, and the Wilderness Road

Events from the year 1790 in the United States.

== Incumbents ==
=== Federal government ===
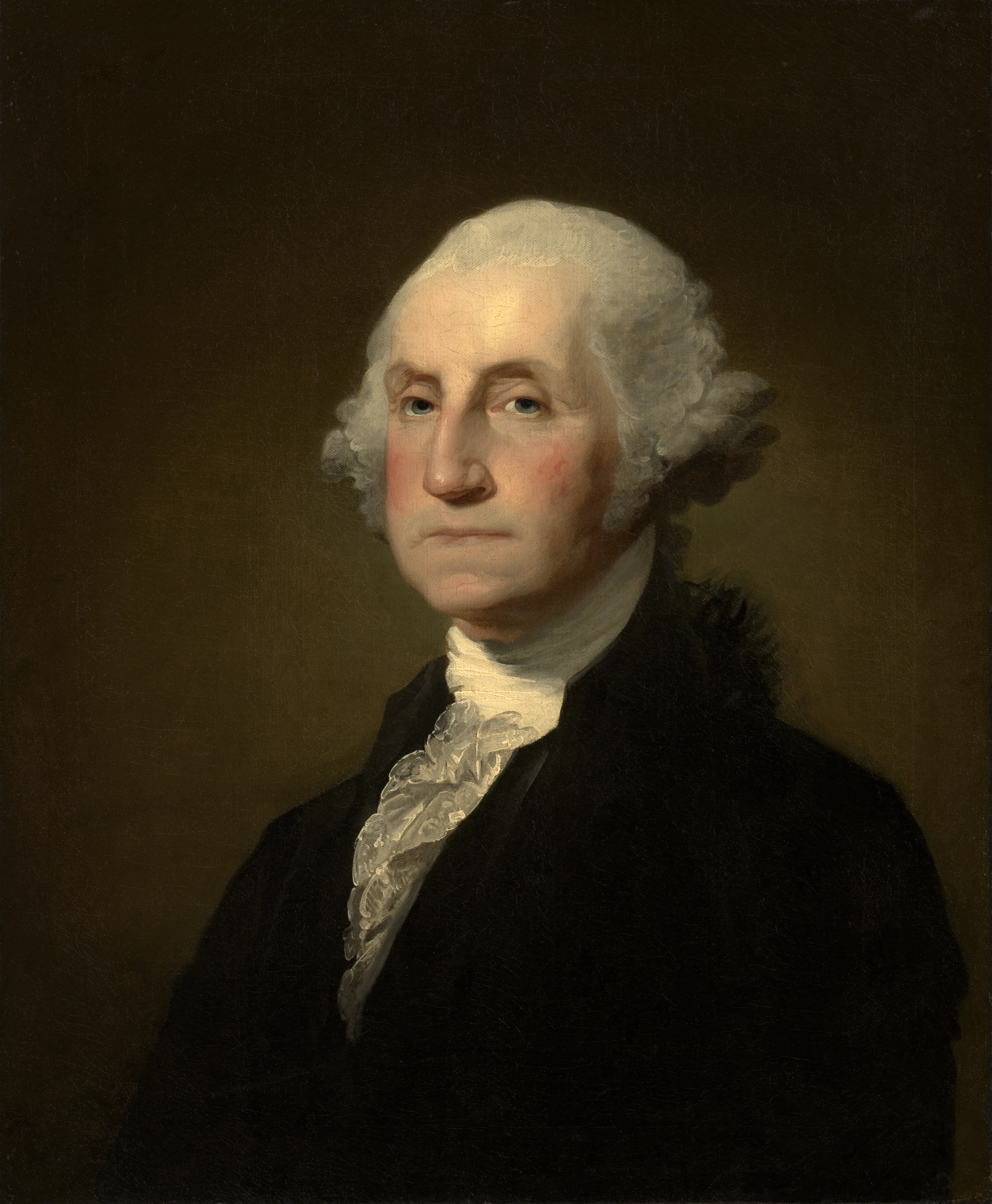
George Washington

- President: George Washington (Independent-Virginia)
- Vice President: John Adams (F-Massachusetts)
- Chief Justice: John Jay (New York)
- Speaker of the House of Representatives: Frederick Muhlenberg (Pro-Admin.-Pennsylvania)
- Congress: 1st

==== State governments ====
Governors and lieutenant governors

=== Governors ===
- Governor of Connecticut: Samuel Huntington (Federalist)
- Governor of Delaware: Joshua Clayton (Federalist)
- Governor of Georgia: George Walton (Democratic-Republican) (until November 9), Edward Telfair (Democratic-Republican) (starting November 9)
- Governor of Maryland: John E. Howard (Federalist)
- Governor of Massachusetts: John Hancock (no political party)
- Governor of New Hampshire: John Sullivan (Federalist) (until June 5), Josiah Bartlett (Democratic-Republican) (starting June 5)
- Governor of New Jersey:
  - until July 25: William Livingston (no political party)
  - July 25 – October 29: Elisha Lawrence (Federalist)
  - starting October 29: William Paterson (Federalist)
- Governor of New York: George Clinton (Democratic-Republican)
- Governor of North Carolina: Alexander Martin (Anti-Federalist)
- Governor of Pennsylvania: Thomas Mifflin (no political party)
- Governor of Rhode Island: Arthur Fenner (Country) (starting May 29)
- Governor of South Carolina: Charles Pinckney (Federalist)
- Governor of Virginia: Beverley Randolph (no political party)

=== Lieutenant governors ===
- Lieutenant Governor of Connecticut: Oliver Wolcott (Federalist)
- Lieutenant Governor of Massachusetts: Samuel Adams (Democratic-Republican)
- Lieutenant Governor of New York: Pierre Van Cortlandt (political party unknown)
- Lieutenant Governor of Rhode Island: Samuel J. Potter (Democratic-Republican) (starting May 29)
- Lieutenant Governor of South Carolina: Alexander Gillon (Federalist)

== Events ==
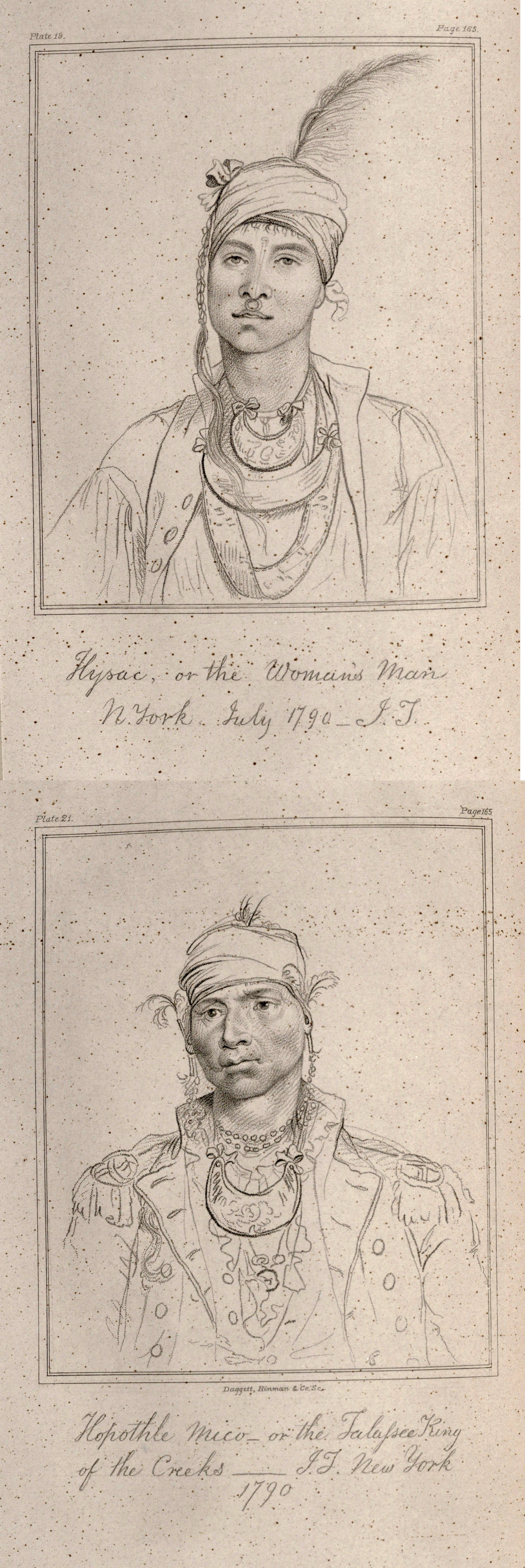
Sketches of Creek leaders, Hysac, or the Woman's Man, and Hopothle Mico, or the Talassee King of the Creeks, made by John Trumbull in 1790 during negotiations for the Treaty of New York. Miko was a Muskogean language family title equivalent to chief. (Yale Beinecke J18 T771 841)

=== January–March ===
- January 8 – President of the U.S. George Washington gives the first State of the Union address, in New York City.
- February 1 – In New York City the Supreme Court of the United States convenes for the first time.
- February 11 – Two Quaker delegates petition the United States Congress for the abolition of slavery.
- March 1 – The first United States census is authorized.
- March 21 – Thomas Jefferson reports to President George Washington in New York City as the new United States Secretary of State.

=== April–June ===
- April 10 – The United States patent system is established.
- May 26 – Southwest Ordinance creates a Southwest Territory.
- May 29 – Rhode Island ratifies the United States Constitution and becomes the last of the 13 original states to do so (see History of Rhode Island).
- June 20 – Compromise of 1790: Thomas Jefferson, James Madison, and Alexander Hamilton come to an agreement: Madison agrees to not be "strenuous" in opposition for the assumption of state debts by the federal government; Hamilton agrees to support the capital site being above the Potomac.

=== July–September ===
- July 10 – The House of Representatives votes on where to locate the national capital.
- July 16 – The signing of the Residence Act establishes a site along the Potomac River as the District of Columbia, the capital district of the United States.
- July 31 – Inventor Samuel Hopkins becomes the first to be issued a U.S. patent (for an improved method of making potash).
- August 2 – The first United States Census is taken.
- August 4 – A newly passed U.S. tariff act creates the United States Revenue Cutter Service, the forerunner of the Coast Guard.

=== Undated ===
- The first United States federal budget bill is introduced by Alexander Hamilton.
- 5.1% of Americans are living in centers of 2,500 or more people.

=== Ongoing ===
- Northwest Indian War (1785–1795)

== Births ==
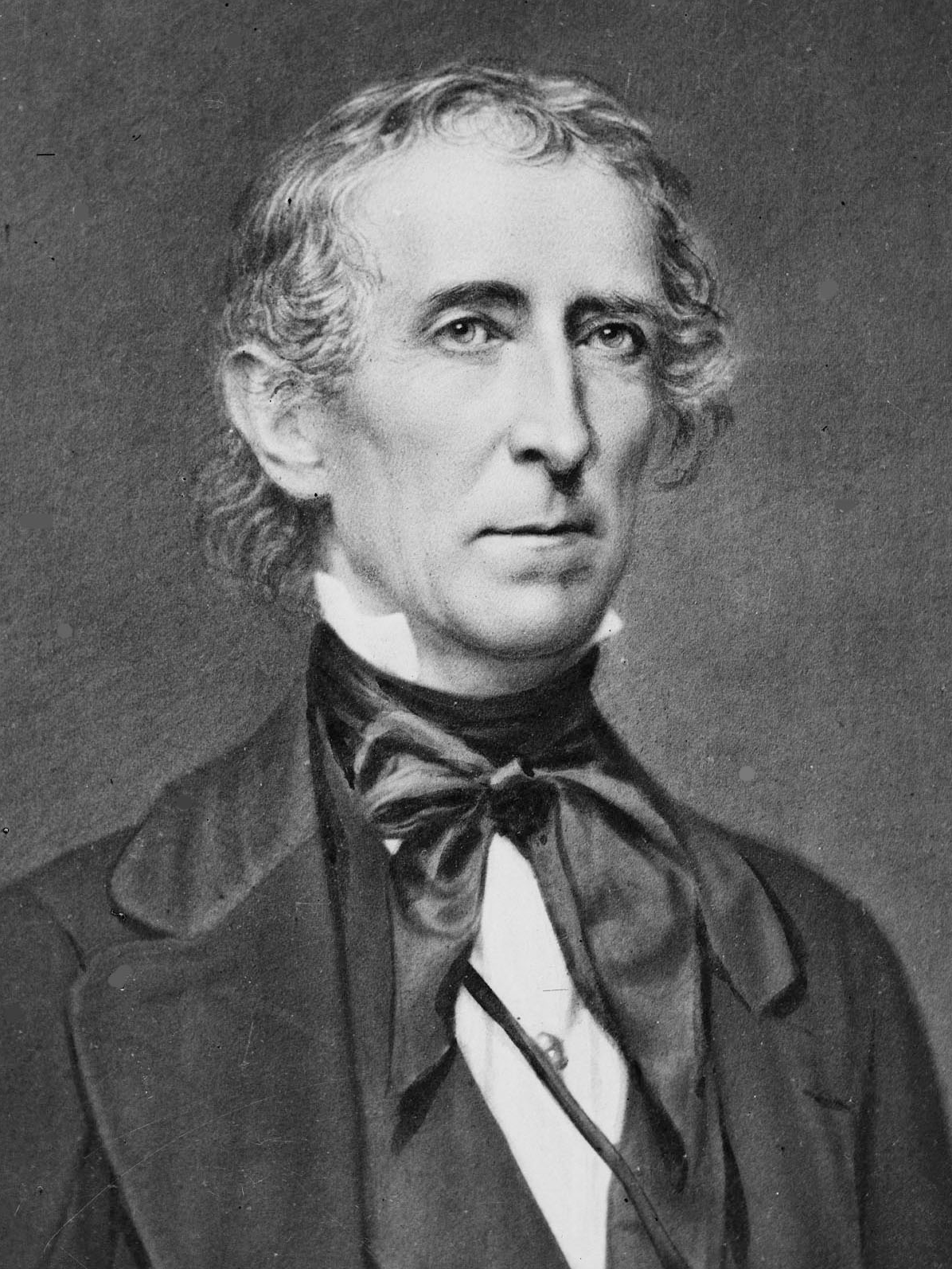
John Tyler

- January 6 – Arnold Naudain, U.S. Senator from Delaware from 1830 to 1836 (died 1872)
- January 13 – Richard Saltonstall Rogers, shipping merchant and politician (died 1873)
- January 17 – Powhatan Ellis, U.S. Senator from Mississippi from 1825 to 1826 and from 1827 to 1832 (died 1863)
- February 6 – John Silva Meehan, publisher and newspaper editor (died 1863)
- March 29 – John Tyler, tenth president of the United States from 1841 to 1845, tenth vice president of the United States from March to April 1841 (died 1862)
- May 20 – Micajah Thomas Hawkins, politician (died 1858)
- June 1 – Chester Ashley, U.S. Senator from Arkansas from 1844 to 1848 (died 1848)
- July 8 – Fitz-Greene Halleck, poet (died 1867)
- July 18 – John Frazee, portrait sculptor (died 1852)
- October 1 – Henry H. Chambers, U.S. Senator from Alabama from 1825 to 1826 (died 1826)
- November 12 – Letitia Christian Tyler, First Lady of the United States (died 1842)
- Unknown
  - Willis Buell, politician and portrait painter (died 1851)
  - James Moore Wayne, politician and Associate Justice of the Supreme Court of the United States (died 1867)
- Probable – Lone Horn, Miniconjou chief (died 1875)

== Deaths ==
- January 25 – Meriwether Smith, Continental Congressman for Virginia (born 1730)
- January 31 – Thomas Lewis, Virginia settler (born 1718 in Ireland)
- February 20 – Leonard Lispenard, merchant, politician and landowner (born 1714)
- March 4 – Henry Wisner, Continental Congressman for New York (born 1720)
- March 12 – William Grayson, Continental Congressman and U.S. Senator for Virginia (born 1740)
- April 2 – Robert H. Harrison, American jurist and lieutenant colonel of the Continental Army (born 1745)
- April 17 – Benjamin Franklin, publisher, inventor, congressman, ambassador, abolitionist and American icon (born 1706)
- May 4 – Matthew Tilghman, Continental Congressman for Maryland (born 1718)
- May 9 – William Clingan, Continental Congressman for Pennsylvania (born c. 1721)
- May 20 – Nathan Miller, Continental Congressman for Rhode Island (born 1743)
- May 26 – Nathaniel Folsom, Continental Congressman for New Hampshire and Revolutionary War major general (born 1726)
- May 29 – Israel Putnam, Revolutionary War general (born 1718)
- June 1 – Theodorick Bland, Continental Congressman and U.S. Representative for Virginia (born 1741)
- July 25 – William Livingston, signer of the U.S. Constitution and Governor of New Jersey from 1776 to 1790 (born 1723)
- August 16 – David Brearley, Revolutionary War colonel, signer of the U.S. Constitution for New Jersey and federal judge (born 1745)
- October 14 – William Hooper, signer of the Declaration of Independence (born 1742)
- October 19 – Lyman Hall, signer of the Declaration of Independence and Governor of Georgia from 1783 to 1784 (born 1724)
- October 31 – Michael Schlatter, Swiss-born clergyman (born 1716)
- November 6 – James Bowdoin, Governor of Massachusetts (born 1726)
- November 16 – Daniel of St. Thomas Jenifer, Continental Congressman and signer of the U.S. Constitution for Maryland (born 1723)
- November 27 – Robert Livingston, member of the New York colonial assembly from 1737 to 1758 (born 1708)
- December 16 – Benjamin Andrew, Continental Congressman for Georgia and member of the Georgia House of Representatives (born 1713)
- Unknown – John Hawks, architect (born c. 1731 in England)

== See also ==
- Timeline of United States history (1790–1819)
