= Henry G. Blasdel =

American politician

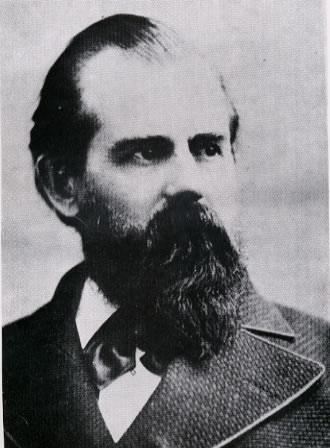

1st Governor of Nevada
- In office December 5, 1864 – January 2, 1871
- Lieutenant: John S. Crosman; James S. Slingerland
- Preceded by: James W. Nye as Territorial Governor
- Succeeded by: Lewis R. Bradley

Personal details
- Born: Henry Goode Blasdel; January 20, 1825 Lawrenceburg, Indiana, U.S.
- Died: July 26, 1900 (aged 75) Oakland, California, U.S.
- Resting place: Mountain View Cemetery (Oakland, California)
- Party: Republican
- Spouse: Sarah Jane Cox Blasdel

Henry Goode Blasdel (January 20, 1825 – July 26, 1900) was an American politician and a member of the Republican Party. He was the first governor of Nevada, serving during the American Civil War and the first years of the Reconstruction era.

He was born on January 20, 1825, in the pioneer settlement of Cambridge near Lawrenceburg, Indiana. He had a limited education in the common schools of his native state. He married Sarah Jane Cox and they had three children.

== Career ==
Blasdel worked as a farmer, storekeeper and river boat captain before he came to Nevada in 1861, when he was appointed Recorder of Storey County. He served on the National Union League Committee which notified President Abraham Lincoln of his renomination. He was active in mining and milling.

Securing the Republican gubernatorial nomination, Blasdel was elected Governor in 1864, and re-elected in 1866. During his tenure, the state government was organized, additional land was ceded to the state, plans were made for the first state capitol building, and an Indian uprising was dealt with.

After his governorship, Blasdel retired from political life and in 1891 he moved his family to Oakland, California, where he continued to be active in mining and milling.

== Death ==
Blasdel died in his home in Oakland, California on July 26, 1900. He is interred at Mountain View Cemetery (Oakland, California).

Party political offices
First	Republican nominee for Governor of Nevada; 1864, 1866	Succeeded by F.A. Tritle
Political offices
Preceded by James W. Nye; Territorial Governor	Governors of Nevada; 1864–1870	Succeeded by Lewis R. Bradley
