= James S. Slingerland =

Nevada politician

James S. Slingerland (1834 - 1874) was an American politician in Nevada. He served as Lieutenant Governor of Nevada from 1866-1870. In 1867 and 1869, he served as president of the Nevada Senate.

He was born in Ann Arbor, Michigan. He married and had two children. He served in the Nevada Assembly. He was a Republican.

He is buried at Lone Mountain Cemetery, Carson City, Nevada.
