= History of the United States (1815–1849) =

The United States of America
- 1815–1849
History of the United States (1789–1815)	History of the United States (1849–1865)
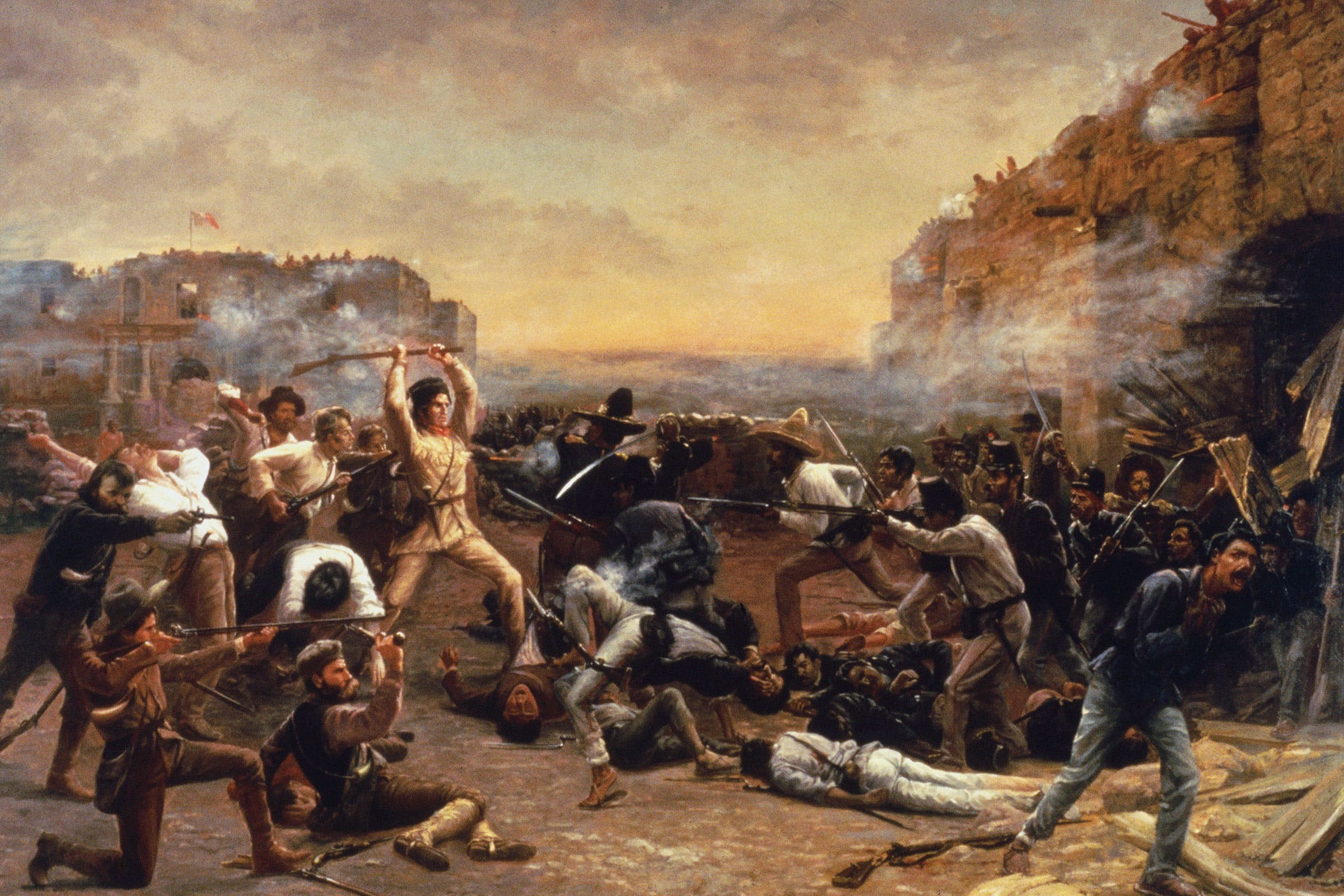
- Battle of the Alamo, Davy Crocketts last stand
- Location: United States
- Including: Era of Good Feelings; Jacksonian Era; Industrial Revolution; Migrations: American frontier; Mormon pioneers; Westward Expansion Trails
- President(s): James Madison; James Monroe; John Quincy Adams; Andrew Jackson; Martin Van Buren; William Henry Harrison; John Tyler; James K. Polk
- Key events: Trail of Tears; Nullification Crisis; Second Great Awakening; Manifest Destiny; Westward Expansion; Mexican–American War; Seneca Falls Convention; Jacksonian Democracy; American Industrial Revolution; Prelude to the Civil War

The history of the United States from 1815 to 1849—also called the Middle Period, the Antebellum Era, or the Age of Jackson—involved westward expansion across the American continent, the proliferation of suffrage to nearly all white men, and the rise of the Second Party System of politics between Democrats and Whigs. Whigs—representing merchants, financiers, professionals, and a growing middle class—wanted to modernize society, using tariffs and federally funded internal improvements; Jacksonian Democrats opposed them and closed down the national bank in the 1830s. The Jacksonians favored expansion across the continent, known as manifest destiny, dispossessing Native Americans of lands to be occupied by farmers, planters, and slaveholders. As a result of the annexation of Texas, the defeat of Mexico in war, and a compromise with Britain, the western third of the nation rounded out the continental United States by 1848.

The transformation America underwent was not so much political democratization but rather the explosive growth of technologies and networks of infrastructure and communication, including with the telegraph, railroads, the post office, and an expanding print industry. These developments made possible the religious revivals of the Second Great Awakening, the expansion of education, and social reform. They modernized party politics and sped up business by enabling the fast, efficient movement of goods, money, and people across an expanding nation. They transformed a loose-knit collection of parochial agricultural communities into a powerful cosmopolitan nation. Economic modernization proceeded rapidly, thanks to highly profitable cotton crops in the South, new textile and machine-making industries in the Northeast, and a fast developing transportation infrastructure.

Breaking loose from European models, the Americans developed their own high culture, notably in literature and in higher education. The Second Great Awakening brought revivals across the country, forming new denominations and greatly increasing church membership, especially among Methodists and Baptists. By the 1840s, increasing numbers of immigrants were arriving from Europe, especially British, Irish, and Germans. Many settled in the cities, which were starting to emerge as a major factor in the economy and society. The Whigs had warned that annexation of Texas would lead to a crisis over slavery, and they were proven right by the turmoil of the 1850s that led to the Civil War.

== Names ==
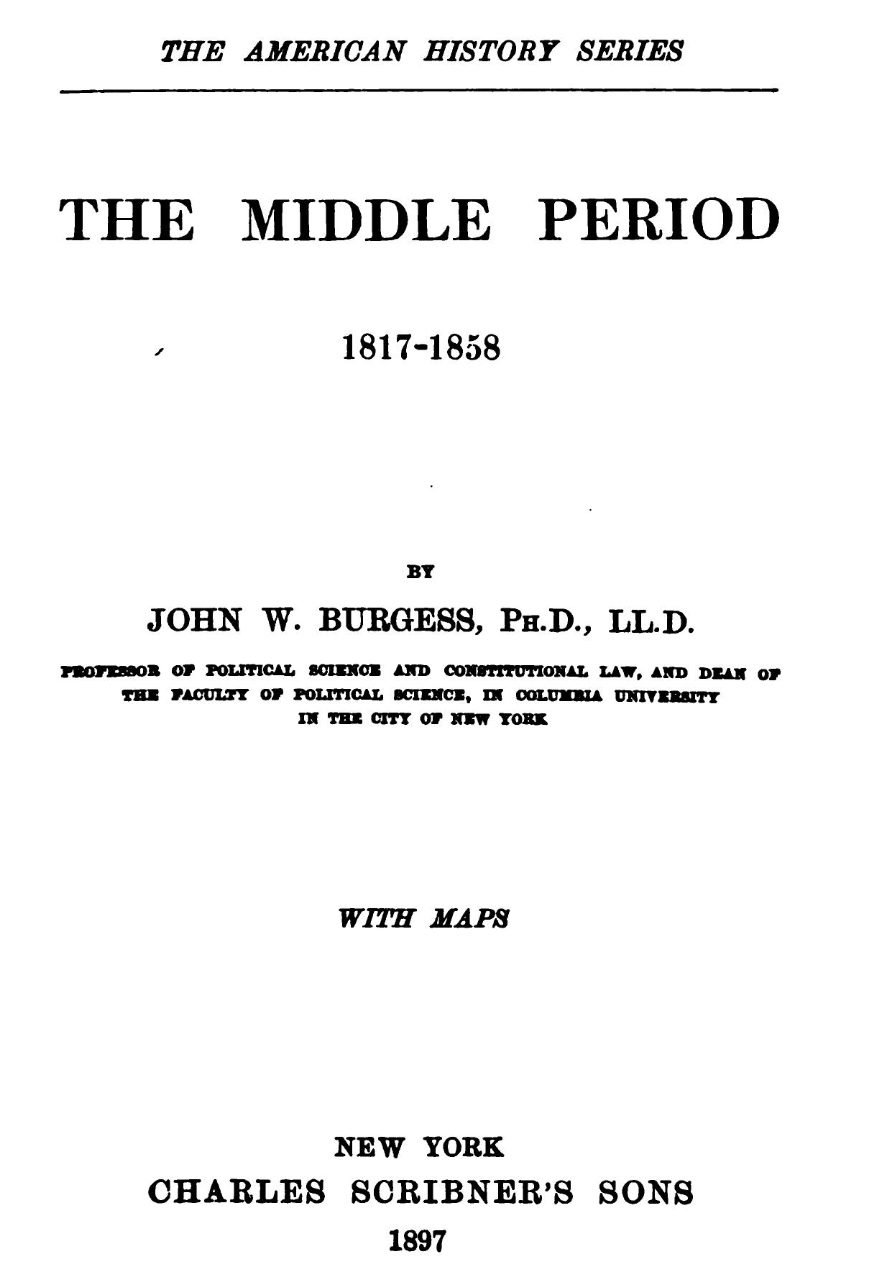
This approximate era has been called the Middle Period

Historians of the United States have referred to this approximate period in American history using various names. It has been called the Middle Period. (Note: Also sometimes rendered in lowercase as middle period. The era lay in the middle span between the War of 1812 and the Civil War era.) According to Trevor Burnard in 2011, the era "used to be called the Middle Period". This span of years has also been called the Antebellum Era or Antebellum Period. (Note: Sometimes rendered in lowercase as the antebellum era or antebellum period.) The word antebellum comes from the Latin ante bellum, meaning "before the war", and the age preceded the Civil War era.

Another name for the time period has been the Age of Jackson or Jacksonian era, (Note: Sometimes with varying capitalization as in age of Jackson or Jacksonian Era.) named after American president Andrew Jackson, said to have defined the era as a time when popular democracy became the United States' norm and ideal. Historian Daniel Walker Howe criticized this name, arguing that although Jackson used democratic rhetoric, his presidency was authoritarian and did not broadly represent the country.

== Era of Good Feelings and the rise of nationalism ==
After the War of 1812, the United States began to assert a newfound sense of nationalism. America began to rally around national heroes like Andrew Jackson. Patriotic feelings were aroused by Francis Scott Key's poem The Star-Spangled Banner. Under the direction of Chief Justice John Marshall, the Supreme Court issued a series of opinions reinforcing the role of the national government. These decisions included McCulloch v. Maryland and Gibbons v. Ogden, both of which reaffirmed the supremacy of the national government over the states. The signing of the Adams–Onís Treaty helped settle the western border of the country through popular and peaceable means.

=== Sectionalism ===
Even as nationalism increased across the country, its effects were limited by a renewed sense of sectionalism. The New England states that had opposed the War of 1812 felt an increasing decline in political power with the demise of the Federalist Party. This loss was tempered with the arrival of a new industrial movement and increased demands for northern banking. The Industrial Revolution in the United States was advanced by the immigration of Samuel Slater from Great Britain and arrival of textile mills beginning in Lowell, Massachusetts. In the south, the invention of the cotton gin by Eli Whitney radically increased the value of slave labor. The export of southern cotton was now the predominant export of the U.S. The western states continued to thrive under the "frontier spirit." Individualism was prized as exemplified by Davey Crockett and James Fenimore Cooper's folk hero Natty Bumppo from Leatherstocking Tales. Following the death of Tecumseh in 1813, Native Americans lacked the unity to stop white settlement.

=== Era of Good Feelings ===
Domestically, the presidency of James Monroe (1817–1825) was hailed at the time and since as the "Era of Good Feelings" because of the decline of partisan politics and heated rhetoric after the war. The Federalist Party faded away, but without an opponent the Democratic-Republican Party decayed as well, since the sectional interests came to the fore.

The Monroe Doctrine was drafted by Secretary of State John Quincy Adams in collaboration with the British, and proclaimed by Monroe in late 1823. He asserted the Americas should be free from additional European colonization and free from European interference in sovereign countries' affairs. It further stated the United States' intention to stay neutral in wars between European powers and their colonies but to consider any new colonies or interference with independent countries in the Americas as hostile acts towards the United States. No new colonies were ever formed.

=== Annexation of Florida and border treaties ===
As the 19th century dawned, Florida had been undisputed Spanish territory for almost 250 years, aside from 20 years of British control between the French and Indian Wars and the American Revolution. Although a sparsely inhabited swampland, expansionist-minded Americans were eager to grab it and already, in 1808, American settlers had invaded the westernmost tip of Florida and expelled the local Spanish authorities, after which Congress hastily passed a bill annexing it under the claim that the Louisiana Purchase had guaranteed the territory to the United States. During the War of 1812, American troops occupied and seized the area around Mobile Bay. Spain, then engulfed in war with France, did not react to either of these actions. Also taking advantage of the mother country's distraction, Spain's Latin American colonies rose up in revolt and Madrid was forced to denude Florida of troops to suppress the rebellions. As the Spanish withdrew, Native American and pirate raids from Florida to the US increased. In 1818, Andrew Jackson led an army into Florida to quell the chaotic situation there. He arrested and hanged two British agents who had been encouraging Indian raids, leading to an outcry in London and calls for war. However, cooler heads prevailed and the situation did not escalate further. A year later, Secretary of State John Quincy Adams negotiated the Adams–Onís Treaty with Spain. The Spanish agreed to turn over the no-longer-defensible Florida to the US and also give up their extremely flimsy claims to the distant Oregon Territory, in exchange for which American claims on Texas were renounced (some Americans had also been claiming parts of that territory under the Louisiana Purchase). The heretofore vague border between the US and Spanish North America was also settled upon. Although American designs on Texas did not disappear, they were put on the backburner for the more immediately important Florida.

Meanwhile, in 1818, the U.S. and Britain also agreed to settle the western border with Canada, which was established at the 49th parallel running straight from the Great Lakes to the Rocky Mountains. Included in this settlement was the headwaters of the Red River in what would eventually become Minnesota, and the Mesabi Range, which eventually proved to contain vast amounts of iron ore. The eastern border of Canada continued to be disputed and was not settled until 1845.

== Emergence of Second Party System ==
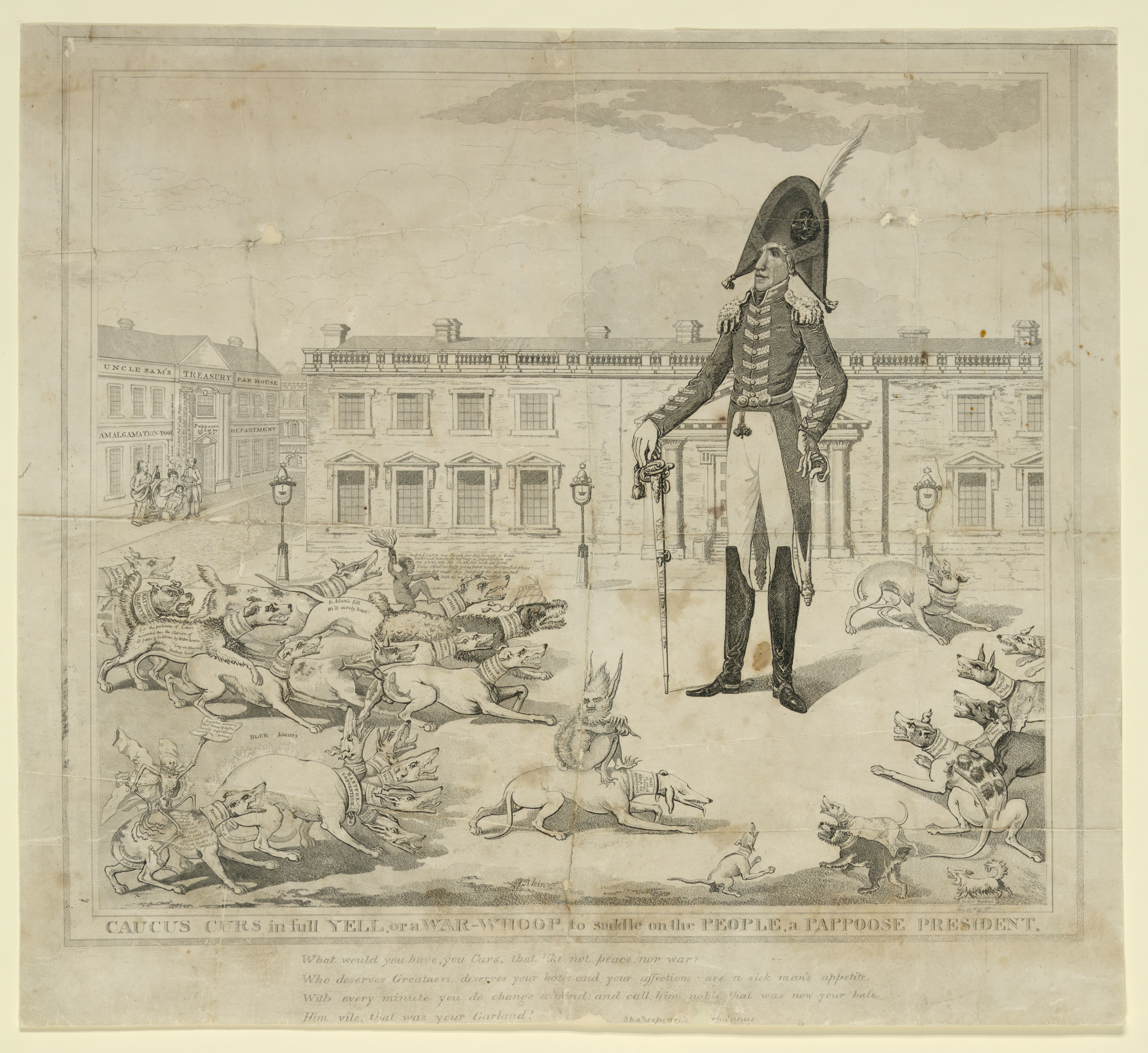
Caucus curs in full yell, by James Akin, 1824 (critique of "the press's treatment of Andrew Jackson, and on the practice of nominating candidates by caucus")

Monroe was re-elected without opposition in 1820, and the old caucus system for selecting Republican candidates soon collapsed into factions. In the presidential election of 1824, factions in Tennessee and Pennsylvania put forth Andrew Jackson. From Kentucky came Speaker of the House Henry Clay, while Massachusetts produced Secretary of State Adams; a rump congressional caucus put forward Treasury Secretary William H. Crawford. Personality and sectional allegiance played important roles in determining the outcome of the election. Adams won the electoral votes from New England and most of New York; Clay won his western base of Kentucky, Ohio, and Missouri; Jackson won his base in the Southeast, and plus Illinois, Indiana, North Carolina, South Carolina, Pennsylvania, Maryland, and New Jersey; and Crawford won his base in the South, Virginia, Georgia, and Delaware. No candidate gained a majority in the Electoral College, so the president was selected by the House of Representatives, where Clay was the most influential figure. In return for Clay's support in winning the presidency, John Quincy Adams appointed Clay as secretary of state in what Jacksonians denounced as a corrupt bargain.

During Adams' administration, new party alignments appeared. Adams' followers took the name of "National Republicans", to reflect the mainstream of Jeffersonian Republicanism. Elected with less than 35% of the popular vote, Adams was a minority president and his cold, aloof personality did not win many friends. Adams was also a poor politician and alienated potential political allies with his commitment to principles when he refused to remove Federal officeholders and replace them with supporters out of patronage. A strong nationalist, he called for the construction of national road networks and canals and renewed George Washington's call for a national academy. Adams even went so far as to suggest the construction of astronomical observatories to rival those of Europe. These extravagant proposals offended many average Americans. Southerners in particular opposed them because they would require continued heavy tariffs, and they feared government overreach of this type could easily lead to action taken against slavery. Adams had little to boast about in domestic affairs.

Despite his sterling career in foreign affairs, Adams also proved less than successful at foreign policy. His old rival, British Foreign Secretary George Canning, played a cat-and-mouse game with him. Ever since the Treaty of Paris 42 years earlier, Britain had barred American merchantmen from doing business in its islands in the West Indies, although smugglers frequently evaded this ban. When Adams demanded that London open the islands to trade, Canning rejected his request. Another fiasco for the president occurred when the newly independent Latin American republics held a congress in Panama in 1826. Adams requested permission and funding from Congress to send two delegates. Some Congressmen worried about becoming involved in foreign entanglements, while Southerners, sensitive to racial issues, disliked the idea of granting recognition and equal status to the "black" and "mixed" Latin American states. Although Adams was ultimately successful in getting approval, one of the two delegates died en route to Panama and the Panama Congress ultimately accomplished little of value.

=== Jacksonian democracy ===
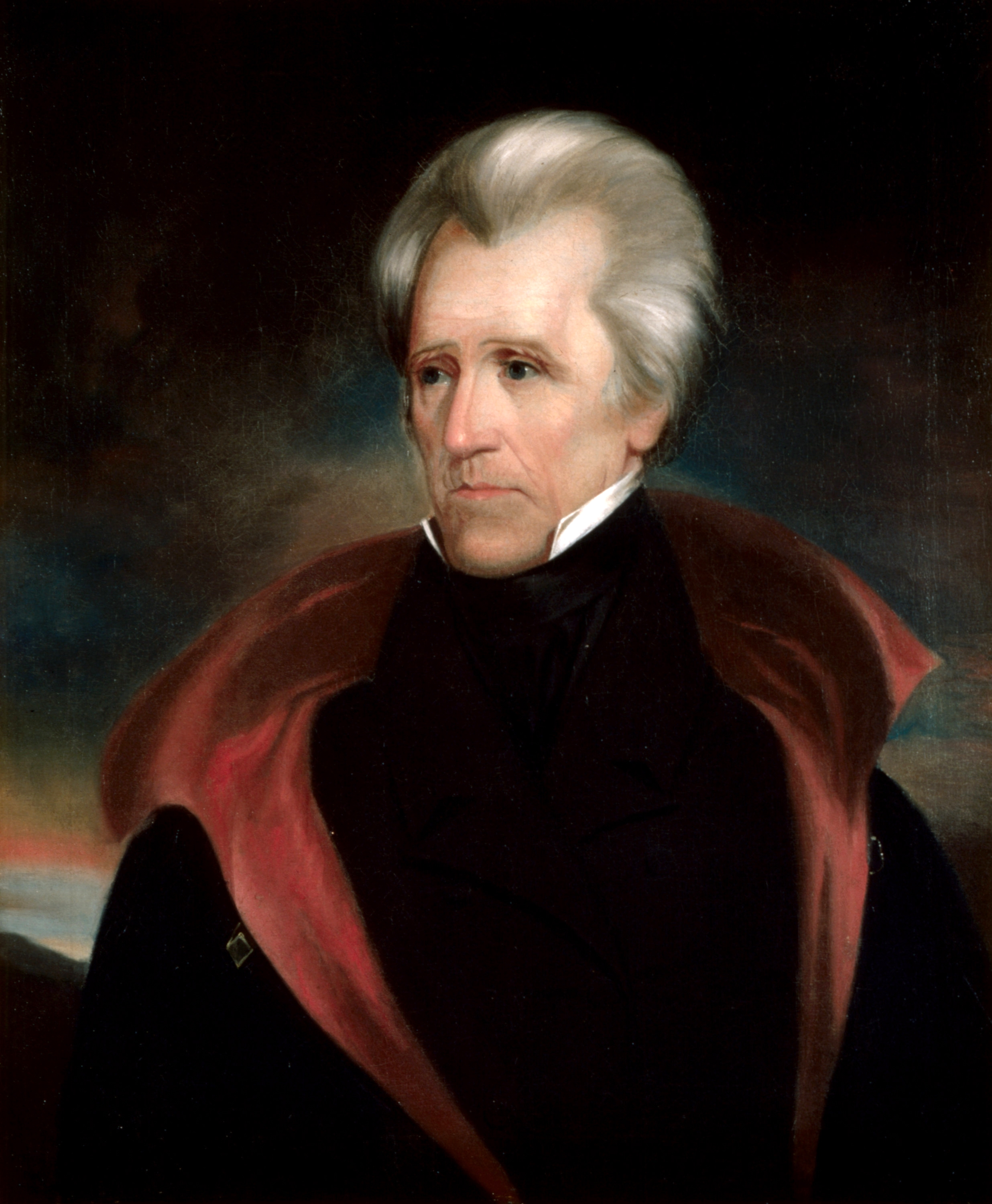
President Andrew Jackson

The charismatic Andrew Jackson collaborated with Martin Van Buren to rally his followers in the newly formed Democratic Party. In the election of 1828, Jackson defeated Adams by an overwhelming electoral majority in the first presidential election since 1800 to mark a wholesale voter rejection of the previous administration's policies. The electoral campaign was correspondingly as vicious as the one 28 years earlier, with Jackson and Adams camps hurtling the worst mudslinging accusations at one another. The former painted himself as a war hero and the champion of the masses against Northeastern elites while the latter argued that he was a man of education and social grace against an uncouth, semi-literate backwoodsman. This belied the fact that Andrew Jackson was a societal elite by any definition, owning a large plantation with dozens of slaves and mostly surrounding himself with men of wealth and property. The election saw the coming to power of Jacksonian democracy, thus marking the transition from the First Party System (which reflected Jeffersonian democracy) to the Second Party System. Historians debate the significance of the election, with many arguing that it marked the beginning of modern American politics, with the decisive establishment of democracy and the formation of the two party system.

When Jackson took office on March 4, 1829, many doubted if he would survive his term in office. A week short of his 63rd birthday, he was the oldest man yet elected president and suffering from the effects of old battle wounds. He also had a frequent hacking cough and sometimes spit up blood. The inauguration ball became a notorious event in the history of the American presidency as a large mob of guests swarmed through the White House, tracking dirt and mud everywhere, and consuming a giant cheese that had been presented as an inaugural gift to the president. A contemporary journalist described the spectacle as "the reign of King Mob".

=== Suffrage of all white men ===
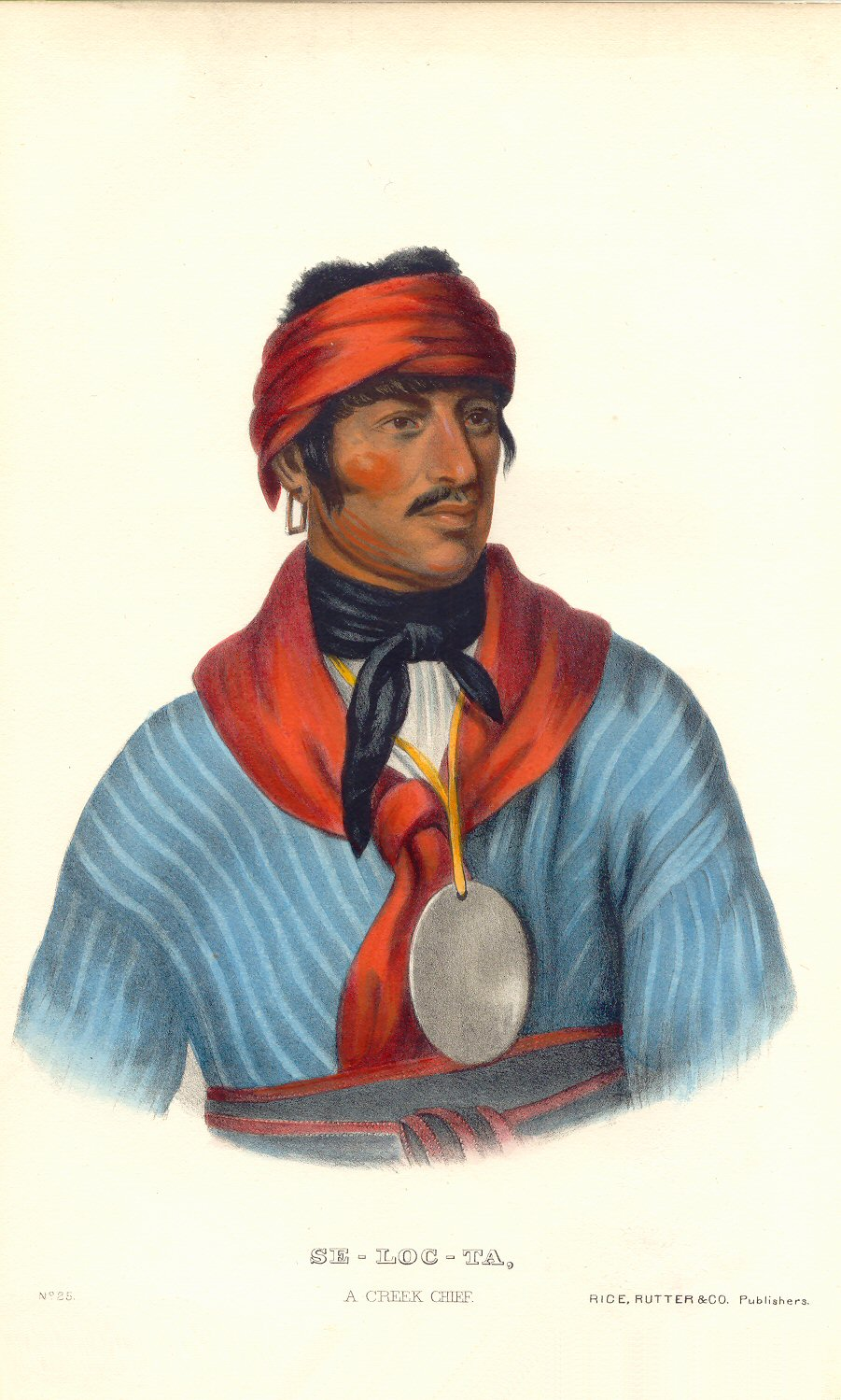
Selocta Chinnabby (or Shelocta) was a Muscogee chief who appealed to Andrew Jackson to reduce the demands for Creek lands at the signing of the Treaty of Fort Jackson.

Starting in the 1820s, American politics became more democratic as many state and local offices went from being appointed to elective, and the old requirements for voters to own property were abolished. Voice voting in states gave way to ballots printed by the parties, and by the 1830s, presidential electors were chosen directly by the voters in all states except South Carolina. Jacksonian democracy drew its support from the small farmers of the West, and the workers, artisans and small merchants of the East. They favored geographical expansion to create more farms for people like them, and distrusted the upper classes who envisioned an industrial nation built on finance and manufacturing. The entrepreneurs, for whom Henry Clay and Daniel Webster were heroes, fought back and formed the Whig party.

Political machines appeared early in the history of the United States, and for all the exhortations of Jacksonian Democracy, it was they and not the average voter that nominated candidates. In addition, the system supported establishment politicians and party loyalists, and much of the legislation was designed to reward men and businesses who supported a particular party or candidate. As a consequence, the chance of single issue and ideology-based candidates being elected to major office dwindled and so those parties who were successful were pragmatist ones which appealed to multiple constituencies.

Single issue parties included the Anti-Masonic Party, which emerged in the Northeastern states. Its goal was to outlaw Freemasonry as a violation of republicanism; its members were energized by reports that a man who threatened to expose Masonic secrets had been murdered. They ran a candidate for president (William Wirt) in 1832; he won 8% of the popular vote nationwide, carried Vermont, and ran well in rural Pennsylvania and Massachusetts. The party then merged into the new Whig Party. Others included abolitionist parties, workers' parties like the Workingmen's Party, the Locofocos (who opposed monopolies), and assorted nativist parties who denounced the Roman Catholic Church as a threat to republicanism. None of these parties were capable of mounting a broad enough appeal to voters or winning major elections.

The election of 1828 was a significant benchmark, marking the climax of the trend toward broader voter eligibility and participation. Vermont had universal male suffrage since its entry into the Union, and Tennessee permitted suffrage for the vast majority of taxpayers. New Jersey, Maryland, and South Carolina all abolished property and tax-paying requirements between 1807 and 1810. States entering the Union after 1815 either had universal white male suffrage or a low taxpaying requirement. From 1815 to 1821, Connecticut, Massachusetts and New York abolished all property requirements. In 1824, members of the Electoral College were still selected by six state legislatures. By 1828, presidential electors were chosen by popular vote in every state but Delaware and South Carolina. Nothing dramatized this democratic sentiment more than the election of Andrew Jackson. In addition, the 1828 election marked the decisive emergence of the West as a major political bloc and an end to the dominance of the original 13 states on national affairs.

=== Indian removal ===
In 1830, Congress passed the Indian Removal Act, which authorized the president to negotiate treaties that exchanged Indian tribal lands in the eastern states for lands west of the Mississippi River. In 1834, a special Indian Territory was established in what is now the eastern part of Oklahoma. In all, Native American tribes signed 94 treaties during Jackson's two terms, ceding thousands of square miles to the Federal government.

The Cherokees insisted on their independence from state government authority and faced expulsion from their lands when a faction of Cherokees signed the Treaty of New Echota in 1835, obtaining money in exchange for their land. Despite protests from the elected Cherokee government and many white supporters, the Cherokees were forced to trek to the Indian Territory in 1838. Many died of disease and privation in the "Trail of Tears".

=== Nullification crisis ===
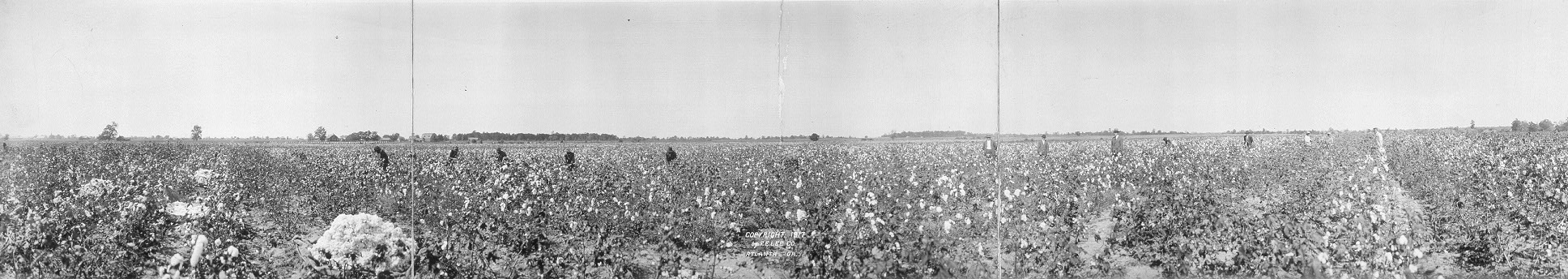
Picking cotton in Georgia (Larger version)

Toward the end of his first term, Jackson was forced to confront the state of South Carolina on the issue of the protective tariff. The protective tariff passed by Congress and signed into law by Jackson in 1832 was milder than that of 1828, but it further embittered many in the state. In response, several South Carolina citizens endorsed the "states rights" principle of "nullification", which was enunciated by John C. Calhoun, Jackson's vice president until 1832, in his South Carolina Exposition and Protest (1828). South Carolina dealt with the tariff by adopting the Ordinance of Nullification, which declared both the Tariff of 1828 and the Tariff of 1832 null and void within state borders.

Nullification was only the most recent in a series of state challenges to the authority of the federal government. In response to South Carolina's threat, Jackson sent seven small naval vessels and a man-of-war to Charleston in November 1832. On December 10, he issued a resounding proclamation against the nullifiers. South Carolina, the President declared, stood on "the brink of insurrection and treason", and he appealed to the people of the state to reassert their allegiance to that Union for which their ancestors had fought.

Senator Henry Clay, though an advocate of protection and a political rival of Jackson, piloted a compromise measure through Congress. Clay's 1833 compromise tariff specified that all duties more than 20% of the value of the goods imported were to be reduced by easy stages, so that by 1842, the duties on all articles would reach the level of the moderate tariff of 1816.

The rest of the South declared South Carolina's course unwise and unconstitutional. Eventually, South Carolina rescinded its action. Jackson had committed the federal government to the principle of Union supremacy. South Carolina, however, had obtained many of the demands it sought and had demonstrated that a single state could force its will on Congress.

=== Banking ===
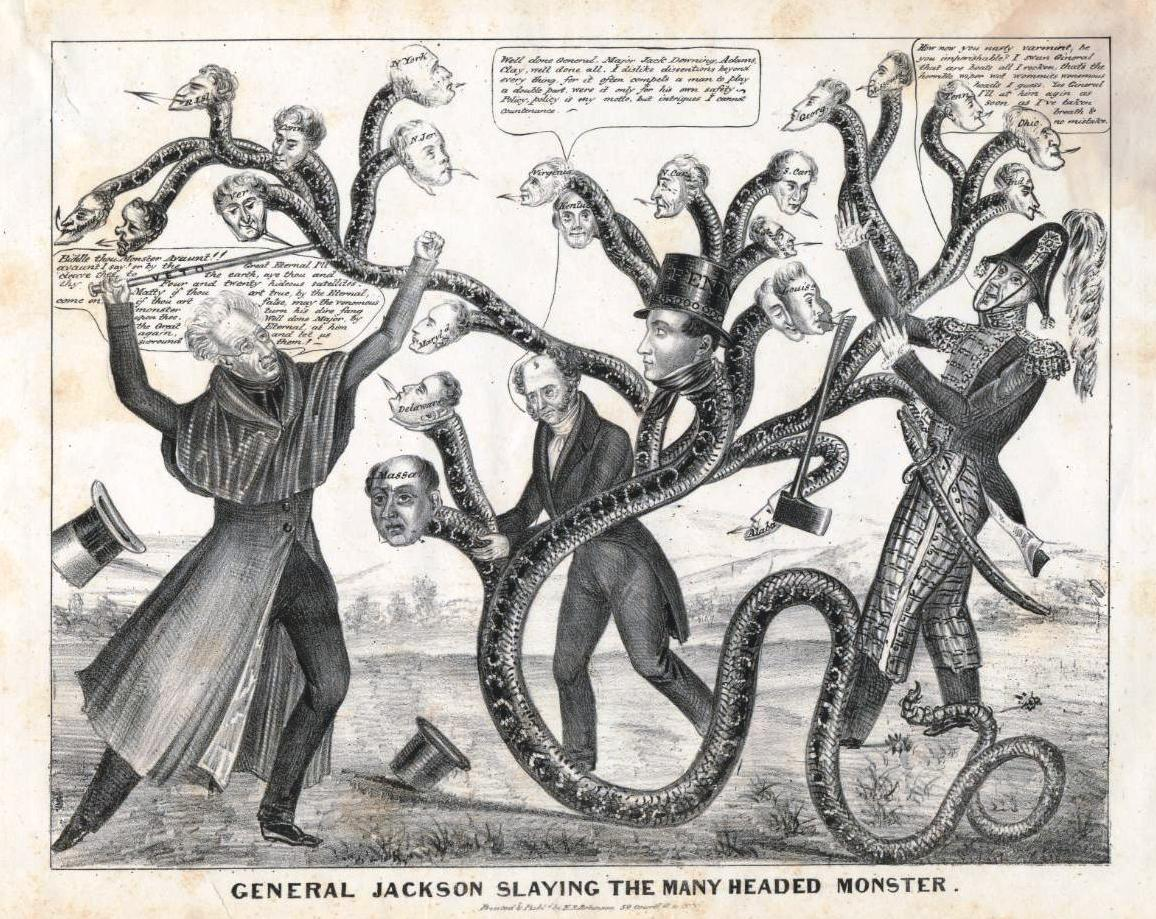
Jackson slays the many-headed monster that is the Bank of the United States

Even before the nullification issue had been settled, another controversy arose to challenge Jackson's leadership. It concerned the rechartering of the Second Bank of the United States. The First Bank of the United States had been established in 1791, under Alexander Hamilton's guidance and had been chartered for a 20-year period. After the Revolutionary War, the United States had a large war debt to France and others, and the banking system of the fledgling nation was in disarray, as state banks printed their own currency, and the plethora of different bank notes made commerce difficult. Hamilton's national bank had been chartered to solve the debt problem and to unify the nation under one currency. While it stabilized the currency and stimulated trade, it was resented by Westerners and workers who believed that it was granting special favors to a few powerful men. When its charter expired in 1811, it was not renewed.

For the next few years, the banking business was in the hands of State-Chartered banks, which issued currency in excessive amounts, creating great confusion and fueling inflation and concerns that state banks could not provide the country with a uniform currency. The absence of a national bank during the War of 1812 greatly hindered financial operations of the government; therefore a second Bank of the United States was created in 1816.

From its inception, the Second Bank was unpopular in the newer states and territories and with less prosperous people everywhere. Opponents claimed the bank possessed a virtual monopoly over the country's credit and currency, and reiterated that it represented the interests of the wealthy elite. Jackson, elected as a popular champion against it, vetoed a bill to recharter the bank. He also detested banks due to a brush with bankruptcy in his youth. In his message to Congress, he denounced monopoly and special privilege, saying that "our rich men have not been content with equal protection and equal benefits, but have besought us to make them richer by act of Congress".

In the election campaign that followed, the bank question caused a fundamental division between the merchant, manufacturing and financial interests (generally creditors who favored tight money and high interest rates), and the laboring and agrarian sectors, who were often in debt to banks and therefore favored an increased money supply and lower interest rates. The outcome was an enthusiastic endorsement of "Jacksonism". Jackson saw his reelection in 1832 as a popular mandate to crush the bank irrevocably; he found a ready-made weapon in a provision of the bank's charter authorizing the removal of public funds.

In September 1833 Jackson ordered that no more government money be deposited in the bank and that the money already in its custody be gradually withdrawn in the ordinary course of meeting the expenses of government. Carefully selected state banks, stringently restricted, were provided as a substitute. For the next generation, the US would get by on a relatively unregulated state banking system. This banking system helped fuel westward expansion through easy credit, but kept the nation vulnerable to periodic panics. It was not until the Civil War that the Federal government again chartered a national bank.

Jackson groomed Martin Van Buren as his successor, and he was easily elected president in 1836. However, a few months into his administration, the country fell into a deep economic slump known as the Panic of 1837, caused in large part by excessive speculation. Banks failed and unemployment soared. It was a devastating economic and social catastrophe that can be compared with the Panic of 1893 and the Great Depression of 1929, an event with repercussions every bit as deep as the Great Depression of the 1930s. There was an international dimension: much of the growth in the private sector and the investment in infrastructure by state governments had been financed by British capital. Several states and corporations defaulted permanently on their debts owed to London. For Europeans, investment in America became a dubious proposition, so American access to capital sharply declined for decades.

The depression had its roots in Jackson's economic hard money policies that blocked investment using paper money, insisting on gold and silver. But he had retired so his chosen successor van Buren was blamed for the disaster. In the 1840 presidential election, he was defeated by the Whig candidate William Henry Harrison and his running on a "People's Crusade" platform, despite descending from a plantation family. However, his presidency would prove a non-starter when he fell ill with pneumonia and died after only a month in office. John Tyler, the new vice president, succeeded him. Tyler was not popular since he had not been elected to the presidency, and was widely referred to as "His Accidency". He rejected Whig economic policies, so that party expelled him, and the Whigs lost their opportunity to reshape government policy.

Economic historians have explored the high degree of financial and economic instability in the Jacksonian era. For the most part, they follow the conclusions of Peter Temin, who absolved Jackson's policies, and blamed international events beyond American control, such as conditions in Mexico, China and Britain. A survey of economic historians in 1995 show that the vast majority concur with Temin's conclusion that "the inflation and financial crisis of the 1830s had their origin in events largely beyond President Jackson's control and would have taken place whether or not he had acted as he did vis-a-vis the Second Bank of the U.S."

== Age of Reform ==
Spurred on by the Second Great Awakening, Americans entered a period of rapid social change and experimentation. New social movements arose, as well as many new alternatives to traditional religious thought. This period of American history was marked by the destruction of some traditional roles of society and the erection of new social standards. One of the unique aspects of the Age of Reform was that it was heavily grounded in religion, unlike the anti-clericalism that characterized contemporary European reformers.

=== Second Great Awakening ===
The Second Great Awakening was a Protestant religious revival movement that flourished in 1800–1840 in every region. It expressed Arminian theology by which every person could be saved through a direct personal confrontation with Jesus Christ during an intensely emotional revival meeting. Millions joined the churches, often new denominations. Many converts believed that the Awakening heralded a new millennial age, so that the Second Great Awakening stimulated the establishment of many reform movements designed to remedy the evils of society before the Second Coming of Jesus Christ. For example, the charismatic Charles Grandison Finney, in upstate New York and the Old Northwest was highly effective. At the Rochester Revival of 1830, prominent citizens concerned with the city's poverty and absenteeism had invited Finney to the city. The wave of religious revival contributed to tremendous growth of the Methodist, Baptists, Disciples, and other evangelical denominations.

==== Utopians ====
As the Second Great Awakening challenged the traditional beliefs of the Calvinist faith, the movement inspired other groups to call into question their views on religion and society. Many of these utopianist groups also believed in millennialism which prophesied the return of Christ and the beginning of a new age. The Harmony Society made three attempts to effect a millennial society with the most notable example at New Harmony, Indiana. Later, Scottish industrialist Robert Owen bought New Harmony and attempted to form a secular Utopian community there. Frenchman Charles Fourier began a similar secular experiment with his "phalanxes" spread across the Midwestern United States. However, none of these utopian communities lasted very long except for the Shakers.

One of the earliest movements was that of the Shakers, who held all their possessions in "common" and lived in a prosperous, inventive, self-supporting society, with no sexual activity. The Shakers, founded by an English immigrant to the United States Mother Ann Lee, peaked at around 6,000 in 1850 in communities from Maine to Kentucky. The Shakers condemned sexuality and demanded absolute celibacy. New members could only come from conversions, and from children brought to the Shaker villages. The Shakers persist to this day—there is still an active Shaker community in Sabbathday Lake, Maine—but the Shaker population declined dramatically by the Civil War. They are famed for their design, especially their furniture and handicrafts.

The Perfectionist movement, led by John Humphrey Noyes, founded the utopian Oneida Community in 1848 with fifty-one devotees, in Oneida, New York. Noyes believed that the act of final conversion led to absolute and complete release from sin. The Oneida Community believed in the abolition of marriage or monogamous relationships and that sex should be free to whoever consented to it. As opposed to 20th century social movements such as the Sexual revolution of the 1960s, the Onedians did not seek consequence-free sex for mere pleasure, but believed that, because the logical outcome of intercourse was pregnancy, that raising children should be a communal responsibility. After the original founders died or became elderly, their children rejected the concept of free love and returned to traditional family models. Oneida thrived for many years as a joint-stock company and continues today as a silverware company.

Mormon history began in this era under Joseph Smith's guidance after he experienced a religious conversion. Because of their unusual beliefs, which included recognition of the Book of Mormon as an additional book of scripture comparable to the Bible, Mormons were rejected by mainstream Christians and forced to flee en masse from upstate New York to Ohio, to Missouri and then to Nauvoo, Illinois, where Smith was killed and they were again forced to flee. They settled around the Great Salt Lake, then part of Mexico. In 1848, the region came under American control and later formed the Utah Territory. National policy was to suppress polygamy, and Utah was only admitted as a state in 1896 after the Church of Jesus Christ of Latter-day Saints backtracked from Smith's demand that all the leaders practice polygamy.

For Americans wishing to bridge the gap between the earthly and spiritual worlds, spiritualism provided a means of communing with the dead. Spiritualists used mediums to communicate between the living and the dead through a variety of different means. The Fox sisters, the most famous mediums, claimed to have a direct link to the spirit world. Spiritualism would gain a much larger following after the heavy number of casualties during the Civil War; First Lady Mary Todd Lincoln was a believer.

Other groups seeking spiritual awakening also gained popularity in the mid-19th century. Philosopher Ralph Waldo Emerson began the American transcendentalist movement in New England, to promote self-reliance and better understanding of the universe through contemplation of the over-soul. Transcendentalism was essentially an American offshoot of the Romantic movement in Europe. Among transcendentalists' core beliefs was an ideal spiritual state that "transcends" the physical, and is only realized through intuition rather than doctrine. Like many of the movements, the transcendentalists split over the idea of self-reliance. While Emerson and Henry David Thoreau promoted the idea of independent living, George Ripley brought transcendentalists together in a phalanx at Brook Farm to live cooperatively. Other authors such as Nathaniel Hawthorne and Edgar Allan Poe rejected transcendentalist beliefs.

So many of these new religious and spiritual groups began or concentrated within miles of each other in upstate New York that this area was nicknamed "the burned-over district" because so few people had not converted.

=== Public schools movement ===
Education in the United States had long been a local affair with schools governed by locally elected school boards. As with much of the culture of the United States, education varied widely in the North and the South. In the New England states public education was common, although it was often class-based with the working class receiving little benefits. Instruction and curriculum were all locally determined and teachers were expected to meet rigorous demands of strict moral behaviour. Schools taught religious values and applied Calvinist philosophies of discipline which included corporal punishment and public humiliation. In the South, there was very little organization of a public education system. Public schools were very rare and most education took place in the home with the family acting as instructors. The wealthier planter families hired tutors for instruction in the classics, but many yeoman farming families had little access to education outside of the family unit.

The reform movement in education began in Massachusetts when Horace Mann started the common school movement. Mann advocated a statewide curriculum and instituted financing of school through local property taxes. Mann also fought protracted battles against the Calvinist influence in discipline, preferring positive reinforcement to physical punishment. Most children learned to read and write and spell from Noah Webster's Blue Backed Speller and later the McGuffey Readers. The readings inculcated moral values as well as literacy. Most states tried to emulate Massachusetts, and New England retained its leadership position for another century. German immigrants brought in kindergartens and the Gymnasium (school), while Yankee orators sponsored the Lyceum movement that provided popular education for hundreds of towns and small cities.

=== Asylum movement ===
The social conscience that was raised in the early 19th century helped to elevate the awareness of mental illness and its treatment. A leading advocate of reform for mental illness was Dorothea Dix, a Massachusetts woman who made an intensive study of the conditions that the mentally ill were kept in. Dix's report to the Massachusetts state legislature along with the development of the Kirkbride Plan helped to alleviate the miserable conditions for many of the mentally ill. Although these facilities often fell short of their intended purpose, reformers continued to follow Dix's advocacy and call for increased study and treatment of mental illness.

=== Women ===
Feminist essays from John Neal in the 1820s filled an intellectual gap between Judith Sargent Murray and her pre-Seneca Falls Convention successors like Sarah Moore Grimké, Elizabeth Cady Stanton, and Margaret Fuller. As a male writer insulated from many common forms of attack against female feminist thinkers, Neal's advocacy was crucial to bringing the field back into the American mainstream.

During the building of the new republic, American women gained a limited political voice in what is known as republican motherhood. Under this philosophy, as promoted by leaders such as Abigail Adams, women were seen as the protectors of liberty and republicanism. Mothers were charged with passing down these ideals to their children through instruction of patriotic thoughts and feelings. During the 1830s and 1840s, many of the changes in the status of women that occurred in the post-Revolutionary period—such as the belief in love between spouses and the role of women in the home—continued at an accelerated pace. This was an age of reform movements, in which Americans sought to improve the moral fiber of themselves and of their nation in unprecedented numbers. The wife's role in this process was important because she was seen as the cultivator of morality in her husband and children. Besides domesticity, women were also expected to be pious, pure, and submissive to men. These four components were considered by many at the time to be "the natural state" of womanhood, echoes of this ideology still existing today. The view that the wife should find fulfillment in these values is called the Cult of True Womanhood or the Cult of Domesticity.

Under the doctrine of two spheres, women were to exist in the "domestic sphere" at home while their husbands operated in the "public sphere" of politics and business. Women took on the new role of "softening" their husbands and instructing their children in piety and republican values, while men handled the business and financial affairs of the family. Some doctors of this period even went so far as to suggest that women should not get an education, lest they divert blood away from the uterus to the brain and produce weak children. The coverture laws ensured that men would hold political power over their wives.

=== Anti-slavery movements ===
By 1800, many political leaders were convinced that slavery was undesirable, and should eventually be abolished, and the slaves returned to their natural homes in Africa. The American Colonization Society, which was active in both North and South, tried to implement these ideas and established the colony of Liberia in Africa to repatriate slaves out of white society. Prominent leaders included Henry Clay and President James Monroe—who gave his name to Monrovia, the capital of Liberia. However, after 1840 many abolitionists rejected the idea of repatriation to Africa.

The abolitionist movement among white Protestants was based on evangelical principles of the Second Great Awakening. Evangelist Theodore Weld led abolitionist revivals that called for immediate emancipation of slaves. William Lloyd Garrison founded The Liberator, an anti-slavery newspaper, and the American Anti-Slavery Society to call for abolition. A controversial figure, Garrison often was the focus of public anger. His advocacy of women's rights and inclusion of women in the leadership of the society caused a rift within the movement. Rejecting Garrison's idea that abolition and women's rights were connected Lewis Tappan broke with the society and formed the American and Foreign Anti-Slavery Society. Most abolitionists were not as extreme as Garrison, who vowed that The Liberator would not cease publication until slavery was abolished.

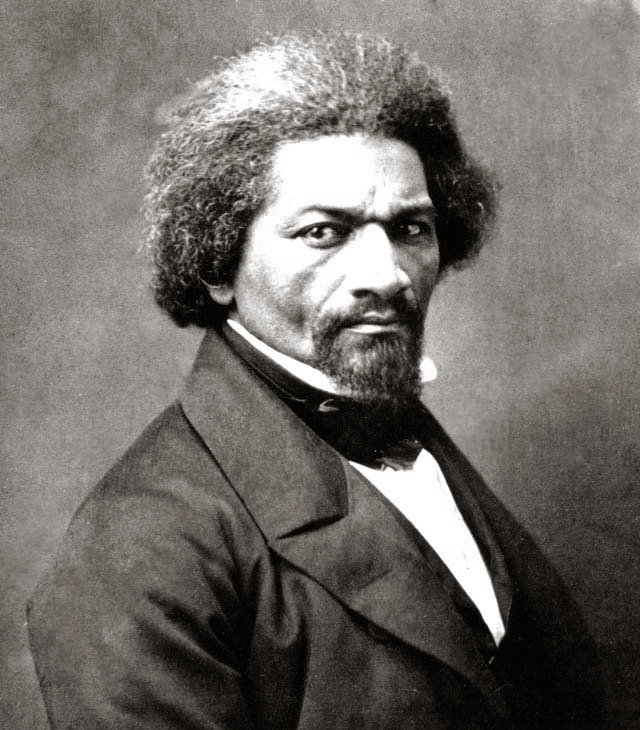
Frederick Douglass

White abolitionists did not always face agreeable communities in the North. Garrison was almost lynched in Boston while newspaper publisher Elijah Lovejoy was killed in Alton, Illinois. The anger over abolition even spilled over into Congress where a gag rule was instituted to prevent any discussion of slavery on the floor of either chamber. Most whites viewed African-Americans as an inferior race and had little taste for abolitionists, often assuming that all were like Garrison. African-Americans had little freedom even in states where slavery was not permitted. They were shunned by whites, subjected to discriminatory laws, and often forced to compete with Irish immigrants for menial, low-wage jobs. In the South, meanwhile, planters argued that slavery was necessary to operate their plantations profitably and that emancipated slaves would attempt to Africanize the country as they had done in Haiti.

Both free-born African American citizens and former slaves took on leading roles in abolitionism as well. The most prominent spokesperson for abolition in the African American community was Frederick Douglass, an escaped slave whose eloquent condemnations of slavery drew both crowds of supporters as well as threats against his life. Douglass was a keen user of the printed word both through his newspaper The North Star and three best-selling autobiographies.

At one extreme David Walker published An Appeal to the Colored Citizens of the World calling for African American revolt against white tyranny. The Underground Railroad helped some slaves out of the South through a series of trails and safe houses known as "stations." Known as "conductors", escaped slaves volunteered to return to the South to lead others to safety; former slaves, such as Harriet Tubman, risked their lives on these journeys.

=== Women as abolitionists ===
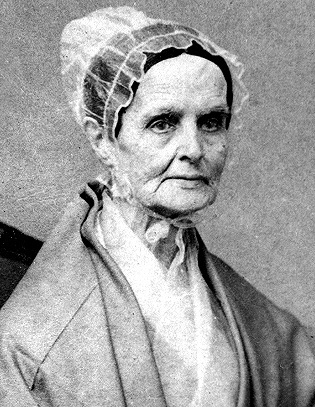
Lucretia Mott

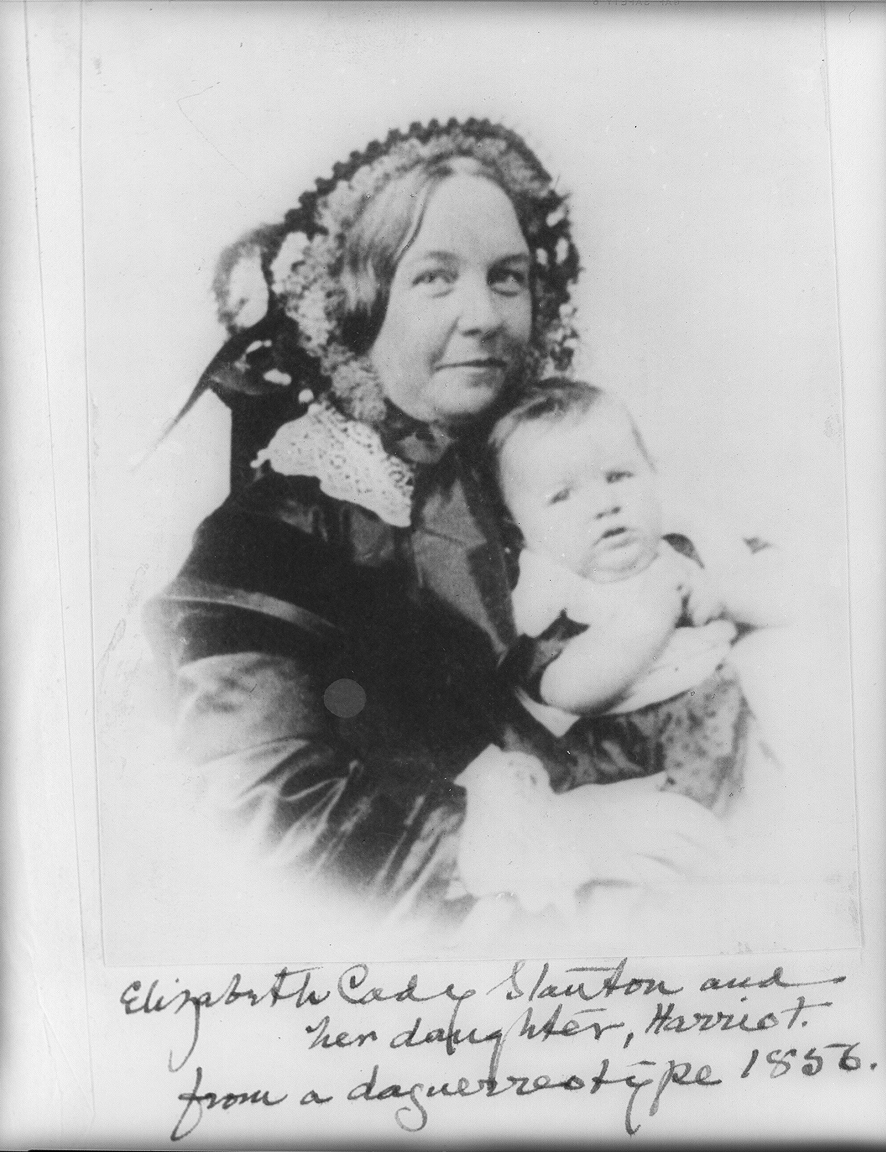
Elizabeth Cady Stanton

Angelia and Sarah Grimké were southerners who moved North to advocate against slavery. The American Anti-Slavery Society welcomed women. Garrison along with Elizabeth Cady Stanton and Lucretia Mott were so appalled that women were not allowed to participate at the World Anti-Slavery Convention in London that they called for a women's rights convention in Seneca Falls, New York. It was at this convention that Sojourner Truth became recognized as a leading spokesperson for both abolition and women's rights. Women abolitionists increasingly began to compare women's situation with the plight of slaves. This new polemic squarely blamed men for all the restrictions of women's role, and argued that the relationship between the sexes was one-sided, controlling and oppressive. There were strong religious roots; most feminists emerged from the Quaker and Congregationalist churches in the Northeast.

=== Prohibition ===
Alcohol consumption was another target of reformers in the 1850s. Americans drank heavily, which contributed to violent behaviour, crime, health problems, and poor workplace performance. Groups such as the American Temperance Society condemned liquor as a scourge on society and urged temperance among their followers. The state of Maine attempted in 1851 to ban alcohol sales and production entirely, but it met resistance and was abandoned. The prohibition movement was forgotten during the Civil War, but would return in the 1870s.

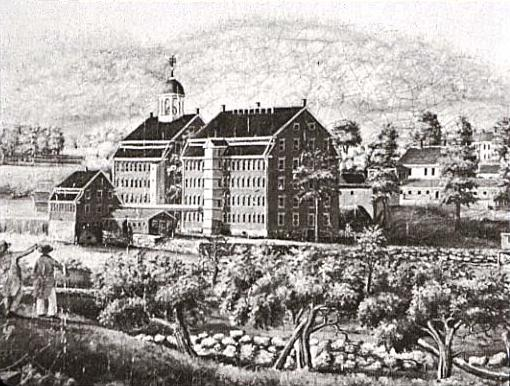
The Boston Manufacturing Company was organized in 1813 by Francis Cabot Lowell, a wealthy Boston merchant, in partnership with a group of investors known as the Boston Associates, for the manufacture of cotton textiles.

Historical movement of U.S. population. Note the major westward expansion in the 19th century.

== Economic growth ==
In this period, the United States rapidly expanded economically from an agrarian nation into an industrial power. Industrialization in America involved two important developments. First, transportation was expanded. Second, improvements were made to industrial processes such as the use of interchangeable parts and railroads to ship goods more quickly. The government helped protect American manufacturers by passing a protective tariff.

=== Social mobility ===
The steady expansion and rapid population growth of the United States after 1815 contrasted sharply with static European societies. Visitors described the rough, sometimes violent, but mostly optimistic and forward-looking attitude of most Americans. While land ownership was something most Europeans could only dream of, contemporary accounts show that the average American farmer owned his land and fed his family far more than European peasants, and could make provisions for land for his children. Europeans commonly talked of the egalitarianism of American society, which had no landed nobility and which theoretically allowed anyone regardless of birth to become successful. For example, in Germany, the universities, the bureaucracy and the army officers required high family status; in Britain rich families purchased commissions in the army for their sons for tens of thousands of pounds. Rich merchants and factory owners did emerge in Europe, but they seldom had social prestige or political power. By contrast the U.S. had more millionaires than any country in Europe by 1850. Most rich Americans had well-to-do fathers, but their grandfathers were of average wealth. Poor boys of the 1850s like Andrew Carnegie and John D. Rockefeller were two of the richest men in the world by 1900. Historians have emphasized that upward social mobility came in small steps over time, and over generations, with the Carnegie-like rags-to-riches scenario a rare one. Some ethnic groups (like Yankees, Irish and Jews) prized upward mobility, and emphasized education as the fastest route; other groups (such as Germans, Poles and Italians) emphasized family stability and home ownership more. Stagnant cities offered less mobility opportunities, leading the more ambitious young men to head to growth centers, often out west.

== Westward expansion ==
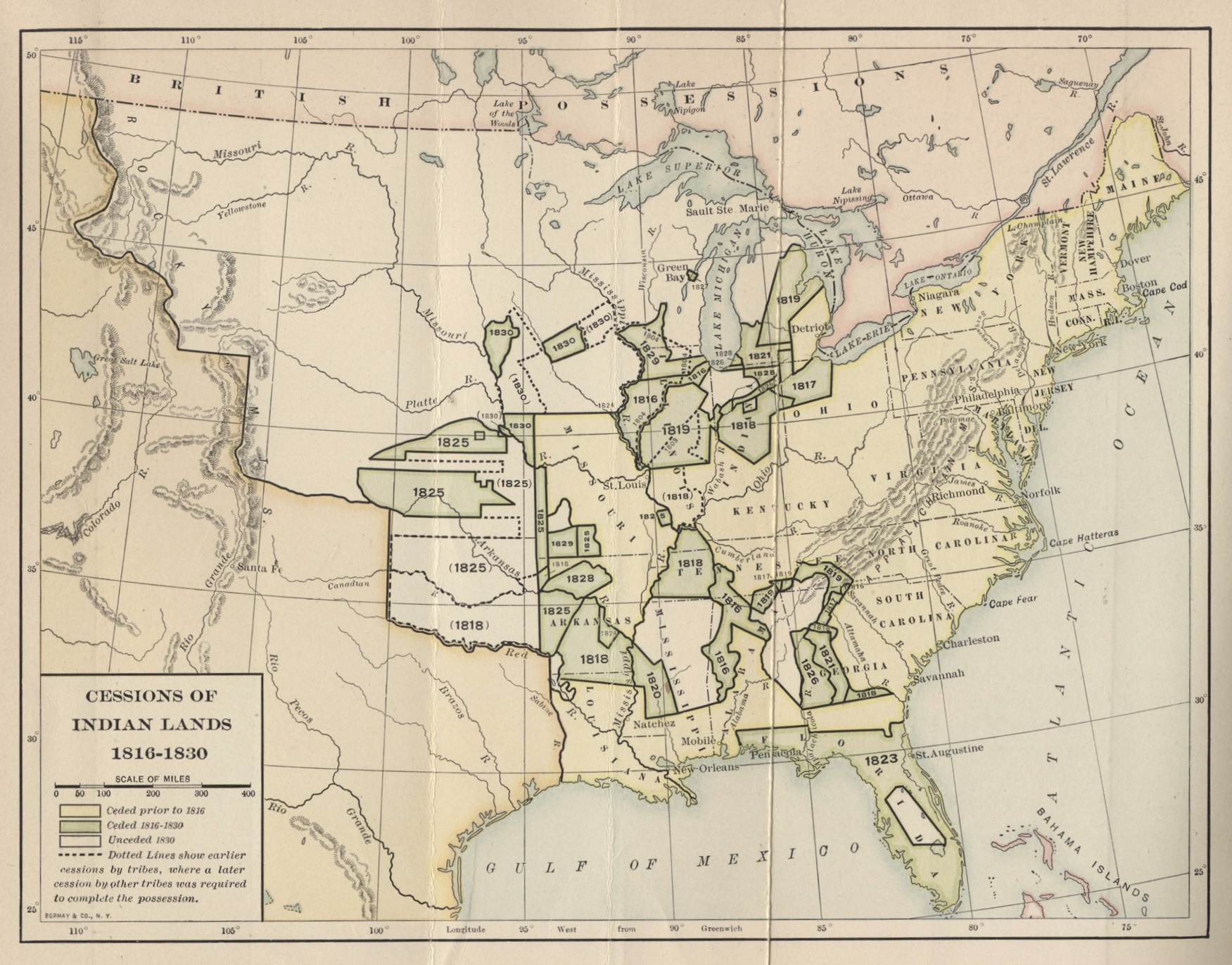
Cessions of Indian Lands (1816–1830)

After 1815, the United States shifted its attention away from foreign policy to internal development. With the defeat of the eastern Indians in the War of 1812, American settlers moved in great numbers into the rich farmlands of the Midwest. Westward expansion was mostly undertaken by groups of young families. Daniel Boone was one frontiersman who pioneered the settlement of Kentucky. In the 1830s, the federal government forcibly deported the southeastern tribes to their own reservations in the Indian territory (now Oklahoma) via the "Trail of Tears". There they received annual subsidies of food and supplies.

Before the settlers arrived in the far west the fur trappers and mountain men had their day. As skilled hunters, they trapped beaver for eventual sale to the European fashion industry. After the demise of the fur trade, they established trading posts throughout the west, continued trade with the Indians and served as guides and hunters for the western migration of settlers to Utah and the Pacific coast.

=== Texas, Oregon, California and Manifest Destiny ===
Manifest Destiny was the belief that American settlers were destined to expand across the continent. This concept was born out of "A sense of mission to redeem the Old World by high example ... generated by the potentialities of a new earth for building a new heaven". The phrase "Manifest Destiny" meant many different things to many different people, and was rejected by many Americans. Howe argues that, "American imperialism did not represent an American consensus; it provoked bitter dissent within the national polity."

Faragher's analysis of the political polarization between the Democratic Party and the Whig Party is that:

Most Democrats were wholehearted supporters of expansion, whereas many Whigs (especially in the North) were opposed. Whigs welcomed most of the changes wrought by industrialization but advocated strong government policies that would guide growth and development within the country's existing boundaries; they feared (correctly) that expansion raised a contentious issue, the extension of slavery to the territories. On the other hand, many Democrats feared industrialization the Whigs welcomed. ... For many Democrats, the answer to the nation's social ills was to continue to follow Thomas Jefferson's vision of establishing agriculture in the new territories in order to counterbalance industrialization.

Manifest destiny did however provide the rhetorical tone for the largest acquisition of U.S. territory. It was used by Democrats in the 1840s to justify the war with Mexico. It was also used to threaten war with Britain, but President Polk negotiated a compromise that divided the Oregon Country half and half. Merk concludes:

From the outset Manifest Destiny—vast in program, in its sense of continentalism—was slight in support. It lacked national, sectional, or party following commensurate with its bigness. The reason was it did not reflect the national spirit. The thesis that it embodied nationalism, found in much historical writing, is backed by little real supporting evidence.

=== Mexican–American War: 1846–1848 ===
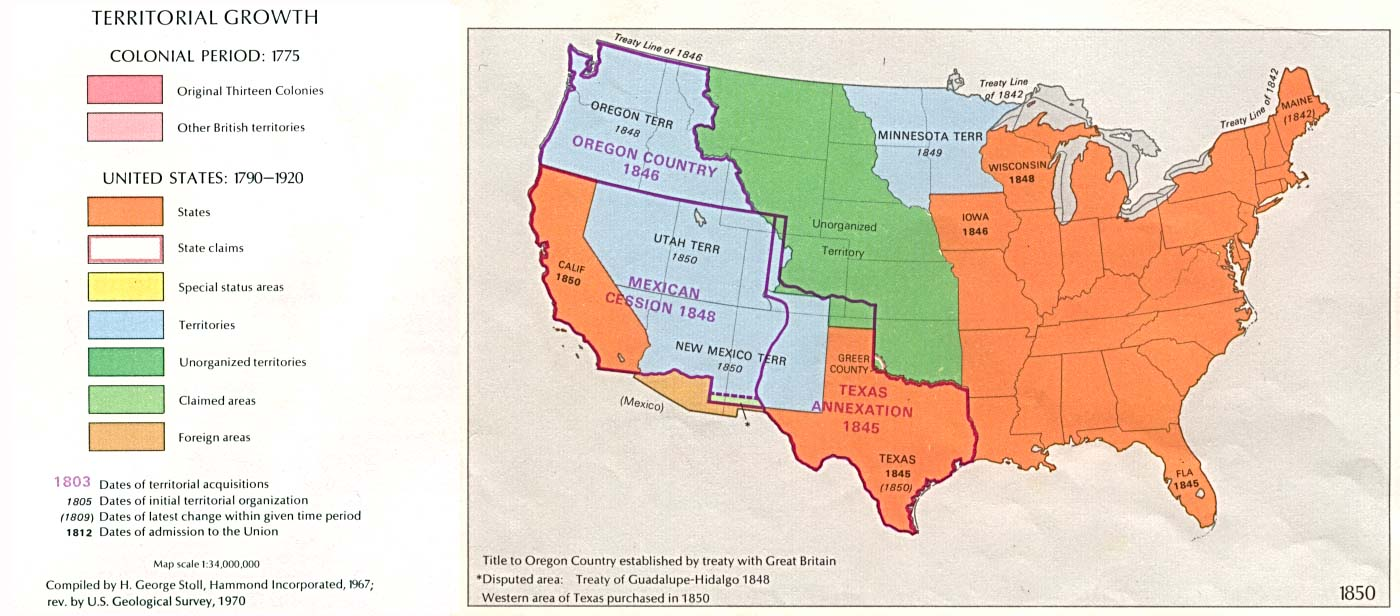
Growth from 1840 to 1850

After a bitter debate in Congress the Republic of Texas was voluntarily annexed in 1845, which Mexico had repeatedly warned meant war. In May 1846, Congress declared war on Mexico after Mexican troops massacred a U.S. Army detachment in a disputed unsettled area. However the homefront was polarized as Whigs opposed and Democrats supported the war. The U.S. Army, augmented by tens of thousands of volunteers, commanded by General Zachary Taylor, defeated Santa Anna's in northern Mexico while other American forces quickly took possession of New Mexico and California. Mexico continued to resist despite a chaotic political situation, and so Polk launched an invasion of the country's heartland. A new American army led by Winfield Scott occupied the port of Veracruz, and pressed inland amid bloody fighting. Santa Anna offered to cede Texas and California north of Monterey Bay, but negotiations broke down and the fighting resumed. In September 1847, Scott's army captured Mexico City. Santa Anna was forced to flee and a provisional government began the task of negotiating peace. The Treaty of Guadalupe Hidalgo was signed on February 2, 1848. It recognized the Rio Grande as the southern boundary of Texas and ceded what is now the states of California, Nevada, Utah, Colorado, Arizona, and New Mexico to the United States, while also paying Mexico $15,000,000 for the territory. In the presidential election of 1848, Zachary Taylor ran as a Whig and won easily when the Democrats split, even though he was an apolitical military man who never voted in his life. Scott became the last Whig candidate for president in 1852, and he lost badly.

With Texas and Florida having been admitted to the union as slave states in 1845, California was entered as a free state in 1850 after its state convention unanimously voted to ban slavery.

Major events in the western movement of the U.S. population were the Homestead Act, a law by which, for a nominal price, a settler was given title to 160 acres (65 ha) of land to farm; the opening of the Oregon Territory to settlement; the Texas Revolution; the opening of the Oregon Trail; the Mormon Emigration to Utah in 1846–47; the California Gold Rush of 1849; the Colorado Gold Rush of 1859; and the completion of the nation's first transcontinental railroad on May 10, 1869.

US Population Distribution

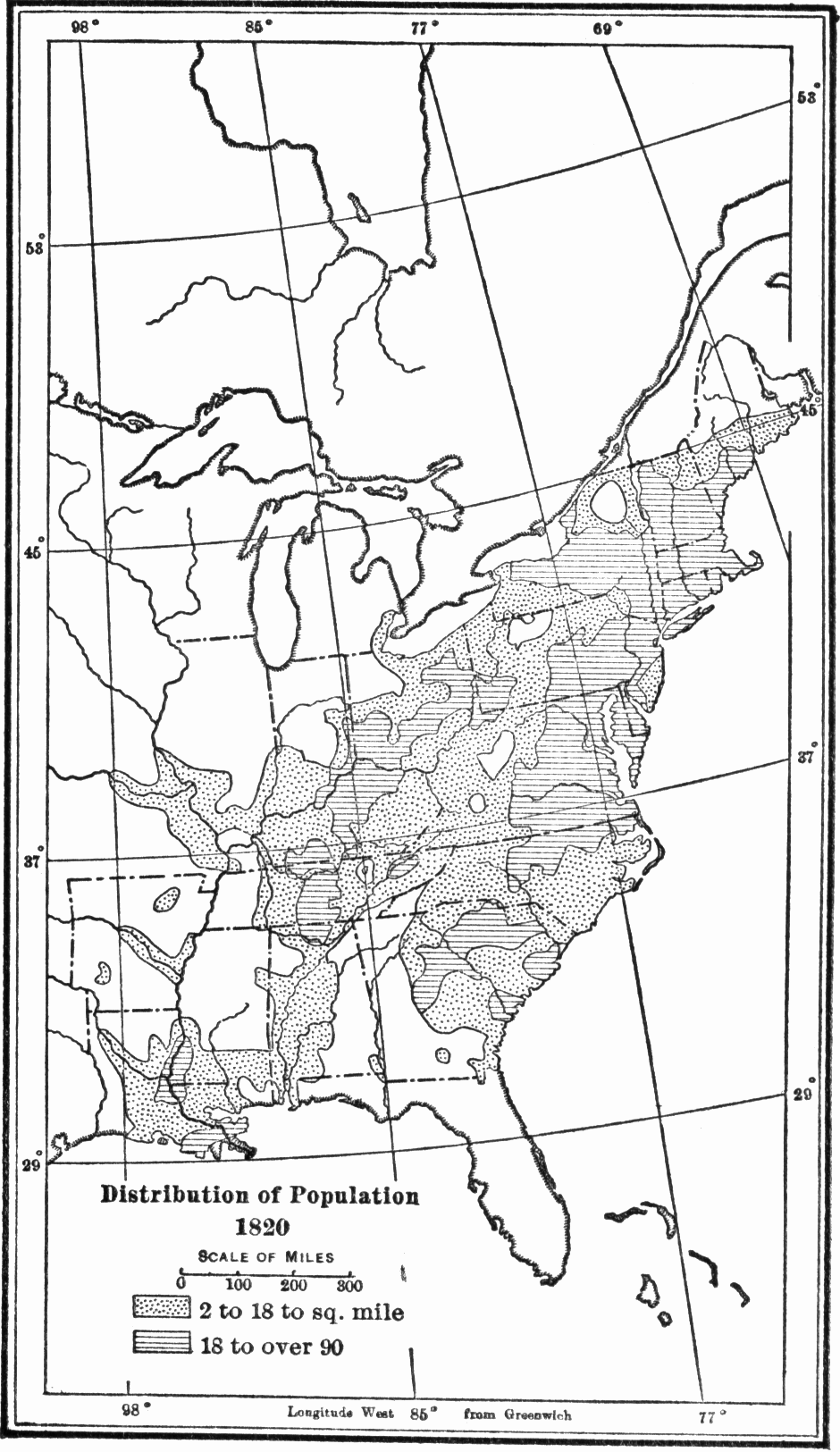
1820

== See also ==
- Timeline of the history of the United States (1790–1819)
- Timeline of the history of the United States (1820–1859)
- History of the United States (1849–1865)
- American gentry
- Second Great Awakening
- Second Party System
- Slavery in the United States
- Presidency of James Madison
- Presidency of James Monroe
- Presidency of John Quincy Adams
- Presidency of Andrew Jackson
- Presidency of Martin Van Buren
- Presidency of John Tyler
- Presidency of James K. Polk
- Presidency of Zachary Taylor

== Sources ==
- Dangerfield, George (1965). The Awakening of American Nationalism: 1815–1828. Harper & Row. ISBN 9780061330612.
- Howe, Daniel Walker (2009). What Hath God Wrought: The Transformation of America, 1815–1848. Oxford History of the United States. ISBN 9780199726578.
- Weyler, Karen A. (2012). "Chapter 11: John Neal and the Early Discourse of American Women's Rights". In Watts, Edward; Carlson, David J. (eds.). John Neal and Nineteenth Century American Literature and Culture. pp. 227–246.
