= History of the United States (1789–1815) =

The United States of America
- 1789–1815
History of the United States (1776–1789)	History of the United States (1815–1849)
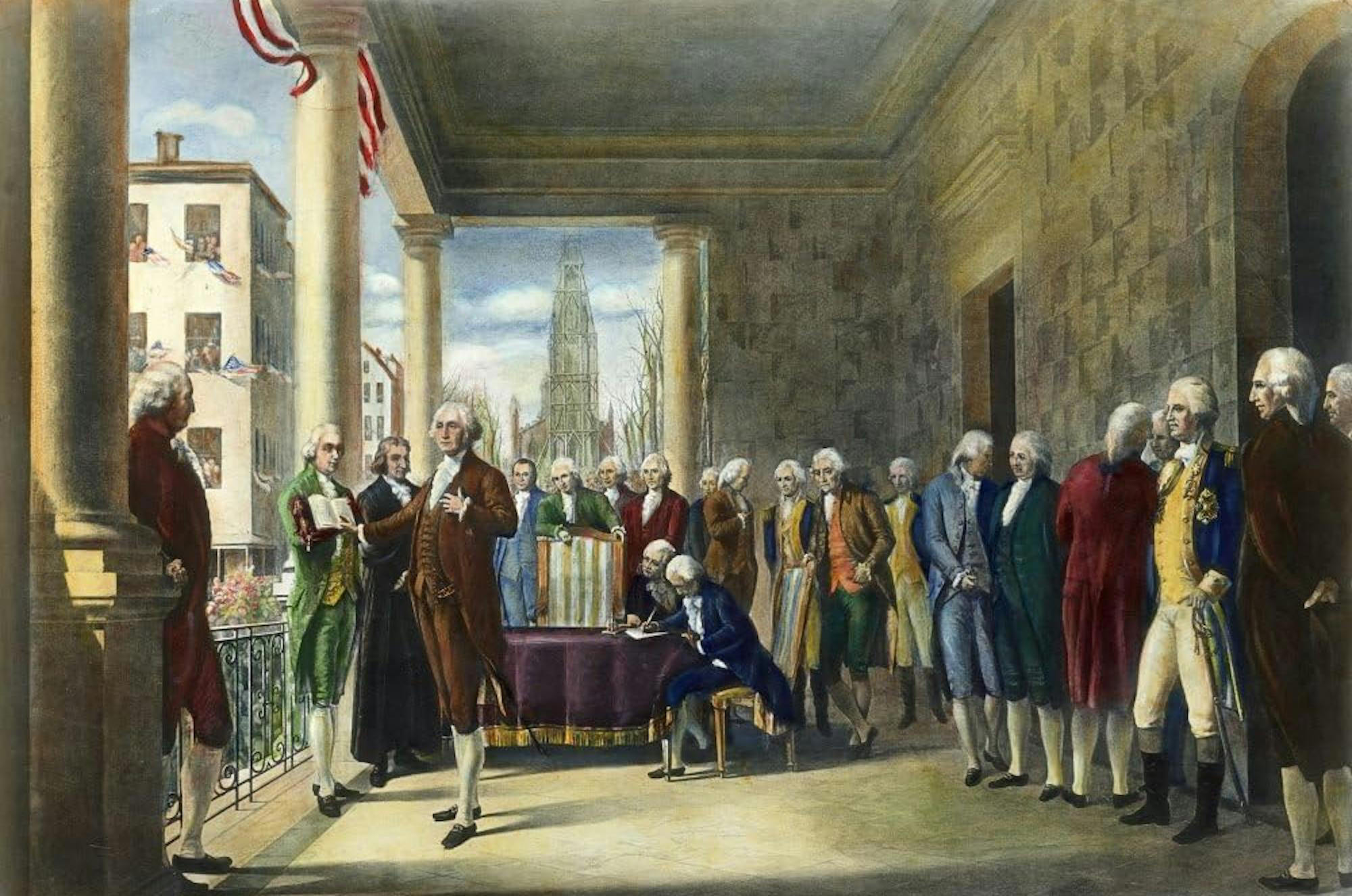
- The first inauguration of George Washington as the first president of the United States
- Location: United States
- Including: Federalist Era; Jeffersonian Era; American frontier
- President(s): George Washington; John Adams; Thomas Jefferson; James Madison
- Key events: Ratification of the Constitution; Whiskey Rebellion; Quasi-War; Louisiana Purchase; War of 1812

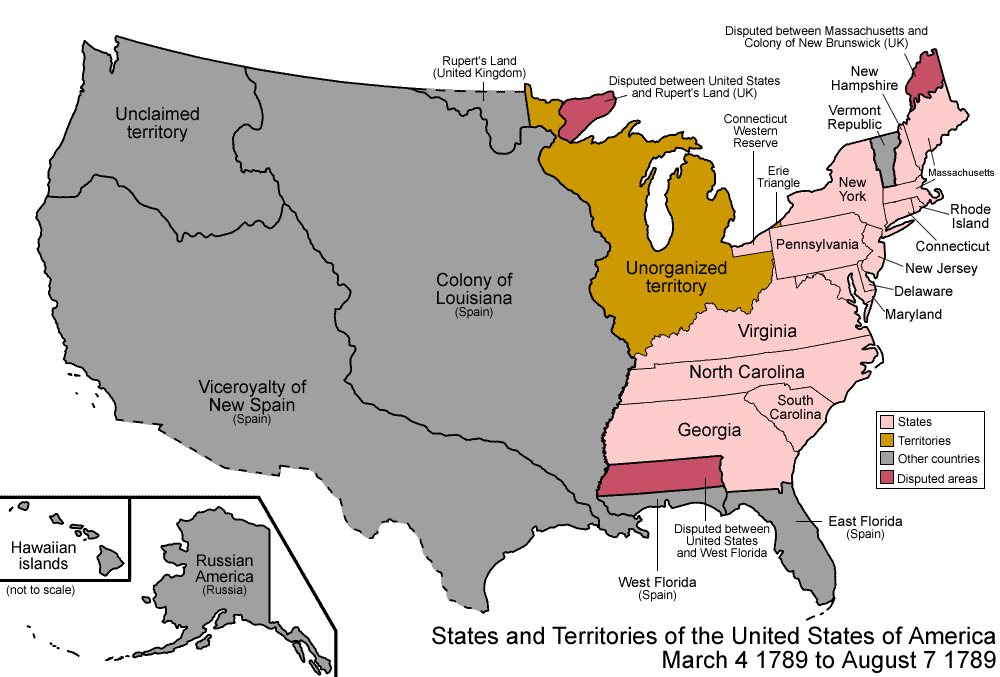

The history of the United States from 1789 to 1815 was marked by the nascent years of the American Republic under the new U.S. Constitution. George Washington was elected the first president in 1789. On his own initiative, Washington created three departments, State (led by Thomas Jefferson), Treasury (led by Alexander Hamilton), and War (led at first by Henry Knox). The secretaries, along with a new Attorney General, became the cabinet.

Based in New York City, the new government acted quickly to rebuild the nation's financial structure. Enacting Hamilton's program, the government assumed the Revolutionary War debts of the states and the national government, and refinanced them with new federal bonds. It paid for the program through new tariffs and taxes; the tax on whiskey led to a revolt in the west; Washington raised an army and suppressed it with minimal violence. The nation adopted a Bill of Rights as 10 amendments to the new constitution. Fleshing out the Constitution's specification of the judiciary as capped by a Supreme Court, the Judiciary Act of 1789 established the entire federal judiciary. The Supreme Court became important under the leadership of Chief Justice John Marshall (1801–1835), a federalist and nationalist who built a strong Supreme Court and strengthened the national government.

The 1790s were highly contentious. The First Party System emerged in the contest between Hamilton and his Federalist party, and Thomas Jefferson and his Republican party. Washington and Hamilton were building a strong national government, with a broad financial base, and the support of merchants and financiers throughout the country. Jeffersonians opposed the new national Bank, the Navy, and federal taxes. The Federalists favored Britain, which was embattled in a series of wars with France. Jefferson's victory in 1800 opened the era of Jeffersonian democracy, and doomed the upper-crust Federalists to increasingly marginal roles. The Louisiana Purchase from Napoleon in 1803 opened vast Western expanses of fertile land, which exactly met the needs of the rapidly expanding population of yeomen farmers whom Jefferson championed.

Madison's administration declared war on Britain in 1812, sparking the War of 1812. The Americans declared war due to a variety of reasons, including disputes with Britain over impressment and British support for Tecumseh's confederacy, which was then embroiled in a war with the United States over American settlement in the Northwest Territory. A major American war aim was the invasion of Canada; Secretary of State James Monroe said in June 1812, "It might be necessary to invade Canada, not as an object of the war but to bring it to a satisfactory conclusion." The first few years of the war saw the Americans launch several failed invasions of Canada, while blockades by the Royal Navy devastated the American economy. However, the Americans saw more military successes in 1813, while three British invasions of the US in 1814 ended in failure; the war also saw the death of Tecumseh and the defeat of his confederacy. The Federalists, who had opposed the war to the point of threatening secession, were viewed as traitors after the War of 1812 ended in 1815 with the Treaty of Ghent. The remaining Indians east of the Mississippi River were kept on reservations or moved via the Trail of Tears to reservations in what later became Oklahoma.

== Federalist Era ==
=== Washington administration: 1789–1797 ===
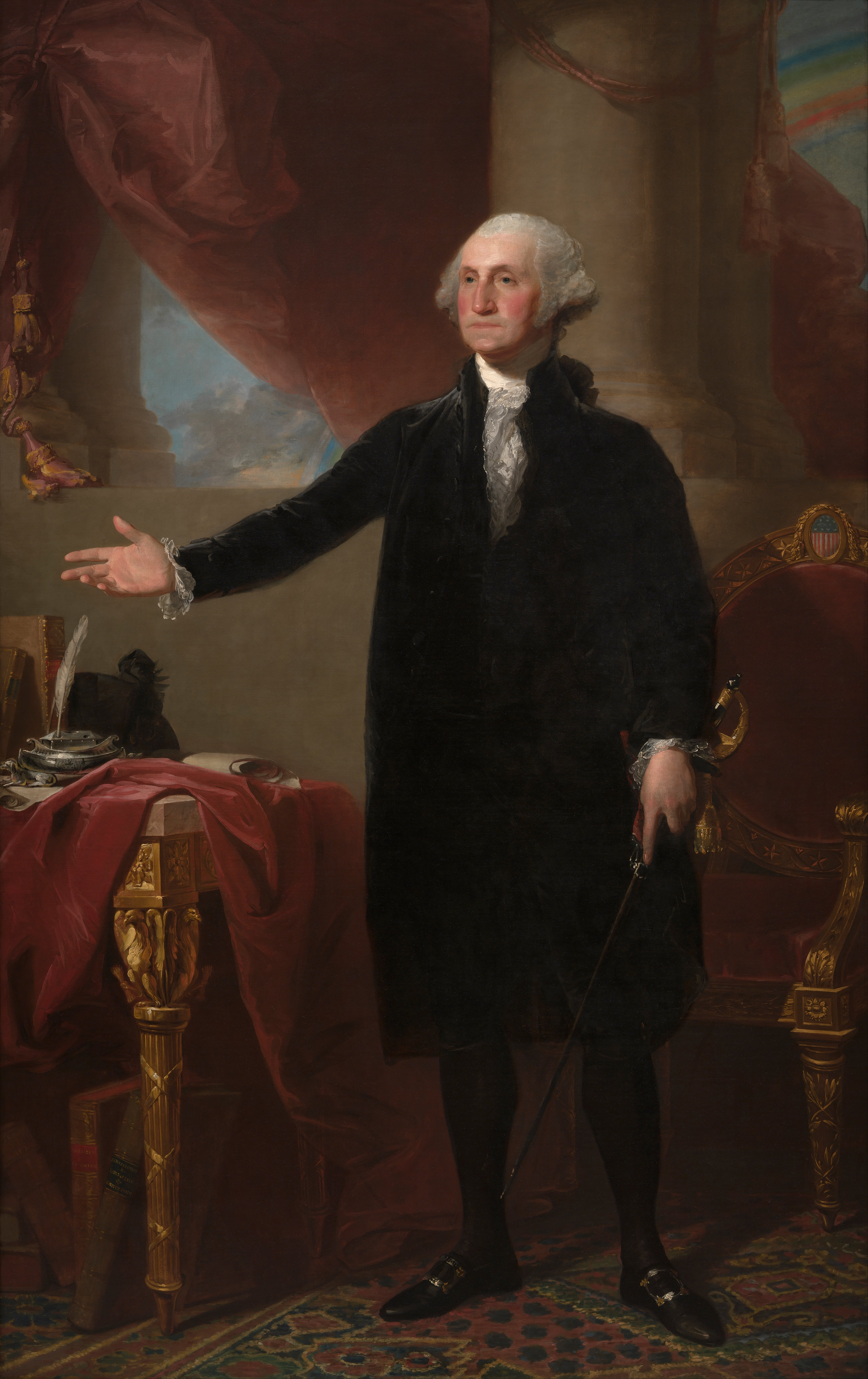
George Washington, the first U.S. president, depicted in the 1796 Lansdowne Portrait by Gilbert Stuart

George Washington, a renowned hero of the American Revolution, commander of the Continental Army, and president of the Constitutional Convention, was unanimously chosen as the first president of the United States under the new U.S. Constitution. All the leaders of the new nation were committed to republicanism, and the doubts of the Anti-Federalists of 1788 were allayed with the passage of a Bill of Rights as the first ten amendments to the Constitution in 1791.

The first census enumerated a population of 3.9 million. Only 12 cities had populations of more than 5,000; most people were farmers.

The Constitution assigned Congress the task of creating inferior courts. The Judiciary Act of 1789 established the entire federal judiciary. The act provided for the Supreme Court to have six justices, and for two additional levels: three circuit courts and 13 district courts. It also created the offices of U.S. Marshal, Deputy Marshal, and District Attorney in each federal judicial district. The Compromise of 1790 located the national capital in a district to be defined in the South (the District of Columbia), and enabled the federal assumption of state debts.

The key role of Secretary of the Treasury was awarded to Washington's wartime aide-de-camp, Alexander Hamilton. With Washington's support and against Thomas Jefferson's opposition, Hamilton convinced Congress to pass a far-reaching financial program that was patterned after the system developed in England a century earlier. It funded the debts of the Revolutionary War, set up a national bank, and set up a system of tariffs and taxes. His policies linked the economic interests of the states, and of wealthy Americans, to the success of the national government, and enhanced the international financial standing of the new nation.

Most Representatives of the South opposed Hamilton's plan because they had already repudiated their debts and thus gained little from it. There were early signs of the economic and cultural rift between the Northern and Southern states that was to burst into flames seven decades later: the South and its plantation-based economy resisted a centralized federal government and subordination to Northeastern business interests. Despite considerable opposition in Congress from Southerners, Hamilton's plan was moved into effect during the middle of 1790. The First Bank of the United States was thus created that year despite arguments from Thomas Jefferson and his supporters that it was unconstitutional while Hamilton declared that it was entirely within the powers granted to the federal government. Hamilton's other proposals, including protection tariffs for nascent American industry, were defeated.

The Whiskey Rebellion broke out in 1794 when settlers in the Monongahela Valley of western Pennsylvania protested against the new federal tax on whiskey, which the settlers shipped across the mountains to earn money. It was the first serious test of the federal government. Washington ordered federal marshals to serve court orders requiring the tax protesters to appear in federal district court. By August 1794, the protests became dangerously close to outright rebellion, and on August 7, several thousand armed settlers gathered near Pittsburgh, Pennsylvania. Washington then invoked the Militia Law of 1792 to summon the militias of several states. A force of 13,000 men was organized, and Washington led it to Western Pennsylvania. The revolt immediately collapsed without violence.

Foreign policy unexpectedly took center stage starting in 1793, when revolutionary France became engulfed in war with the rest of Europe, an event that was to lead to 22 years of fighting. France claimed that its 1778 alliance with the U.S. meant that the U.S. was bound to come to their aid. The Washington administration's policy of neutrality was widely supported, but the Jeffersonians strongly favored France and deeply distrusted the British, who they saw as enemies of republicanism. In addition, they sought to annex Spanish territory in the South and West. Meanwhile, Hamilton and the business community favored Britain, which was by far America's largest trading partner. The Republicans gained support in the winter of 1793–94 as the Royal Navy impressed alleged deserters serving on American merchantmen, but Anglo-American tensions were resolved with the Jay Treaty of 1794, which opened up 10 years of prosperous trade in exchange for which Britain would hand over eight forts in what was technically American soil. The Jeffersonians viewed the Treaty as a surrender to British interests, and mobilized their supporters nationwide to defeat the treaty. The Federalists likewise rallied supporters in a vicious conflict, which continued until 1795 when Washington publicly intervened in the debate, using his prestige to secure ratification. By this point, the economic and political advantages of the Federalist position had become clear to all concerned, combined with growing disdain for France after the Reign of Terror and Jacobin anti-religious policies. Jefferson promptly resigned as Secretary of State. Historian George Herring notes the "remarkable and fortuitous economic and diplomatic gains" produced by the Jay Treaty.

Continuing conflict between Hamilton and Jefferson, especially over foreign policy, led to the formation of the Federalist and Republican parties. Although Washington warned against political parties in his farewell address, he generally supported Hamilton and Hamiltonian programs over those of Jefferson. The Democratic-Republican Party dominated the Upper South, Western frontier, and parts of the middle states. Federalist support was concentrated in the major Northern cities and South Carolina. After Washington's death in 1799, he became a symbolic hero of the Federalists.

=== Emergence of political parties ===
The First Party System between 1792 and 1824 featured two national parties competing for control of the presidency, Congress, and the states: The Federalist Party, which was created by Alexander Hamilton and was dominant to 1800; and the rival Republican Party (Democratic-Republican Party), which was created by Thomas Jefferson and James Madison, and was dominant after 1800. Both parties originated in national politics but moved to organize supporters and voters in every state. These comprised "probably the first modern party system in the world" because they were based on voters, not factions of aristocrats at court or parliament. The Federalists appealed to the business community, the Republicans to the planters and farmers. By 1796, politics in every state was nearly monopolized by the two parties.

Jefferson wrote on February 12, 1798:

Two political Sects have arisen within the U. S. the one believing that the executive is the branch of our government which the most needs support; the other that like the analogous branch in the English Government, it is already too strong for the republican parts of the Constitution; and therefore in equivocal cases they incline to the legislative powers: the former of these are called federalists, sometimes aristocrats or monocrats, and sometimes tories, after the corresponding sect in the English Government of exactly the same definition: the latter are stiled republicans, whigs, jacobins, anarchists, disorganizers, etc. these terms are in familiar use with most persons.

The Federalists promoted the financial system of Treasury Secretary Hamilton, which emphasized federal assumption of state debts, a tariff to pay off those debts, a national bank to facilitate financing, and encouragement of banking and manufacturing. The Republicans, based in the plantation South, opposed a strong executive power, were hostile to a standing army and navy, demanded a limited reading of the Constitutional powers of the federal government, and strongly opposed the Hamilton financial program. Perhaps even more important was foreign policy, where the Federalists favored Britain because of its political stability and its close ties to American trade, while the Republicans admired the French and the French Revolution. Jefferson was especially fearful that British influence would undermine republicanism in the United States. Britain and France were at war 1793–1815, with one brief interruption. American policy was neutrality, with the federalists hostile to France, and the Republicans hostile to Britain. The Jay Treaty of 1794 marked the decisive mobilization of the two parties and their supporters in every state. President Washington, while officially nonpartisan, generally supported the Federalists and that party made Washington their iconic hero.

=== Adams administration: 1797–1801 ===
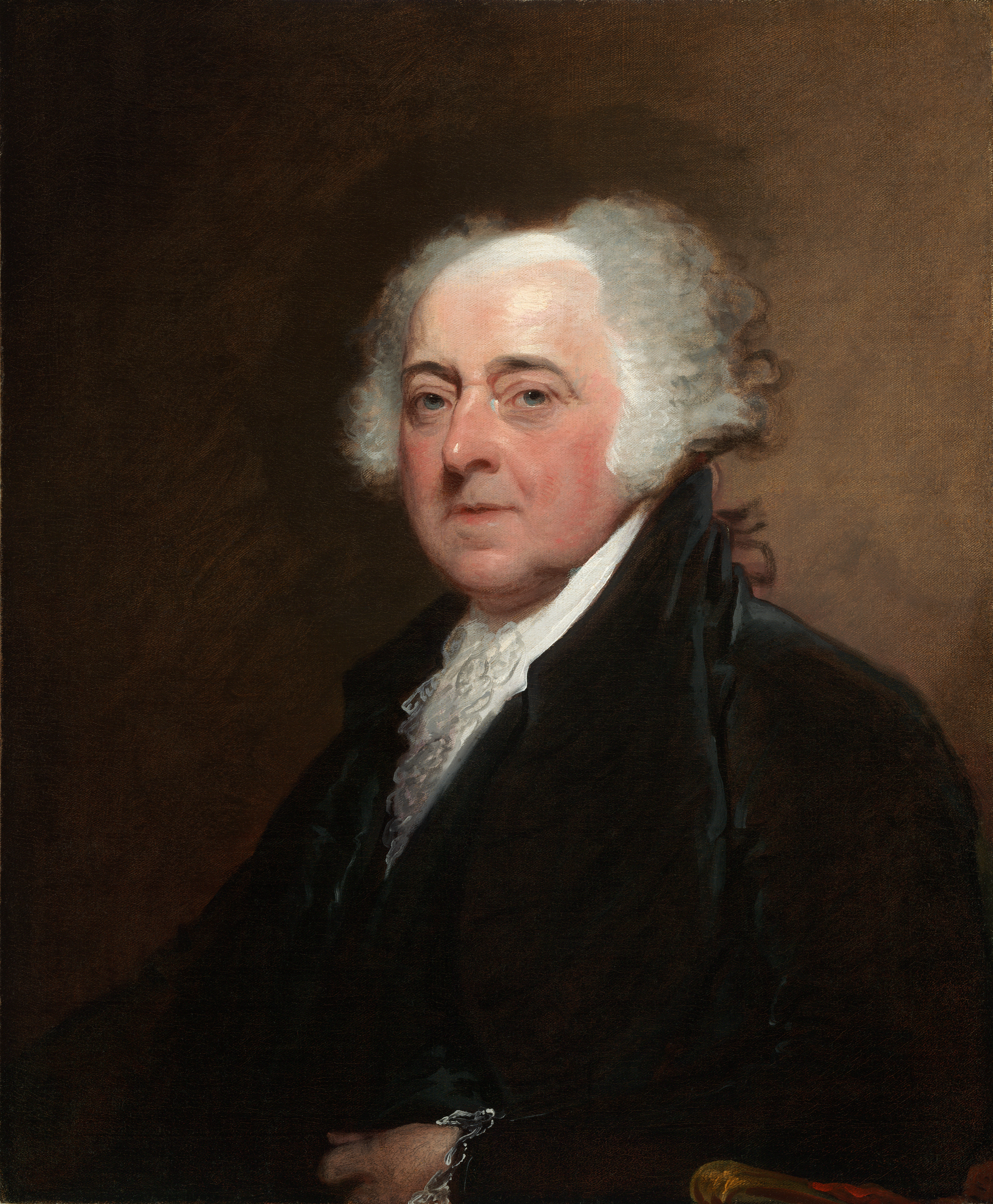
John Adams, Second U.S. president

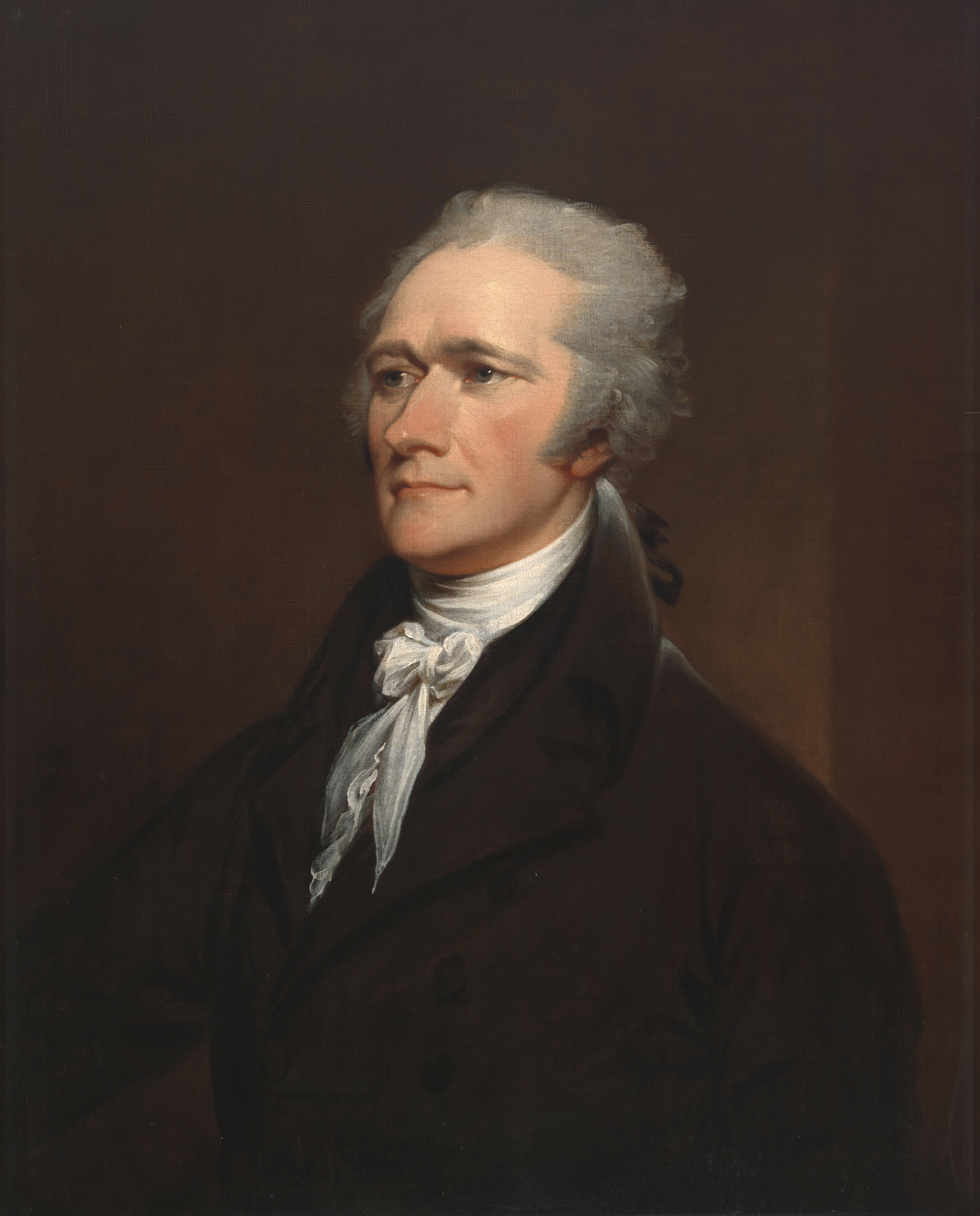
Alexander Hamilton, First U.S. Secretary of the Treasury

Washington retired in 1797, firmly declining to serve for more than eight years as the nation's head. The Federalists campaigned for Vice President John Adams to be elected president. Adams defeated Jefferson in the 1796 presidential election, who as the runner-up became vice president under the operation of the Electoral College of that time.

Even before he entered the presidency, Adams had quarreled with Alexander Hamilton, a conflict that was hindered by a divided Federalist party.

These domestic difficulties were compounded by international complications: France, angered by American approval in 1795 of the Jay Treaty with its great enemy Britain proclaimed that food and war material bound for British ports were subject to seizure by the French navy. By 1797, France had seized 300 American ships and had broken off diplomatic relations with the United States. When Adams sent three other commissioners to Paris to negotiate, agents of Foreign Minister Charles Maurice de Talleyrand (whom Adams labeled "X, Y and Z" in his report to Congress) informed the Americans that negotiations could only begin if the United States loaned France $12 million and bribed officials of the French government. American hostility to France rose to an excited pitch, fanned by French ambassador Edmond-Charles Genêt. Federalists used the "XYZ Affair" to create a new American army, strengthen the fledgling United States Navy, impose the Alien and Sedition Acts to stop pro-French activities (which had severe repercussions for American civil liberties), and enact new taxes to pay for it. The Naturalization Act, which changed the residency requirement for citizenship from five to 14 years, was targeted at Irish and French immigrants suspected of supporting the Republican Party. The Sedition Act proscribed writing, speaking or publishing anything of "a false, scandalous and malicious" nature against the president or Congress. The few convictions won under the Sedition Act only created martyrs to the cause of civil liberties and aroused support for the Republicans. Jefferson and his allies launched a counterattack, with two states stating in the Kentucky and Virginia Resolutions that state legislatures could nullify acts of Congress. However, all the other states rejected this proposition, and nullification—or as it was called, the "principle of 98"—became the preserve of a faction of the Republicans called the Quids.

In 1799, after a series of naval battles with the French (known as the "Quasi-War"), full-scale war seemed inevitable. In this crisis, Adams broke with his party and sent three new commissioners to France. Napoleon, who had just come to power, received them cordially, and the danger of conflict subsided with the negotiation of the Convention of 1800, which formally released the United States from its 1778 wartime alliance with France. However, reflecting American weakness, France refused to pay $20 million for American ships seized by the French navy.

In his final hours in office, Adams appointed John Marshall as chief justice. Serving until his death in 1835, Marshall dramatically expanded the powers of the Supreme Court and provided a Federalist interpretation of the Constitution that made for a strong national government.

== Jeffersonian Era ==
Thomas Jefferson, the third U.S. president

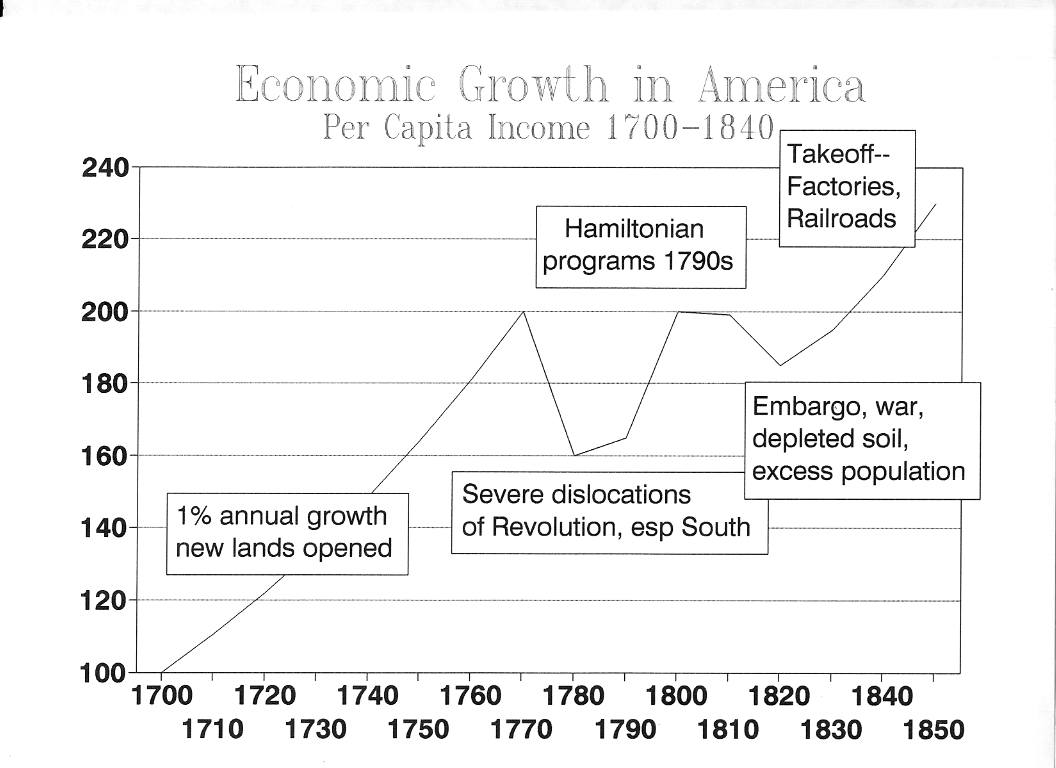

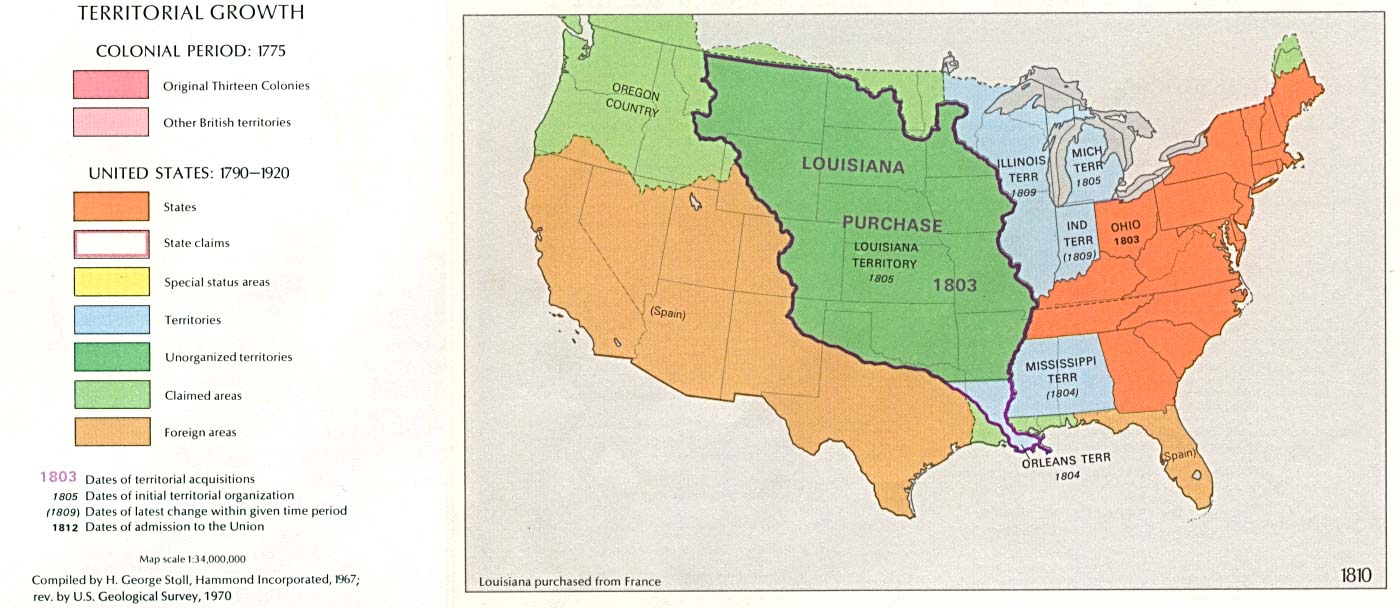
Territorial growth in the U.S. between 1800 and 1810

Thomas Jefferson is a central figure in early American history, highly praised for his political leadership but also criticized for the role of slavery in his private life. He championed equality, democracy and republicanism, attacking aristocratic and monarchistic tendencies. He led and inspired the American Revolution, advocated freedom of religion and tolerance, and opposed the centralizing tendencies of the urban financial elite. Jefferson formed the second national political party and led it to dominance in 1800, then worked for western expansion and exploration. Critics decry the contradiction between his ownership of hundreds of slaves and his famous declaration that "all men are created equal", and argue that he fathered children with his slave mistress.

Under Washington and Adams, the Federalists had established a strong government, but sometimes it followed policies that alienated the citizenry. In 1798, in order to pay for the rapidly expanding army and navy, the Federalists had enacted a new tax on houses, land and slaves, affecting every property owner in the country. In the Fries's Rebellion hundreds of farmers in Pennsylvania revolted—Federalists saw a breakdown in civil society. Some tax resisters were arrested—then pardoned by Adams. Republicans denounced this action as an example of Federalist tyranny.

Jefferson had steadily gathered behind him a great mass of small farmers, shopkeepers and other workers which asserted themselves as Democratic-Republicans in the election of 1800. Jefferson enjoyed extraordinary favor because of his appeal to American idealism. Jefferson's first inaugural address on March 4, 1801, was the first such speech in the new capital of Washington, D.C. In it, Jefferson promised "a wise and frugal government" to preserve order among the inhabitants but would "leave them otherwise free to regulate their own pursuits of industry, and improvement".

Jefferson encouraged agriculture and westward expansion, most notably by the Louisiana Purchase and subsequent Lewis and Clark Expedition. Believing America to be a haven for the oppressed, Jefferson reduced the residency requirement for naturalization to five years.

By the end of his second term, Jefferson and Treasury Secretary Albert Gallatin had managed to reduce the national debt to less than $56 million by reducing the number of executive department employees and Army and Navy officers and enlisted men, and otherwise curtailing government and military spending.

Jefferson's domestic policy was uneventful and hands-off; the Jefferson administration concerned itself predominantly with foreign affairs and territorial expansion. Except for Gallatin's reforms, their main preoccupation was purging the government of Federalist judges. Jefferson and his associates were widely distrustful of the judicial branch, especially because Adams had made several "midnight" appointments before leaving office in March 1801. In Marbury vs Madison (1803), the Supreme Court under John Marshall established the precedent of reviewing and overturning legislation passed by Congress. This ruling by leading Federalists upset Jefferson to the point where his administration began opening impeachment hearings against judges perceived as abusing their power. The attempted purge of the judicial branch reached its climax with the trial of Supreme Court Justice Samuel Chase. When Chase was acquitted by the Senate, Jefferson abandoned his campaign.

With the upcoming expiration in 1807 of the 20-year ban on Congressional action on the subject, Jefferson, a lifelong opponent of the slave trade, successfully called on Congress to criminalize the international slave trade, calling it "violations of human rights which have been so long continued on the unoffending inhabitants of Africa, and which the morality, the reputation, and the best interests of our country have long been eager to proscribe."

=== Jeffersonian principles of foreign policy ===
The Jeffersonians had a distinct foreign policy:

- Americans had a duty to spread what Jefferson called the "Empire of Liberty" to the world, but should avoid "entangling alliances".
- Britain was the greatest threat, especially its monarchy, aristocracy, corruption, and business methods—the Jay Treaty of 1794 was much too favorable to Britain and thus threatened American values.
- Regarding the French Revolution, its devotion to principles of Republicanism, liberty, equality, and fraternity made France the ideal European nation. "Jefferson's support of the French Revolution often serves in his mind as a defense of republicanism against the monarchism of the Anglophiles". On the other hand, Napoleon was the antithesis of republicanism and could not be supported.
- Navigation rights on the Mississippi River were critical to American national interests. Control by Spain was tolerable—control by France was unacceptable. The Louisiana Purchase was an unexpected opportunity to guarantee those rights which the Jeffersonians immediately seized upon.
- Most Jeffersonians argued an expensive high seas Navy was unnecessary, since cheap locally based gunboats, floating batteries, mobile shore batteries, and coastal fortifications could defend the ports without the temptation to engage in distant wars. Jefferson himself, however, wanted a few frigates to protect American shipping against Barbary pirates in the Mediterranean.
  - To protect its shipping interests from pirates in the Mediterranean, Jefferson and Madison fought the First Barbary War in 1801–1805 and the Second Barbary War in 1815.
- A standing army is dangerous to liberty and should be avoided. Instead of threatening warfare, Jeffersonians relied on economic coercion such as the embargo. See Embargo Act of 1807.
- The locally controlled non-professional militia was adequate to defend the nation from invasion. After the militia proved inadequate in the first year of the War of 1812 President Madison expanded the national Army for the duration.

=== Louisiana Purchase ===
The Louisiana Purchase in 1803 gave Western farmers use of the important Mississippi River waterway, removed the French presence from the western border of the United States, and, most important, provided U.S. settlers with vast potential for expansion. A few weeks afterward, war resumed between Britain and Napoleon's France. The United States, dependent on European revenues from the export of agricultural goods, tried to export food and raw materials to both nations and to profit from transporting goods between their home markets and Caribbean colonies. Both sides permitted this trade when it benefited them but opposed it when it did not. Following the 1805 destruction of a French fleet at the Battle of Trafalgar, Britain sought to cut off French overseas trade ties. Thus, in retaliation against U.S. trade practices, Britain issued the Orders in Council, which further restricted American trade with France and its allies. Believing that Britain could not rely on other sources of food than the United States, Congress and President Jefferson suspended all U.S. trade with foreign nations in the Embargo Act of 1807, hoping to get the British to suspend the Orders in Council. The Embargo Act, however, devastated American agricultural exports and weakened American ports while Britain found other sources of food.

=== War of 1812 ===
James Madison won the U.S. presidential election of 1808, largely on the strength of his abilities in foreign affairs at a time when Britain and France were both on the brink of war with the United States. He was quick to repeal the Embargo Act, refreshing American seaports. Despite his intellectual brilliance, Madison lacked Jefferson's leadership and tried to merely copy his predecessor's policies verbatim. He tried various trade restrictions to try to force Britain and France to end their interference with American shipping, but they were unsuccessful. The Royal Navy enjoyed undisputed mastery over the sea, but needed large numbers of sailors, and was deeply angered at the American merchant fleet for being a haven for British deserters. At the same time, the size of the U.S. Navy was reduced due to ideological opposition to a large standing military and the Federal government became considerably weakened when the charter of the First National Bank expired and Congress declined to renew it. A clamor for military action thus erupted just as relations with Britain and France were at a low point and the U.S.'s ability to wage war had been reduced.

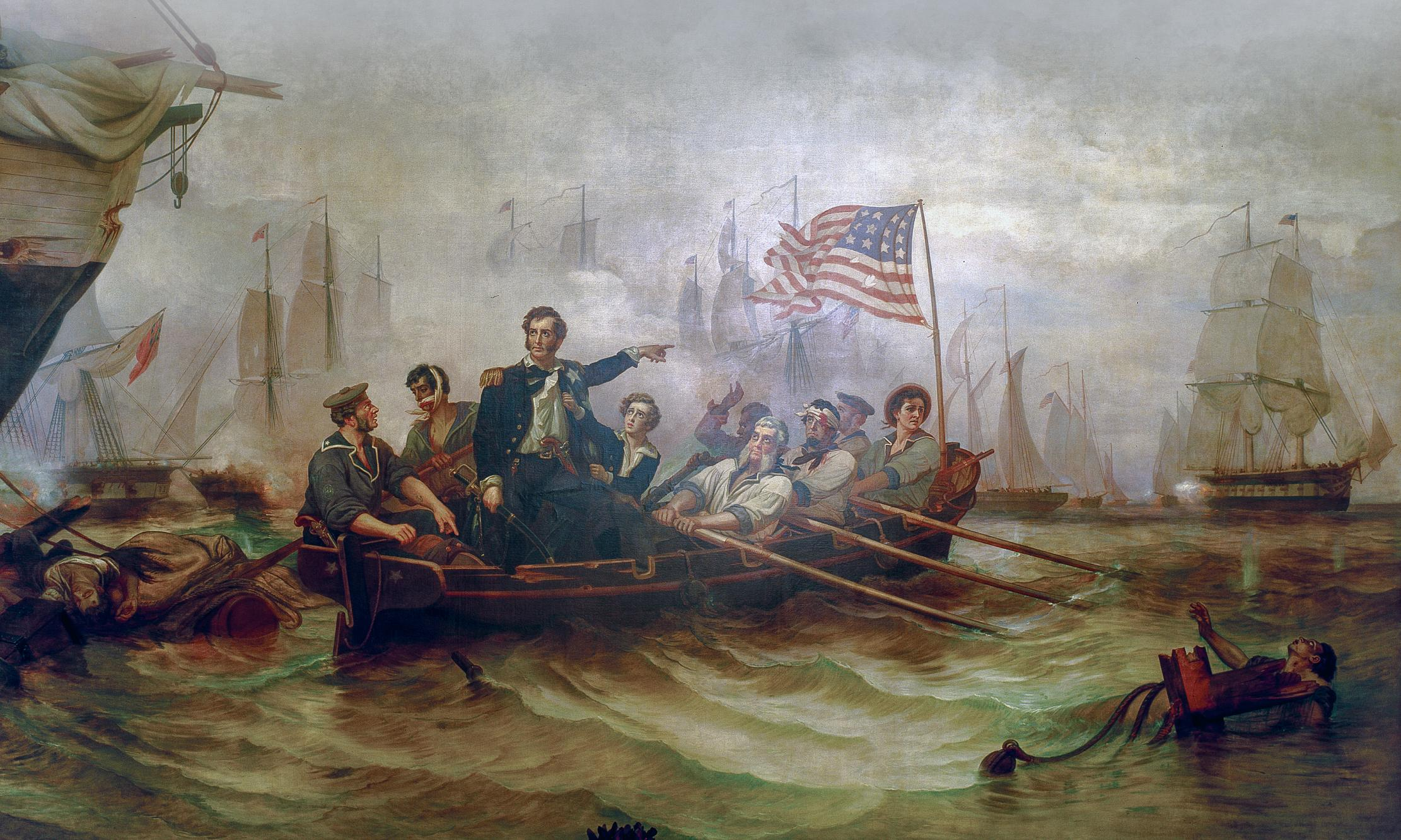
Battle of Lake Erie; American victory in 1813 meant control of Lake Erie for the rest of the war; painting by William H. Powell (1865)

Citing continued British interference with American merchant shipping and aid to American Indians in the Old Northwest, the Twelfth Congress—led by Southern and Western Jeffersonians—declared war on Britain in 1812. Westerners and Southerners were the most ardent supporters of the war, given their concerns about defending national honor and expanding western settlements, and having access to world markets for their agricultural exports. New England was making a fine profit and its Federalists opposed the war, almost to the point of secession. The Federalist reputation collapsed in the triumphalism of 1815 and the party no longer played a national role.

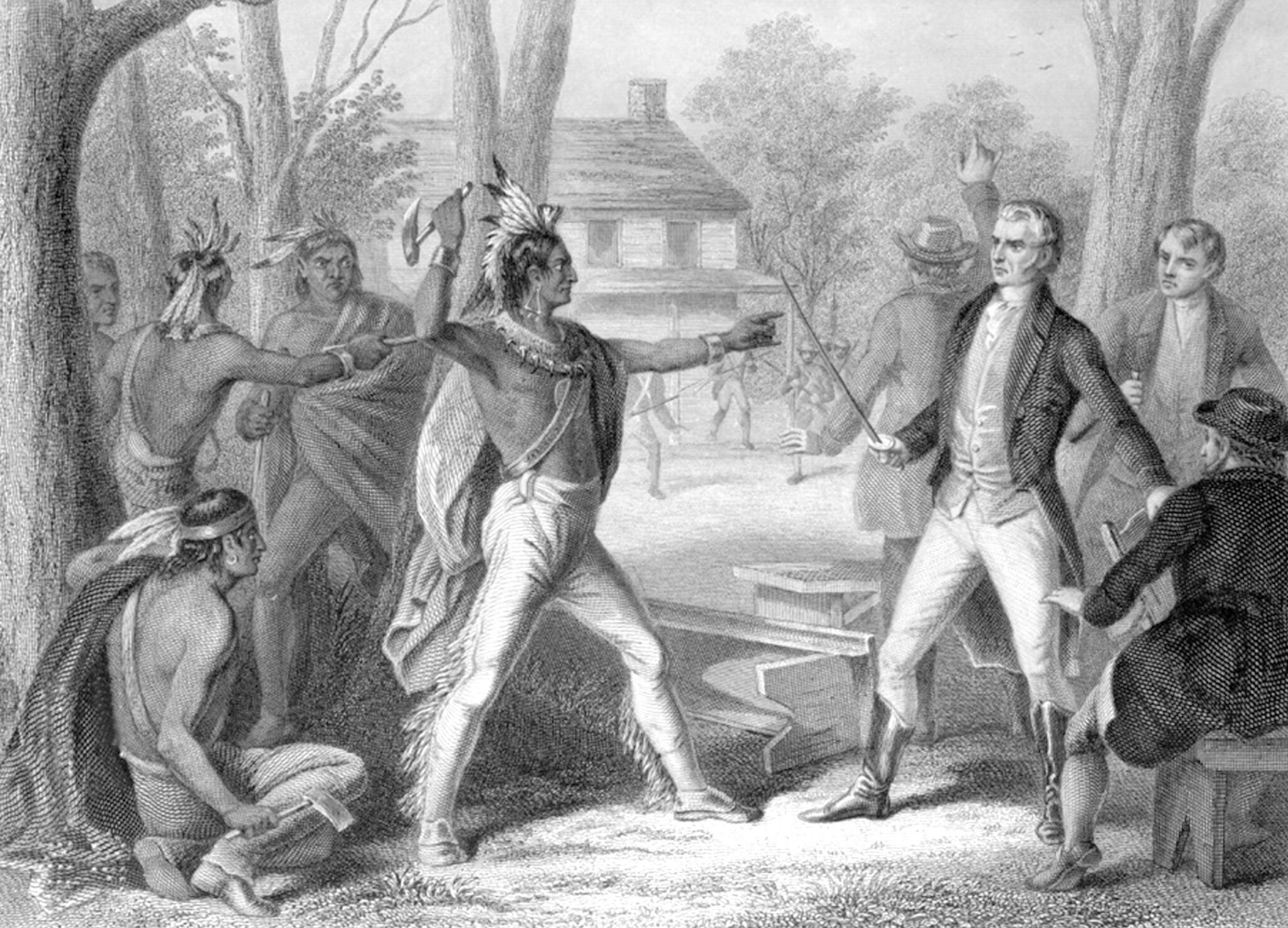
Tecumseh and Governor William Henry Harrison; Tecumseh's death in the Battle of the Thames in 1813 ended British hopes to create a neutral Indian state in the Midwest

The war drew to a close in 1815 after several failed American invasions of Canada and equally unsuccessful British invasions of the United States. The ratification of the Treaty of Ghent in February 1815, formally ended the war, returned to the status quo ante bellum. Britain's alliance with the Native Americans ended, and the Indians were the major losers of the war. News of the American victory at the Battle of New Orleans came at the same time as news of the peace, giving Americans a psychological triumph and opening the Era of Good Feelings. Recovery from the destruction left in the wake of the war began, including rebuilding the Library of Congress collection which had been destroyed in the Burning of Washington. The war destroyed the anti-war Federalist Party and opened the door for generals like Andrew Jackson and William Henry Harrison, and civilian leaders like James Monroe, John Quincy Adams, and Henry Clay, to run for national office.

== Social history ==
=== Second Great Awakening ===
The Second Great Awakening was a Protestant religious revival movement that flourished in 1800–1840 in every region.

=== Women ===
Zagarri (2007) argues the Revolution created an ongoing debate on the rights of women and created an environment favorable to women's participation in politics. She asserts that for a brief decades, a "comprehensive transformation in women's rights, roles, and responsibilities seemed not only possible but perhaps inevitable." However the opening of possibilities also engendered a backlash that actually set back the cause of women's rights and led to a greater rigidity that marginalized women from political life.

Judith Sargent Murray published the early and influential essay On the Equality of the Sexes in 1790, blaming poor standards in female education as the root of women's problems. However, scandals surrounding the personal lives of English contemporaries Catharine Macaulay and Mary Wollstonecraft pushed feminist authorship into private correspondence from the 1790s through the early decades of the nineteenth century.

US Population Distribution

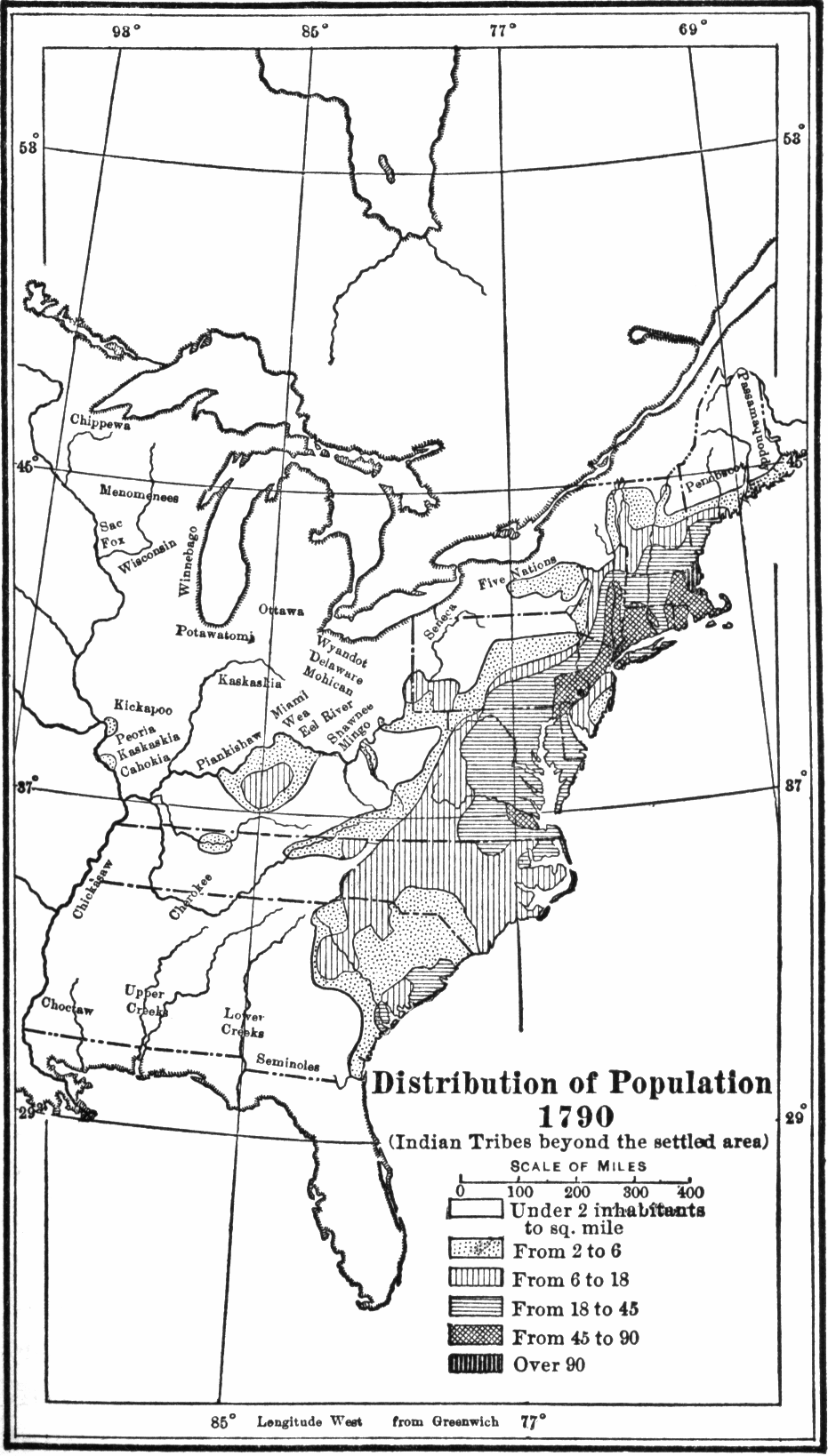
1790

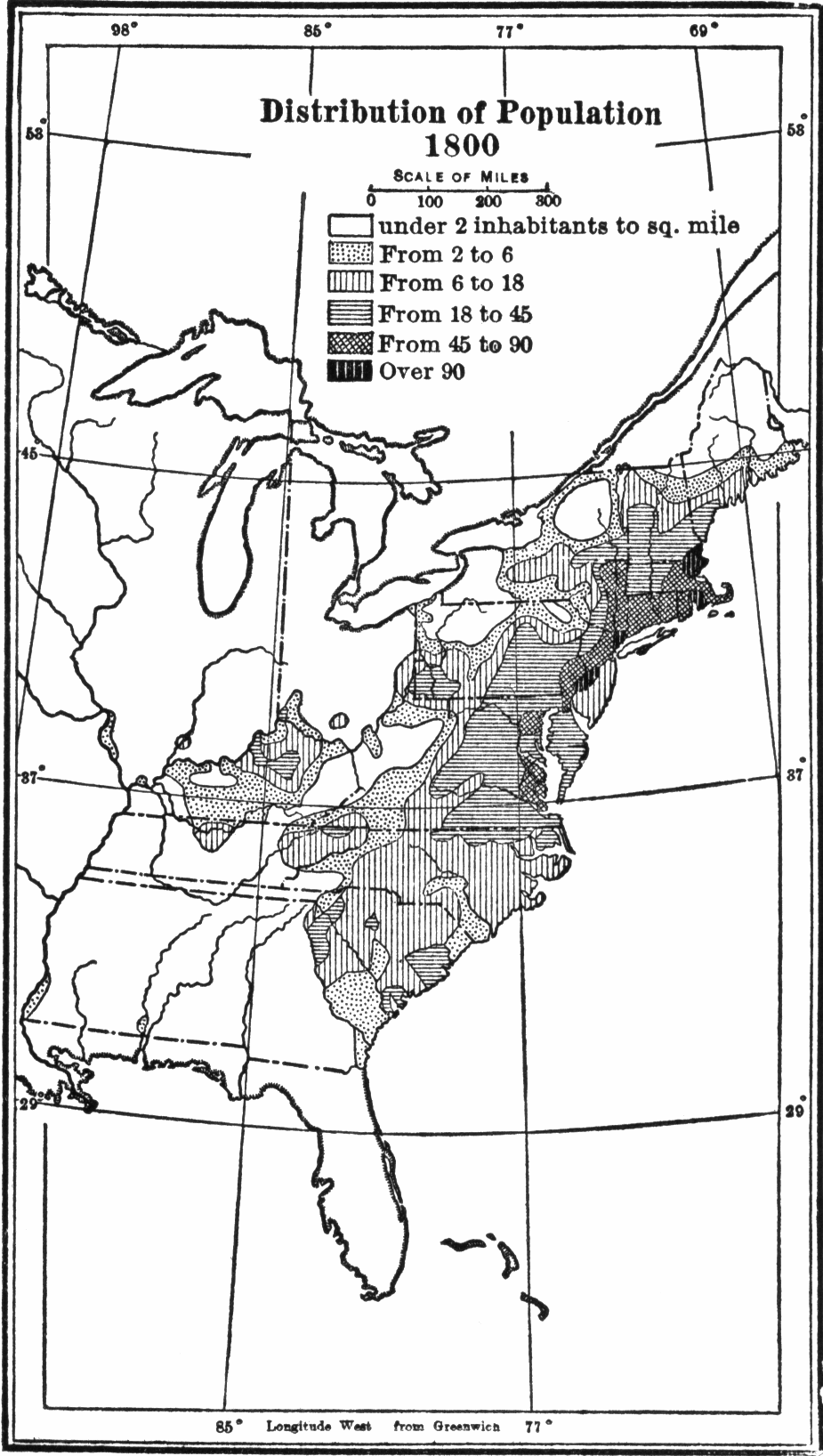
1800

== See also ==
- Timeline of the history of the United States (1790–1819)
- History of the United States (1815–1849)
- First Party System
- American gentry
- Slavery in the United States
- Presidency of George Washington
- Presidency of John Adams
- Presidency of Thomas Jefferson
- Presidency of James Madison
