= 1940 in the United States =

- Decades: 1920s; 1930s; 1940s; 1950s; 1960s
- See also: History of the United States (1918–1945); Timeline of United States history (1930–1949); List of years in the United States

Events from the year 1940 in the United States.

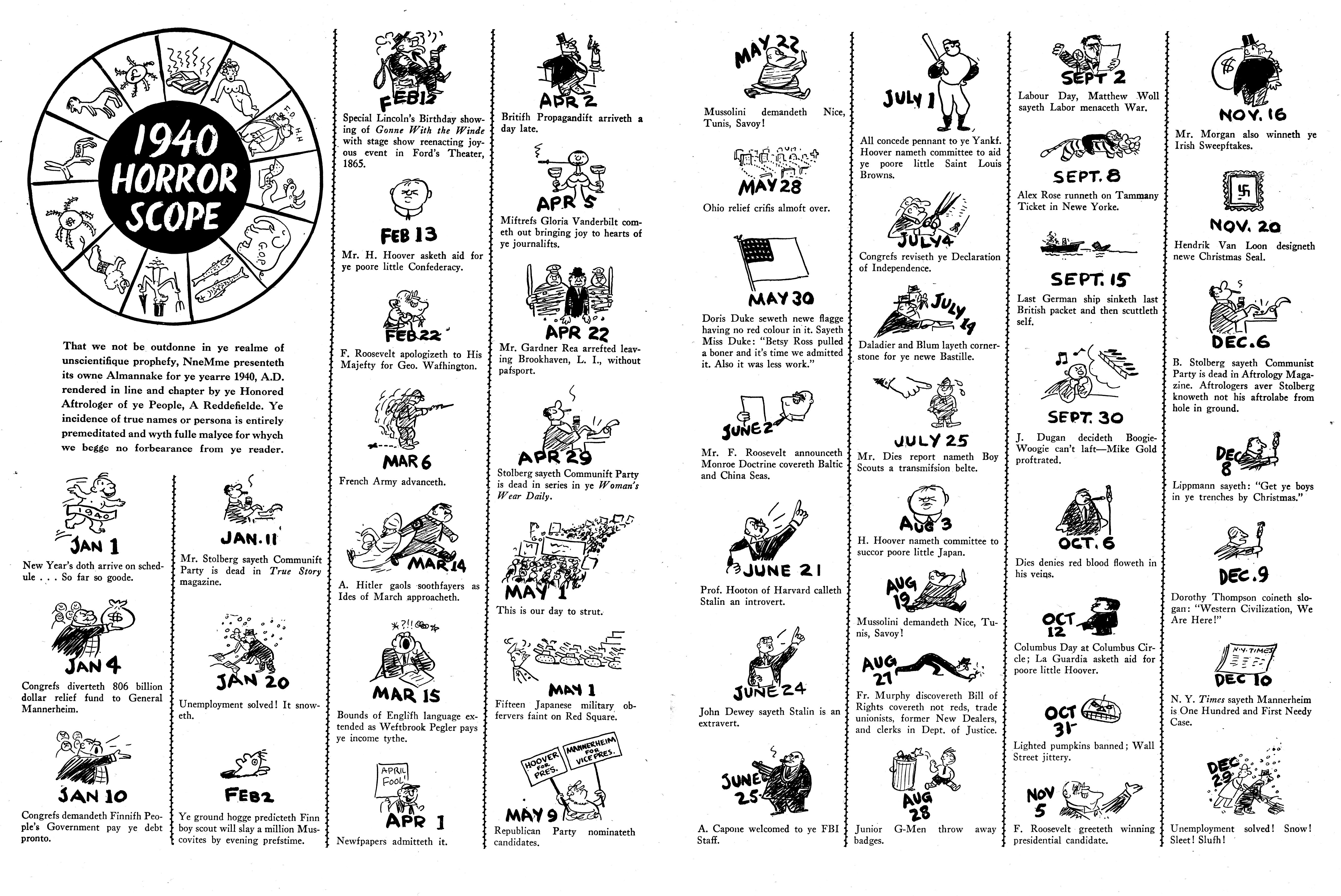
"1940 Horrorscope," published in New Masses, January 9, 1940

== Incumbents ==
=== Federal government ===
- President: Franklin D. Roosevelt (D-New York)
- Vice President: John Nance Garner (D-Texas)
- Chief Justice: Charles Evans Hughes (New York)
- Speaker of the House of Representatives:

William B. Bankhead (D-Alabama) (until September 15)
Sam Rayburn (D-Texas) (starting September 16)

- Senate Majority Leader: Alben W. Barkley (D-Kentucky)
- Congress: 76th

==== State governments ====
Governors and lieutenant governors

=== Governors ===
- Governor of Alabama: Frank M. Dixon (Democratic)
- Governor of Arizona: Robert Taylor Jones (Democratic)
- Governor of Arkansas: Carl Edward Bailey (Democratic)
- Governor of California: Culbert Olson (Democratic)
- Governor of Colorado: Ralph Lawrence Carr (Republican)
- Governor of Connecticut: Raymond E. Baldwin (Republican)
- Governor of Delaware: Richard C. McMullen (Democratic)
- Governor of Florida: Fred P. Cone (Democratic)
- Governor of Georgia: Eurith D. Rivers (Democratic)
- Governor of Idaho: C. A. Bottolfsen (Republican)
- Governor of Illinois: Henry Horner (Democratic) (until October 6), John H. Stelle (Democratic) (starting October 6)
- Governor of Indiana: M. Clifford Townsend (Democratic)
- Governor of Iowa: George A. Wilson (Republican)
- Governor of Kansas: Payne Ratner (Republican)
- Governor of Kentucky: Keen Johnson (Democratic)
- Governor of Louisiana: Earl K. Long (Democratic) (until May 14), Sam H. Jones (Democratic) (starting May 14)
- Governor of Maine: Lewis O. Barrows (Republican)
- Governor of Maryland: Herbert R. O'Conor (Democratic)
- Governor of Massachusetts: Leverett Saltonstall (Republican)
- Governor of Michigan: Luren Dickinson (Republican)
- Governor of Minnesota: Harold E. Stassen (Republican)
- Governor of Mississippi: Hugh L. White (Democratic) (until January 16), Paul B. Johnson, Sr. (Democratic) (starting January 16)
- Governor of Missouri: Lloyd C. Stark (Democratic)
- Governor of Montana: Roy E. Ayers (Democratic)
- Governor of Nebraska: Robert Leroy Cochran (Democratic)
- Governor of Nevada: Edward P. Carville (Democratic)
- Governor of New Hampshire: Francis P. Murphy (Republican)
- Governor of New Jersey: A. Harry Moore (Democratic)
- Governor of New Mexico: John E. Miles (Democratic)
- Governor of New York: Herbert H. Lehman (Democratic)
- Governor of North Carolina: Clyde R. Hoey (Democratic)
- Governor of North Dakota: John Moses (Democratic)
- Governor of Ohio: John W. Bricker (Republican)
- Governor of Oklahoma: Leon C. Phillips (Democratic)
- Governor of Oregon: Charles A. Sprague (Republican)
- Governor of Pennsylvania: Arthur James (Republican)
- Governor of Rhode Island: William Henry Vanderbilt III (Republican)
- Governor of South Carolina: Burnet R. Maybank (Democratic)
- Governor of South Dakota: Harlan J. Bushfield (Republican)
- Governor of Tennessee: Prentice Cooper (Democratic)
- Governor of Texas: W. Lee O'Daniel (Democratic)
- Governor of Utah: Henry H. Blood (Democratic)
- Governor of Vermont: George David Aiken (Republican)
- Governor of Virginia: James H. Price (Democratic)
- Governor of Washington: Clarence D. Martin (Democratic)
- Governor of West Virginia: Homer A. Holt (Democratic)
- Governor of Wisconsin: Julius P. Heil (Republican)
- Governor of Wyoming: Nels H. Smith (Republican)

=== Lieutenant governors ===
- Lieutenant Governor of Alabama: Albert A. Carmichael (Democratic)
- Lieutenant Governor of Arkansas: Robert L. Bailey (Democratic)
- Lieutenant Governor of California: Ellis E. Patterson (Democratic)
- Lieutenant Governor of Colorado: John Charles Vivian (Republican)
- Lieutenant Governor of Connecticut: James L. McConaughy (Republican)
- Lieutenant Governor of Delaware: Edward W. Cooch (Democratic)
- Lieutenant Governor of Idaho: Donald S. Whitehead (Republican)
- Lieutenant Governor of Illinois: John H. Stelle (Democratic) (until October 6), vacant (starting October 6)
- Lieutenant Governor of Indiana: Henry F. Schricker (Democratic)
- Lieutenant Governor of Iowa: Bourke B. Hickenlooper (Republican)
- Lieutenant Governor of Kansas: Carl E. Friend (Republican)
- Lieutenant Governor of Kentucky: Rodes K. Myers (Democratic)
- Lieutenant Governor of Louisiana: Coleman Lindsey (Democratic) (until month and day unknown), Marc M. Mouton (Democratic) (starting month and day unknown)
- Lieutenant Governor of Massachusetts: Horace T. Cahill (Republican)
- Lieutenant Governor of Michigan: vacant (until month and day unknown), Matilda Dodge Wilson (Republican) (starting month and day unknown)
- Lieutenant Governor of Minnesota: C. Elmer Anderson (Republican)
- Lieutenant Governor of Mississippi: Jacob Buehler Snider (Democratic) (until month and day unknown), Dennis Murphree (Democratic) (starting month and day unknown)
- Lieutenant Governor of Missouri: Frank Gaines Harris (Democratic)
- Lieutenant Governor of Montana: Hugh R. Adair (Democratic)
- Lieutenant Governor of Nebraska: William E. Johnson (Republican)
- Lieutenant Governor of Nevada: Maurice J. Sullivan (Democratic)
- Lieutenant Governor of New Mexico: James Murray, Sr. (Democratic)
- Lieutenant Governor of New York: Charles Poletti (Democratic)
- Lieutenant Governor of North Carolina: Wilkins P. Horton (Democratic)
- Lieutenant Governor of North Dakota: Jack A. Patterson (Republican)
- Lieutenant Governor of Ohio: Paul M. Herbert (Republican)
- Lieutenant Governor of Oklahoma: James E. Berry (Democratic)
- Lieutenant Governor of Pennsylvania: Samuel S. Lewis (Democratic)
- Lieutenant Governor of Rhode Island: James O. McManus (Republican)
- Lieutenant Governor of South Carolina: Joseph Emile Harley (Democratic)
- Lieutenant Governor of South Dakota: Donald McMurchie (Republican)
- Lieutenant Governor of Tennessee: Blan R. Maxwell (Democratic)
- Lieutenant Governor of Texas: Coke Robert Stevenson (Democratic)
- Lieutenant Governor of Vermont: William H. Wills (Republican)
- Lieutenant Governor of Virginia: Saxon W. Holt (Democratic) (until March 31), vacant (starting March 31)
- Lieutenant Governor of Washington: Victor A. Meyers (Democratic)
- Lieutenant Governor of Wisconsin: Walter S. Goodland (Republican)

== Events ==
=== January–March ===
- February 7 – RKO release Walt Disney's second full-length animated film, Pinocchio.
- February 9 – Mae West and W. C. Fields join comedic forces for My Little Chickadee with tremendous success. The film becomes one of the highest-grossing of the year.
- February 10 – Tom and Jerry make their debut in Puss Gets the Boot.
- February 27 – Martin Kamen and Sam Ruben discover carbon-14.
- February 29 – The 12th Academy Awards, hosted by Bob Hope, are presented at the Ambassador Hotel in Los Angeles, with Victor Fleming's Gone with the Wind winning eight awards out of thirteen nominations, including Outstanding Production and Best Director for Fleming.
- March – Truth or Consequences debuts on NBC Radio.
- March 2 – Cartoon character Elmer Fudd makes his debut in the animated short Elmer's Candid Camera.
- March 4 – Kings Canyon National Park is established in California.

=== April–June ===
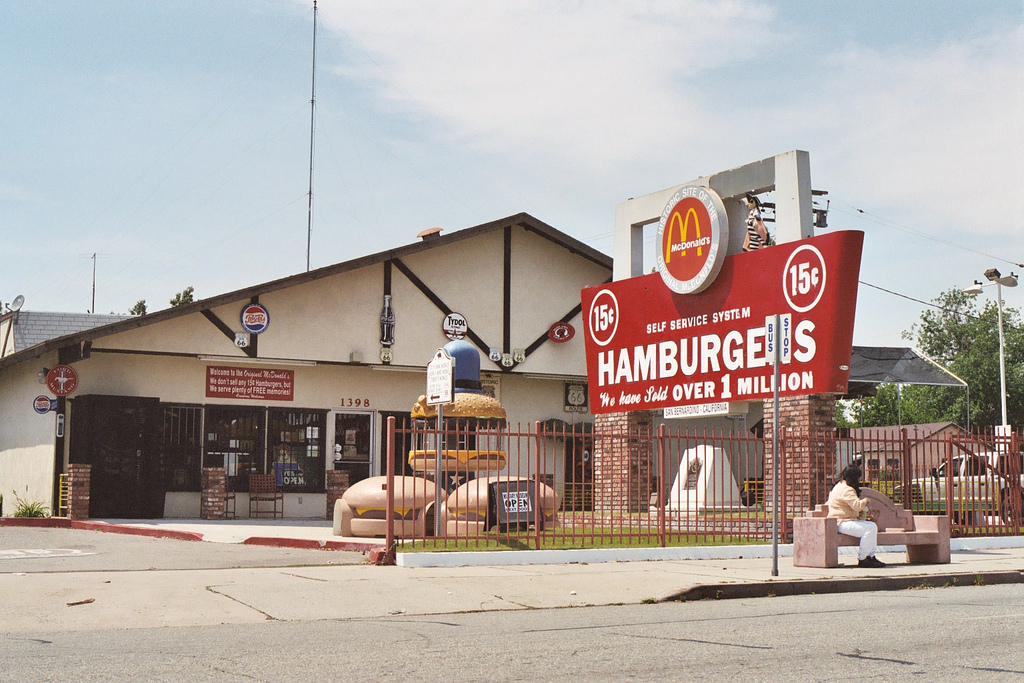
May 15: The first McDonald's restaurant (photographed in 2005).

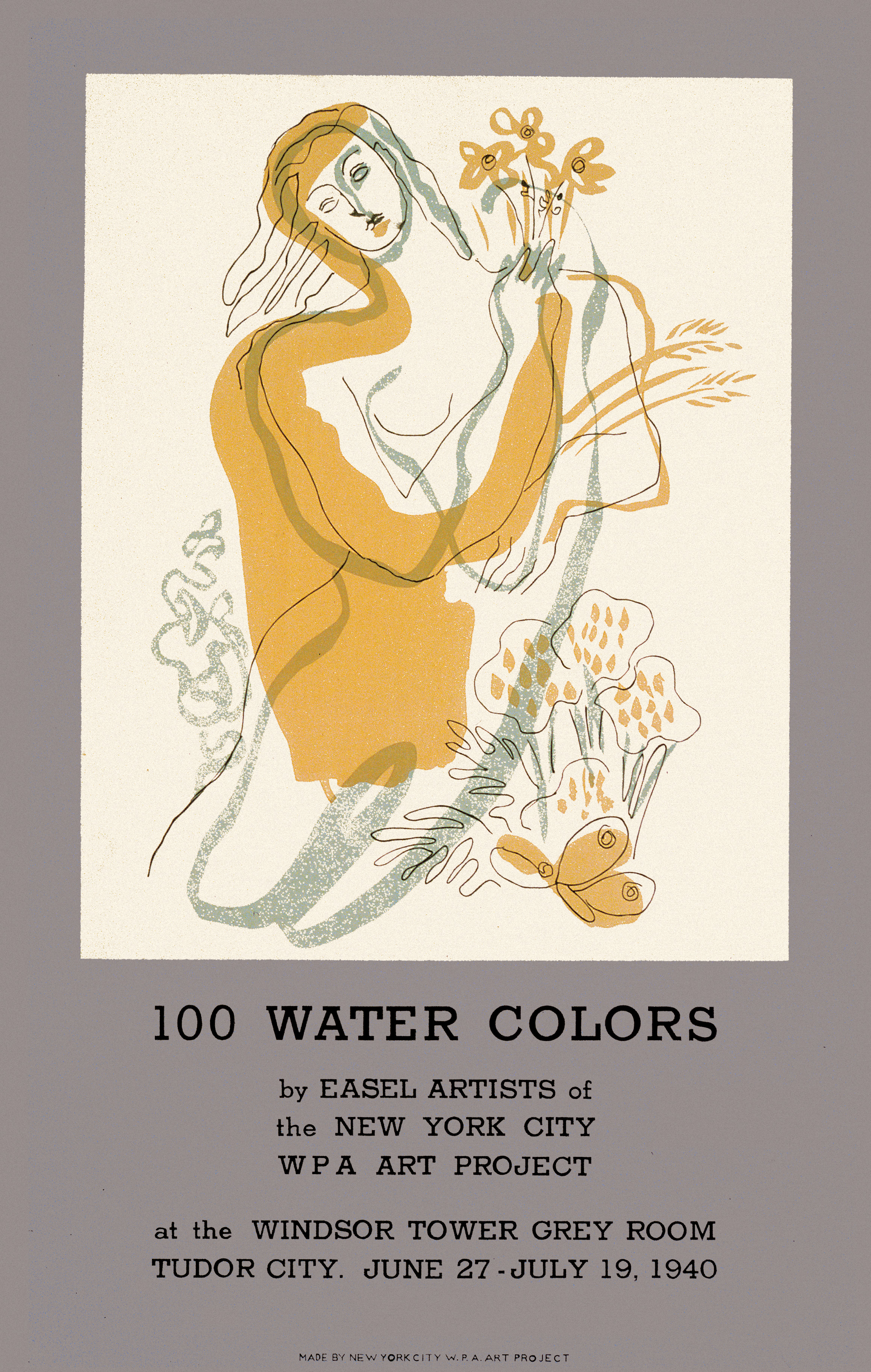
June 27: "100 Water Colors" show by Federal Arts Project opens in New York City

- April – Dick Grayson (AKA as Robin, the Boy Wonder) first appears as Batman's sidekick in Detective Comics#38.
- April 1 (April Fools' Day) – Census date for the 16th U.S. Census.
- April 3 – Isle Royale National Park is established in Michigan.
- April 7 – Booker T. Washington becomes the first African American to be depicted on a United States postage stamp.
- April 10 – WWII: All Danish and Norwegian assets are frozen in the United States after both countries were invaded by Nazi Germany.
- April 12 – Opening day at Jamaica Racetrack features the use of pari-mutuel betting equipment, a departure from bookmaking heretofore used exclusively throughout New York state. Other NY tracks follow suit later in 1940.
- April 13 – New York Rangers win their Third Stanley Cup in ice hockey (and last until 1994) by defeating the Toronto Maple Leafs 4 games to 2.
- April 21 – Take It or Leave It makes it debut on CBS Radio, with Bob Hawk as host.
- April 23 – Rhythm Club fire: A fire at the Rhythm Night Club in Natchez, Mississippi kills 209.
- April 25- The Joker and Catwomen debut in Batman #1 (cover-dated spring 1940).
- May 10 – WWII: The assets of all foreign nationals from The Netherlands, Belgium and Luxembourg are frozen.
- May 15
  - The very first McDonald's restaurant opens in San Bernardino, California.
  - Women's stockings made of nylon are first placed on sale across the U.S. Almost five million pairs are bought on this day.
- May 16 – U.S. President Franklin D. Roosevelt, addressing a joint session of Congress, asks for an extraordinary credit of approximately $900 million to finance construction of at least 50,000 airplanes per year.
- May 18 – The 6.9 M_{w} El Centro earthquake affects California's Imperial Valley with a maximum Mercalli intensity of X (Extreme), causing nine deaths and twenty injuries. Financial losses are around $6 million. Significant damage also occurs in Mexicali, Mexico.
- May 25 – The Crypt of Civilization at Oglethorpe University is sealed.
- May 29 – The Vought XF4U-1, prototype of the F4U Corsair U.S. fighter later used in WWII, makes its first flight.
- June 10 – U.S. President Franklin D. Roosevelt denounces Italy's actions with his "Stab in the Back" speech during the graduation ceremonies of the University of Virginia.
- June 14 – U.S. President Franklin D. Roosevelt signs the Naval Expansion Act into law, which aims to increase the United States Navy's tonnage by 11%.
- June 16 – The Sturgis Motorcycle Rally is held for the first time in Sturgis, South Dakota.
- June 17 – WWII: Assets of all foreign nationals from France and Monaco are frozen.
- June 22 – The first Dairy Queen soft-serve ice cream parlor opens in Edina, Minnesota.
- June 24 – U.S. politics: The Republican Party begins its national convention in Philadelphia and nominates Wendell Willkie as its candidate for president.
- June 28 – Smith Act (Alien Registration Act) signed into law, setting criminal penalties for advocating the overthrow of the U.S. government by force or violence, and requiring all aliens in the U.S. to register with the federal government.

=== July–September ===
- July 1 – The doomed first Tacoma Narrows Bridge opens for traffic, built with an 8-foot (2.4 m) girder and 190 feet (58 m) above the water, as the third longest suspension bridge in the world.
- July 15 – U.S. politics: The Democratic Party begins its national convention in Chicago and nominates Franklin D. Roosevelt for an unprecedented third term as president.
- July 20 – The Arroyo Seco Parkway, one of the first freeways built in the U.S., opens to traffic, connecting downtown Los Angeles with Pasadena, California.
- July 25 – WWII: President Roosevelt announces a ban on Japan acquiring high-octane aviation fuel from the United States. A ban is also placed on some grades of steel and scrap iron along with some lubricants being banned.
- July 27 – Bugs Bunny makes his debut in the Oscar-nominated cartoon short, A Wild Hare.
- August 4 – Gen. John J. Pershing, in a nationwide radio broadcast, urges all-out aid to Britain in order to defend the Americas, while Charles Lindbergh speaks to an isolationist rally at Soldier Field in Chicago.
- September – The U.S. Army 45th Infantry Division (previously a National Guard Division in Arizona, Colorado, New Mexico and Oklahoma), is activated and ordered into federal service for 1 year, to engage in a training program in Ft. Sill and Louisiana, prior to serving in World War II.
- September 2 – WWII: An agreement between America and Great Britain is announced to the effect that 50 U.S. destroyers needed for escort work will be transferred to Great Britain. In return, America gains 99-year leases on British bases in the North Atlantic, West Indies and Bermuda.
- September 12 – The Hercules Munitions Plant in Succasunna-Kenvil, New Jersey explodes, killing 55 people.
- September 16 – WWII: The Selective Training and Service Act of 1940 is signed into law by Franklin D. Roosevelt, creating the first peacetime draft in U.S. history.
- September 26 – WWII: The United States imposes a total embargo on all scrap metal shipments to Japan.

=== October–December ===
November 5: FDR becomes the first and only president elected to a third term.

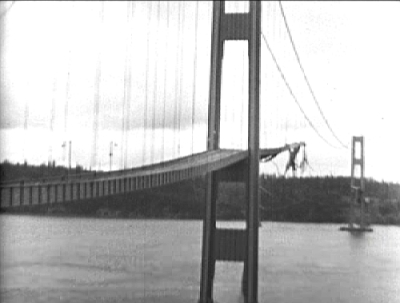
Tacoma Narrows Bridge Collapsed

- October 1 – The first section of the Pennsylvania Turnpike, the country's first long-distance controlled-access highway, is opened between Irwin and Carlisle.
- October 8 – The Cincinnati Reds defeat the Detroit Tigers, 4 games to 3, to win their second World Series championship in baseball.
- October 10 – WWII: The assets of all Romanian nationals in the United States are frozen. A different date being that of October 9 is reported in a presidential advisory commission report from 2000.
- October 16 – The draft registration of approximately 16 million men begins in the United States.
- October 29 – The Selective Service System lottery is held in Washington, D.C.
- November 5 – 1940 United States presidential election: Democratic incumbent Franklin D. Roosevelt defeats Republican challenger Wendell Willkie and becomes the nation's first and only third-term president.
- November 7 – In Tacoma, Washington, the Tacoma Narrows Bridge (nicknamed the "Galloping Gertie") collapses in a 42-mile-per-hour (68 km/h) wind storm, causing the center span of the bridge to sway. When it collapses, a 600-foot-long (180 m) design of the center span falls 190 feet above the water, killing Tubby, a black male Cocker Spaniel dog.
- November 11 – Armistice Day Blizzard: An unexpected blizzard kills 144 in the Midwest.
- November 12 – Case of Hansberry v. Lee, 311 U.S. 32 (1940), decided, allowing a racially restrictive covenant to be lifted.
- November 13 – Walt Disney's third feature film, Fantasia, is released. It is the first box office failure for Disney, though it recoups its cost years later and becomes one of the most highly regarded of Disney's films.
- November 16 – An unexploded pipe bomb is found in the Consolidated Edison office building (only years later is the culprit, George Metesky, apprehended).
- December 8 – The Chicago Bears, in what will become the most one-sided victory in National Football League history, defeat the Washington Redskins 73–0 in the 1940 NFL Championship Game.
- December 17 – President Franklin D. Roosevelt, at his regular press conference, first sets forth the outline of his plan to send aid to Great Britain that will become known as Lend-Lease.
- December 20
  - 1940 New Hampshire earthquakes: A 5.3 M_{w} earthquake shakes New England with a maximum Mercalli intensity of VII (Very strong). This first event in a doublet earthquake is followed four days later by a 5.6 M_{w} shock, but total damage from the events is light.
  - Atlas Comics and Timely Comics publish the first edition of Captain America Comics by Joe Simon and Jack Kirby, marking the first appearance of Captain America.
- December 21 – Writer F. Scott Fitzgerald (author of The Great Gatsby) dies of a heart attack aged 44 in the apartment of Hollywood gossip columnist Sheilah Graham, leaving his novel The Last Tycoon unfinished.
- December 29 – Franklin D. Roosevelt, in a fireside chat to the nation, declares that the United States must become "the great Arsenal of Democracy."
- December 30 – California's first modern freeway, the future State Route 110, opens to traffic in Pasadena, California, as the Arroyo Seco Parkway (later the Pasadena Freeway).

=== Undated ===
- Walter Knott begins construction of a California ghost town replica at Knott's Berry Farm.

== Births ==
=== January ===
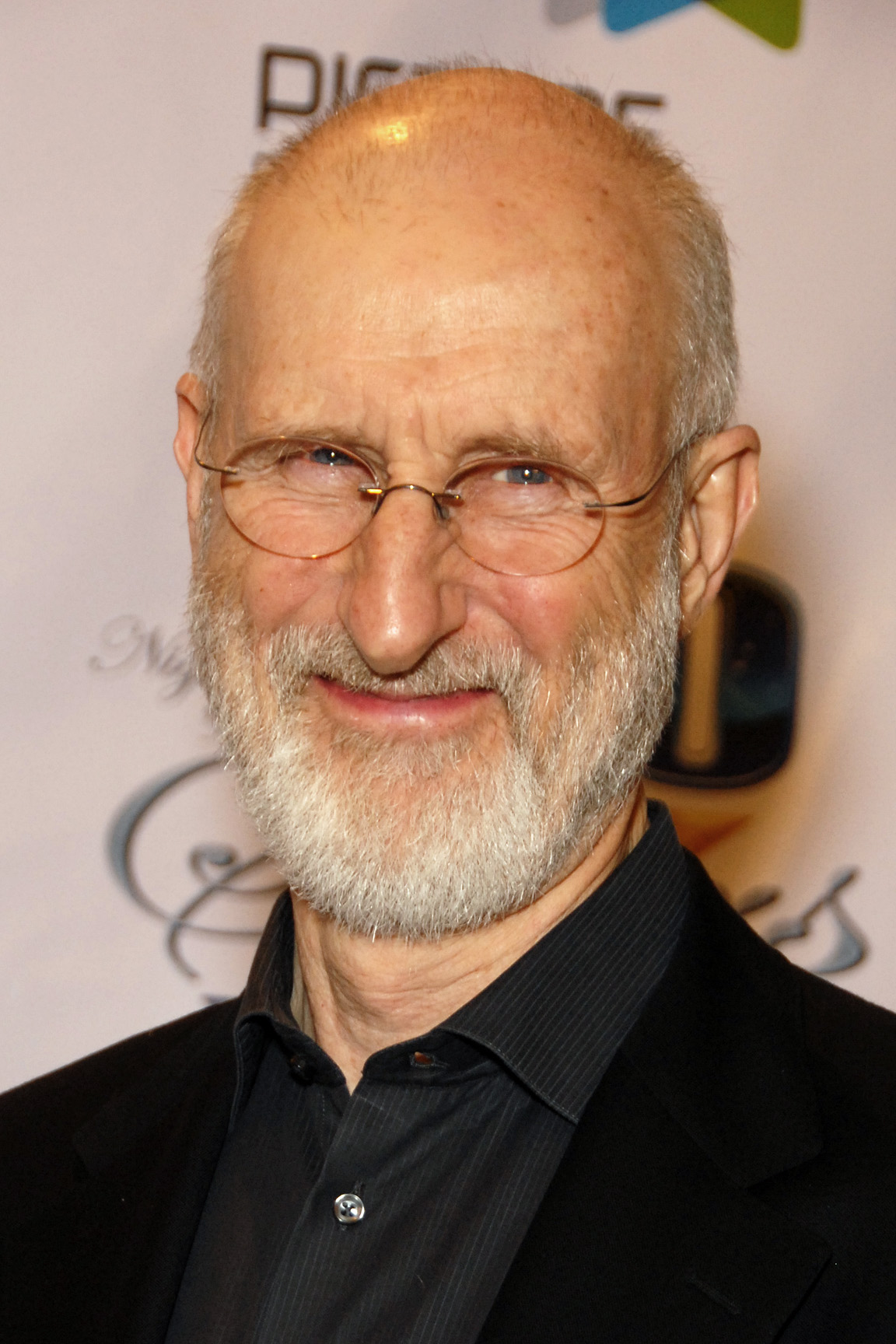
James Cromwell

- January 2 – Jim Bakker, televangelist, sometime husband of Tammy Faye (d. 2026)
- January 4 – Helmut Jahn, German-born American architect (d. 2021)
- January 6 – Penny Lernoux, journalist and author (d. 1989)
- January 7 – Jim Hannan, baseball player (d. 2024)
- January 13 – Edmund White, author (d. 2025)
- January 14 – Julian Bond, African-American civil rights activist (d. 2015)
- January 15 – Arlie Russell Hochschild, professor emerita of sociology
- January 19 – Harry Booth, baseball and basketball coach (d. 2022)
- January 20 – Carol Heiss, figure skater
- January 21
  - Jeremy Jacobs, businessman
  - Jack Nicklaus, golfer
- January 23 – Jimmy Castor, African-American funk, R&B and soul saxophonist (d. 2012)
- January 27
  - James Cromwell, actor
  - Brian O'Leary, scientist, author and NASA astronaut (d. 2011)
- January 28 – Al Strobel, actor (d. 2022)
- January 29 – Katharine Ross, actress
- January 31 – Stuart Margolin, actor (d. 2022)

=== February ===
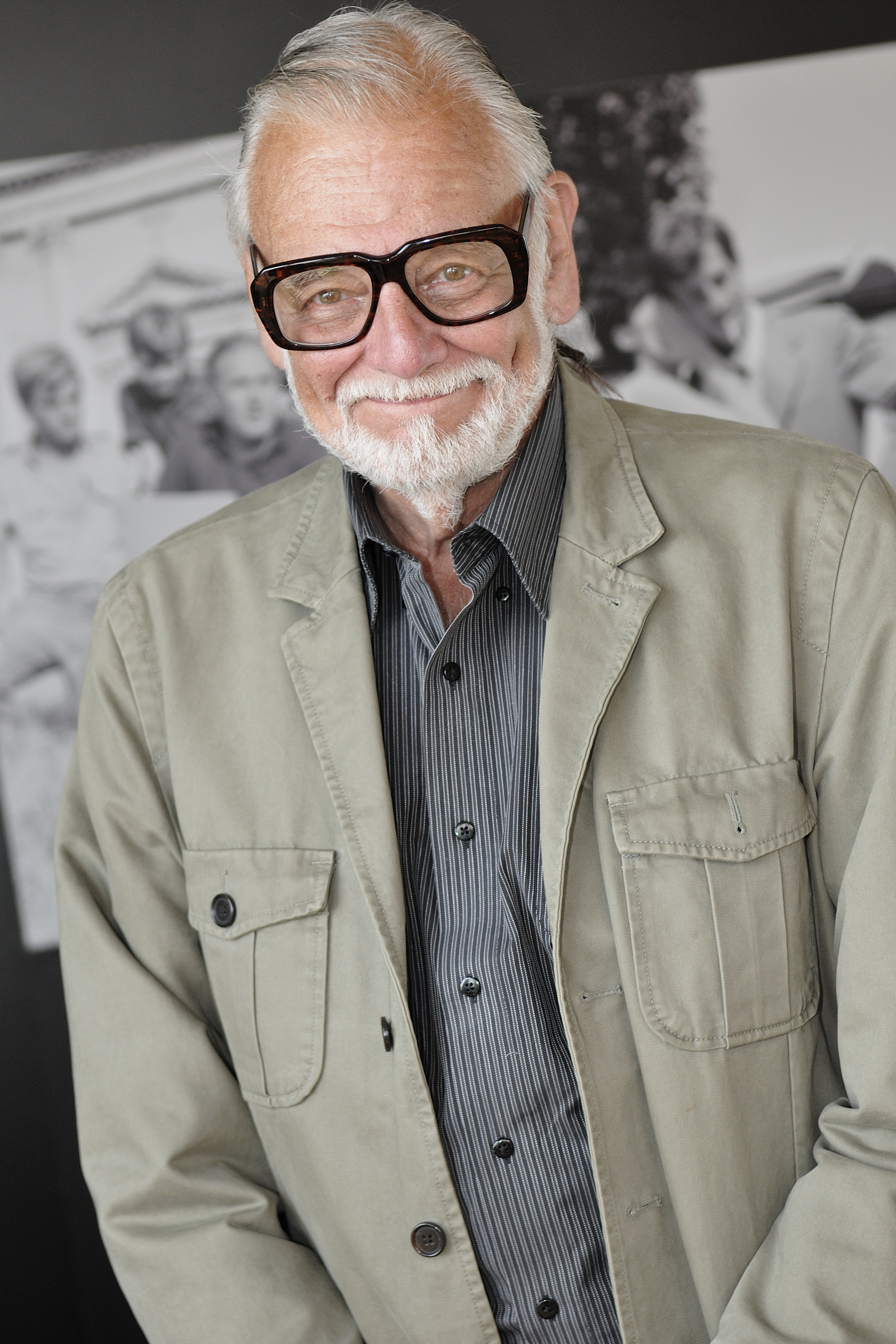
George A. Romero

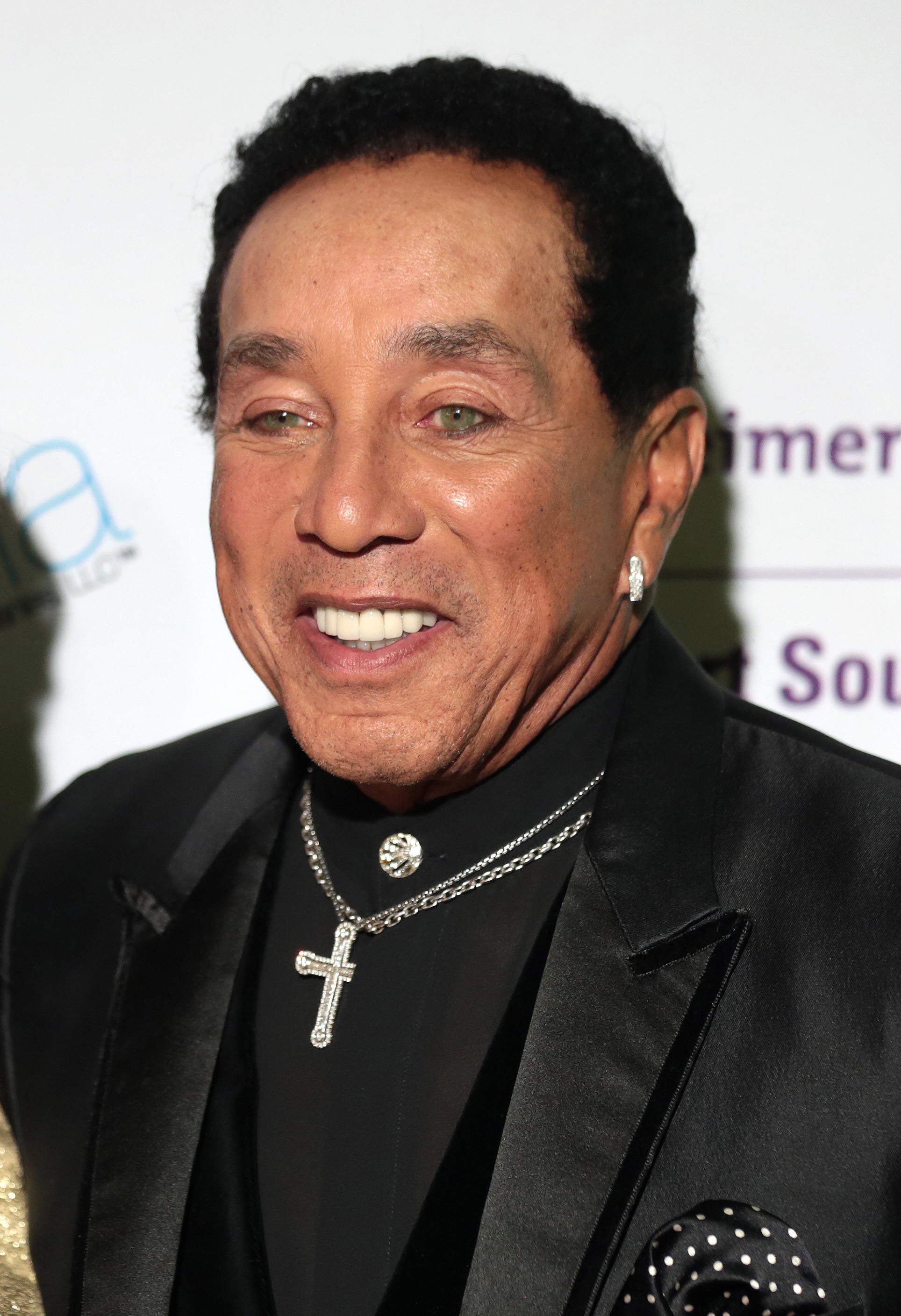
Smokey Robinson

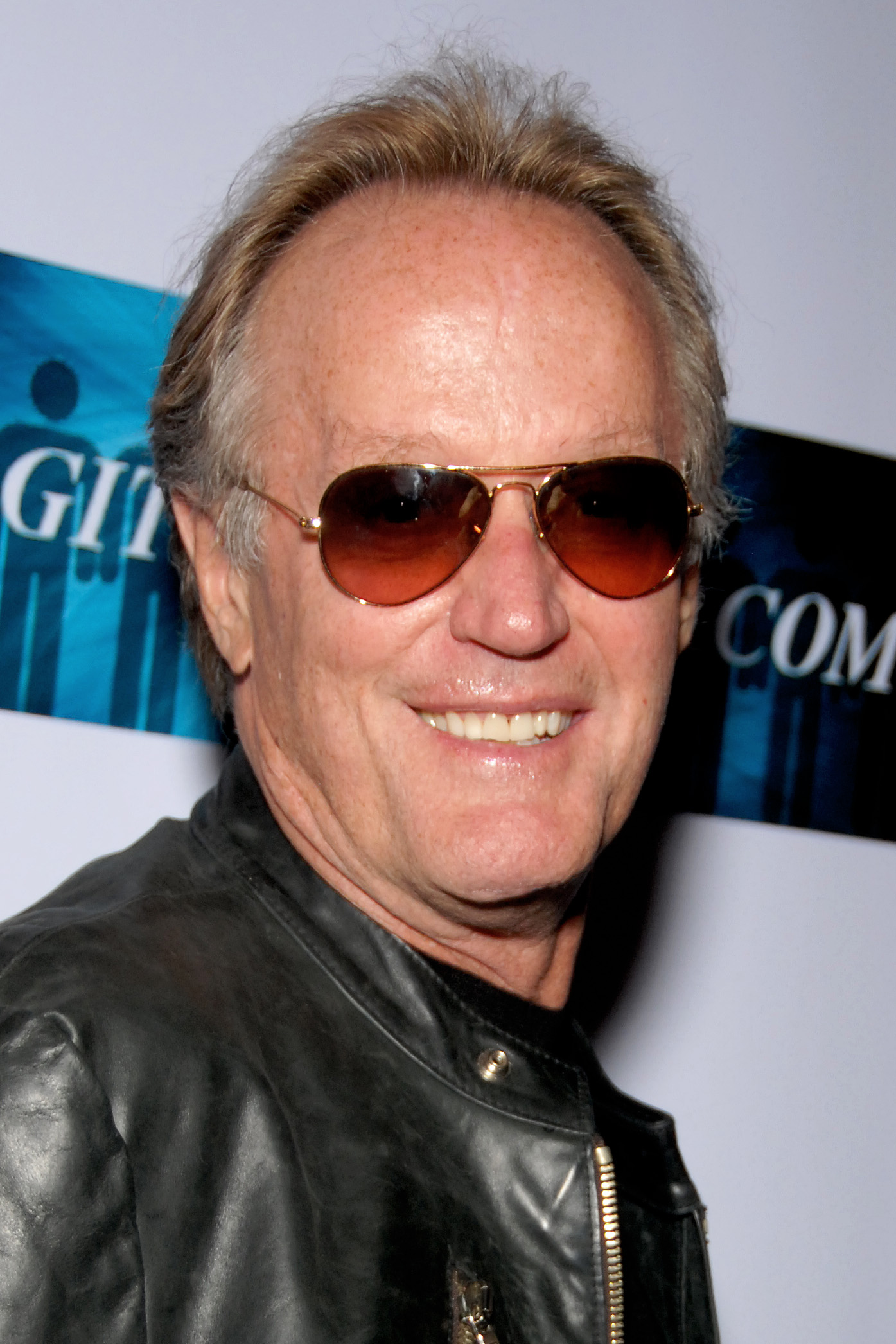
Peter Fonda

- February 2 – Odell Brown, jazz organist (d. 2011)
- February 3 – Fran Tarkenton, American football player
- February 4 – George A. Romero, film writer and director (d. 2017)
- February 6 – Tom Brokaw, television news reporter
- February 8
  - Ted Koppel, journalist
  - Joe South, country singer-songwriter (d. 2012)
  - Donald W. Stewart, politician
- February 12
  - Hank Brown, politician
  - Richard Lynch, actor (d. 2012)
- February 13 – John Stanley Pottinger, novelist and lawyer (d. 2024)
- February 14 – James Maynard, businessman, co-founded Golden Corral
- February 15 – John Hadl, American football player and coach (d. 2022)
- February 17
  - Chris Newman, sound mixer, director
  - Gene Pitney, American pop singer (d. 2006)
- February 19 – Smokey Robinson, African-American musician
- February 21 – John Lewis, African-American politician, civil rights leader (d. 2020)
- February 22
  - Billy Name, born William G. Linich, photographer and Warhol archivist (d. 2022)
  - Chet Walker, basketball player (d. 2024)
- February 23 – Peter Fonda, actor (d. 2019)
- February 24
  - Pete Duel, actor (d. 1971)
  - Jimmy Ellis, African-American professional boxer (d. 2014)
- February 25 – Ron Santo, baseball player (d. 2010)
- February 27 – Howard Hesseman, actor (d. 2022)
- February 28
  - Mario Andretti, Italian-born race car driver
  - Joe South, singer-songwriter (d. 2012)
- February 29 – Billy Turner, horse trainer (d. 2021)

=== March ===
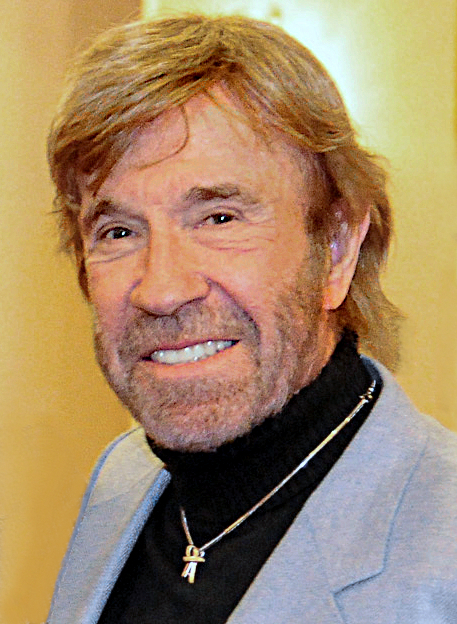
Chuck Norris

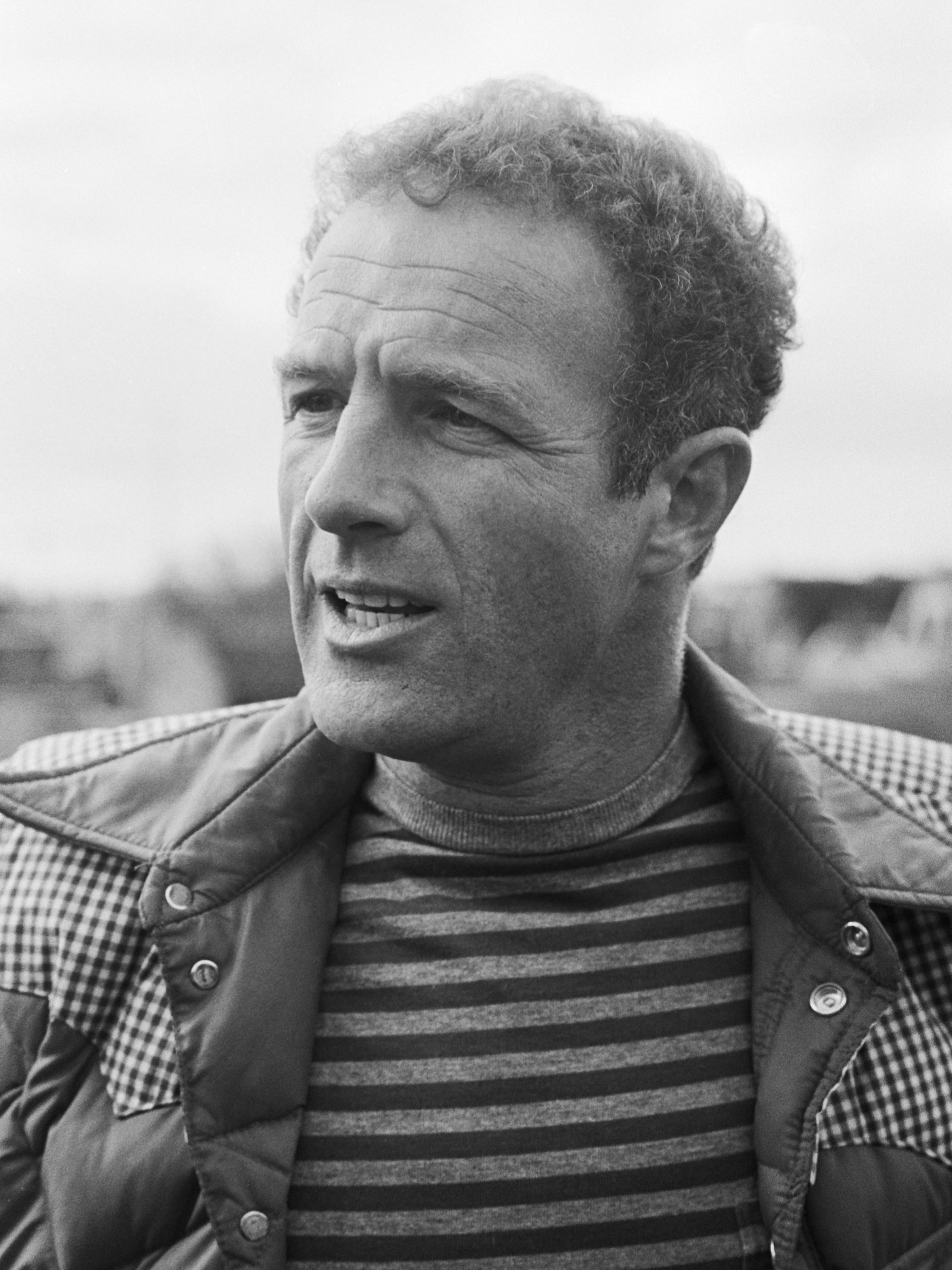
James Caan

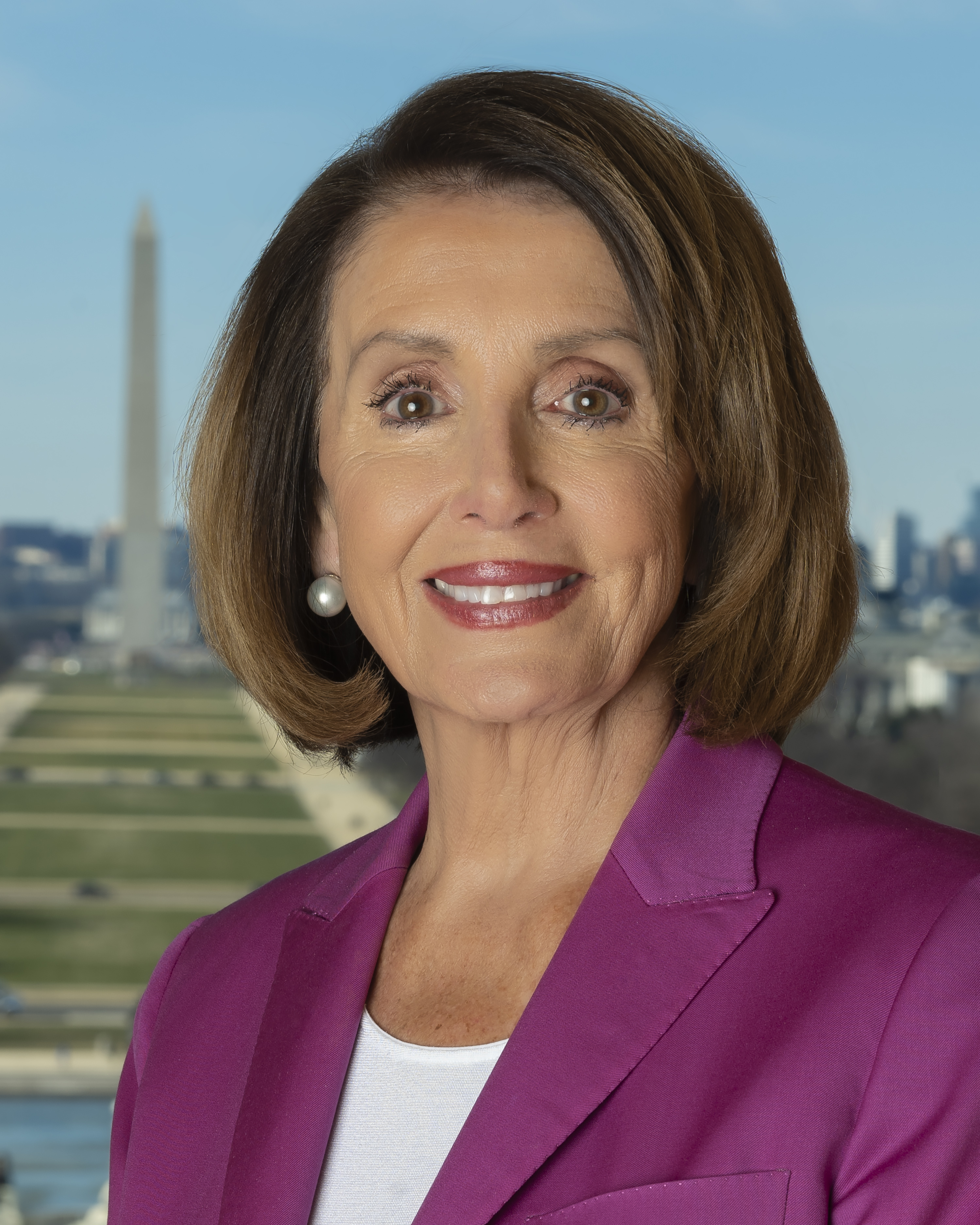
Nancy Pelosi

- March 5 – Mary Rose Oakar, American politician (d. 2025)
- March 6 – Willie Stargell, African-American baseball player (d. 2001)
- March 7 – Daniel J. Travanti, American actor
- March 10
  - Chuck Norris, American actor and martial artist (d. 2026)
  - Dean Torrence, American singer
- March 12 – Al Jarreau, African-American singer (d. 2017)
- March 13 – Candi Staton, American singer
- March 15 – Phil Lesh, American rock guitarist (Grateful Dead) (d. 2024)
- March 17 – Mark White, American politician (d. 2017)
- March 18 – Mark Medoff, American playwright and screenwriter (d. 2019)
- March 19 – Billy Beasley, American politician
- March 20 – Mary Ellen Mark, American photographer (d. 2015)
- March 21 – Solomon Burke, African-American singer, songwriter (d. 2010)
- March 22 – Garland Boyette, American football player (d. 2022)
- March 25 – Anita Bryant, American entertainer (d. 2024)
- March 26
  - James Caan, American actor (d. 2022)
  - Nancy Pelosi, American politician
- March 27 – Austin Pendleton, American actor, playwright, theatre director and instructor
- March 29
  - Thomas Cahill, American scholar and writer (d. 2022)
  - Ray Davis, American bass musician (P-Funk) (d. 2005)
- March 31
  - Barney Frank, American politician (d. 2026)
  - Patrick Leahy, American politician

=== April ===
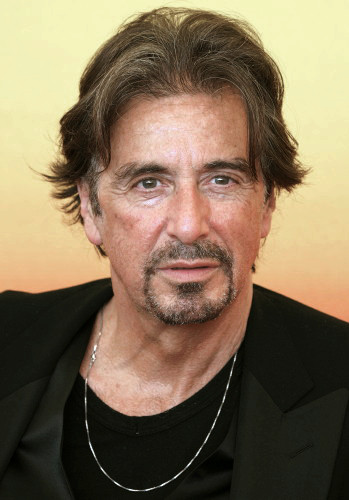
Al Pacino

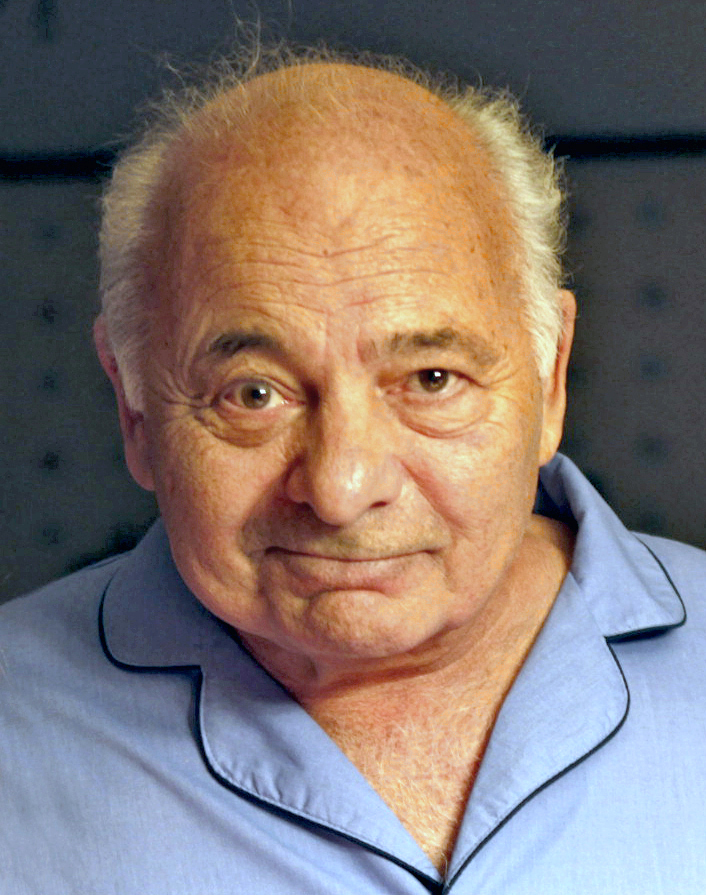
Burt Young

- April 8 – John Havlicek, American basketball player (d. 2019)
- April 12
  - John Hagee, American televangelist
  - Herbie Hancock, African-American pianist, keyboardist, bandleader, composer and actor
- April 15
  - Willie Davis, American baseball player (d. 2010)
  - Julie Sommars, American actress
  - Robert Walker, American actor (d. 2019)
- April 17 – Chuck Menville, American animator, writer (d. 1992)
- April 18 – Joseph L. Goldstein, American biochemist, recipient of the Nobel Prize in Physiology or Medicine
- April 20 – James Gammon, actor (d. 2010)
- April 24
  - Sue Grafton, detective novelist (d. 2017)
  - Robert Knight, American singer (d. 2017)
  - Michael Parks, American actor, singer (d. 2017)
- April 25 – Al Pacino, American actor and film director
- April 30
  - Robert Jervis, American political scientist (d. 2021)
  - Burt Young, American actor, author and painter (d. 2023)

=== May ===
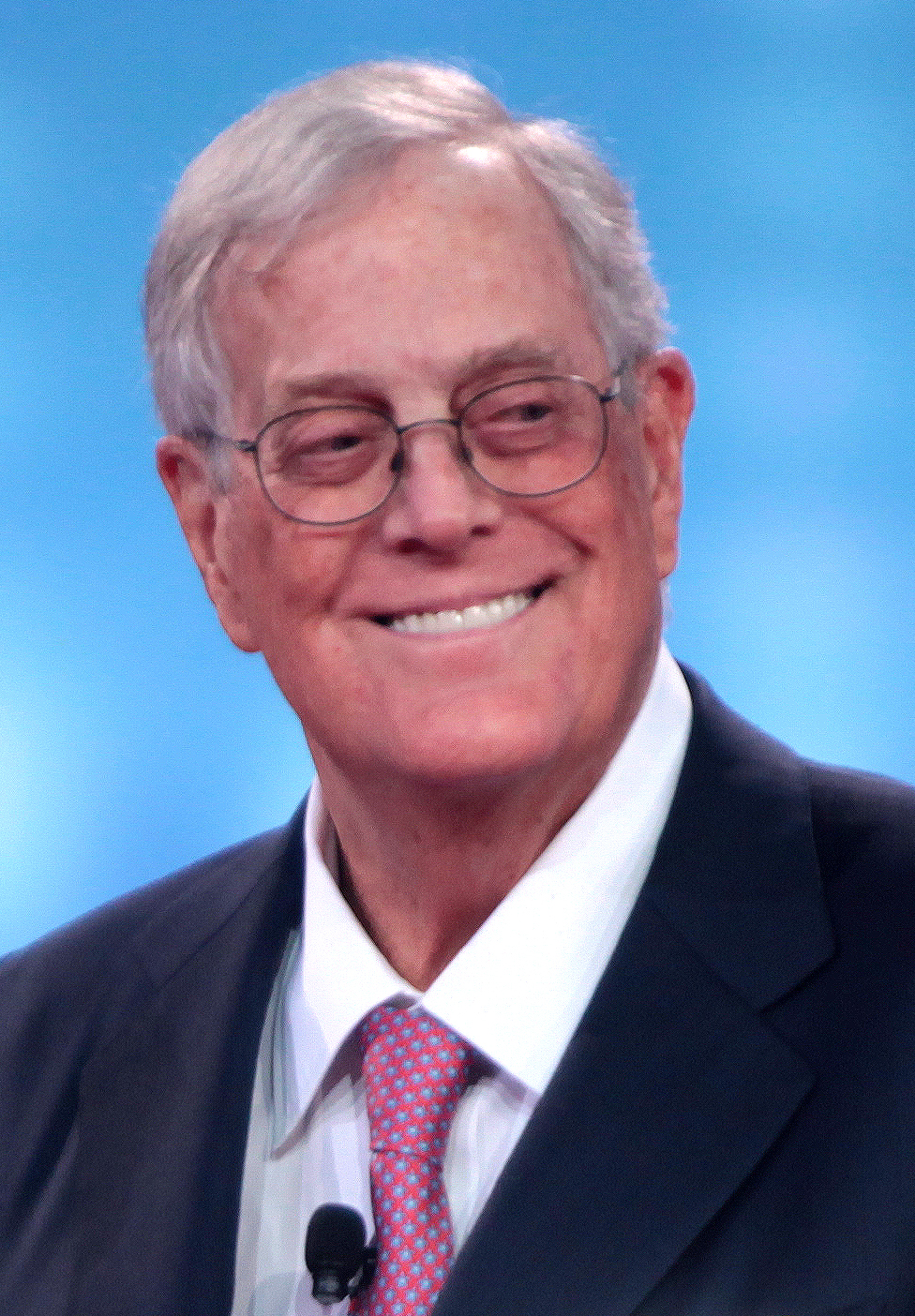
David Koch

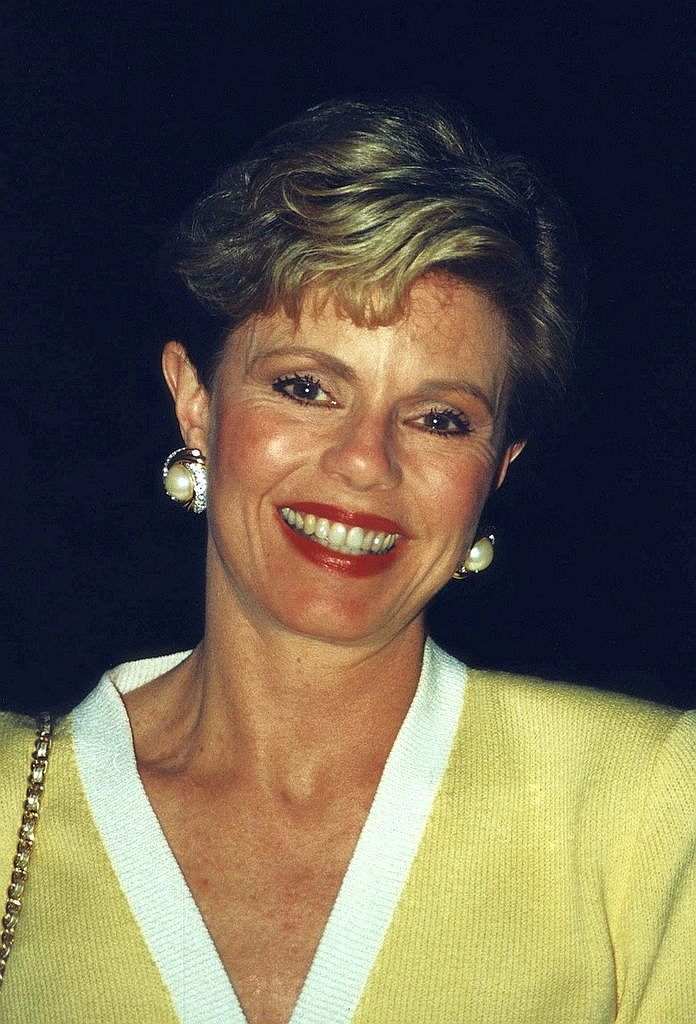
Toni Tennille

- May 1 – Allan M. Siegal, American newspaper editor and journalist (d. 2022)
- May 3 – David Koch, American billionaire businessman, philanthropist and political activist (d. 2019)
- May 5
  - Lance Henriksen, American actor
  - Lucy Simon, American composer (d. 2022)
- May 7 – Kim Chernin, American feminist writer and poet (d. 2020)
- May 8
  - Peter Benchley, American author (Jaws) (d. 2006)
  - Emilio Delgado, American actor (Sesame Street), singer and activist (d. 2022)
  - Ricky Nelson, American singer (d. 1985)
  - Toni Tennille, American pop singer
- May 9 – James L. Brooks, American film producer, writer
- May 10 – Wayne A. Downing, American army general (d. 2007)
- May 15
  - Lainie Kazan, American actress and singer
  - Don Nelson, American basketball player and coach
- May 17 – Alan Kay, computer scientist
- May 18 – Lenny Lipton, inventor (d. 2022)
- May 19 – John Esposito, American academic (d. 2026)
- May 20 – Shorty Long, African-American soul music singer, songwriter, musician and record producer (Here Comes The Judge) (d. 1969)
- May 22 – Bernard Shaw, African-American journalist and television news reporter (d. 2022)
- May 29 – Tyree Scott, labor leader and civil rights activist (d. 2003)

=== June ===
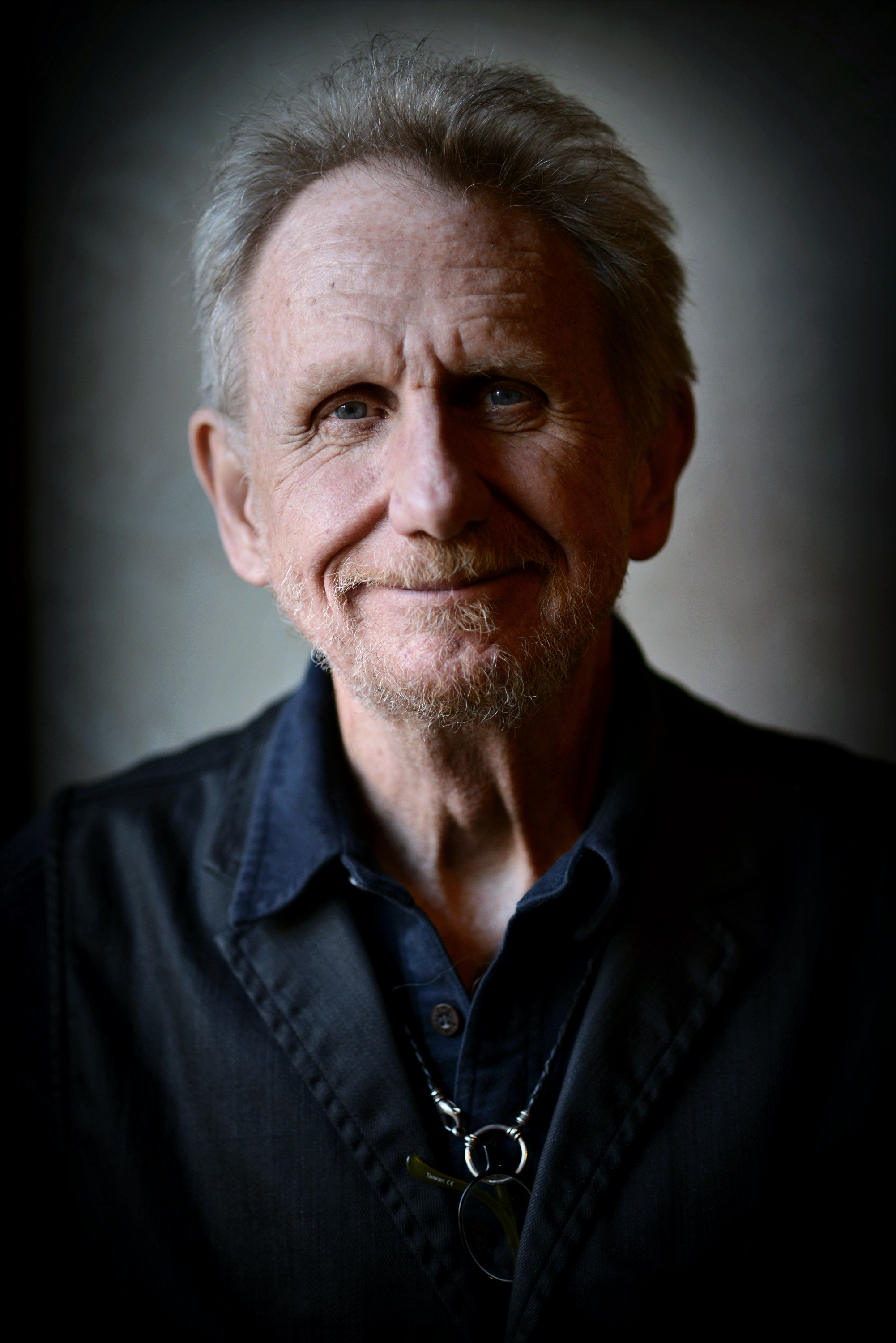
René Auberjonois

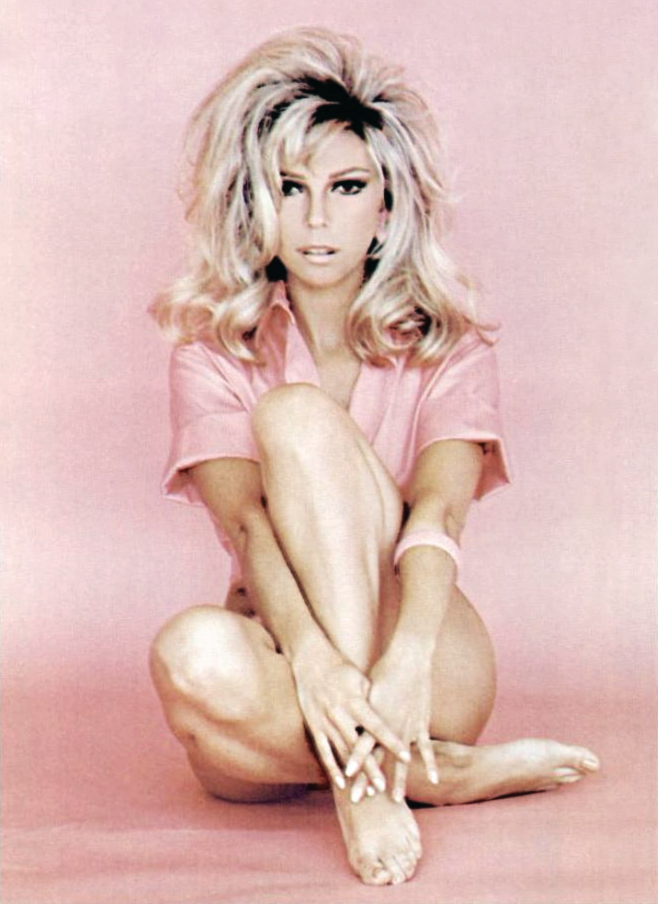
Nancy Sinatra

- June 1
  - René Auberjonois, actor (d. 2019)
  - Wayne Kemp, country singer-songwriter and guitarist (d. 2015)
  - Kip Thorne, theoretical physicist and Nobel laureate
- June 3 – Connie Saylor, race car driver (d. 1993)
- June 4 – Edward A. Brudno, American fighter pilot and prisoner of war during the Vietnam War (d. 1973)
- June 7
  - Samuel Little, serial killer (d. 2020)
  - Evi Nemeth, author and engineer (d. 2013)
- June 8
  - Arthur Elgort, photographer
  - Nancy Sinatra, singer
  - Jim Wickwire, lawyer and mountaineer
- June 9 – Roger J. Phillips, geophysicist (d. 2020)
- June 13 – Bobby Freeman, singer, songwriter (d. 2017)
- June 14 – Jack Bannon, actor (d. 2017)
- June 16
  - Neil Goldschmidt, politician (d. 2024)
  - Thea White, actress (d. 2021)
- June 19 – Shirley Muldowney, race car driver
- June 21 – Mariette Hartley, actress
- June 23 – Wilma Rudolph, track & field athlete and 3-time Olympic winner (d. 1994)
- June 24 – Hope Cooke, socialite, Queen Consort of Sikkim
- June 26 – Lucinda Childs, actress, postmodern dancer and choreographer

=== July ===
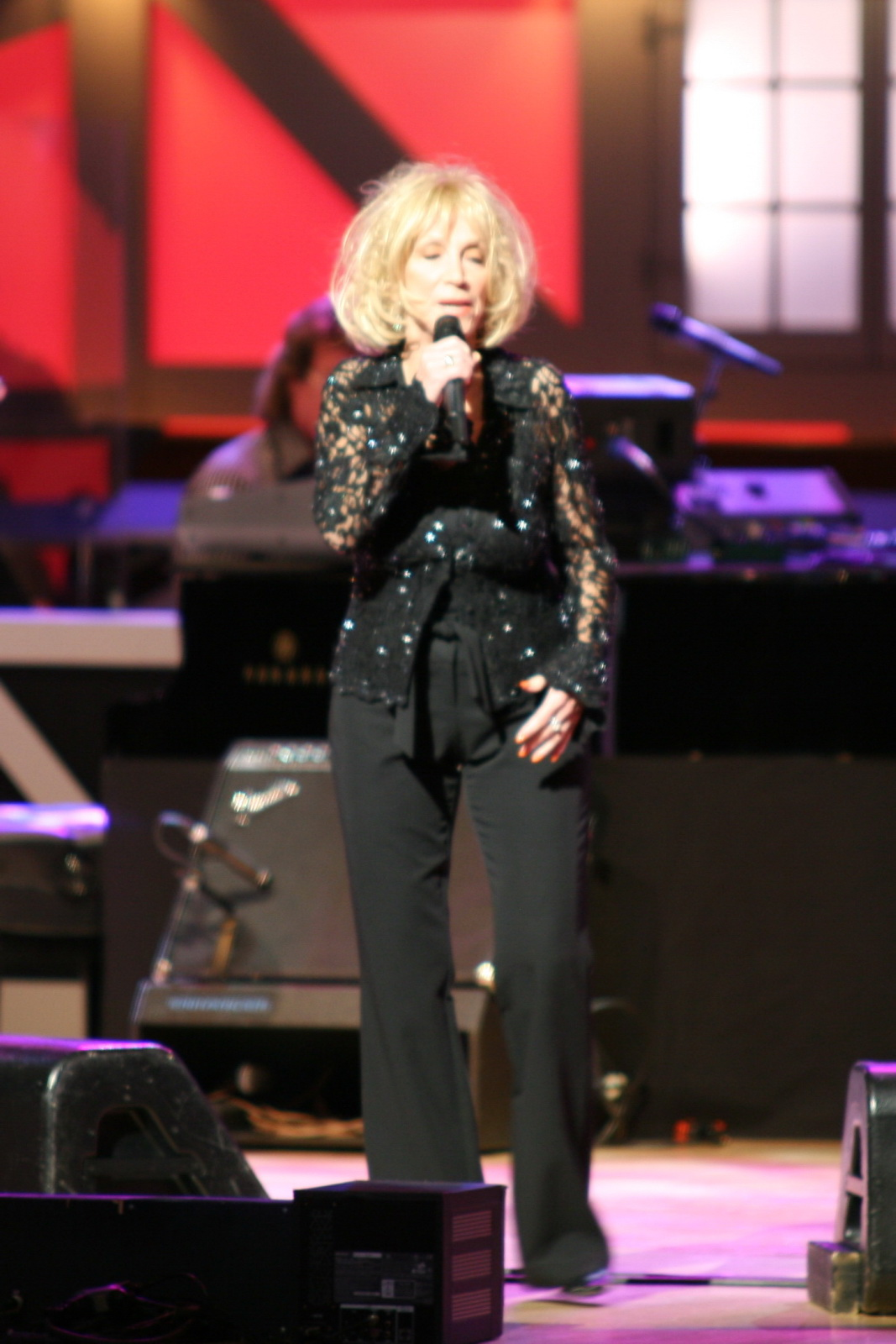
Jeannie Seely

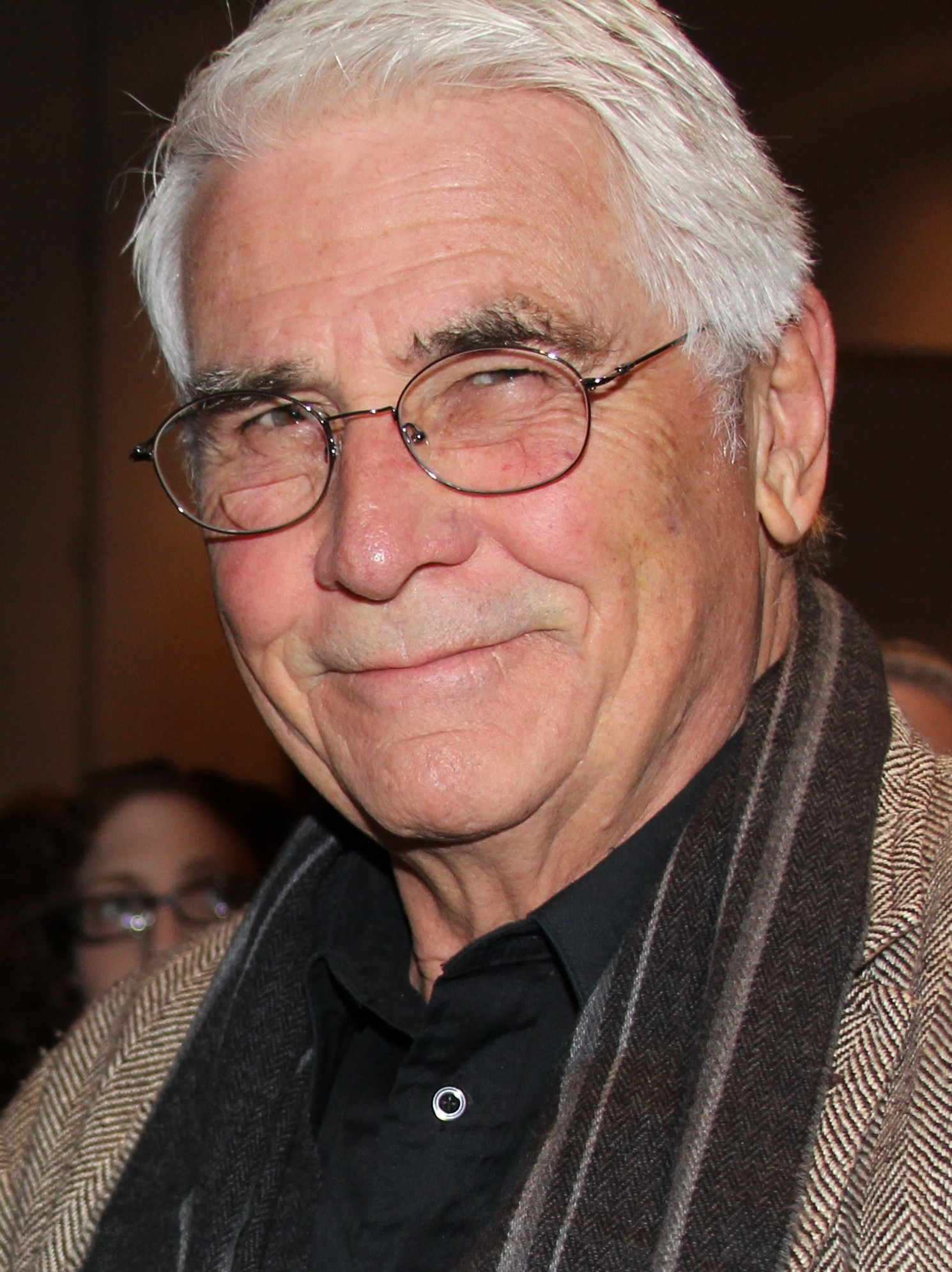
James Brolin

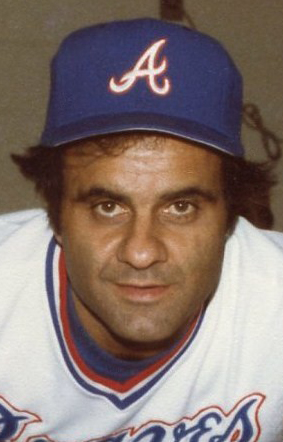
Joe Torre

- July 2 – Joshua Bryant, American actor, director, author and speaker (d. 2024)
- July 3
  - Fontella Bass, African-American soul singer ("Rescue Me") (d. 2012)
  - Michael Cole, American actor (d. 2024)
  - Lance Larson, American swimmer, Olympic champion, world record-holder in four events (d. 2024)
  - Chuck Sieminski, American football player (d. 2020)
  - Lamar Alexander, American politician
- July 6 – Jeannie Seely, American singer, songwriter (d. 2025)
- July 7 – Madeline Davis, American LGBT activist and historian (d. 2021)
- July 10
  - Gene Alley, American baseball player
  - Helen Donath, American soprano
  - Julie Payne, American actress (d. 2019)
- July 13 – Paul Prudhomme, Louisiana Creole cuisine American chef (d. 2015)
- July 15 – Johnny Seay, American country music singer (d. 2016)
- July 16
  - Jim Cadile, American professional football offensive guard
  - Tom Metcalf, American baseball pitcher
- July 17 – Verne Lundquist, American sportscaster
- July 18
  - James Brolin, American actor, director
  - Joe Torre, American baseball player, manager
- July 21 – Jim Clyburn, African-American politician
- July 23
  - Don Imus, American radio personality (d. 2019)
  - John Nichols, American novelist (d. 2023)
- July 24
  - Stanley Hauerwas, American theologian
  - Dan Hedaya, American actor
- July 26
  - Dobie Gray, African-American singer-songwriter (Drift Away) (d. 2011)
  - Mary Jo Kopechne, American aide to Ted Kennedy (d. 1969)
- July 27 – Gary Kurtz, American filmmaker (d. 2018)
- July 28 – Philip Proctor, American actor
- July 29 – Bernard Lafayette, African-American civil rights activist (d. 2026)
- July 30 – Pat Schroeder, American politician (d. 2023)
- July 31 – Stanley R. Jaffe, American film producer (d. 2025)

=== August ===
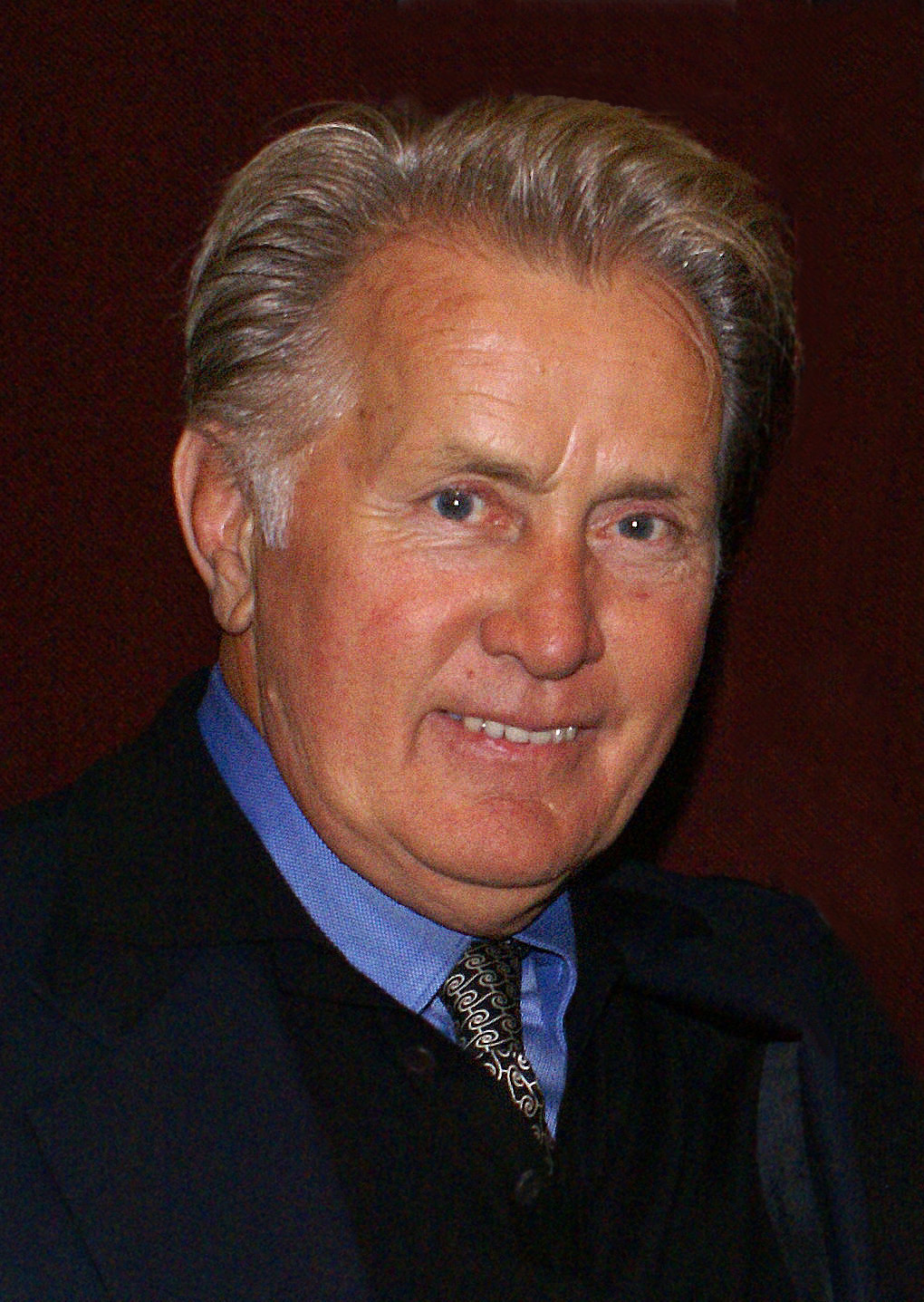
Martin Sheen

- August 3 – Martin Sheen, actor
- August 5 – Roman Gabriel, football player, coach, and actor (d. 2024)
- August 7 – Thomas Barlow, politician (d. 2017)
- August 10 – Bobby Hatfield, singer (The Righteous Brothers) (d. 2003)
- August 13 – Tony Cloninger, baseball player (d. 2018)
- August 14 – Galen Hall, American football coach
- August 19 – Jill St. John, actress
- August 20 – Rubén Hinojosa, politician
- August 22 – Bill McCartney, American football player and coach, founded Promise Keepers (d. 2025)
- August 23 – Thomas A. Steitz, biochemist (d. 2018)
- August 27 – Fernest Arceneaux, Zydeco accordionist (d. 2008)
- August 28 – William Cohen, politician
- August 29
  - James Brady, politician, 17th White House Press Secretary (d. 2014)
  - Bennie Maupin, musician
  - Johnny Paris, musician (Johnny and the Hurricanes) (d. 2006)
- August 31 – Wilton Felder, African American jazz saxophonist (d. 2015)

=== September ===
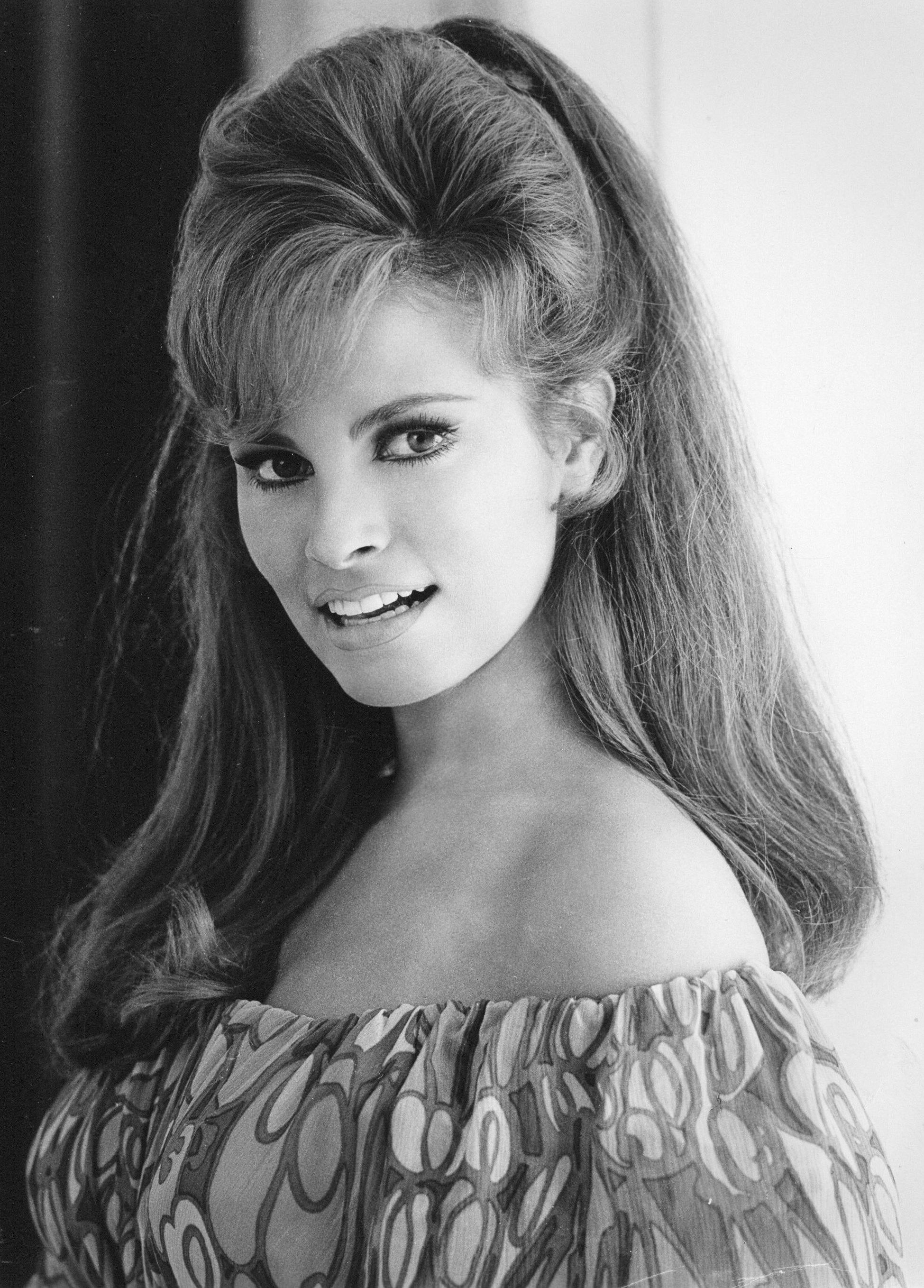
Raquel Welch

- September 3 – Joseph C. Strasser, American admiral (d. 2019)
- September 5 – Raquel Welch, American actress (d. 2023)
- September 10 – David Mann, American artist (d. 2004)
- September 11
  - Brian De Palma, American film director
  - Thomas K. McCraw, historian and author (d. 2012)
  - Theodore Olson, lawyer and politician, United States Solicitor General (d. 2024)
  - Robert Palmer, businessman, co-founded Mostek
- September 12
  - Peggy Caserta, American businesswoman and memoirist (d. 2024)
  - Linda Gray, American model and screen actress
  - Skip Hinnant, American film actor and comedian
  - Mickey Lolich, American baseball player (d. 2026)
  - Stephen Solarz, American academic and politician (d. 2010)
- September 14 – Larry Brown, American basketball player and coach
- September 15 – Merlin Olsen, American football player, announcer and actor (d. 2010)
- September 18 – Frankie Avalon, American pop singer and actor
- September 22 – Mike Schuler, American basketball coach (d. 2022)
- September 23 – Leonard Lopate, American radio personality (d. 2025)

=== October ===
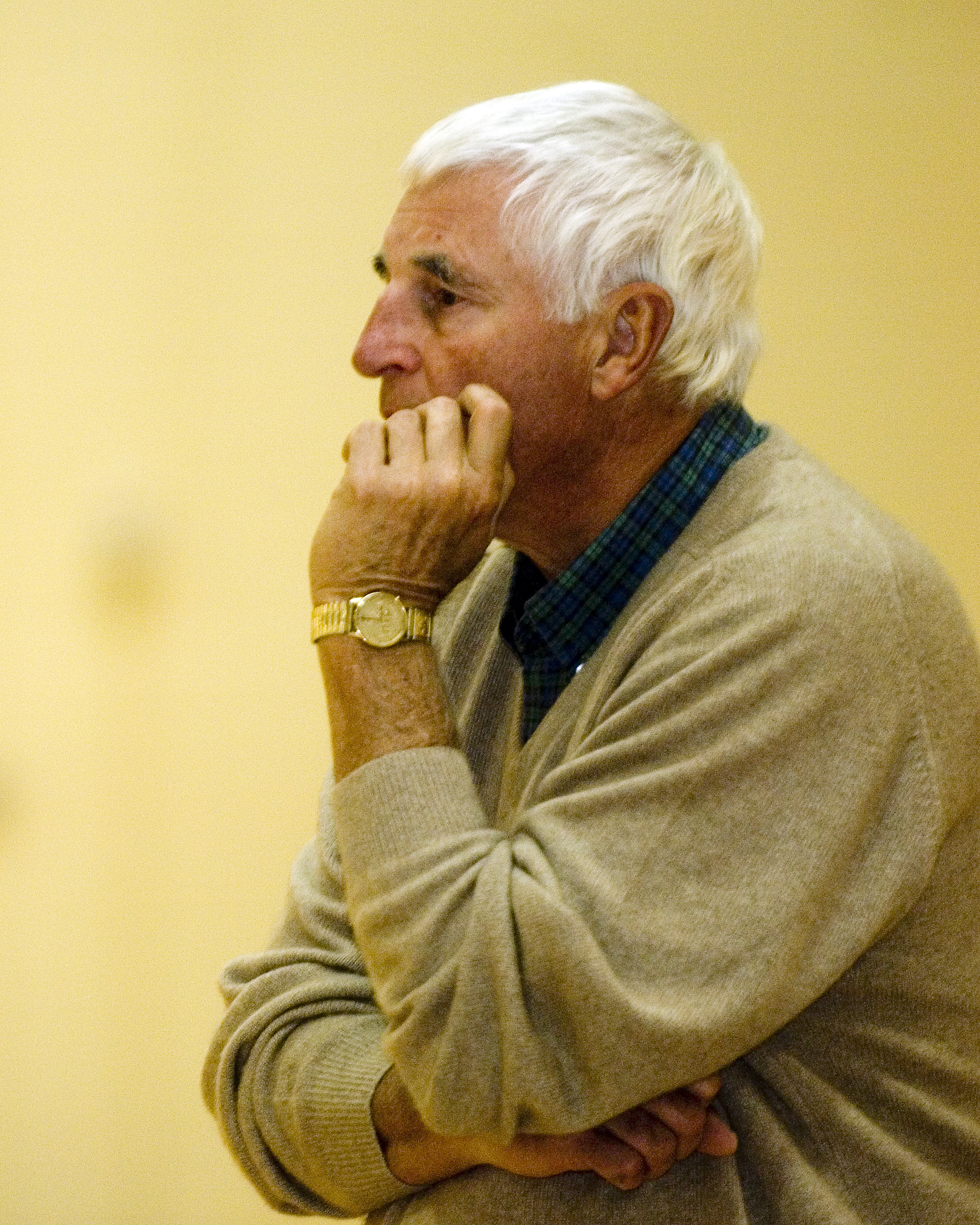
Bob Knight

- October 3
  - Alan O'Day, American singer, songwriter (d. 2013)
  - Mike Troy, American swimmer (d. 2019)
- October 6
  - Wyche Fowler, American politician
  - John Warnock, American computer scientist and businessman (d. 2023)
- October 7 – Bruce Vento, American educator and politician (d. 2000)
- October 9
  - Gordon J. Humphrey, American politician
  - Joe Pepitone, American baseball player and coach (d. 2023)
- October 13 – Pharoah Sanders, American saxophonist (d. 2022)
- October 16
  - Barry Corbin, American actor
  - Dave DeBusschere, American basketball player and coach, baseball player (d. 2003)
- October 17 – Stephen Kovacevich, American pianist (d. 2026 in the United Kingdom)
- October 18 – Cynthia Weil, American songwriter (d. 2023)
- October 20 – Robert Pinsky, American poet, essayist, literary critic and translator
- October 25 – Bob Knight, American basketball player and coach (d. 2023)
- October 27 – John Gotti, American gangster (d. 2002)
- October 29 – Connie Mack III, American politician

=== November ===
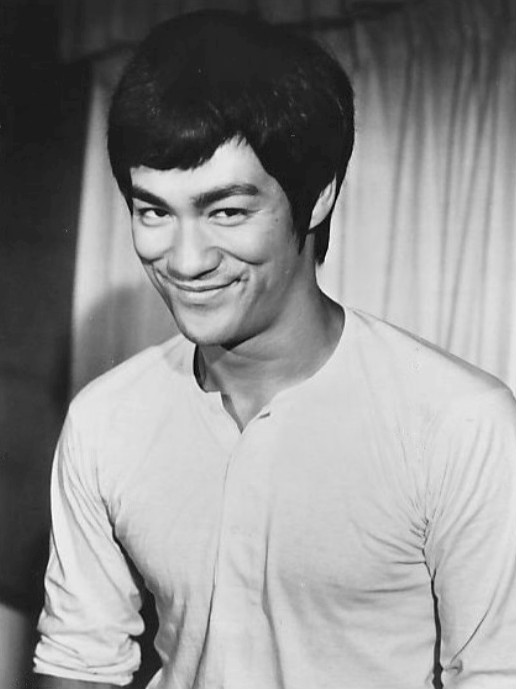
Bruce Lee

- November 1 – Richard Corben, American illustrator and comic book artist (d. 2020)
- November 2 – Ed Budde, American football player (d. 2023)
- November 6 – Jack Ong, American actor (d. 2017)
- November 11 – Barbara Boxer, American politician
- November 12 – Donald Wuerl, American cardinal archbishop
- November 15 – Sam Waterston, American actor
- November 21
  - Morris Chapman, American Baptist pastor (d. 2025)
  - Richard Marcinko, U.S. Navy SEAL team member, author
- November 22 – Terry Gilliam, American-born British screenwriter, director and animator
- November 23
  - Frazier Glenn Miller Jr., American domestic terrorist (d. 2021)
  - Rockin' Robin Roberts, American rock and roll singer (d. 1967)
- November 24 – Paul Tagliabue, American lawyer and commissioner of the NFL (d. 2025)
- November 25
  - Joe Gibbs, American football coach and NASCAR Xfinity Series team owner
  - Percy Sledge, African-American singer (d. 2015)
- November 27 – Bruce Lee, Chinese-American martial artist, actor (d. 1973)
- November 29 – Chuck Mangione, American flugelhorn player (d. 2025)
- November 30 – Kevin Phillips, American political commentator (d. 2023)

=== December ===
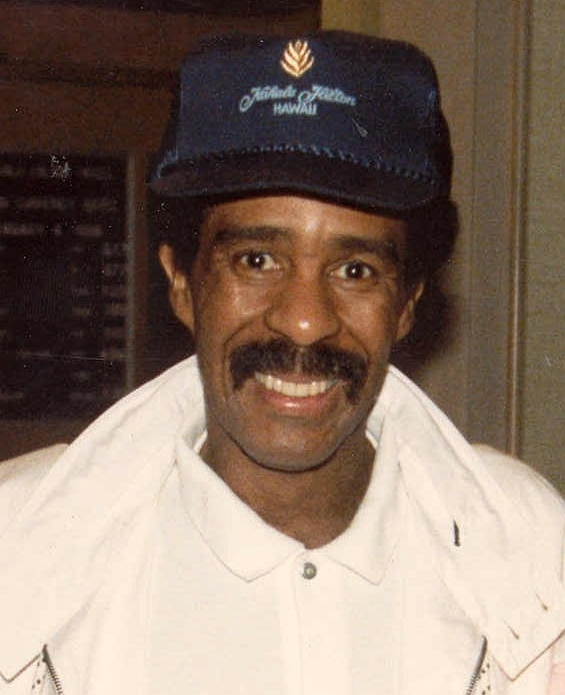
Richard Pryor

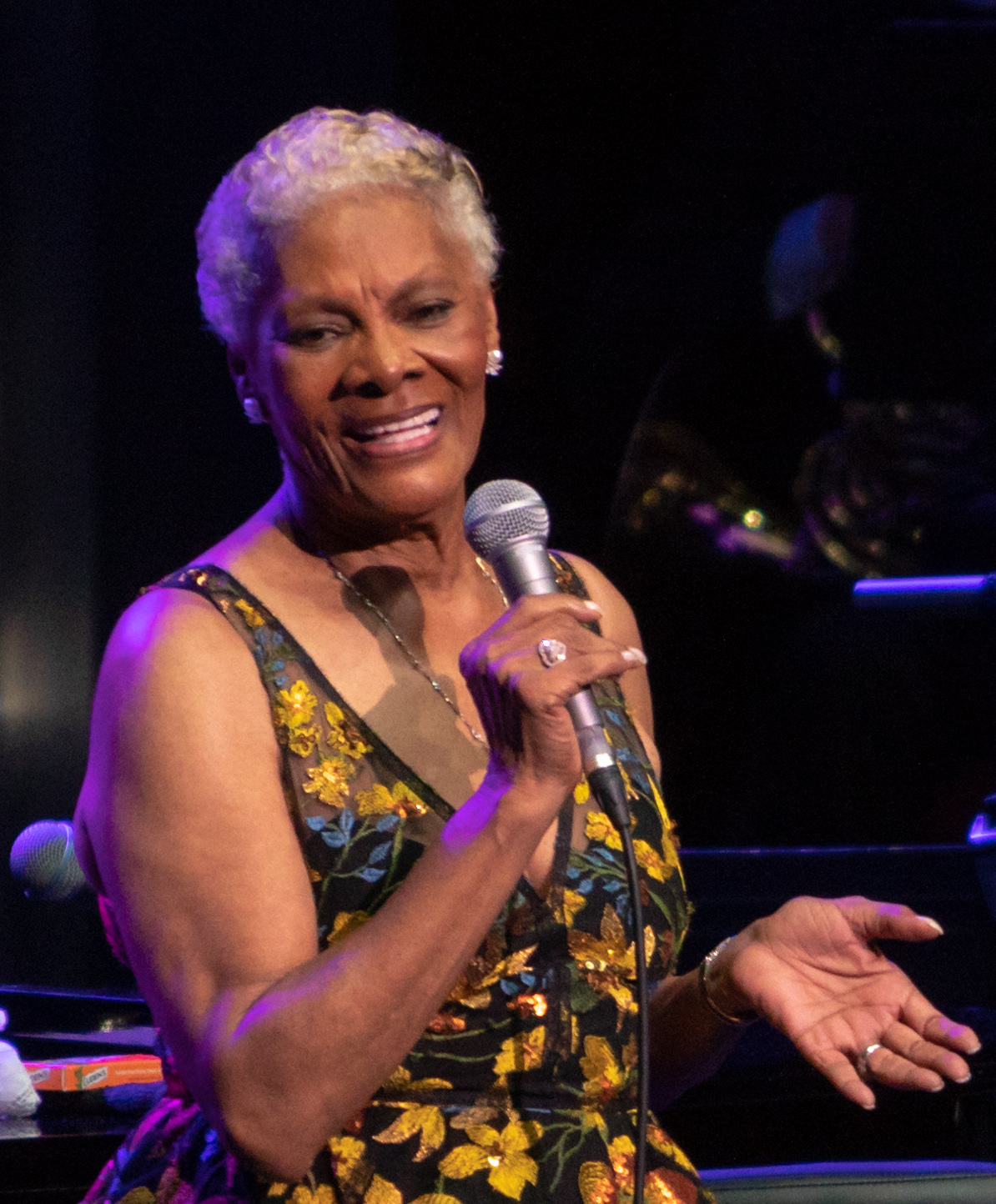
Dionne Warwick

- December 1 – Richard Pryor, African-American actor, comedian (d. 2005)
- December 2 – Connie Booth, American writer and actress
- December 3 – Jeffrey R. Holland, American educator and religious leader (d. 2025)
- December 4 – Gary Gilmore, American murderer (d. 1977)
- December 7 – Carole Simpson, American journalist
- December 8 – Raymond G. H. Seitz, American diplomat
- December 11
  - David Gates, American singer-songwriter
  - Donna Mills, American actress
- December 12
  - Tom Brown, American sportsman (d. 2025)
  - Shirley Englehorn, American golfer (d. 2022)
  - Dionne Warwick, African-American singer and actress
- December 19 – Phil Ochs, American singer and songwriter (d. 1976)
- December 21
  - Kelly Cherry, American poet and author
  - Frank Zappa, American musician, songwriter, composer, guitarist, record producer, actor and filmmaker (d. 1993)
- December 23 – Jorma Kaukonen, American musician (Jefferson Airplane)
- December 24
  - Janet Carroll, American actress, singer (d. 2012)
  - Anthony Fauci, American Immunologist
- December 26 – Edward C. Prescott, American economist, Nobel Prize laureate
- December 29 – Fred Hansen, American Olympic athlete
- December 31 – Tim Considine, American actor (d. 2022)

== Deaths ==
=== January–June ===
- January 4 – Flora Finch, silent film actress and comedian (born 1869 in the United Kingdom)
- January 19 – William Borah, U.S. Senator from Idaho from 1907 to 1940 (born 1865)
- January 20 – Omar Bundy, U.S. Army General (born 1861)
- January – Matilda McCrear, last survivor of the transatlantic slave trade in the U.S. (born c. 1857 in Yorubaland)
- February 1 – Philip Francis Nowlan, science fiction writer, creator of Buck Rogers (born 1888)
- February 4 – Samuel M. Vauclain, steam locomotive engineer (born 1856)
- February 9 – William Edward Dodd, diplomat and historian (born 1869)
- February 11 – Ellen Day Hale, painter and printmaker (born 1855)
- March 4 – Hamlin Garland, writer (born 1860)
- March 7 – Edwin Markham, poet (born 1852)
- March 11 – John Monk Saunders, screenwriter (born 1897)
- March 27 – Madeleine Talmage (Force) Astor Dick Fiermonte, socialite, survivor of the sinking of the Titanic, widow of John Jacob Astor IV (born 1893)
- April 8 – David C. Shanks, army officer (born 1861)
- April 26 – Henry Ossian Flipper, first Black graduate of the United States Military Academy (born 1856)
- April 29 – Edgar Buckingham, physicist and soil scientist (born 1867)
- May 28 – Walter Connolly, film character actor (born 1887)
- May 29 – Mary Anderson, stage actress (born 1859)
- June 7
  - James Hall, film actor (born 1900)
  - Hugh Rodman, U.S. Navy admiral (born 1859)
- June 11 – Alfred S. Alschuler, Chicago architect (born 1876)
- June 13 – George Fitzmaurice, film director (born 1885 in France)
- June 14 – Henry W. Antheil Jr., diplomat, killed in shootdown of airplane Kaleva (born 1912)
- June 20 – Charley Chase, comedian (born 1893)
- June 21 – John T. Thompson, U.S. Army officer, inventor of the Thompson submachine gun (born 1860)

=== July–December ===
- July 1 – Ben Turpin, comic silent film actor (born 1869)
- July 15 – Robert Wadlow, tallest man ever (born 1918)
- July 30 – Spencer S. Wood, U.S. Navy rear admiral (born 1861)
- August 5 – Frederick Cook, explorer (born 1865)
- August 8 – Johnny Dodds, jazz clarinetist (born 1892)
- August 18 – Walter Chrysler, automobile pioneer (born 1875)
- August 21 – Ernest Thayer, writer, comic poet (born 1863)
- August 22 – Mary Vaux Walcott, botanical artist (born 1860)
- August 28 – William Bowie, geodetic engineer (born 1872)
- August 31 – Ernest Lundeen, lawyer and politician (born 1878)
- September 1 – Lillian Wald, nurse and humanitarian (born 1867)
- September 2 – Eddie Collins, vaudeville-veteran comic (born 1883)
- September 6 – Leonor F. Loree, civil engineer and railroad executive (born 1858)
- September 23 – Hale Holden, president of Chicago, Burlington and Quincy Railroad (born 1869)
- September 25 – Marguerite Clark, stage and silent film actress (born 1883)
- September 28 – Earl Hurd, animator, film director and comics artist (born 1880)
- October 5 – Ballington Booth, co-founder of Volunteers of America (born 1857)
- October 11 – Charles Stanton Ogle, actor (born 1865)
- October 12 – Tom Mix, Western film actor (born 1880)
- October 17 – George Davis, baseball player (born 1870)
- November 5 – Otto Plath, entomologist, father of poet Sylvia Plath (born 1885 in Germany)
- November 9 – John Henry Kirby, Texas legislator and businessman (born 1860)
- November 17
  - Ralph W. Barnes, journalist (born 1899)
  - Raymond Pearl, biologist (born 1879)
- November 18 – Sylvia Ashton, silent film actress (born 1880)
- December 10 – William V. Mong, film actor, screenwriter and director (born 1875)
- December 15 – Billy Hamilton, baseball player (born 1866)
- December 21 – F. Scott Fitzgerald, fiction writer (born 1896)
- December 22 – Nathanael West, fiction writer, in automobile accident (born 1903)
- December 23 – Eddie August Schneider, aviator, in airplane crash (born 1911)
- December 25 – Agnes Ayres, silent film actress (born 1891)
- December 26 – Daniel Frohman, theater producer (born 1851)
- December 27 – Ella Rhoads Higginson, poet (born 1862)
- December 30 – C. Harold Wills, automobile engineer and businessman (born 1878)
- December 31 – Roberta Lawson, Indigenous American (Lenape) activist and musician (born 1878)

== See also ==
- List of American films of 1940
- Timeline of United States history (1930–1949)
