= James Maynard =

James Maynard may refer to:

- James A. Maynard (born 1987), English mathematician
- James H. Maynard (born 1940), American entrepreneur
- James Mortimer Maynard, businessman and politician of the Cape Colony
- Buster Maynard (James Walter Maynard), American baseball player
