= Golden Corral =

American chain of restaurants

- A Golden Corral location in Tallahassee, Florida.
- Type: Private
- Industry: Restaurant Franchising
- Founded: January 3, 1973; 53 years ago Fayetteville, North Carolina, U.S.
- Founders: James Maynard; William F. Carl
- Headquarters: Raleigh, North Carolina, U.S.
- Number of locations: 399 (2025)
- Key people: Easter Maynard, Board Chair; Lance Trenary, President & CEO
- Revenue: $1.6 billion (2024)
- Number of employees: 35,000
- Website: goldencorral.com

Golden Corral is an American all-you-can-eat buffet and grill chain. It is a privately held company headquartered in the U.S. city of Raleigh, North Carolina, with locations in 43 U.S. states and Puerto Rico.

== History ==
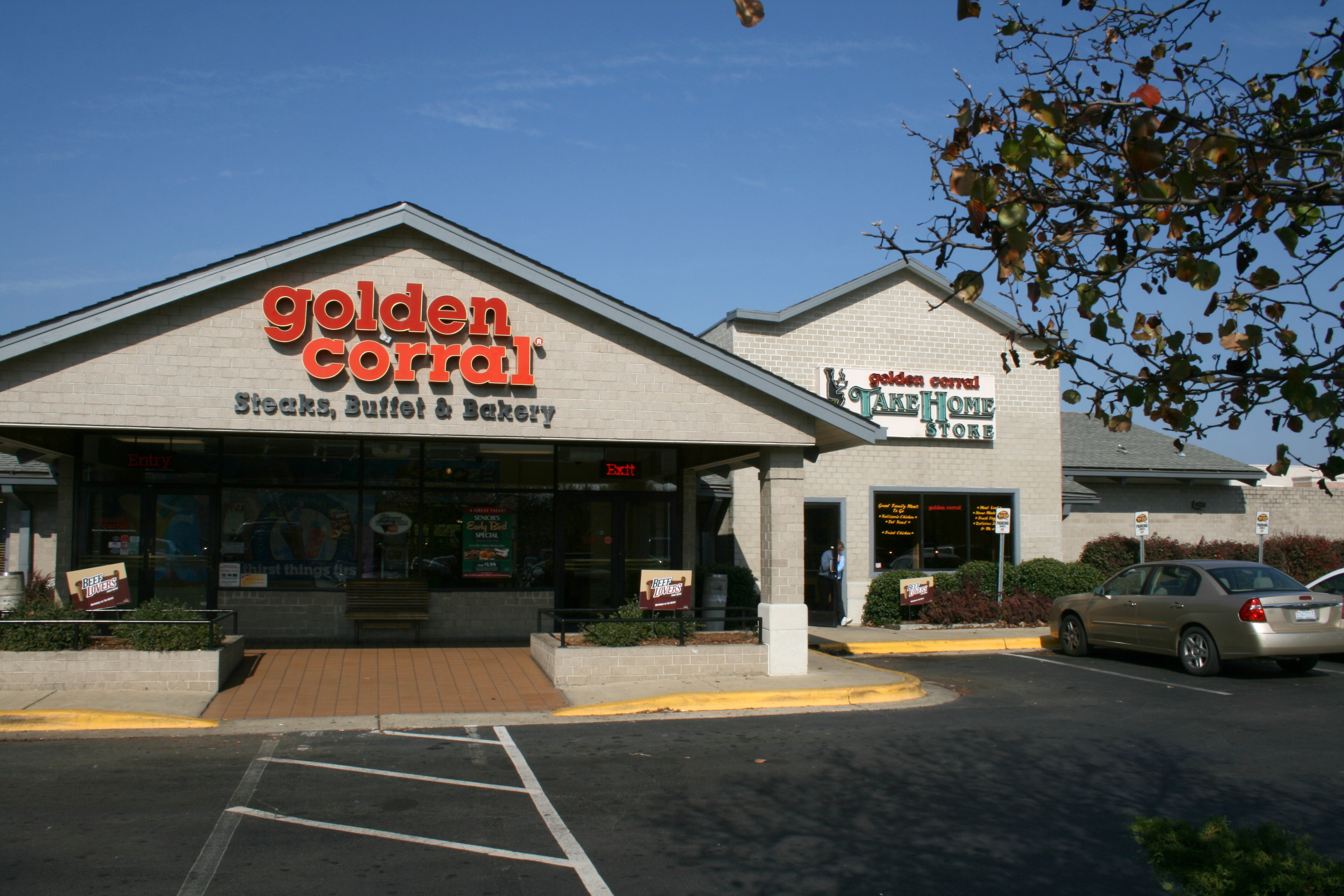
Golden Corral in Durham, North Carolina, in 2008 (now closed and demolished)

In 1971, James Maynard and William F. Carl conceived the idea that became Golden Corral after several unsuccessful attempts to acquire a franchise with other companies. Golden Corral was incorporated in 1972 and the first Golden Corral Family Steak House opened on January 3, 1973, in Fayetteville, North Carolina.

The company has since expanded to nearly 500 locations across the United States; about 100 of them are company-owned. The others are franchised stores. As of 2007, gross sales were over $1.53 billion.

The company had more than 500 restaurants by 1987. That year, they decided to begin franchising by licensing 55 distressed restaurants to their most successful general managers. Because of poor training, nationwide concerns about the consumption of red meat, and a shift in market shares to upscale restaurants, sales were falling. The company added salad bars to all of its locations, sacrificed seating in most and in others sacrificed part of the parking lot to make additions to the buildings.

In 1991, the first seven "Metro Market" concept restaurants opened. They were 10,000 square feet (930 m^{2}) and seated between 400 and 450 customers. These new Golden Corral restaurants more than doubled the size of the old, which were typically 5,000 square feet (460 m^{2}) with a capacity of 175 people. There was the addition of the Brass Bell Bakery, named for the brass bell which rang every 15 minutes to signal that fresh bread, rolls, and pastries were coming out of the oven. An expanded buffet, dubbed the Golden Choice Buffet, was also added, which had a new layout to showcase its items. The location of these new restaurants, the majority of which were in Texas, Oklahoma, New Mexico and North Carolina, was also a change for the company, moving away from small towns and into metropolitan areas. In 2001, system-wide annual sales exceeded $1 billion for the first time. As of 2021, there were nearly 500 restaurants in 43 states covering most regions of the country aside from: Oregon (no locations), Hawaii (no locations), New England (only three restaurants—Springfield, Massachusetts, New Haven, Connecticut, and Manchester, New Hampshire), the New York City Metropolitan Areas (only one in the Bronx) and the low population states of Delaware and Wyoming. In some other larger metropolitan areas, such as the San Francisco Bay Area (only one location, in Concord to the northeast), Philadelphia, Washington, and New Orleans, there are only locations in the far-flung suburbs. The first Puerto Rico location opened on October 25, 2020, in Canóvanas with plans to open more locations throughout the island.

In late 1993, VICORP acquired the right to a small Florida chain called Angel's Diner. They acquired this from Eric A. Holm; he had also sold the rights to Golden Corral and VICORP was forced to pay Golden Corral $1M to secure the exclusive rights. The intent was to convert underperforming Village Inn and Bakers Square units to this new concept. After building seven units, VICORP realized that the concept was not economically viable and wrote off $11M on the venture. During this time frame, Eric A. Holm filed for personal bankruptcy.

The company updated their restaurants to a concept, called "Strata", during the mid-2000s in an effort to bring more of the food preparation into view of the guests. In all locations, guests serve themselves, including requesting made-to-order items such as Belgian waffles, omelets and char-broiled steaks.

The most recent designed restaurants are known as the "Gateway" style rolled out late 2018. These locations were created in the hopes of offering a more contemporary appearance for the interior and exterior of the building, with different layouts for the dining room, adding new food service bars and kitchen areas.

Many locations offer "GC on the go" services, as well as delivery partnerships with companies like Grubhub, Uber Eats and DoorDash. GC on the go allows customers to pack anything they want into a takeout container and then pay for it by the pound. Many restaurants also offer reserved parking.

During the COVID-19 pandemic in early 2020, the chain had to temporarily close down most of its locations just like other restaurants in response to the directives for the prevention of COVID-19 that spread across the globe. In order for the chain to sustain its business and to ensure the safety of its guests, some of the chain's locations were reopened offering cafeteria-style dining and family-style service. Others were permanently closed.

In October 2020, one of its largest franchise operators filed for Chapter 11 bankruptcy protection and had plans to cancel at least six out of 33 leases.

=== Camp Corral ===
Golden Corral sponsors Camp Corral, a one-week summer camp program at various camps around the country for children of wounded, disabled or fallen military service members. Camp Corral has served over 17,000 military kids between the ages of 8 and 15, with 24 camp locations in 19 states. Golden Corral raised over $1.8 million for Camp Corral in 2018 alone.

=== Internet domain ===
In January 2002, the National Arbitration Forum ordered that the domain "www.goldencorralrest.com" be transferred to Golden Corral from an unapproved domain service based in Russia.

== Controversies ==
=== 2003 salmonella outbreak ===
In 2003, an outbreak of salmonella was linked to a Golden Corral restaurant in Kennesaw, Georgia and a total of 23 people were affected by the outbreak. The salmonella bacteria was found in a floor drain, leading health inspectors to believe that it had been washed from equipment earlier. No original source was found.

Similar outbreaks occurred in Wyoming (a location now closed) and Orlando, Florida in late 2012.

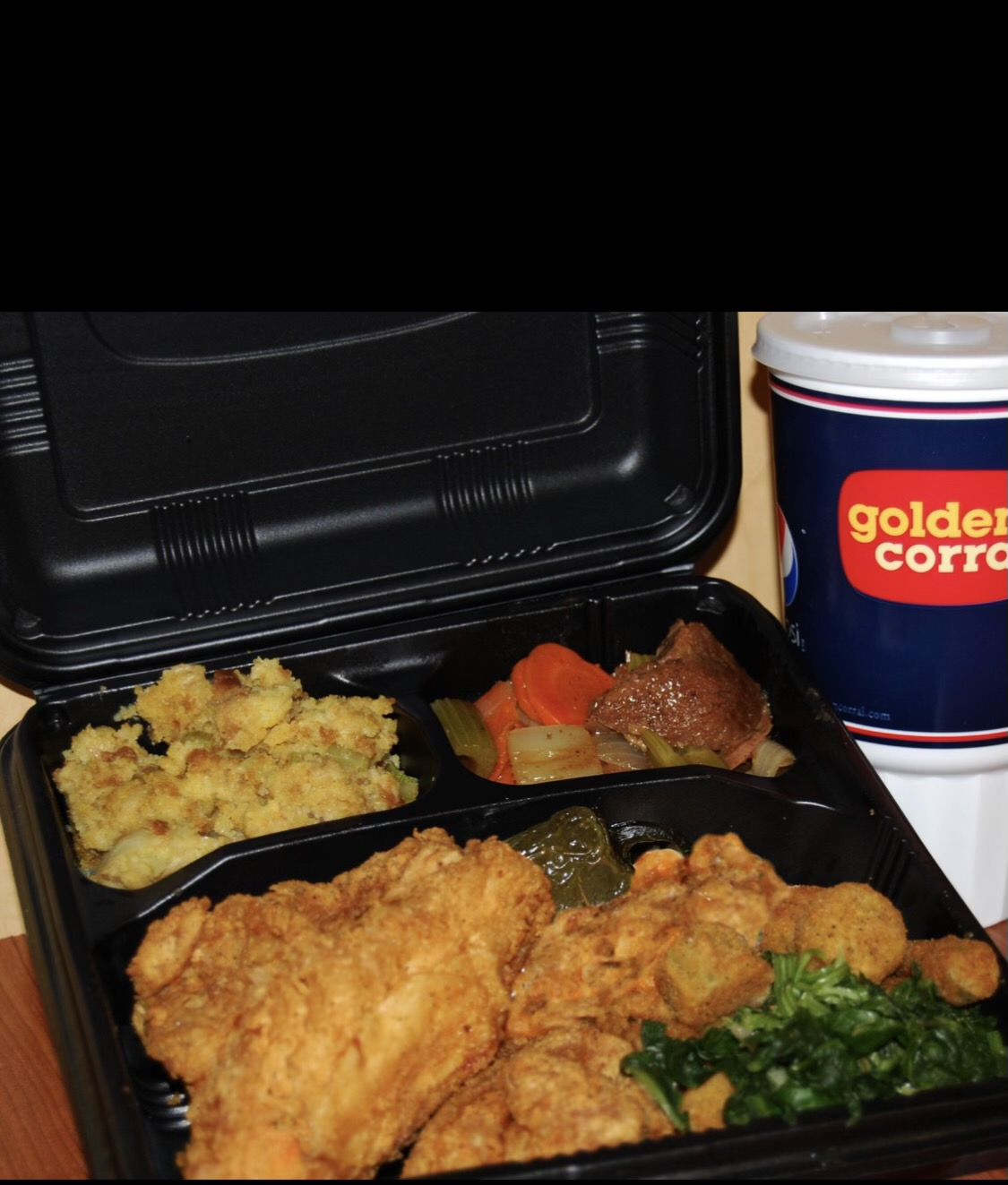
Golden Corral to-go box, used during the COVID-19 pandemic

=== 2012 norovirus outbreak ===
In 2012, an outbreak of norovirus was linked to a now closed Golden Corral restaurant in Casper, Wyoming. Over 344 illnesses, with 282 primary cases, were reported by the Wyoming state epidemiologist. The virus got a push from 31 sickened food handlers at the restaurant who mostly kept working their normal shifts.

=== Allegations of improper food storage ===
On July 1, 2013, a YouTube video was uploaded alleging that during a health inspection, the Port Orange, Florida, Golden Corral location, owned by Eric A. Holm, was improperly storing prepared and raw food next to their dumpster. Employee Brandon Huber was given a six-month paid leave after filming and uploading the video to YouTube. Items included, among other things: pot roast, gravy, hamburger patties and raw baby back ribs. These items were still on their prep trays and bins, as well as on a speed rack. The employee in the video alleges that this is a common practice for the restaurant and insinuated that the food was to be served later that day. On July 8, 2013, Golden Corral posted a response on YouTube, saying that the food was never served to the customers, the employee in the video was trying to make money from the video and the manager of the location had been fired. The CEO of Golden Corral stated that he would fully investigate the incident and that the employee would not be terminated.

=== 2022 Bensalem Brawl ===
In January 2022, a large-scale brawl involving over 40 individuals broke out at the Golden Corral in Bensalem, Pennsylvania, triggered by a misunderstanding over a piece of steak. Video footage showed patrons throwing chairs and tables, causing minor injuries and significant damage to the dining area, with employees attempting to intervene. Bensalem police responded, and two brothers were charged with disorderly conduct for their actions post-fight, though no arrests were made for the brawl itself. The restaurant temporarily closed for cleanup and repairs, and management faced scrutiny for inadequate security measures.

== See also ==
- List of buffet restaurants
