= James H. Maynard =

American businessman

James Maynard
- Born: February 14, 1940 (age 86); Jacksonville, North Carolina, U.S.
- Education: East Carolina University
- Occupation: Entrepreneur

James H. Maynard (born February 14, 1940) is an American entrepreneur and is the Chairman & CEO of the Investors Management Corporation, a holding company for food service and service industries, the largest of which is Golden Corral Corporation.

Maynard was born in Jacksonville, North Carolina. He graduated from East Carolina University in 1965 with a degree in economics and psychology.

Maynard sold computers for Burroughs Corporation in West Palm Beach, Florida. Around 1970, he began working with salesman William F. Carl on conceiving a food business, considering pizza and doughnuts, before settling on steaks. They opened the first Golden Corral restaurant in Fayetteville in 1973. By the end of 1973, they had two restaurants and by the end of 1976, they had nine restaurants. He organized Investors Management Corporation and developed the Golden Corral Family Steak House restaurant chain and other IMC subsidiaries. Maynard is now the owner or franchisor of approximately 500 restaurants nationwide with sales in excess of $1.3 billion.

On May 17, 2011, Maynard and his wife Connie donated $10.5 million to the children's hospital at Vidant Medical Center. $9 million went to the children's hospital itself, while $1.5 million funded a distinguished professorship in the Department of Pediatrics within the Brody School of Medicine at East Carolina University. The name of the hospital is called James and Connie Maynard Children's Hospital.

== Bibliography ==
- "Maynard's Midas Touch" East magazine (East Carolina University), Winter 2006 edition
- "James Maynard" SMEI (Sales & Marketing Executives International, Inc.) Academy of Achievement
- Golden Corral Corporation Company Profile - Yahoo! Finance
