= New Jersey in the 19th century =

New Jersey in the nineteenth century led the United States into the Industrial Revolution. The state sent soldiers, supplies and money to the wars of the period but was not the location of any battles.

== Population ==
Historical population
Census	Pop.	Note	%±
1800	211,149		—
1810	245,562		16.3%
1820	277,575		13.0%
1830	320,823		15.6%
1840	373,306		16.4%
1850	489,555		31.1%
1860	672,035		37.3%
1870	906,096		34.8%
1880	1,131,116		24.8%
1890	1,444,933		27.7%
1900	1,883,669		30.4%

Population growth was steady across the state, and especially grew rapidly after 1840s when the cities began building up. furthermore after the 1840s, a steady flow of immigration from Europe, especially Germany, Ireland and Britain, gave a more cosmopolitan aura to urban areas. Rural areas prospered by the nearby presence of two rapidly growing metropolitan centers in New York City and Philadelphia which purchased more and better foods as farmers modernized their techniques and made heavy use of railways.

Augmented by new immigration from the Netherlands, the long-established Dutch areas grew and modernized especially in the Passaic Valley. Some remained in farming, but many others moved into textiles, construction, food industries and the professions.

== Religion ==
John Fea has explored the links between agrarianism, republican politics, and Presbyterian moral thought in New Jersey in the 1790-1820 period. Devout Presbyterians admired Jeffersonian democracy, especially Jefferson's emphasis on the virtuous farmer and their own devout belief that they were the chosen people of God.

Princeton University, known as the College of New Jersey until 1896, was the intellectual center of the Presbyterian movement in the United States together with its neighboring Princeton Theological Seminary. The outstanding theologian was Charles Hodge (1797–1878) who spent his career at the Seminary and was the founder and editor for 45 years of the Biblical Repertory, later named the Princeton Review. He favored the Old School position, which was favorable toward ritual and hostile to revivalism. However he worked hard to prevent a schism in the church, as he held church unity to be more important than the particular factional beliefs. He also sought to hold the Presbyterian Church aloof from sectional strife regarding the expansion of slavery that led to the Civil War, though he insisted that the church must bear witness to Christian themes on political issues.

== Constitution ==
The second version of the New Jersey State Constitution was written in 1844. The constitution provided the right of suffrage only to white males, removing it from women and non-white men. The right of suffrage had previously been awarded to those groups under the Original New Jersey State Constitution of 1776. Some of the important components of the second State Constitution include the separation of the powers of the executive, legislative, and judicial branches. The new constitution also provided a bill of rights. Under the same constitution, the people had the right to elect the governor.

== Industrial Revolution ==
The economy of New Jersey was largely based on agriculture. However, crop failures and other agricultural problems plagued the settlers of New Jersey. Soil was becoming less fertile and worn out. However, New Jersey eventually funded an extensive effort that led to publication in the early 1850s of accurate agriculture-related surveys. Largely through the effort of George Hammell Cook, the publication of this survey helps to increase the state's involvement in agricultural research and direct support to farmers. As agriculture became a less reliable source of income for New Jerseyans, many began turning towards more industrialized methods. Many immigrants increased the population of New Jersey greatly. Most of them came from Germany, Wales, and Ireland.

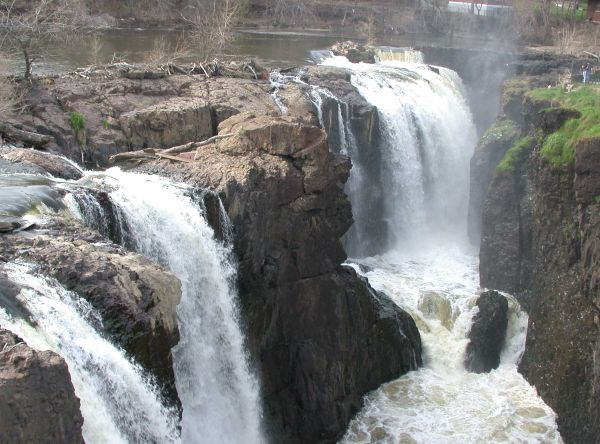
The Great Falls of the Passaic River

Paterson, New Jersey, a city founded by the Society for the Establishment of Useful Manufactures (SUM), was a leader in America's Industrial Revolution, harnessing energy from the 77-foot (23 m) high Great Falls of the Passaic River. The city became an important site for mills and other industries, including textiles, firearms, silk, and railroad locomotive manufacturing. As a result of its high silk production, it became nicknamed the "Silk City". In 1835, Samuel Colt began producing firearms in the city.

Thomas Edison, famous inventor, was born in 1847. He was called "the Wizard of Menlo Park" for his amazing inventions and improvements to other ideas. Over the course of his entire life, he was granted 1,093 patents. He worked in Menlo Park. Of his most famous contributions included his design of the incandescent light bulb, the phonograph, the kinetoscope, the stock ticker, the telegraph, the Dictaphone, the radio, the tattoo gun, and the telephone. He started the Motion Picture Patents Company. One of his famous sayings was, "Genius is one percent inspiration and 99 percent perspiration".

=== Transportation ===
The agricultural products from New Jersey usually were transported to larger markets in New York City and Philadelphia. In order to make such transporting of crops more profitable, newer transportation methods were devised. The first oceangoing steamboat went from Hoboken, New Jersey, around the southern tip of New Jersey, and ended in Philadelphia. Later, systems of canals were also built, the first of which is called the Morris Canal and ran from Jersey City, New Jersey, on the Hudson River, to Phillipsburg, New Jersey on the Delaware River. The Delaware and Raritan canal ran from New Brunswick, New Jersey on the Raritan River, and ends at Bordentown, New Jersey on the Delaware River.

Locomotion was also improved. In the 1820s, Hoboken inventor John Stevens built a 10-ton locomotive in England and transported it to New Jersey. Since it was too heavy to run on regular wooden tracks, his son, also by the name of John, started constructing iron railroads. By 1833, the Camden & Amboy railroad had been completed, allowing a 7-hour passage between Philadelphia and New York City. Throughout the 1800s, over a dozen companies were operating railroad lines. By the end of the century the shores of the Hudson River were dominated by rail infrastructure including passenger terminals, ferries slips, and freight operations owned by several competing railroads.

== Second Party System: 1830s-1850s ==
Historians have examined the emergence of the Second Party System at the state local levels. For example, Bruce Bendler argues that in New Jersey the same dramatic changes that were reshaping the rest of the country were especially pointed in that state in the 1820s. A new political system emerged by the end of the decade as voters polarized in support or opposition to Jackson. By the 1830s pro-Jackson Democrats and anti-Jackson Whigs had mobilize practically every adult male voter into their opposing coalitions thereby integrating politics at the local state and national levels Furthermore, the "Market Revolution" was well underway, as industrialization and upgraded transportation networks made the larger picture more important than the local economy, and entrepreneurs and politicians became leaders in speeding up the changes. For example, William N. Jeffers of Salem County, New Jersey, built his political success on leadership with the Jacksonian forces at the local level, while at the same time building his fortune with a bank charter and building a steam mill.

== Wars of the nineteenth century ==
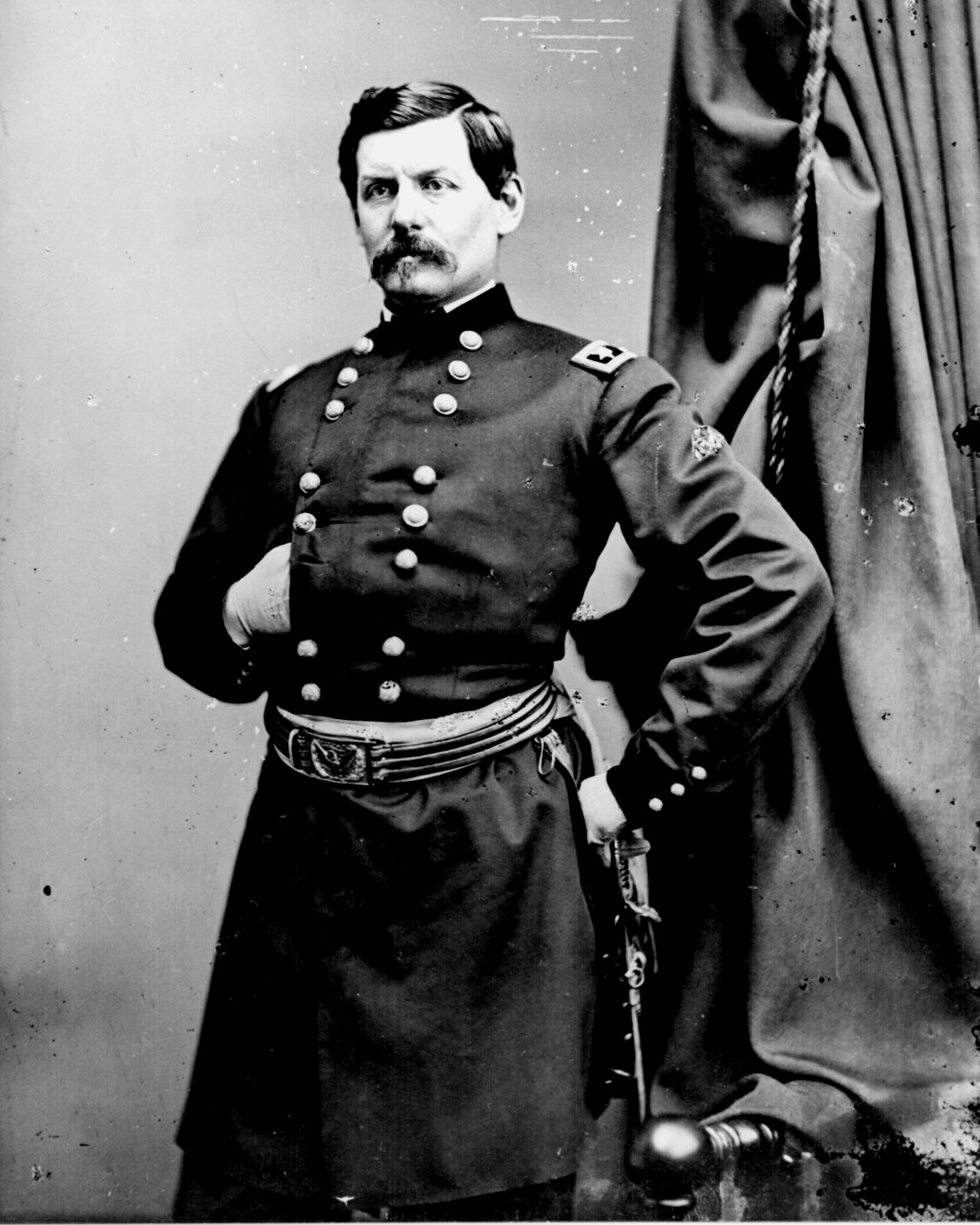
George B. McClellan

Though no major battles were fought in New Jersey, soldiers and volunteers from New Jersey played an important part in the wars fought by the United States of America. During the Mexican–American War, a battalion of volunteers from New Jersey, in four companies, was active from September 1847 to July 1848. Philip Kearny, an officer who led a cavalry unit, followed General Winfield Scott and fought in the Battle of Contreras and Battle of Churubusco. After the war, Kearny made his home in the state of New Jersey. George B. McClellan was an important general during the Civil War, and was elected governor of New Jersey in 1877, serving in office from 1878 to 1881.

=== Slavery and Civil War ===
The Quaker population of New Jersey was especially intolerant of slavery. However, New Jersey ended up becoming the last of the northern states to abolish slavery by enacting legislation which caused the slow abolishment of slavery. Though New Jersey passed an act for the gradual abolition of slavery in 1804, it wasn't until 1830 that most blacks were free in the state. However, by the close of the Civil War, about a dozen African-Americans in New Jersey were still apprenticed freedmen. New Jersey at first refused to ratify the Constitutional Amendments that banned slavery. New Jersey was a major part of the extensive Underground Railroad system.

No battles took place within New Jersey throughout the course of the Civil War. However, over 88,000 soldiers from New Jersey were part of several infantry and cavalry regiments. In total, 31 regiments were created by New Jersey soldiers during this war, along with four militia regiments, three cavalry regiments, and five batteries of light artillery. 23,116 of those soldiers served in the Army of the Potomac. Soldiers from New Jersey fought generally in the Eastern theater of the Civil War Over 6,000 soldiers from New Jersey were killed in the war. Philip Kearny, an officer from the Mexican–American War, led a brigade of New Jersey regiments under Brigadier General William B. Franklin. Kearny distinguished himself as a brilliant officer during the Peninsula Campaign, and was promoted to the position of major general.

New Jersey was one of the few states to vote for Stephen Douglas instead of Abraham Lincoln in the Presidential Election of 1860. The people of New Jersey also gave its electoral votes to George McClellan when he ran for president against Abraham Lincoln in the election of 1864, being the only free state that rejected Lincoln twice. McClellan later became the governor of New Jersey, from 1878 to 1881.

Many cities like Paterson, New Jersey and Camden, New Jersey grew extremely strong through the duration of the Civil War. They produced many necessities, including clothing and war materials like ammunition. These cities prospered through constant production even after the end of the war. Cities like those of Paterson and Camden became crucial to the Northern war effort. With the Union's ability to manufacture more supplies, the Union was able to defeat the Confederates and successfully conclude the war and reunite the country.

== See also ==
- Mercer Pottery Company
