= 1876 Missouri State Auditor election =

- November 7, 1876

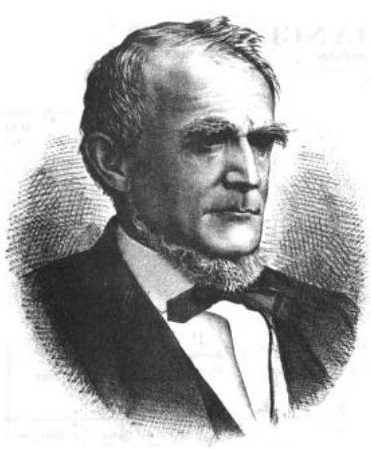
Nominee	Thomas Holloday	George Smith
Party	Democratic	Republican
Popular vote	202,875	145,773
Percentage	58.19%	41.81%
State Auditor before election
Thomas Holloday
Democratic
Elected State Auditor
Thomas Holloday
Democratic

The 1876 Missouri State Auditor election was held on November 7, 1876, in order to elect the state auditor of Missouri. Democratic nominee and incumbent state auditor Thomas Holloday defeated Republican nominee and former lieutenant governor George Smith.

== General election ==
On election day, November 7, 1876, Democratic nominee Thomas Holloday won re-election by a margin of 57,102 votes against his opponent Republican nominee George Smith, thereby retaining Democratic control over the office of state auditor. Holloday was sworn in for his second term on January 8, 1877.

=== Results ===
Missouri State Auditor election, 1876
Party	Candidate	Votes	%
Democratic	Thomas Holloday (incumbent)	202,875	58.19
Republican	George Smith	145,773	41.81
Total votes		348,648	100.00
Democratic hold			

== See also ==
- 1876 Missouri gubernatorial election
