= 24th Michigan Infantry Regiment =

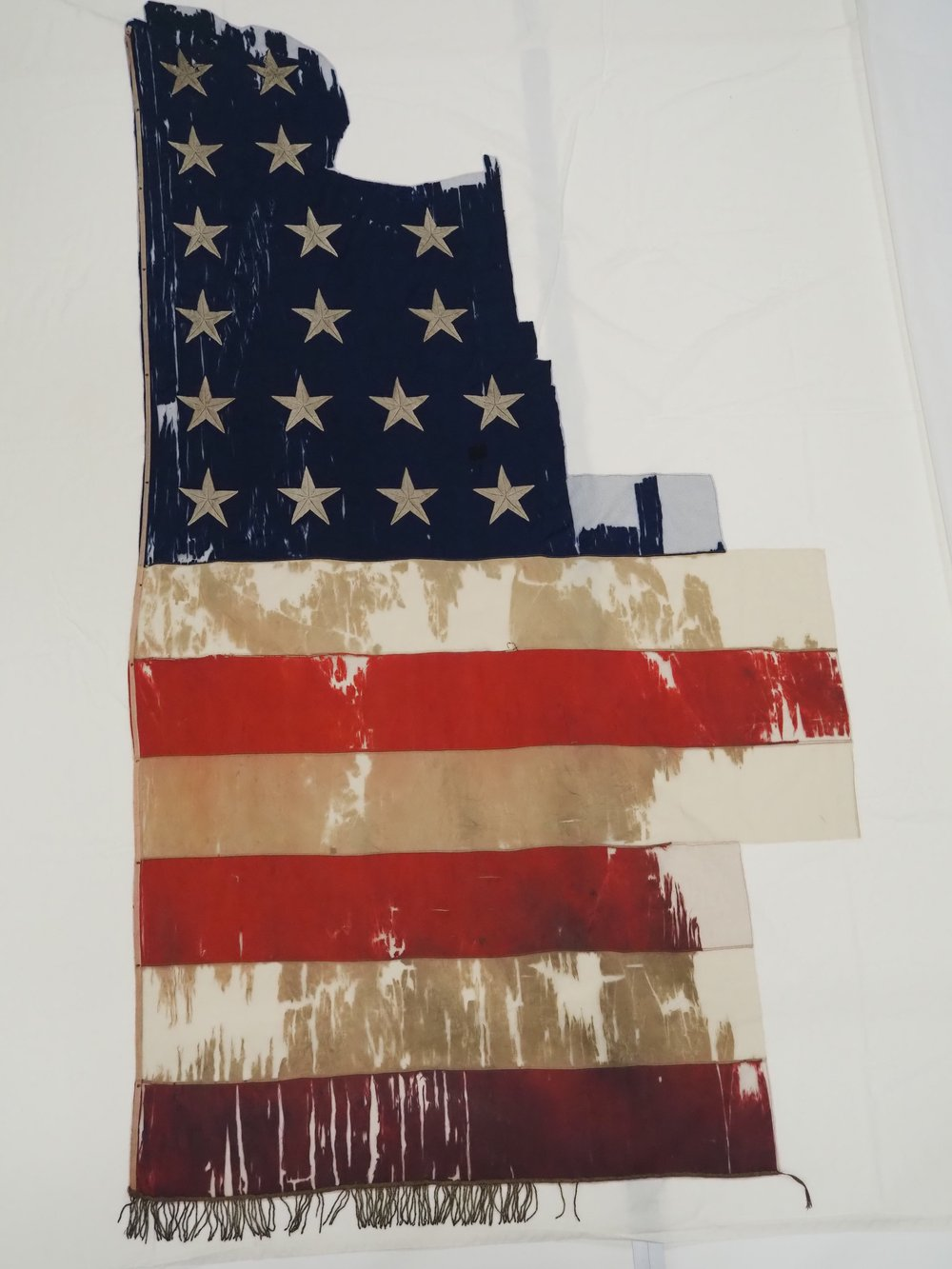
- The 24th Michigan's national color
- Active: August 15, 1862–June 30, 1865
- Country: United States
- Allegiance: Union
- Branch: Infantry
- Part of: 1st Brigade, 1st Division, I Corps, Army of the Potomac
- Engagements: American Civil War; Battle of Fredericksburg; Battle of Chancellorsville; Battle of Gettysburg; Battle of the Wilderness; Battle of Spotsylvania Court House; Battle of Cold Harbor; Siege of Petersburg

Commanders
- Colonel of the Regiment: Col. Henry Andrew Morrow

The 24th Michigan Infantry Regiment was an infantry regiment that served in the Union Army during the American Civil War. It was part of the Union Iron Brigade. It was chosen to be the honor guard for the Funeral of Abraham Lincoln.

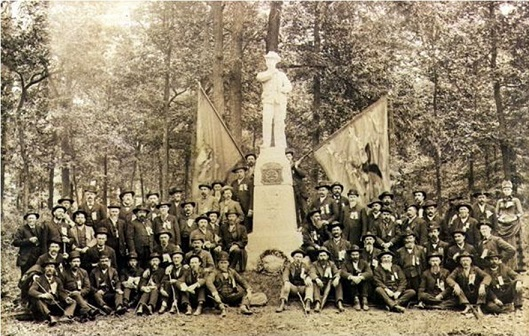
Survivors of the 24th Michigan Volunteer infantry at the dedication of their regimental monument during Michigan Day at Gettysburg in 1889. The monument is located in Herbst Woods at the Gettysburg National Military Park.

== Service ==
The 24th Michigan Infantry was organized at Detroit, Michigan and mustered into Federal service on August 15, 1862. It was assigned to the famous Iron Brigade in the Army of the Potomac. The brigade's commander General John Gibbon had requested a new regiment be added to his command because its four original regiments (the 2nd, 6th, and 7th Wisconsin and the 19th Indiana) had been severely depleted by combat action and numbered less than 1000 men total by October 1862. He said that ideally it should be a Western regiment since the others were from that part of the country. Gibbon's request granted, the 24th Michigan joined the brigade and saw its first action at Fredericksburg taking on a nuisance battery of Confederate horse artillery south of the town. The regiment would follow up its actions at Fredericksburg with a raid on Port Royal, Virginia and fighting at Fitzhugh Crossing. It would earn the Model 1858 Hardee Hat of the Iron Brigade in May, 1863.

The 24th saw no major action during the Chancellorsville campaign, but at Gettysburg it "Went into action with 496 officers and men. Killed & mortally wounded: 89; Otherwise wounded: 218; Captured: 56; Total casualties: 363. Nine color bearers were killed or mortally wounded and two wounded, of 13 men to hold onto the flag during the first day of the battle, and all the color guard killed or wounded, a net loss of 80%. The 24th Michigan alongside the 1st Minnesota Infantry Regiment suffered the highest casualties of any Union forces that fought at Gettysburg."

Colonel Morrow was wounded while holding the regimental flag. "Just before reaching the fence, Col. Morrow was wounded in the head while bearing the colors. He was stunned by the wound and fell down. He was then helped from the field by Lt. Charles Hutton of Company G, with the last alive and non-wounded officer, then Captain Albert M. Edwards, assuming command of the regiment."

Thereafter, the 24th participated in the rest of the Army of the Potomac's campaigns and battles, participating in the Overland Campaign, being heavily engaged at both the Battle of the Wilderness and the Battle of Spotsylvania Court House, with Colonel Morrow being wounded in the Wilderness and Lieutenant Colonel William Wight would take command through the rest of the Overland Campaign except for the latter portion of the Battle of Spotsylvania Court House when he was sick and led by Albert M. Edwards, by then a major, until he was forced to resign to his wounds he sustained at Gettysburg, with command of the regiment once again falling on Albert M. Edwards, who was promoted to lieutenant colonel with Captain William Hutchinson being promoted to major and Edwards would be the commander of the regiment until December, 1864 when Colonel Morrow would return and then would become commander once again when Morrow was promoted to brevet brigadier general. The 24th after the Overland Campaign would participate in the Petersburg Campaign, participating in various battles during the siege such as the Battle of Globe Tavern, Battle of Boydton Plank Road, and the Battle of Peebles’ Farm in a supporting capacity but was not present at Appomattox because it had been reassigned to Camp Butler (Illinois) in Illinois two months earlier after participating in the Battle of Hatcher's Run.

The regiment was selected as an escort at the funeral of President Abraham Lincoln.

The regiment was mustered out on June 30, 1865.

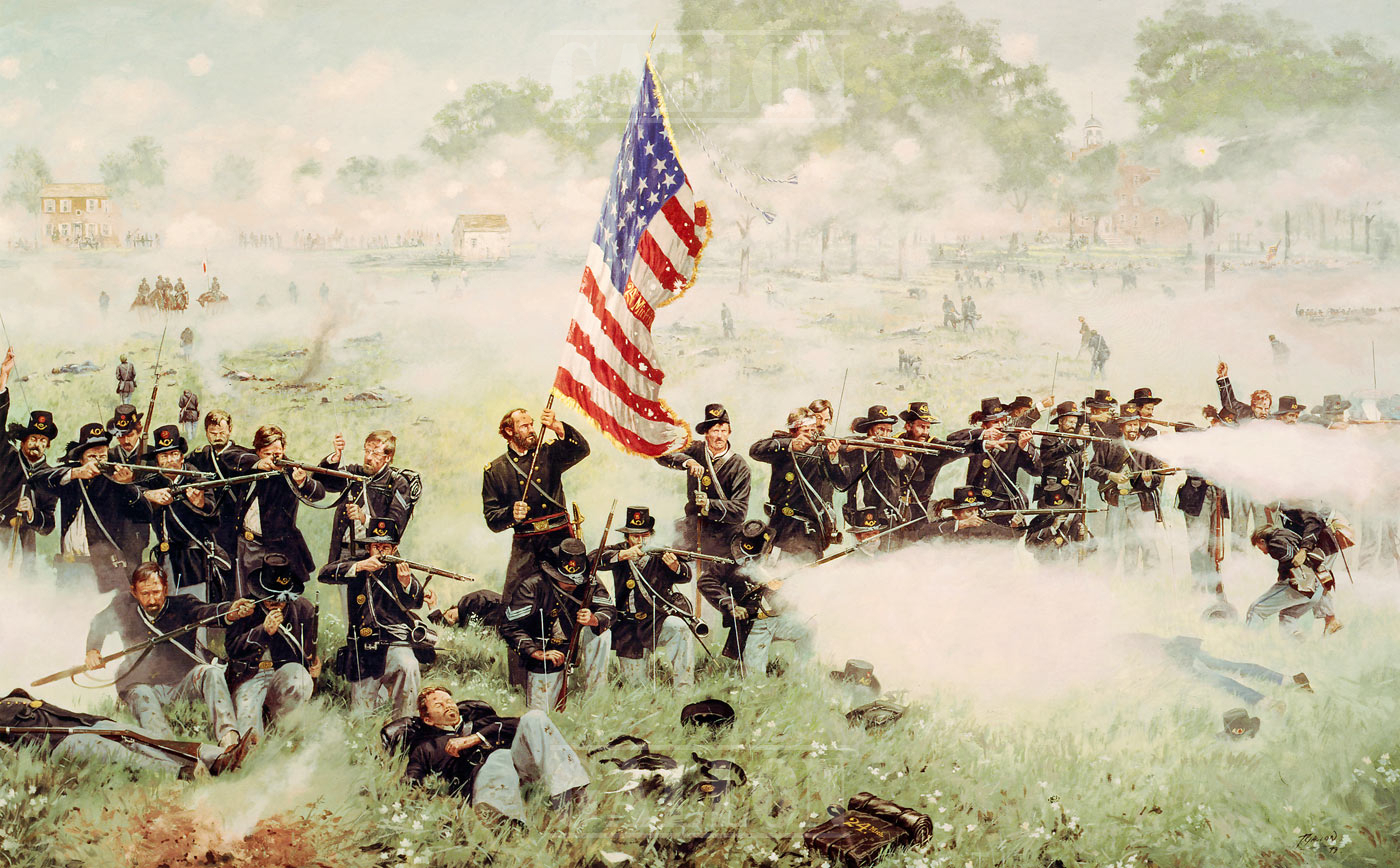
The 24th Michigan on their 5th line of defense on the 1st day of the Battle of Gettysburg, showing Colonel Morrow holding the regimental national colors before being wounded.

== Total strength and casualties ==
The regiment suffered 12 officers and 177 enlisted men who were killed in action or who died of their wounds and 3 officers and 136 enlisted men who died of disease, for a total of 328 fatalities, including John Litogot, the maternal uncle of auto tycoon Henry Ford, who was killed at the Battle of Fredericksburg. Barney Litogot, another uncle of Ford's, was wounded at Gettysburg and would serve with the regiment till the end of the war and serve on the honor guard for Lincoln's funeral.

== Commanders ==
- Colonel Henry Andrew Morrow, he would be regimental commander from its inception to his promotion to Brigadier General in January 1865, outside of his recovery from wounds he suffered at Gettysburg and The Wilderness and temporary brigade command. He was wounded three times during the war, he received a head wound while holding the regimental National colors at Gettysburg, during the opening fighting at the Wilderness, where he was wounded in the leg, and while as a general at Hatchers Run, being shot in the shoulder. When he was promoted to General he commanded the 3rd Brigade, 3rd Division, 5th Corps until his wounding at Hatcher's Run and then after his recovery became the last commander of the Iron Brigade then at muster out he was the commanding general of a Provincial Division in Kentucky. Morrow would lead the regiment at the Battle of Fredericksburg, the Port Royal Expedition, the demonstration at Fitzhugh Crossing, the Battle of Chancellorsville, the Battle of Gettysburg on the 1st day till he was wounded, the Battle of the Wilderness until he was once again wounded, and during the Siege of Petersburg from his return from convalescence from his Wilderness wound and leading a court martial board in Columbus, Ohio in November, 1864 until his promotion in January, 1865. Originally from Warrenton, Virginia, he served as a page at the United States Senate, where he was a favorite of Michigan senator Lewis Cass, who convinced him to move to Detroit and he also would fight in the Mexican-American War, seeing fighting at the Battle of Monterrey. Before the war he was a judge for Wayne County and after the war he would return to the army, initially serving in Louisiana assisting with Reconstruction efforts there before becoming Colonel of the 21st Infantry Regiment (United States). He is credited as to have created what would become the modern U.S. Army Post Exchange during his time with the 21st Infantry, being considered to be the "father of the PX”. He would continue serving in the regular army and continuing correspondence with his former soldiers in the 24th such as Colonel Edwards until his death in 1891. Breveted Major General.
- Lieutenant Colonel Albert Marshall Edwards, originally the commander of Company F, he was the highest-ranked officer alive and unharmed at the Battle of Gettysburg from the regiment and was the unofficial regimental commander from Gettysburg to his promotion to permanent commanding officer in January, 1865 after Colonel Morrow was promoted except at the times that Colonel Morrow would return from recovering from his wounds and when Lieutenant Colonel William Wight would return to command the regiment until Wight's resignation in June, 1864. Edwards would lead the regiment during the rest of the Battle of Gettysburg, the Mine Run Campaign, Spotsylvania Courthouse due to Lieutenant Colonel Wight being sick, the Battle of Cold Harbor, on the June 18th portion of the Second Battle of Petersburg (Edwards was in charge of 4th Division, V Corps skirmishers during the fighting on June 17, with Captain George W. Burchell leading the regiment in his place), a majority of the Siege of Petersburg, the Battle of Globe Tavern, the Battle of Boydton Plank Road, and the Battle of Hatcher’s Run. Edwards would promoted to major in February, 1864 with the promotion back dated to November, 1863 then Lieutenant Colonel in July, 1864 with the promotion backdated to June on the same day Lieutenant Colonel Wight resigned, became permanent commander in January, 1865 after Colonel Morrow's promotion and served in the capacity for the rest of the war and breveted colonel in March, 1865 and served as the head of the honor guard for Abraham Lincoln's funeral. At the Battle of the Wilderness Edwards, then a major, captured the flag of the 48th Virginia Infantry during the opening stages of the battle and at the same time of Colonel Morrow's wounding and would hand the colonel the flag before he was sent to a hospital. Lieutenant Colonel Edwards was a rarity in the regiment as he fought in every single battle the regiment was in and was never wounded with the regiment, with his only injury during the war happening when he was serving as a sergeant with the 1st Michigan Infantry Regiment where he was wounded and captured at the First Battle of Bull Run. Before the war he was a journalism student at the University of Michigan and worked for the Detroit Advertiser and Tribune. Lieutenant Colonel Edwards would pass away in Detroit in 1909. In 2018 the Michigan House of Representatives would send a resolution to committee to recommend the United States Congress to award posthumously 109 years after his death Lieutenant Colonel Edwards the Medal of Honor https://www.legislature.mi.gov/documents/2017-2018/Journal/House/htm/2018-HJ-02-08-014.htm. Breveted Colonel.
- Lieutenant Colonel Mark Flanigan, who was the original Lieutenant Colonel for the regiment and would be active commander when Colonel Morrow was serving as brigade commander. He was wounded at Gettysburg, losing a leg and being discharged for wounds. Before the war he was the Wayne County Sheriff and after his wounding and discharge he was appointed Provost General for the State of Michigan. Breveted Brigadier General.
- Lieutenant Colonel William Wight, who would command the regiment after Colonel Morrow's wounding at the Battle of the Wilderness, leading the regiment for the rest of the battle, he would be ill for the battle of Spotsylvania Courthouse but would return to lead the regiment at the Battle of North Anna until he would resign due to poor health in June, 1864. He would be the inspector sent by the State of Michigan during the Election of 1864. He was originally commander of Company K and was wounded at Gettysburg. Edwin Wight, the commander of Company A who would be promoted to major before Gettysburg was his younger brother.
- Major William Hutchinson, who would command the regiment at times in late 1864 and early 1865 especially after Colonel Morrow was promoted and Lieutenant Colonel Edwards was on leave for a brief period in January, 1865 and when Edwards was in charge of a court martial board in Springfield, Illinois after the regiment was assigned to Camp Butler. He was wounded twice during the war, his first wound during Gettysburg the second during the beginning of the Siege of Petersburg while having coffee with Lieutenant Colonel Edwards, just 15 minutes after his return from recruiting in Michigan. Major Hutchinson would serve a tour on the honor guard for President Lincoln's funeral and was the drill master to prepare the regiment for the honor of being the funeral escort. After the war Major Hutchinson would be a victim of the sinking of the Morning Star (1862 ship) in 1868, one of the worst disasters of the Great Lakes. Breveted Lieutenant Colonel.
- Captain George C. Gordon, he would command the regiment at times when Lieutenant Colonel Edwards and Major Hutchinson were otherwise busy between the end of the war and the muster out of the regiment. He was wounded and captured at Gettysburg and taken to Libby Prison and Andersonville Prison before escaping the prison later. Breveted Major.

The original field and staff officers and company line officers and their fates during the war where information is available (* marking if they discharged with the regiment):

Colonel-Henry A. Morrow, wounded 3 times, promoted to brigadier general. Breveted major general.

Lieutenant colonel – Mark Flanigan, wounded, lost a leg at Gettysburg, discharged for wounds. Breveted colonel and brigadier general.

Major – Henry W. Nall, resigned due to contracting a combination of tuberculosis and malaria he received from his time serving as a captain in the 7th Michigan Infantry Regiment, dying not long after his resignation.

Adjutant – James J. Burns – resigned due to disability.

Quartermaster – Digby V. Bell Jr. – honorably discharged on tender of resignation.

Surgeon – Dr. John H. Beech – promoted to brigade surgeon before resigning due to poor health in April, 1865.

Assistant surgeon – Dr. Charles C. Smith – honorably discharged on tender of resignation.

Assistant surgeon – Dr. Alexander Collar – honorably discharged due to ill health.

Chaplain – Reverend William C. Way-Only regimental Chaplain for a Michigan regiment to last from muster in to muster out.*

Sergeant major – Edwin Norton – wounded and captured at Gettysburg as a 1st Lieutenant, after release promoted to captain, was captured at the Battle of the Wilderness, after his release commanded Company H at the end of the war.*

Quartermaster sergeant – Alonzo Eaton-commissioned Lieutenant, was captured at the Battle of Globe Tavern, and was exchanged in February, 1865.*

Commissary sergeant – Gilbert Dickey – killed at Gettysburg as a 2nd Lieutenant, Dickey was a member of Michigan State University first graduating class and among the first names to be enshrined on MSU Alumni Memorial Chapel walls. Dickey was one of the very few original members of the regiment that wasn't from Wayne County as he came from Marshall, Michigan. His brother Harrison also joined the regiment at Springfield at the end of the war.

Hospital steward – Elmer D. Wallace – Commissioned lieutenant, after the war became Lieutenant Governor of North Dakota.*

Chief musician – James F. Raymond- Discharged honorably by order of General John Gibbon.

Drum major – Daniel B. Nichils- Discharged honorably by order of General John Gibbon.

Fife major – Charles M. Phillips- Discharged honorably by order of General John Gibbon.

Company A captain: Captain Edwin B. Wight – promoted to major and he was wounded and lost an eye at Gettysburg, resigned and discharged for his Gettysburg wounds. He was the younger brother of William Wight.

Company A 1st lieutenant – Richard S. Dillon – Promoted to captain and wounded four times at Gettysburg, he served as the acting assistant Inspector General of the Iron Brigade as well as being in charge of V Corps pioneers and pontoons in 1864-65 and was breveted Major for meritorious service.*

Company A 2nd lieutenant – H. Rees Whiting – wounded at both Fredericksburg and Gettysburg, he was made an aide to Morrow when he was promoted to brigadier general and was breveted Major for meritorious service.*

Company B captain – Captain Isaac W. Ingersoll – Resigned due to old age and disability.

Company B 1st lieutenant – William H. Redford – made regiment adjunct, he was wounded severely at Gettysburg and honorably discharged due to wounds.

Company B 2nd lieutenant – Frederick Augustus Buhl – a member of the Buhl family of whom the Buhl Building in Detroit gets its name, he was wounded at Gettysburg, resigned to accept a commission in the 1st Michigan Cavalry Regiment in which he would be killed in action.

Company C captain – Captain Calvin B. Crosby – resigned due to ill health.

Company C 1st lieutenant – Charles A. Hoyt – Wounded at both Fredericksburg and Gettysburg, discharged honorably due to wounds.

Company C 2nd lieutenant – Winfield S. Safford – killed at Gettysburg.

Company D captain – Captain William J. Speed – killed at Gettysburg, he was a Detroit city attorney before the war.

Company D 1st lieutenant – John M. Farland – promoted to captain after being wounded at Gettysburg while serving as an aide on the Iron Brigade, honorably discharged due to disability in July, 1864.

Company D 2nd lieutenant – Charles C. Yemans – served as an aide on the Iron Brigade staff until he resigned due to disability in September, 1863.

Company E captain – Captain James Cullen – resigned due to disability.

Company E 1st lieutenant – John J. Lennon – honorably discharged due to disability.

Company E 2nd lieutenant – Malachi J. O’Donnell – promoted to captain, he was killed at Gettysburg.

Company F captain – Captain Albert M. Edwards – promoted to major and then Lieutenant Colonel and breveted colonel, became regimental commander.*

Company F 1st lieutenant – Ara W. Sprague – wounded and captured at Gettysburg, he would die as a prisoner in Charleston, SC.

Company F 2nd lieutenant – Jacob M. Howard Jr – a son of Michigan United States senator Jacob M. Howard, he would be made a staff member of the I Corps then the V Corps and promoted to captain and then breveted major and lieutenant colonel at the end of the war.

Company G captain – Captain William A. Owen – wounded at Fredericksburg and he was discharged for wounds.

Company G 1st lieutenant – William Hutchinson – promoted to captain, wounded at Gettysburg and Petersburg and then promoted to major and breveted lieutenant colonel.*

Company G 2nd lieutenant – George W. Burchell – wounded at Fitzhugh Crossing, Spotsylvania Courthouse and the Siege of Petersburg, promoted to captain and resigned due to disability in January, 1865.

Company H captain – Captain Warren G. Vinton – Honorably discharged due to ill health.

Company H 1st lieutenant – John C. Merritt – he would die of typhoid fever in July, 1863.

Company H 2nd lieutenant – Newell Grace – Mortally wounded during the Battle of Gettysburg, dying at the Seminary Hospital on the third day of the battle.

Company I captain – Captain George C. Gordon – wounded and captured at Gettysburg, escaped prison and was breveted Major when the regiment was at Camp Butler.*

Company I 1st lieutenant – Henry P. Kinney – dismissed due to order after Fredericksburg.

Company I 2nd lieutenant – John M. Gordon – honorably discharged on tender of resignation.

Company K captain – William W. Wight – wounded at Gettysburg, he was promoted to major in October, 1863 then Lieutenant Colonel in early 1864, he would command the regiment after Colonel Morrow's wounding at the Wilderness and would lead the regiment at Spotsylvania Court House before resigning in June, 1864 due to impaired health from his Gettysburg wound. He would be the inspecter sent by the State of Michigan for the regiment during the Election of 1864. He was Edwin Wight's older brother.

Company K 1st lieutenant – Walter H. Wallace – Killed at Gettysburg.

Company K 2nd lieutenant – David Birrell – Killed at Fredericksburg.

The regiment staff and officers at muster out:

Lieutenant Colonel (Brevet Colonel) Albert M. Edwards

Major (Brevet Lieutenant Colonel) William Hutchinson

Adjutant Lewis H. Chamberlin

Surgeon George W. Towar

Assistant Surgeon Edward Lauderdale

Chaplain William C. Way

Quartermaster David Congdon

Sergeant Major Edward B. Chope

Quartermaster Sergeant Sullivan D. Green

Commissionary Sergeant Charles H. McConnell

Hospital Steward Owen Churchill

Musicians Arthur S. Congdon and Edwin Cotton

Company A captain (brevet major) Richard S. Dillon

1st Lieutenant Elmer D. Wallace

2nd Lieutenant George Dingwall

Company B Captain Edward B. Wilkie

1st Lieutenant Alonzo Eaton

2nd Lieutenant Charles H. Chope

Company C Captain John Witherspoon

1st Lieutenant Albert Wilford

2nd Lieutenant Augustus Pomeroy

Company D Captain George W. Haigh

1st Lieutenant George W. Chilson

2nd Lieutenant Charles A. King

Company E Captain (brevet Major) H. Rees Whiting

1st Lieutenant Samuel W. Church

2nd Lieutenant E. Ben Fischer

Company F Captain George A. Ross

1st Lieutenant Augustus F. Ziegler

2nd Lieutenant James D. Shearer

Company G Captain Benjamin W. Hendricks

1st Lieutenant Ferdinand E. Welton

2nd Lieutenant Augustus Hussey

Company H Captain Edwin E. Norton

1st Lieutenant Everard B. Welton

2nd Lieutenant Hugh F. Vanderlip

Company I Captain (brevet Major) George C. Gordon

1st Lieutenant Edgar A. Kimmel

2nd Lieutenant William M. McNoah

Company K Captain William R. Dodsley

1st Lieutenant Shepherd L. Howard

2nd Lieutenant Ira W. Fletcher

There was also a company of unassigned soldiers that was created while the regiment was at Camp Butler when they recruited back to full strength and they received so many soldiers they had a over abundance of soldiers and they were organized into a unassigned company under the command of 1st Lieutenant Augustus F. Ziegler of Company F.

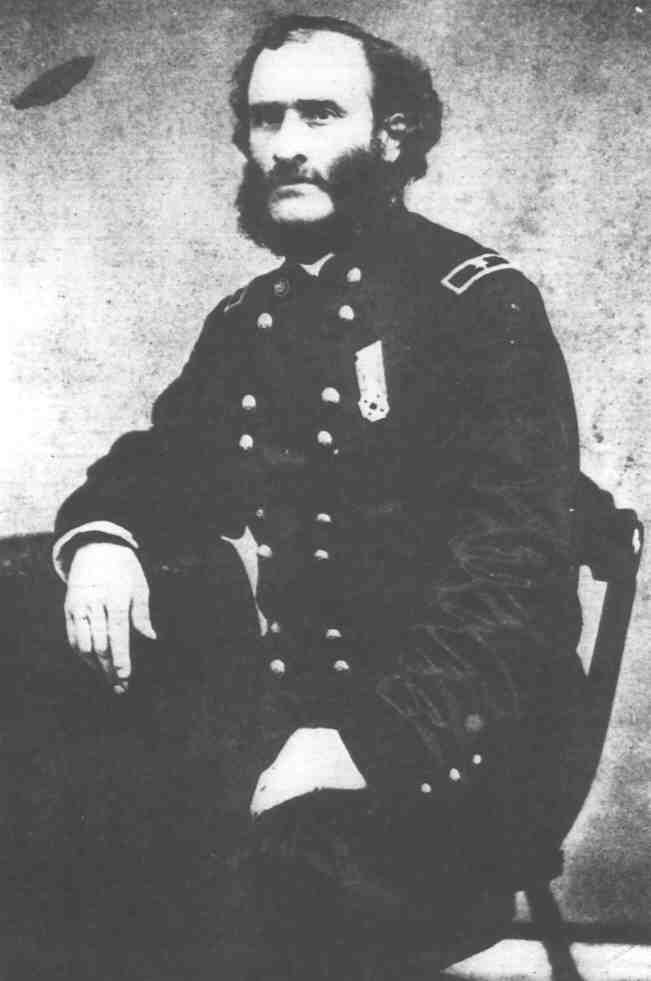
Colonel Henry A. Morrow, shown here as a brigadier general in 1865, he would be breveted major general in 1866.

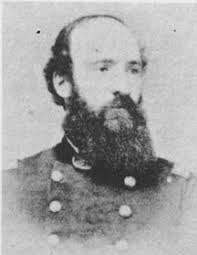
Lieutenant Colonel (Brevet Colonel) Albert M. Edwards.

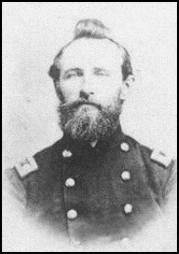
Lieutenant Colonel (Breveted Colonel, then Brigadier General) Mark Flanigan.

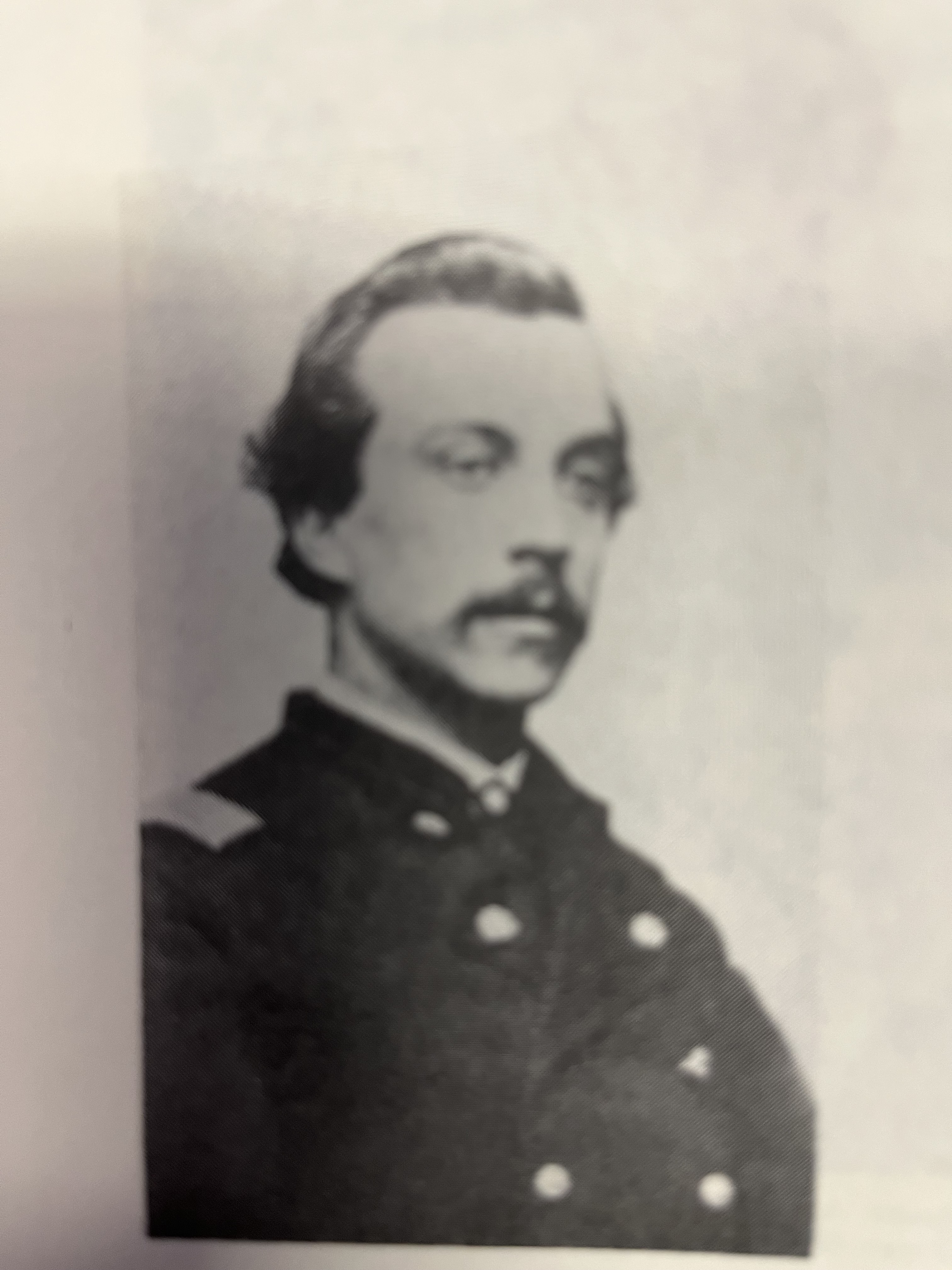
Major (Brevet Lieutenant Colonel) William Hutchinson.

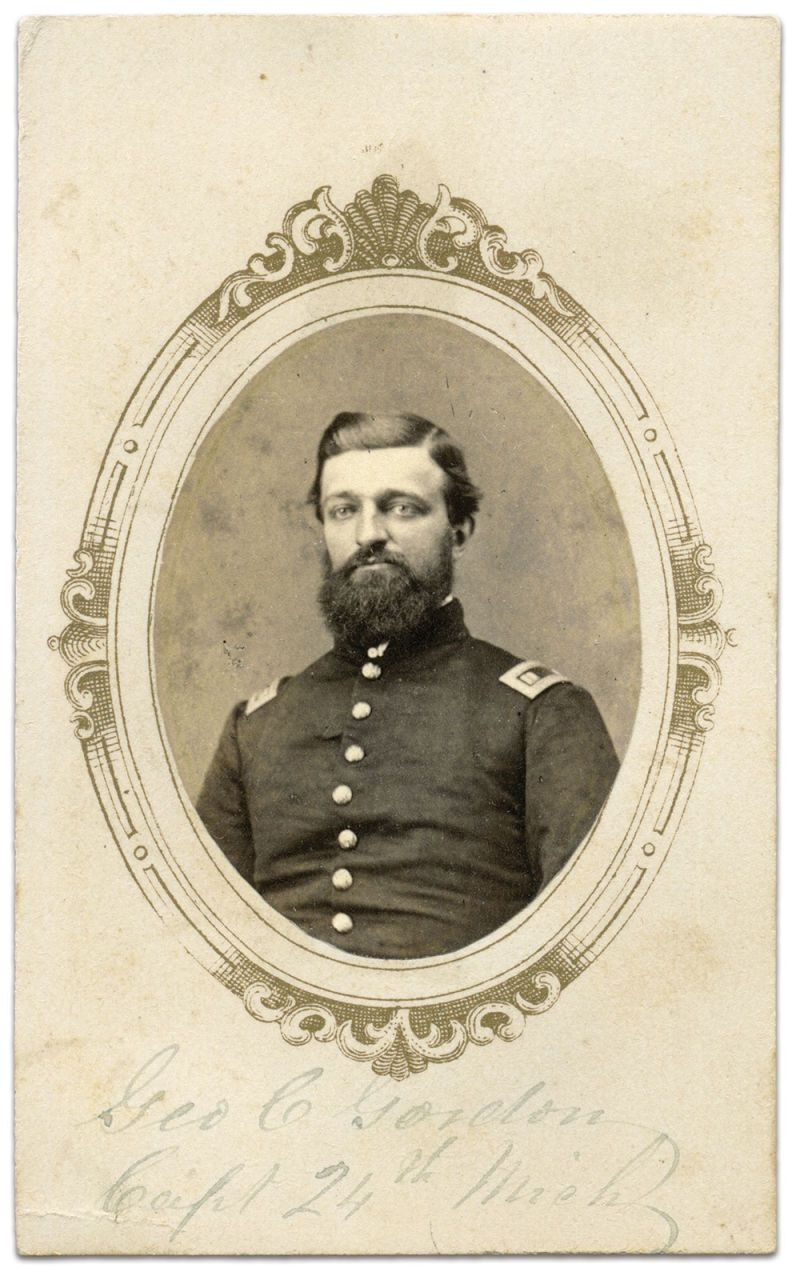
Captain (Brevet Major) George C. Gordon.

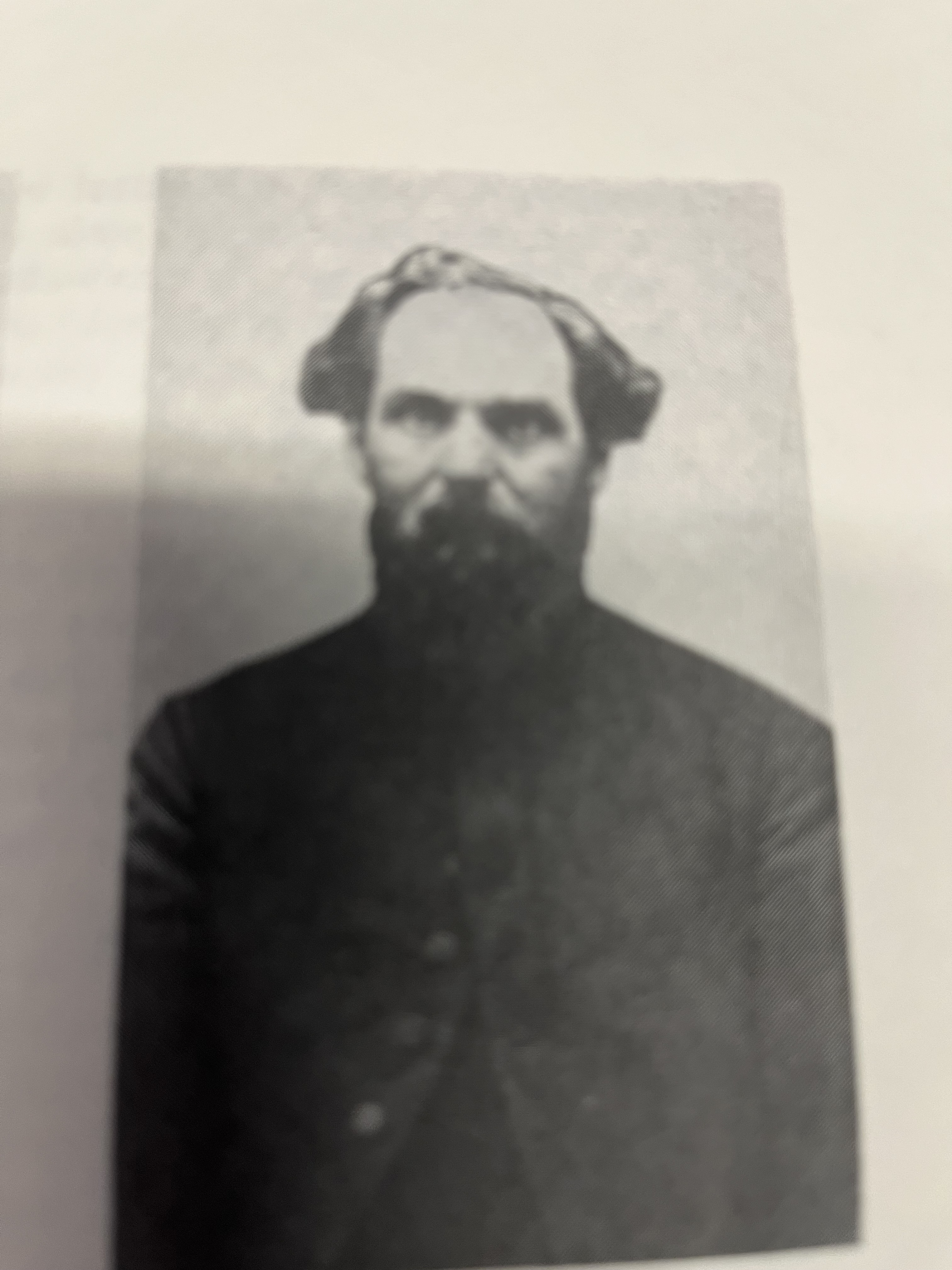
Chaplain William C. Way.

== See also ==
- List of Michigan Civil War Units
- Michigan in the American Civil War
