= 1864 Missouri lieutenant gubernatorial election =

- November 8, 1864
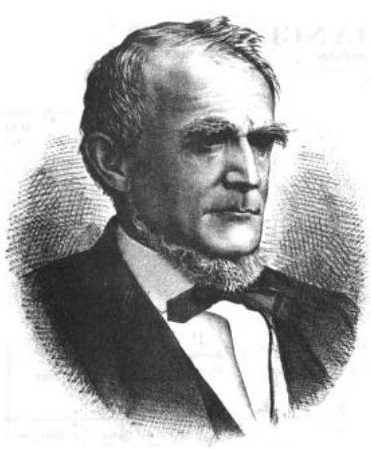

Nominee	George Smith	Luke W. Burris
Party	Republican	Democratic
Popular vote	Unknown	Unknown
Percentage	Unknown	Unknown
Lieutenant Governor before election
Willard Preble Hall (Provisional)
Republican
Elected Lieutenant Governor
George Smith
Republican

The 1864 Missouri lieutenant gubernatorial election was held on November 8, 1864, in order to elect the lieutenant governor of Missouri. Republican nominee and former member of the Missouri House of Representatives George Smith defeated Democratic nominee Luke W. Burris. The exact results of this election are unknown.

== General election ==
On election day, November 8, 1864, Republican nominee George Smith won the election against his opponent Democratic nominee Luke W. Burris, thereby retaining Republican control over the office of lieutenant governor. Smith was sworn in as the 13th lieutenant governor of Missouri on January 2, 1865.

=== Results ===
Missouri lieutenant gubernatorial election, 1864
Party	Candidate	Votes	%
Republican	George Smith	Unknown	Unknown
Democratic	Luke W. Burris	Unknown	Unknown
Total votes		Unknown	100.00
Republican hold			

== See also ==
- 1864 Missouri gubernatorial election
