= List of elections in 1864 =

The following elections occurred in the year 1864.

== Europe ==
- 1864 Belgian general election
- 1864 Dalmatian parliamentary election
- 1864 Danish Folketing election
- 1864 Portuguese legislative election
- 1864 Romanian general election
- 1864 Romanian constitutional referendum

== North America ==
=== Central America ===
- 1864 Honduran presidential election
- 1864 Salvadoran presidential election

=== United States ===
- 1864 New York state election
- 1864 United States elections

==== United States Presidential ====
- 1864 United States presidential election

==== United States Senate ====
- 1864 and 1865 United States Senate elections

==== United States House of Representatives ====
- 1864 United States House of Representatives elections
- 1864 United States House of Representatives elections in California

==== United States lieutenant gubernatorial ====
- 1864 Connecticut lieutenant gubernatorial election
- 1864 Illinois lieutenant gubernatorial election
- 1864 Missouri lieutenant gubernatorial election

==== United States gubernatorial ====
- 1864 Arkansas gubernatorial election
- 1864 Connecticut gubernatorial election
- 1864 Illinois gubernatorial election
- 1864 Indiana gubernatorial election
- 1864 Kansas gubernatorial election
- 1864 Louisiana gubernatorial election
- 1864 Maine gubernatorial election
- 1864 Maryland gubernatorial election
- 1864 Massachusetts gubernatorial election
- 1864 Michigan gubernatorial election
- 1864 Missouri gubernatorial election
- 1864 Nevada gubernatorial election
- 1864 New Hampshire gubernatorial election
- 1864 New York gubernatorial election
- 1864 Rhode Island gubernatorial election
- 1864 Vermont gubernatorial election
- 1864 West Virginia gubernatorial election

==== United States mayoral elections ====
- 1864 Boston mayoral election
- 1864 Manchester, New Hampshire, mayoral election

== See also ==
- Category:1864 elections
