= 1864 Nevada gubernatorial election =

- November 8, 1864
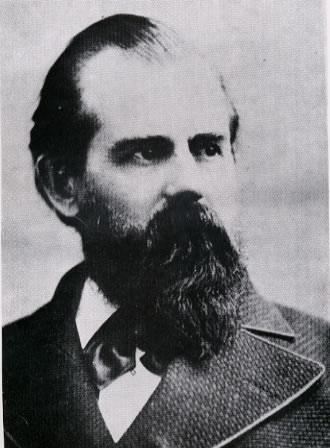

Nominee	Henry G. Blasdel	D. E. Buell
Party	Republican	Democratic
Popular vote	9,834	6,555
Percentage	60.00%	40.00%
- County results Blasdel: 50–60% 60–70% 70–80% Buell: 50–60%
Governor before election
James W. Nye (Territorial)
Republican
Elected Governor
Henry G. Blasdel
Republican

The 1864 Nevada gubernatorial election was held on November 7, 1864, in order to elect the first Governor of Nevada upon Nevada acquiring statehood on October 31, 1864. The Republican nominee Henry G. Blasdel won the election against Democratic nominee D.E. Buell.

== General election ==
On election day, November 7, 1864, Republican nominee Henry G. Blasdel won the election by a margin of 3,279 votes against his opponent Democratic nominee D.E. Buell, thereby retaining Republican control over the new office of Governor. Blasdel was sworn in as the first Governor of the new state of Nevada on January 3, 1865.

=== Results ===
Nevada gubernatorial election, 1864
Party	Candidate	Votes	%
Republican	Henry G. Blasdel	9,834	60.00%
Democratic	D. E. Buell	6,555	40.00%
Majority		3,279	20.00%
Total votes		16,389	100.00%
Republican hold			

=== Results by county ===
	Henry G. Blasdel Republican		D. E. Buell Democratic		Margin		Total votes cast
County	#	%	#	%	#	%	Total votes cast
Churchill	127	44.41%	159	55.59%	-32	-11.19%	286
Douglas	490	74.13%	171	25.87%	319	48.26%	661
Esmeralda	611	59.44%	417	40.56%	194	18.87%	1,028
Humboldt	488	59.44%	333	40.56%	155	18.88%	821
Lander	1,313	51.96%	1,214	48.04%	99	3.92%	2,527
Lyon	960	75.35%	314	24.65%	646	50.71%	1,274
Nye	115	60.85%	74	39.15%	41	21.69%	189
Ormsby	699	54.95%	573	45.05%	126	9.91%	1,272
Storey	3,430	58.57%	2,426	41.43%	1,004	17.14%	5,856
Washoe & Roop	1,070	56.40%	827	43.60%	243	12.81%	1,897 (Note: Returns for Washoe and Roop were received together)
Soldiers	531	91.87%	47	8.13%	484	83.74%	578
Totals	9,834	60.00%	6,555	40.00%	3,279	20.01%	16,389
