= George Smith (Missouri politician) =

American politician (1809–1881)

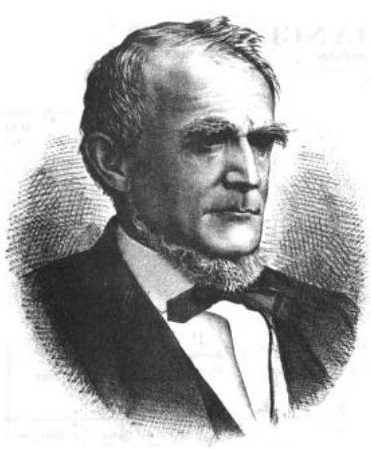
- From 1876's An Illustrated Historical Atlas of Clinton County, Missouri

United States Marshal for the Western District of Missouri
- In office 1869–1877
- Preceded by: Thomas Bates Wallace
- Succeeded by: Charles C. Allen

Lieutenant Governor of Missouri
- In office 1865–1869
- Governor: Thomas Clement Fletcher
- Preceded by: Willard Preble Hall
- Succeeded by: Edwin Obed Stanard

Member of the Missouri House of Representatives from Caldwell County
- In office 1862–1863
- In office 1852–1853

Member of the Ohio House of Representatives from Columbiana County
- In office 1837–1839

Personal details
- Born: February 2, 1809 Columbiana County, Ohio, U.S.
- Died: July 14, 1881 (aged 72) Cameron, Missouri, U.S.
- Resting place: Packard Cemetery, Cameron, Missouri
- Party: Democratic (before 1861); Unconditional Union (1861-1862); Republican (from 1862)
- Spouse(s): Sarah A. Chapman (m. 1833-1836, her death); Mary A. Kerrins (m. 1839-1881, his death)
- Children: 7
- Education: Miami University (attended)
- Occupation: Businessman; Farmer

George Smith (February 2, 1809 - July 14, 1881) was an American politician who was active in Ohio and Missouri. He was most notable for his service as Lieutenant governor of Missouri from 1865 to 1869, and United States Marshal for the Western District of Missouri from 1869 to 1877.

== Early life ==
George Smith was born in Columbiana County, Ohio on February 2, 1809, the son of John and Mary (Fisher) Smith. Both of Smith's grandfathers were natives of Pennsylvania and veterans of the American Revolution, and his father was a veteran of the War of 1812.

Smith was educated in Columbiana County and attended Miami University in Oxford, Ohio, but left before graduating so he could begin a business and farming career. His early ventures included transporting flour by boat to New Orleans in the winter, and driving cattle from Ohio to eastern Pennsylvania and Maryland in the summer. Smith was also active in the state militia, and was appointed commander of the 1st Company of the 1st Regiment with the rank of captain.

== Start of career ==
In 1835, Smith moved to East Liverpool, Ohio, where he established a successful business as a merchant and freight forwarder. A Democrat, from 1837 to 1839 he represented Columbiana County in the Ohio House of Representatives. During his legislative service, Smith was appointed chairman of the House Committee on Banks and Corporations.

== Move to Missouri ==
In 1832, Smith stopped in St. Louis, where he purchased a horse and began a trip to explore the western part of Missouri. In 1844, Smith moved to Caldwell County, Missouri, where he resided for the next 24 years. He transported a flock of sheep from his Ohio home to his new home in Missouri, and became one of the first major wool growers in the state.

In 1852, Smith was elected to represent Caldwell County in the Missouri House of Representatives. He served in the session of 1853, and received credit for passage of the bill which created the Hannibal and St. Joseph Railroad and the Pacific Railroad. During the Bleeding Kansas crisis of the mid to late 1850s, Smith opposed the efforts of the pro-slavery side and declared himself in favor of maintaining the Union.

== Civil War ==
At the start of the American Civil War, Smith declared himself an Unconditional Unionist and an abolitionist. Among his pro-Union activities was the organization of a militia unit in Caldwell County, one of the first organized outside St. Louis. In 1862, he was again elected to the Missouri House of Representatives, where the Republican Caucus appointed him to the committee which drafted the call for a convention of pro-Union Missourians. The convention enacted several measures, including the abolition of slavery and the restriction of voting rights to Unionists who opposed the Confederacy.

In 1864, Smith was president of the state Republican convention, which was held in Jefferson City. The convention delegates nominated Smith for lieutenant governor. He was elected by a substantial majority, and served from January 2, 1865 to January 12, 1869. As lieutenant governor, Smith presided over the Missouri Senate, and was praised by members of the Republican and Democratic parties for his tact and fairness. In addition, he served as president of the state board of equalization, which heard appeals and made adjustments of real estate and personal property tax assessments.

== Later life ==
In 1868, Smith moved to Cameron, Missouri. In March 1869, he was appointed United States Marshal for the Western District of Missouri. He served until March 1877, when he declined reappointment and retired. In retirement, Smith was active in Cameron's Presbyterian church, of which he was ruling elder for several years.

Smith died in Cameron on July 14, 1881. He was buried at Packard Cemetery in Cameron.

== Family ==
In 1833, Smith married Sarah A. Chapman of Brooke County, West Virginia. They were the parents of a son and a daughter. Sarah Chapman Smith died in 1836, and in 1839 Smith married Mary A. Kerrins. With his second wife, Smith was the father of three sons and two daughters.

Party political offices
Vacant Title last held by Alonzo Thompson	Republican nominee for State Auditor of Missouri; 1876	Succeeded by L. A. Thompson
